= 2026 Liga Nusantara final =

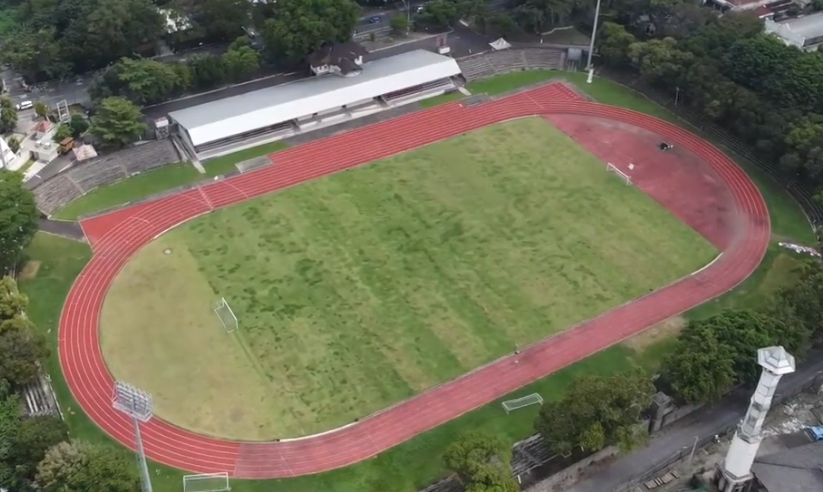
- The final match will be held at Sriwedari Stadium
- Event: 2025–26 Liga Nusantara
Dejan	RANS Nusantara
2	2
- After extra time RANS Nusantara won 4–3 on penalties.
- Date: 8 February 2026
- Venue: Sriwedari Stadium, Surakarta
- Referee: Wawan Rafiko

The 2026 Liga Nusantara final was the final match of the 2025–26 Liga Nusantara, the second season of the Liga Nusantara under its current name and the 10th season under its current league structure. This match saw RANS Nusantara facing off against Dejan and was held at the Sriwedari Stadium in Surakarta, Central Java on 8 February 2026.

RANS Nusantara won their first ever Liga Nusantara title and their first Indonesian 3rd-tier league title after defeating Dejan in the penalty shoot-out.

== Background ==
=== Dejan ===
Since its establishment, Dejan has never reached the final of a third-tier league, making this season their best ever.

=== RANS Nusantara ===
Since the establishment of Liga 3 as the third-tier league, RANS Nusantara has never reached the final. Their last third-tier final was the 2014 First Division, back when the club was still named Cilegon United. In the match, they clinched a 3–0 victory on penalty shoot-out after a 1–1 tie in normal time against Persibat.

=== Previous finals ===
Team	Previous final appearances (bold indicates winners)
Dejan	None
RANS Nusantara	None

== Route to the final ==
Dejan
Round
RANS Nusantara
**Group A** **winner**

Pos	Team	Pld	Pts
**1**	Dejan (P)	**12**	**32**
2	Batavia	12	**19**
3	Nusantara Lampung	12	**13**
4	Persipa	12	**10**
5	PSDS (R)	12	**8**

Source: Liga Nusantara 2025–26
(P) Promoted; (R) Relegated
Regular round
**Group C** **runner-up**

Pos	Team	Pld	Pts
1	Persika Karanganyar	12	**23**
**2**	RANS Nusantara (C, P)	**12**	**20**
3	Persibo	12	**18**
4	Persinab Sang Maestro	12	**15**
5	Persikutim United (X)	12	**6**

Source: Liga Nusantara 2025–26
(C) Champions; (P) Promoted; (X) Relegation play-off winners
Opponents
Result
Knockout round
Opponents
Result
Pekanbaru
4–2 (a.e.t.)
Quarter-finals
Persekabpas
2–0
PSGC
2–0
Semi-finals
Persiba Bantul
2–1

== Format ==
The final will be played as a single match. If tied after regulation time, extra time and, if necessary, a penalty shoot-out will be used to decide the winning team.

== Match ==
8 February 2026
15:00

Dejan	2–2 (a.e.t.)	RANS Nusantara
Bissa 45+2'; Rezavi 92'	Report	Escobar 39'; Ade Saihitua 110' (pen.)
Penalties
Sopian (penalty missed); Suhendri (penalty scored); Fathoni (penalty scored); Rezavi (penalty scored); Sumadi (penalty missed)	3–4	(penalty missed) Ade Saihitua; (penalty scored) Sheva; (penalty scored) Rabbani; (penalty scored) Alamsyah; (penalty scored) Nadief

Sriwedari Stadium, Surakarta
Referee: Wawan Rafiko

**Dejan**	**RANS Nusantara**

GK	23	(Indonesia) Sujarmin
RB	5	(Indonesia) Ivan Julyandhy
CB	11	(Indonesia) Rezavi (c)
CB	24	(Indonesia) Noval Ferdiansyah		(substituted off) 105'
LB	40	(Indonesia) Rakha Shabir	(substituted off) 105'
LM	21	(Indonesia) Syahwal Ginting	(substituted off) 81'
CM	9	(Indonesia) Riski Ramadhan
CM	19	(Indonesia) Riza Zidane		(substituted off) 56'
RM	20	(Indonesia) Wawan Sumadi
CF	12	(Indonesia) Abdul Latif		(substituted off) 56'
CF	99	(Indonesia) Donald Bissa		(substituted off) 105'
Substitutions:
GK	1	(Indonesia) Farrel Damara
CB	17	(Indonesia) Fauzan Syahwal		(substituted on) 105'
CM	6	(Indonesia) Die Keita
CM	31	(Indonesia) Iftiqar Rizal
AM	8	(Indonesia) Andi Sopian		(substituted on) 56'
RB	3	(Indonesia) Abdan Hanif		(substituted on) 105'
CM	7	(Indonesia) Aray Suhendri		(substituted on) 105'
CM	55	(Indonesia) Rayhan Darmawan		(substituted on) 81'
CM	22	(Indonesia) Aziz Fatahillah
CF	10	(Indonesia) Afif Fathoni		(substituted on) 56'
Manager:
(Indonesia) Nurcholis

GK	29	(Indonesia) Ditea Dwi Cahya
RB	21	(Indonesia) Abanda Rahman (c)
CB	19	(Indonesia) Ade Saihitua
CB	3	(Indonesia) Bayu Aji
LB	87	(Indonesia) Almaghfiru Inzaghi	(substituted off) 116'
DM	6	(Indonesia) Tony Sucipto	(substituted off) 31'
CM	16	(Indonesia) Refan Nadief
CM	12	(Indonesia) Aqsa Rabbani
RM	7	(Indonesia) Ruy Arianto	(substituted off) 50'
LM	11	(Indonesia) Rivaldi Bawuo	(substituted off) 79'
CF	9	(Indonesia) Sílvio Escobar	(substituted off) 79'
Substitutions:
GK	14	(Indonesia) Davin Prasetiyo
RB	75	(Indonesia) Rio Fernando
RW	15	(Indonesia) Achmad Dwi Firmansyah	(substituted on) 50'
CF	22	(Indonesia) Dzaki Alamsyah	(substituted on) 79'
DM	13	(Indonesia) Sultan Akbar	(substituted on) 31'
CF	77	(Indonesia) Agi Firmansyah	(substituted on) 116'
AM	79	(Indonesia) Raya Sheva	(substituted on) 79'
LB	17	(Indonesia) Dandy Aryanto
AM	10	(Indonesia) Slamet Nurcahyono
AM	8	(Indonesia) Alwi Furqon
Manager:
(Indonesia) Kas Hartadi

Assistant referees:
Ilham Langago
Wikara Dwi Saputra
Fourth official:
Abdul Hamid

**Match rules**

- 90 minutes
- 30 minutes of extra time if tied after normal time
- Penalty shoot-out if still tied after extra time
- Ten named substitutes, of which up to five may be used, with a sixth allowed in extra time.

== See also ==
- 2025–26 Liga Nusantara
