= 2025–26 Liga Nusantara =

Second season of the Liga Nusantara in Indonesia

Liga Nusantara
- Season: 2025–26
- Dates: 29 November 2025 – 8 February 2026
- Champions: RANS Nusantara; 1st Liga Nusantara title 1st third-tier title
- Promoted: Dejan; PSGC; RANS Nusantara
- Relegated: Persewar (withdrew); Persikabo 1973 (withdrew); Perserang; Persebata; PSDS; Waanal Brothers
- Matches: 160
- Goals: 383 (2.39 per match)
- Top goalscorer: Donald Bissa (11 goals)
- Biggest home win: Dejan 5–0 PSDS (11 December 2025)
- Biggest away win: PSDS 0–5 Batavia (26 December 2025); Nusantara Lampung 0–5 Dejan (15 January 2026)
- Highest scoring: PSDS 1–5 Nusantara Lampung (3 December 2025); Persiba 4–2 Waanal Brothers (9 January 2026)
- Longest winning run: 7 games PSGC
- Longest unbeaten run: 13 games Dejan
- Longest winless run: 10 games Persikutim United
- Longest losing run: 5 games Waanal Brothers
- Total attendance: 280

The 2025–26 Liga Nusantara was the second season of the Liga Nusantara under its current name and the 10th season under its current league structure. The season is scheduled to begin on 29 November 2025 and conclude on 8 February 2026.

== Overview ==
=== Promotion and relegation (pre-season) ===
24 teams will compete in the league – the seven teams from the previous season, nine teams relegated from the Liga 2 and eight teams promoted from Liga 4.

==== Teams promoted to Championship ====
On 17 February 2025, Kendal Tornado (formerly Tornado Pekanbaru) became the first team to secure promotion to Championship after defeating PSGC in matchweek 5 of Group X in the championship round. Tornado ended seven seasons stay in third tier.

Persikad Depok (formerly Sumut United) and Persiba Balikpapan also earned promotion, both returning to Championship after a one-season in third tier. Persikad sealed promotion on 23 February 2025 with a 5–1 away win over NZR Sumbersari in matchweek 6 of Group Y. Persiba secured the final promotion spot on 27 February 2025 after defeating PSGC in a penalty shootout in the promotion play-off.

==== Teams relegated from Liga 2 ====
The first three teams to be relegated were Nusantara Lampung (formerly Nusantara United), Persikabo 1973, and Persikota, following the results of their respective matches on 10 February 2025. Nusantara Lampung and Persikota drew their games, but the results were insufficient to avoid relegation. On the same day, Sriwijaya secured a win over PSMS in matchweek 5 of Group H in the relegation round.

Nusantara Lampung were relegated to the third tier after three seasons in the second tier. Persikota also returned to the third tier just one season after gaining promotion. Persikabo 1973 suffered a second consecutive relegation, having failed to retain their place in the second tier after losing to Adhyaksa in matchweek 5 of Group I and play in third tier for the first time in their history for this season.

RANS Nusantara became the fourth team to be relegated on 13 February 2025 after a loss to Persipal in matchweek 6 of Group K, marking their second straight relegation after just one season in the second tier.

Persewar, after six seasons in the second tier, along with Persipa and Gresik United, each after three seasons, were also relegated. Persewar were relegated on 16 February 2025 after a defeat in matchweek 8 of Group J. Persipa followed on 21 February 2025 after Persipura defeated RANS Nusantara in matchweek 9 of Group K. Gresik United were relegated on 25 February 2025 after Persibo won against Persewar in matchweek 10 of Group J.

Meanwhile, Dejan and Persibo also returned to the third tier just one season after gaining promotion. Dejan were relegated on 15 February 2025 following a defeat to Adhyaksa in matchweek 6 of Group I, while Persibo were relegated on 28 February 2025 after losing to Persipura in a single-match relegation play-off.

==== Teams relegated to Liga 4 ====
Kalteng Putra and Sulut United withdrew, while Persipani was disqualified from Liga Nusantara after failing to participate in the third tier. All three clubs were relegated to Liga 4 for the first time in their history.

757 Kepri Jaya, Persikab, Persipasi, PSCS, and PSM Madiun were relegated to Liga 4 for the first time in their history, respectively.

==== Teams promoted from Liga 4 ====
Tri Brata Rafflesia became the first team to be promoted on 13 May 2025 after defeating Celebest in matchday 2 Group C third round of national phase.

Batavia and Persitara became next two teams to be promoted following the results of their respective matches on 14 May 2025 in final matchday of Group A third round of national phase. Batavia draw with Persibat and Persitara got a narrow win against PS Mojokerto Putra.

The promotion of Persika Karanganyar and Persebata was determined through the head-to-head record in the mini standings for Group B of the third round of the national phase because the points from both teams were the same as Persic from the three matches played, where the results of Persika and Persebata were promoted on 14 May 2025.

Sang Maestro also secured promotion on 15 May 2025 after beating Tri Brata Rafflesia in final matchday Group C third round of national phase.

Perseden and Pekanbaru became the last two teams to be promoted following the results of their respective matches on 15 May 2025 in final matchday of Group D the third round of the national phase. Perseden defeating Persema and Pekanbaru draw with Persikoba without scoring a goal.

All of these teams will compete in the debut season of the Liga Nusantara in their respective history since the league's status was upgraded from amateur to semi-professional.

=== Name changes and relocated teams ===
- RANS Nusantara moved their homebase to Brantas Stadium in Batu starting from this season.
- NZR Sumbersari place in the league was acquired by Liga 4 side Persikutim East Kutai. As a result, Persikutim took over NZR Sumbersari's place in Liga Nusantara starting from this season and they will compete under name Persikutim United.
- Nusantara United changed their full name to Nusantara Lampung and moved to Pahoman Stadium in Bandar Lampung starting from this season.
- Sang Maestro was acquired by Liga 4 side Persinab Nabire. As a result, Persinab took over Sang Maestro's place in Liga Nusantara starting from this season and they will compete under name Persinab Sang Maestro.

== Teams ==
=== Team changes ===
The following teams changed division after the 2024–25 season.

To Liga Nusantara
▼ Relegated from Liga 2
- Dejan
- Gresik United
- Nusantara Lampung
- Persewar
- Persibo
- Persikabo 1973
- Persikota
- Persipa
- RANS Nusantara
▲ Promoted from Liga 4
- Tri Brata Rafflesia
- Persika Karanganyar
- Pekanbaru
- Persebata
- Batavia
- Perseden
- Persinab Sang Maestro
- Persitara

From Liga Nusantara
▲ Promoted to Championship
- Persikad
  (previously Sumut United)
- Kendal Tornado
- Persiba Balikpapan
▼ Relegated to Liga 4
- Kalteng Putra (withdrew)
- Sulut United (withdrew)
- Persipani (disqualified)
- 757 Kepri Jaya
- Persikab
- Persipasi
- PSCS
- PSM Madiun

Withdrawn teams
- ~~Persewar~~
- ~~Persikabo 1973~~

=== Teams by province ===
Rank	Province	Number	Teams
1	East Java	4	Gresik United, Persekabpas, Persibo, and RANS Nusantara
2	West Java	3	Dejan, Persikabo 1973, and PSGC
3	Banten	2	Perserang and Persikota
3	Central Java	2	Persika Karanganyar and Persipa
3	Central Papua	2	Persinab Sang Maestro and Waanal Brothers
3	Jakarta	2	Batavia and Persitara
7	Bali	1	Perseden
7	Bengkulu	1	Tri Brata Rafflesia
7	East Kalimantan	1	Persikutim United
7	East Nusa Tenggara	1	Persebata
7	Lampung	1	Nusantara Lampung
7	North Sumatra	1	PSDS
7	(Papua (province)) Papua	1	Persewar
7	Riau	1	Pekanbaru
7	(Special Region of Yogyakarta) Yogyakarta	1	Persiba Bantul

=== Stadiums and locations ===
Locations of teams in the 2025–26 Liga Nusantara.
Green: Group A; Yellow: Group B; Red: Group C; Blue: Group D
Locations of teams in the 2025–26 Liga Nusantara from Java region.
Green: Group A; Yellow: Group B; Red: Group C; Blue: Group D
Locations of teams in the 2025–26 Liga Nusantara from Jakarta.
Green: Group A; Yellow: Group B; Red: Group C; Blue: Group D

Team	Location	Stadium	Capacity	2024–25 season
Batavia^{↑}	South Jakarta	Soemantri Brodjonegoro	5,000	3rd in NP R4 Group B
Dejan^{↓}	Depok	Merpati	10,000	3rd in RL Group I
Gresik United^{↓}	Gresik	Gelora Joko Samudro	25,000	4th in RL Group J
Nusantara Lampung^{↓}	Bandar Lampung	Pahoman	15,000	3rd in RL Group H
Pekanbaru^{↑}	Pekanbaru	Garuda Sakti	0	2nd in NP R4 Group B
Persebata^{↑}	Lembata	Oepoi, at Kupang (Note: Due to the lack of readiness of the Gelora 99 Stadium in Lembata and its supporting facilities, Persebata will play their home matches at the Oepoi Stadium in Kupang.)	10,000	2nd in NP R4 Group A
Perseden^{↑}	Denpasar	I Gusti Ngurah Rai	12,000	3rd in NP R4 Group A
Perseden^{↑}	Denpasar	Kompyang Sujana	7,000	3rd in NP R4 Group A
Persekabpas	Pasuruan	R. Soedarsono	10,000	3rd in CH Group X
Perserang	Serang	Maulana Yusuf	15,000	2nd in RL Group K
Persewar^{↓}	Waropen	Mandala, at Jayapura (Note: Due to the lack of available stadiums in Waropen, Persewar will play their home matches at the Mandala Stadium in Jayapura.)	30,000	5th in RL Group J
Persiba Bantul	Bantul	Sultan Agung	30,000	1st in RL Group J
Persibo^{↓}	Bojonegoro	Letjen Haji Sudirman	15,000	Relegation play-off loser
Persika Karanganyar^{↑}	Karanganyar	Angkatan 45	5,000	Liga 4 NP Runners-up
Persikabo 1973^{↓}	Bogor	Pakansari	30,000	4th in RL Group I
Persikota^{↓}	Tangerang	Benteng Reborn	7,500	4th in RL Group H
Persikutim United	East Kutai	Kudungga	10,000	3rd in CH Group Y
Persinab Sang Maestro^{↑}	Nabire	Siriwini	0	4th in NP R4 Group B
Persipa^{↓}	Pati	Joyokusumo	10,000	4th in RL Group K
Persitara^{↑}	North Jakarta	Tugu	4,000	4th in NP R4 Group A
PSDS	Deli Serdang	Baharuddin Siregar	15,000	2nd in RL Group J
PSGC	Ciamis	Galuh	20,000	4th in Liga Nusantara
RANS Nusantara^{↓}	Batu	Brantas	10,000	5th in RL Group K
Tri Brata Rafflesia^{↑}	Bengkulu	Semarak	15,000	Liga 4 NP Champions
Waanal Brothers	Mimika	Wania Imipi	5,500	1st in RL Group K

^{↓}	Relegated from the Championship
^{↑}	Promoted from the Liga 4

League notes:
- CH: Championship round
- RL: Relegation round
- NP R4: National phase fourth round

Location notes:

=== Personnel and kits ===
Note: Flags indicate national team as has been defined under FIFA eligibility rules. Players and coaches may hold more than one non-FIFA nationality.

Team	Head coach	Captain	Kit manufacturer	Main kit sponsor	Other kit sponsor(s)
Batavia	(Indonesia national football team) Charis Yulianto	(Indonesia national football team) Faozan Tamami	(Indonesia) Nine	PSF Group	List: Front: None; Back: Jaga Sport, Primaya Hospital; Sleeves: None; Shorts: None
Dejan	(Indonesia national football team) Nurcholis	(Indonesia national football team) Aray Suhendri	(Indonesia) Asix	Careguard	List: Front: CareFast; Back: Se'Indonesia; Sleeves: None; Shorts: None
Gresik United	(Indonesia national football team) Andik Ardiansyah	(Indonesia national football team) Guntur Ariyadi	(Indonesia) GUS Apparel^{2}	AQUVIVA	List: Front: Phonska Plus; Back: None; Sleeves: Leading A Green New Life; Shorts: None
Nusantara Lampung	(Indonesia national football team) Ismed Sofyan	(Indonesia national football team) Didik Setyawan	(Indonesia) Gendoel Sport	Semen Baturaja	List: Front: Trima+, Asia Makmur; Back: Surya Group, Air Mineral Tripanca, RJT Advertising, Nacita Karya, Nusantara-Mix, PT Royal Jaya Estate Pesawaran; Sleeves: HIPMI Bandar Lampung; Shorts: None
Pekanbaru	(Indonesia national football team) Miskardi	(Indonesia national football team) Hendra Saputra	(Indonesia) Curva Sport	Carabao Hydration	List: Front: None; Back: Pemerintah Kota Pekanbaru; Sleeves: None; Shorts: None
Persebata	(Indonesia national football team) Edward Togo	(Indonesia national football team) Denis Domaking	(Indonesia) BB Sport	NTT	List: Front: Bank NTT, NBBN FC; Back: None; Sleeves: None; Shorts: None
Perseden	(Indonesia national football team) I Wayan Arsana	(Indonesia national football team) I Made Antha Wijaya	(Indonesia) Trent	Fitness Plus Indonesia	List: Front: Bank BPD Bali; Back: Bali Daksina Wisata, éL Hotel, BTV; Sleeves: The Medical Bali; Shorts: None
Persekabpas	(Indonesia national football team) Masdra Nurriza	(Indonesia national football team) Dani Pratama	(Indonesia) RMB Apparel	Sarung Mangga	List: Front: Gaung Catering Service, 78 Billiards & Cafe; Back: Jiwater; Sleeves: Jatijaya Garage, Jagorawi Florist; Shorts: None
Perserang	(Indonesia national football team) Bonggo Pribadi	(Indonesia national football team) Imam Mahmudi	(Indonesia) Garuda Muda	None	List: Front: None; Back: None; Sleeves: SaLaWe; Shorts: None
Persewar	Withdrew				
Persiba Bantul	(Indonesia national football team) Andri Ramawi	(Indonesia national football team) Fachrizal Ahnaf	(Indonesia) Almer Apparel	Muncul Group	List: Front: Sedayu General Hospital, Bintang Galaxy Football Academy; Back: HSP Sportwear, Cheers Air Mineral; Sleeves: Sayur Online Bantul, Feliday Vet & Pet Care; Shorts: None
Persibo	(Indonesia national football team) Alfiat	(Indonesia national football team) Samsul Arif	(Indonesia) Calma	Sungai Indah Group (H, A, & 4th) / None (3rd)	List: Front: Farmel, Pakar IPAL Indonesia; Back: Cendrawasih Karsa (H, A, & 4th) / Cendrawasih Karsa, Sungai Indah Group (3rd); Sleeves: None; Shorts: None
Persika Karanganyar	(Indonesia national football team) Ahmad Bustomi	(Indonesia national football team) Abi Defa Marendra	(Indonesia) Amrta	PT Jatayu Perkasa Indonesia	List: Front: None; Back: Eka Mandiri Jaya Beton; Sleeves: Bank Jateng; Shorts: None
Persikabo 1973	Withdrew				
Persikota	(Indonesia national football team) Didin Gultom	(Indonesia national football team) Jandia Eka Putra	(Indonesia) PGRPN	Moya	List: Front: Farmel, PT Air Kota Tangerang, Salaya Yachts, Gajah Tunggal; Back: Pakar IPAL Indonesia; Sleeves: None; Shorts: None
Persikutim United	(Indonesia national football team) Purwanto Suwondo	(Indonesia national football team) Andika Kurniawan	(Indonesia) Abang Sport	Kaltim Prima Coal^{3}	List: Front: None; Back: None; Sleeves: None; Shorts: None
Persinab Sang Maestro	(Indonesia national football team) Irwansyah	(Indonesia national football team) Herman Dzumafo	(Indonesia) Made by club	Persinab Sang Maestro	List: Front: Bank Papua; Back: None; Sleeves: None; Shorts: None
Persipa	(Indonesia national football team) Eduard Tjong^{1}	(Indonesia national football team) Ikhfanul Alam	(Indonesia) Calma	PSF Group (H & A) / None (3rd)	List: Front: Monster Laut International, Universitas Safin Pati (H & A) / None (3rd); Back: Perumda Air Minum Tirta Bening, Omah Kuno 1868 (H & A) / PSF Group, Monster Laut International, Universitas Safin Pati, PT Eben Haezer Logam, Perumda Air Minum Tirta Bening, Omah Kuno 1868, Bank Jateng (3rd); Sleeves: PT Eben Haezer Logam (H & A) / None (3rd); Shorts: None
Persitara	(Indonesia national football team) Robby Darwis	(Indonesia national football team) Agung Pribadi	(Indonesia) Arafs Apparel	Jakarta Utara	List: Front: PT Savana Charta Indonesia, Bosowa Corp, Forum RT-RW DKI Jakarta, Pelindo; Back: Persitara Rumah Kolaborasi; Sleeves: NETtra Network, First Target Image; Shorts: None
PSDS	(Indonesia national football team) Dodik Wahyudi	(Indonesia national football team) Kurniawan	(Indonesia) WWJD Sport	WWJD Sport	List: Front: None; Back: None; Sleeves: Dina Ciputra; Shorts: None
PSGC	(Indonesia national football team) Herry Kiswanto	(Indonesia national football team) Ganjar Kurniawan	(Indonesia) Zestien	Bank BJB	List: Front: Putra AR; Back: None; Sleeves: Sanema Tour; Shorts: None
RANS Nusantara	(Indonesia national football team) Joko Susilo	(Indonesia national football team) Abanda Rahman	(Indonesia) Samba Apparel	Doc & Boy	List: Front: None; Back: None; Sleeves: TCT; Shorts: None
Tri Brata Rafflesia	(Indonesia national football team) M. Nasir	(Indonesia national football team) Bayu Noperanda	(Indonesia) Nine	KONI Provinsi Bengkulu	List: Front: Bengkulu Merah Putih, Indomaret, PT Dua Satu Konstruksi Bengkulu; Back: PT Rodateknindo Putrajaya, Pegadaian; Sleeves: BSC Nusantara, Rio Hotel; Shorts: None
Waanal Brothers	(Indonesia national football team) Sahala Saragih	(Indonesia national football team) Yanto Basna	(Indonesia) QZF	Waanal Coffee & Co.	List: Front: None; Back: None; Sleeves: None; Shorts: None

1. Caretaker.
2. Apparel made by club.
3. Persikutim United were without a sponsor until matchweek 13.

=== Coaching changes ===
==== Pre-season ====
Team	Outgoing head coach	Manner of departure	Date of vacancy	Replaced by	Date of appointment
Persibo	(Indonesia) Riswandi	End of contract	1 March 2025	(Indonesia) Iwan Setiawan	9 June 2025
Persikabo 1973	(Indonesia) Budiardjo Thalib	End of contract	1 March 2025	(Indonesia)	
Persewar	(Indonesia) Eduard Ivakdalam	End of contract	1 March 2025	(Indonesia)	
Gresik United	(Indonesia) Djadjang Nurdjaman	End of contract	1 March 2025	(Indonesia) Andik Ardiansyah	31 July 2025
PSDS	(Indonesia) Nasrul Koto	End of contract	1 March 2025	(Indonesia)	
Nusantara Lampung	(Indonesia) Stefan Keeltjes	End of contract	1 March 2025	(Indonesia)	
RANS Nusantara	(Indonesia) Edy Sugiarto	End of contract	1 March 2025	(Indonesia) Joko Susilo	14 July 2025
Persikota	(Indonesia) Miftahudin	End of contract	1 March 2025	(Indonesia) Didin Gultom	5 July 2025
Perserang	(Indonesia) Ricky Riskandi	End of contract	1 March 2025	(Indonesia) Bonggo Pribadi	20 July 2025
Persiba Bantul	(Indonesia) Bambang Sumantri	End of contract	1 March 2025	(Indonesia) Andri Ramawi	3 September 2025
Persipa	(Indonesia) Sasi Kirono	End of caretaker role	1 March 2025	(Indonesia) Rudi Widodo	25 July 2025
Perseden	(Indonesia) A. A. Bramastra	End of contract	1 June 2025	(Indonesia) I Wayan Arsana	6 July 2025
Persikutim United	(Indonesia) Agus Yuwono	Change in ownership	4 June 2025	(Indonesia) Purwanto Suwondo	3 August 2025
Pekanbaru	(Indonesia) Ambrizal	Signed by PSPS	17 June 2025	(Indonesia) Miskardi	1 August 2025
Persebata	(Indonesia) Adnan Mahing	Signed by Persipal	2 August 2025	(Indonesia)	
Persinab Sang Maestro	(Indonesia) Khoirul Anam	Change in ownership	25 August 2025	(Indonesia) Elie Aiboy	25 August 2025
Persika Karanganyar	(Indonesia) Slamet Riyadi	End of contract	1 September 2025	(Indonesia) Ahmad Bustomi	28 September 2025
Dejan	(Indonesia) Budi Sudarsono	End of contract	1 October 2025		

==== During the season ====
Team	Outgoing head coach	Manner of departure	Date of vacancy	Week	Position in table		Replaced by	Date of appointment
Team	Outgoing head coach	Manner of departure	Date of vacancy	Week	Group	Position	Replaced by	Date of appointment
Persipa	(Indonesia) Rudi Widodo	Sacked	4 December 2025	2	A	4th	(Indonesia) Eduard Tjong	5 December 2025
Persibo Bojonegoro	(Indonesia) Iwan Setiawan	Sacked	24 December 2025	7	C	3rd	(Indonesia) Alfiat	27 December 2025
Nusantara Lampung	(Indonesia) Apridiawan	Sacked	12 January 2026	12	A	3rd	(Indonesia) Ismed Sofyan	12 January 2026

== Regular round ==
A total of 24 teams will be drawn into 4 groups of six teams based on the geographical location of their homebase. The regular round will be played in a centralized format of triple round-robin matches.

The winner of each group will qualify for the knockout round, while the 6th-place teams from each group will be relegated to 2026–27 Liga 4.

=== Group A ===
All Group A matches was held at Moch. Soebroto Stadium in Magelang.

Pos	Team	Pld	W	D	L	GF	GA	GD	Pts	Qualification or relegation
1	Dejan (P)	12	10	2	0	30	3	+27	32	Qualification to the knockout round
2	Batavia	12	5	4	3	17	5	+12	19	Qualification to the knockout round
3	Nusantara Lampung	12	3	4	5	10	16	−6	13	
4	Persipa	12	2	4	6	7	15	−8	10	
5	PSDS (R)	12	2	2	8	6	31	−25	8	Qualification to the relegation play-offs
6	Persikabo 1973 (W, R)	0	0	0	0	0	0	0	0	Withdrew from the competition

Source: Liga Nusantara 2025–26
Rules for classification: 1) Points; 2) Head-to-head points; 3) Head-to-head goal difference; 4) Head-to-head goals scored; 5) Goal difference; 6) Goals scored; 7) Fair-play points; 8) Draw.
(P) Promoted; (R) Relegated; (W) Withdrew

=== Group B ===
All Group B matches were held at Kota Barat Football Field, Sriwaru Football Field, UNS Stadium, and Banyuanyar Football Field in Surakarta.

Pos	Team	Pld	W	D	L	GF	GA	GD	Pts	Qualification or relegation
1	PSGC (O, P)	15	9	4	2	23	11	+12	31	Qualification to the knockout round
2	Pekanbaru	15	5	7	3	18	16	+2	22	Qualification to the knockout round
3	Persikota	15	6	3	6	19	23	−4	21	
4	Tri Brata Rafflesia	15	6	1	8	21	23	−2	19	
5	Persitara (X)	15	4	5	6	15	17	−2	17	Qualification to the relegation play-offs
6	Perserang (R)	15	2	6	7	12	18	−6	12	Relegation to the 2026–27 Liga 4

Source: Liga Nusantara 2025–26
Rules for classification: 1) Points; 2) Head-to-head points; 3) Head-to-head goal difference; 4) Head-to-head goals scored; 5) Goal difference; 6) Goals scored; 7) Fair-play points; 8) Draw.
(O) Promotion play-off winner; (P) Promoted; (R) Relegated; (X) Relegation play-off winners

=== Group C ===
All Group C matches were held at Sriwedari Stadium, Kota Barat Football Field, UNS Stadium, and Banyuanyar Football Field in Surakarta.

Pos	Team	Pld	W	D	L	GF	GA	GD	Pts	Qualification or relegation
1	Persika Karanganyar	12	7	2	3	21	11	+10	23	Qualification to the knockout round
2	RANS Nusantara (C, P)	12	6	2	4	14	14	0	20	Qualification to the knockout round
3	Persibo	12	5	3	4	13	13	0	18	
4	Persinab Sang Maestro	12	3	6	3	15	14	+1	15	
5	Persikutim United (X)	12	1	3	8	8	19	−11	6	Qualification to the relegation play-offs
6	Persewar (W, R)	0	0	0	0	0	0	0	0	Withdrew from the competition

Source: Liga Nusantara 2025–26
Rules for classification: 1) Points; 2) Head-to-head points; 3) Head-to-head goal difference; 4) Head-to-head goals scored; 5) Goal difference; 6) Goals scored; 7) Fair-play points; 8) Draw.
(C) Champions; (P) Promoted; (R) Relegated; (W) Withdrew; (X) Relegation play-off winners

=== Group D ===
All Group D matches were held at Gelora 10 November Stadium, THOR Football Field and Pasiran Football Field in Surabaya.

Pos	Team	Pld	W	D	L	GF	GA	GD	Pts	Qualification or relegation
1	Persekabpas	15	8	2	5	15	13	+2	26	Qualification to the knockout round
2	Persiba Bantul	15	6	5	4	20	15	+5	23	Qualification to the knockout round
3	Perseden	15	7	1	7	19	19	0	22 (Note: Head-to-head points: Perseden 6, Gresik United 3.)	
4	Gresik United	15	7	1	7	16	15	+1	22	
5	Persebata (R)	15	5	3	7	13	16	−3	18	Qualification to the relegation play-offs
6	Waanal Brothers (R)	15	5	2	8	18	23	−5	17	Relegation to the 2026–27 Liga 4

Source: Liga Nusantara 2025–26
Rules for classification: 1) Points; 2) Head-to-head points; 3) Head-to-head goal difference; 4) Head-to-head goals scored; 5) Goal difference; 6) Goals scored; 7) Fair-play points; 8) Draw.
(R) Relegated

== Results ==
Teams play each other three times, twice in the first half of the season (home and away) and once in the second half of the season (either home or away) with each team playing 15 matches.

=== Group A ===
Home \ Away	BTV	DJN	NFC	PTI	PDS	PBO	BTV	DJN	NFC	PTI	PDS	PBO
Batavia		0–0	2–0	2–0	0–0			0–1		0–1	4–1	
Dejan	0–0		3–0	4–0	5–0						5–0	
Nusantara Lampung	2–1	1–2		1–1	1–0		0–0	0–5				
Persipa	0–3	1–2	0–0		1–1			0–1	0–0			
PSDS	0–5	1–2	1–5	1–0					1–0	0–3		
Persikabo 1973												

Source: Liga Nusantara 2025–26
Legend: Blue = home team win; Yellow = draw; Red = away team win.
For upcoming matches, an "a" indicates there is an article about the rivalry between the two participants.

Group A Matches

Group A Matchdays (1st Round)
- Times are WIB (UTC+7), as listed by I-League.

==== Matchday 1 ====
29 November 2025
15:00

Persipa	1–2	Dejan
Rohman 22'	Report	33' Suhendri; 68' Bissa

Moch. Soebroto Stadium, Magelang
Referee: Bagus Kurniawan
29 November 2025
19:00

Nusantara Lampung	2–1	Batavia
Putra 12'; Nawawi 33'	Report	34' Nesta

Moch. Soebroto Stadium, Magelang
Referee: Ramadhan Susman

==== Matchday 2 ====
3 December 2025
15:00

Batavia	2–0	Persipa
Alfarizi 31'; Arya 49' (o.g.)	Report

Moch. Soebroto Stadium, Magelang
Referee: Putra Zulfahmi
3 December 2025
19:00

PSDS	1–5	Nusantara Lampung
Hasibuan 68'	Report	31', 61' Putra; 43' Herimukti; 81' Suaib; 90+4' Tegar

Moch. Soebroto Stadium, Magelang
Referee: Untung Santoso

==== Matchday 3 ====
7 December 2025
15:00

Nusantara Lampung	1–2	Dejan
Tegar 17'	Report	51', 87' Bissa

Moch. Soebroto Stadium, Magelang
Referee: Lukman Adiputra
7 December 2025
19:00

Batavia	0–0	PSDS
	Report

Moch. Soebroto Stadium, Magelang
Referee: Abdul Hamid

==== Matchday 4 ====
11 December 2025
15:00

Dejan	5–0	PSDS
Latif 5', 75'; Bissa 25'; Sumadi 48', 57'	Report

Moch. Soebroto Stadium, Magelang
Referee: Syamsul Huda
11 December 2025
19:00

Persipa	0–0	Nusantara Lampung
	Report

Moch. Soebroto Stadium, Magelang
Referee: M. Afdal Gafar

==== Matchday 5 ====
15 December 2025
15:00

Batavia	0–0	Dejan
	Report

Moch. Soebroto Stadium, Magelang
Referee: Arby Adityawan
15 December 2025
19:00

PSDS	1–0	Persipa
Ananda 5'	Report

Moch. Soebroto Stadium, Magelang
Referee: Renaldi

Group A Matchdays (2nd Round)
- Times are WIB (UTC+7), as listed by I-League.

==== Matchday 6 ====
20 December 2025
15:00

Dejan	4–0	Persipa
Bissa 31', 45' (pen.), 90' (pen.); Sumadi 77'	Report

Moch. Soebroto Stadium, Magelang
Referee: M. Afdal Ghafar
20 December 2025
19:00

Batavia	2–0	Nusantara Lampung
Faozan 54'; Alfariz 90+2'	Report

Moch. Soebroto Stadium, Magelang
Referee: Syamsul Huda

==== Matchday 7 ====
23 December 2025
15:00

Nusantara Lampung	1–0	PSDS
Aksah 14'	Report

Moch. Soebroto Stadium, Magelang
Referee: Candra Gunawan
23 December 2025
19:00

Persipa	0–3	Batavia
	Report	9' Faozan; 67' Alfariz; 90+3' Diya

Moch. Soebroto Stadium, Magelang
Referee: Muhammad Ridwan Syafri

==== Matchday 8 ====
26 December 2025
15:00

PSDS	0–5	Batavia
	Report	28' Nur Fizal; 32' Faozan; 36', 55' Zidan; 68' (pen.) Salmani

Moch. Soebroto Stadium, Magelang
Referee: Syahrizan
26 December 2025
19:00

Dejan	3–0	Nusantara Lampung
Zidane 45'; Sumadi 49'; Fathoni 79'	Report

Moch. Soebroto Stadium, Magelang
Referee: Akhmad Nur Wakhid

==== Matchday 9 ====
30 December 2025
15:00

PSDS	1–2	Dejan
Asyawal 62'	Report	10' Julyandy; 34' Shabir

Moch. Soebroto Stadium, Magelang
Referee: Muhammad Ridwan Syafri
30 December 2025
19:00

Nusantara Lampung	1–1	Persipa
Mustafa 45'	Report	89' (o.g.) Surya Rizky

Moch. Soebroto Stadium, Magelang
Referee: Syahrizan

==== Matchday 10 ====
3 January 2026
15:00

Dejan	0–0	Batavia
	Report

Moch. Soebroto Stadium, Magelang
Referee: Yusril Alyasa Akbar
3 January 2026
19:00

Persipa	1–1	PSDS
Ramadhan 90+1'	Report	14' Ananda

Moch. Soebroto Stadium, Magelang
Referee: Purbastiar

Group A Matchdays (3rd Round)
- Times are WIB (UTC+7), as listed by I-League.

==== Matchday 11 ====
7 January 2026
15:00

Nusantara Lampung	0–0	Batavia
	Report

Moch. Soebroto Stadium, Magelang
Referee: Dani Budi Prastya
7 January 2026
19:00

Persipa	0–1	Dejan
	Report	17' Latif

Moch. Soebroto Stadium, Magelang
Referee: Lazarus Irwan Babon

==== Matchday 12 ====
11 January 2026
15:00

PSDS	1–0	Nusantara Lampung
Buntoro 17'	Report

Abu Bakrin Stadium, Magelang
Referee: Dani Budi Prastya
11 January 2026
19:00

Batavia	0–1	Persipa
	Report	20' Irawan

Moch. Soebroto Stadium, Magelang
Referee: Yusril Alyasa Akbar

==== Matchday 13 ====
15 January 2026
15:00

Batavia	4–1	PSDS
Marzuki 12'; Faozan 29', 51'; Nijaya 61'	Report	21' Bayu

Moch. Soebroto Stadium, Magelang
Attendance: 30
Referee: Rizki Syafri Nezla
15 January 2026
19:00

Nusantara Lampung	0–5	Dejan
	Report	28', 61' Latif; 52' Bissa; 55', 87' Riski

Moch. Soebroto Stadium, Magelang
Referee: Ismail Anawona

==== Matchday 14 ====
20 January 2026
15:00

Dejan	5–0	PSDS
Fahlevi 29'; Bissa 51', 72'; Sumadi 68'; Latif 90+3'	Report

Moch. Soebroto Stadium, Magelang
Attendance: 25
Referee: Achmad Hafid Hilmi
20 January 2026
19:00

Persipa	0–0	Nusantara Lampung
	Report

Moch. Soebroto Stadium, Magelang
Referee: Asep Erwansyah

==== Matchday 15 ====
24 January 2026
15:00

PSDS	0–3	Persipa
	Report	Arya 9'; Reza 12'; Rafa 73'

Moch. Soebroto Stadium, Magelang
Referee: Ismail Anawona
24 January 2026
19:00

Batavia	0–1	Dejan
	Report	Aziz 45+1'

Moch. Soebroto Stadium, Magelang
Referee: Rizki Syafri Nezla

=== Group B ===
Home \ Away	PKU	SRG	TNG	PTR	CMS	TRI	PKU	SRG	TNG	PTR	CMS	TRI
Pekanbaru		1–1	2–1	1–1	2–2	1–0					1–2	1–3
Perserang	0–0		1–1	0–1	0–0	0–1	1–1			1–0		1–4
Persikota	0–1	3–1		0–0	0–3	2–0	1–3	3–2		0–0		
Persitara	1–1	0–3	1–2		0–0	4–1	1–2				0–1	
PSGC	1–0	1–1	3–0	1–2		3–1		1–0	2–3			2–1
Tri Brata Rafflesia	1–1	1–0	1–2	1–2	0–1				3–1	3–2		

Source: Liga Nusantara 2025–26
Legend: Blue = home team win; Yellow = draw; Red = away team win.
For upcoming matches, an "a" indicates there is an article about the rivalry between the two participants.

Group B Matches

Group B Matchdays (1st Round)
- Times are WIB (UTC+7), as listed by I-League.

==== Matchday 1 ====
30 November 2025
15:00

Pekanbaru	1–0	Tri Brata Rafflesia
Ichsan 7'	Report

Kota Barat Football Field, Surakarta
Referee: David Son Sasube
1 December 2025
15:00

PSGC	1–1	Perserang
Elang 45'	Report	60' Irpan

Kota Barat Football Field, Surakarta
Referee: Rihul Munandar
1 December 2025
19:00

Persikota	0–0	Persitara
	Report

Kota Barat Football Field, Surakarta
Referee: Arief Syaefuddin

==== Matchday 2 ====
4 December 2025
15:00

Perserang	0–0	Pekanbaru
	Report

Sriwaru Football Field, Surakarta
Referee: Ismail
4 December 2025
19:00

Tri Brata Rafflesia	1–2	Persikota
Kardinando 48'	Report	22' Ega; 33' Faisal

Sriwaru Football Field, Surakarta
Referee: Arif Nurwahyudi
5 December 2025
15:00

Persitara	0–0	PSGC
	Report

Sriwaru Football Field, Surakarta
Referee: Muharam

==== Matchday 3 ====
8 December 2025
15:00

Persikota	0–1	Pekanbaru
	Report	90+3' Witoyo

Kota Barat Football Field, Surakarta
Referee: Rihul Munandar
8 December 2025
19:00

Perserang	0–1	Persitara
	Report	36' Darmawan

Kota Barat Football Field, Surakarta
Referee: Dede Fernando
9 December 2025
15:00

PSGC	3–1	Tri Brata Rafflesia
Elang 21', 44'; Nurfadhilah 67'	Report	19' Iqbal

Kota Barat Football Field, Surakarta
Referee: Deni Nurhidayat

==== Matchday 4 ====
12 December 2025
15:00

Persikota	3–1	Perserang
Mudawam 40' (pen.); Gunawan 62'; Ega 77'	Report	55' Indriyana

Banyuanyar Football Field, Surakarta
Referee: Sudirman
13 December 2025
15:00

Tri Brata Rafflesia	1–2	Persitara
Renaldo 20'	Report	7' Nur Rohman; 38' Mefahmi

Banyuanyar Football Field, Surakarta
Referee: Sugeng Rianto
13 December 2025
19:00

Pekanbaru	2–2	PSGC
Hasan 67'; Armedya 85'	Report	60' Elang; 74' Saputra

Banyuanyar Football Field, Surakarta
Referee: Fitriyanto Mahmudin

==== Matchday 5 ====
16 December 2025
15:00

Perserang	0–1	Tri Brata Rafflesia
	Report	75' Iqbal

Kota Barat Football Field, Surakarta
Referee: Yori Hasrat
16 December 2025
19:00

PSGC	3–0	Persikota
Sidang 45'; Elang 64', 76'	Report

Kota Barat Football Field, Surakarta
Referee: Agung Nugraha
17 December 2025
15:00

Persitara	1–1	Pekanbaru
Nur Rohman 22'	Report	11' Adam

Banyuanyar Football Field, Surakarta
Referee: Tri Damar Ghufron

Group B Matchdays (2nd Round)
- Times are WIB (UTC+7), as listed by I-League.

==== Matchday 6 ====
19 December 2025
15:00

Perserang	0–0	PSGC
	Report

Sriwaru Football Field, Surakarta
Referee: Umar
20 December 2025
15:00

Tri Brata Rafflesia	1–1	Pekanbaru
Rizky 47'	Report	83' Sanjaya

Sriwaru Football Field, Surakarta
Referee: Sudirman
20 December 2025
19:00

Persitara	1–2	Persikota
Nur Rohman 54'	Report	22' Ega; 31' Syahwali

Sriwaru Football Field, Surakarta
Referee: Arif Nurwahyudi

==== Matchday 7 ====
23 December 2025
15:00

Persikota	2–0	Tri Brata Rafflesia
Ega 9', 67'	Report

Banyuanyar Football Field, Surakarta
Referee: Asenda Widha Adhyatama
23 December 2025
15:00

PSGC	1–2	Persitara
Taniyauw 25'	Report	38' Yusra; 79' Nur Rohman

Sriwaru Football Field, Surakarta
Referee: Andi Widiantoro
23 December 2025
19:00

Pekanbaru	1–1	Perserang
Armedya 65'	Report	6' Rokyawan

Banyuanyar Football Field, Surakarta
Referee: Udinrifay

==== Matchday 8 ====
26 December 2025
15:00

Persitara	0–3	Perserang
	Report	73' Habrian; 81' Prasetyo; 86' Indriyana

Sriwaru Football Field, Surakarta
Referee: Rais
26 December 2025
19:00

Tri Brata Rafflesia	0–1	PSGC
	Report	24' Fatta

Sriwaru Football Field, Surakarta
Referee: Budi Prayanto Tarigan
27 December 2025
15:00

Pekanbaru	2–1	Persikota
Sanjaya 7'; Varesia 44'	Report	15' Syahwali

Sriwaru Football Field, Surakarta
Referee: Arfandi Abdullah

==== Matchday 9 ====
29 December 2025
15:00

Persitara	4–1	Tri Brata Rafflesia
Suryana 9'; Mefahmi 12'; Alvi 17' (o.g.); Nur Fadilah 81'	Report	29' Noperanda

Kota Barat Football Field, Surakarta
Referee: Arfandi Abdullah
30 December 2025
15:00

Perserang	1–1	Persikota
Indriyana 78'	Report	64' Rudi

Kota Barat Football Field, Surakarta
Referee: Udinrifay
30 December 2025
19:00

PSGC	1–0	Pekanbaru
Angga 43'	Report

Kota Barat Football Field, Surakarta
Referee: Rais

==== Matchday 10 ====
4 January 2026
15:00

Tri Brata Rafflesia	1–0	Perserang
Nazaludin 30'	Report

Kota Barat Football Field, Surakarta
Referee: Ridwan
4 January 2026
19:00

Pekanbaru	1–1	Persitara
Ichsan 27'	Report	22' (o.g.) Nugraha

Kota Barat Football Field, Surakarta
Referee: Herru Wibawanto
5 January 2026
15:00

Persikota	0–3	PSGC
	Report	Elang 12', 31'; Fatta 88'

Kota Barat Football Field, Surakarta
Referee: Umar

Group B Matchdays (3rd Round)
- Times are WIB (UTC+7), as listed by I-League.

==== Matchday 11 ====
8 January 2026
15:00

Pekanbaru	1–3	Tri Brata Rafflesia
Dwi Guna 23' (pen.)	Report	19' Kardinando; 25' Nazaludin; 29' (pen.) Noperanda

Banyuanyar Football Field, Surakarta
Referee: Zikri Rahmawan
8 January 2026
19:00

Persikota	0–0	Persitara
	Report

Banyuanyar Football Field, Surakarta
Referee: Adi Swasono
9 January 2026
15:00

PSGC	1–0	Perserang
S. Lasut 71'	Report

Banyuanyar Football Field, Surakarta
Referee: Andi Kurniawan

==== Matchday 12 ====
12 January 2026
15:00

Tri Brata Rafflesia	3–1	Persikota
Nazaludin 43', 50'; Eka Putra 81' (o.g.)	Report	13' Ma'rifat

Sriwaru Football Field, Surakarta
Referee: Herru Wibawanto
13 January 2026
15:00

Persitara	0–1	PSGC
	Report	51' Fatta

Sriwaru Football Field, Surakarta
Referee: Ridwan
13 January 2026
19:00

Perserang	1–1	Pekanbaru
Indriyana 63'	Report	85' Al Ghony

Sriwaru Football Field, Surakarta
Referee: Umar

==== Matchday 13 ====
16 January 2026
15:00

PSGC	2–1	Tri Brata Rafflesia
Fatta 75'; G. Kurniawan 82'	Report	42' Nazaludin

Kota Barat Football Field, Surakarta
Referee: Ikhwan Najibullah
17 January 2026
15:00

Persikota	1–3	Pekanbaru
Rivaldi 54'	Report	49' Armedya; 66' (o.g.) Sobirin; 90+6' Ichsan

Kota Barat Football Field, Surakarta
Referee: Putra Zulfahmi
17 January 2026
19:00

Perserang	1–0	Persitara
Indra 30'	Report

Kota Barat Football Field, Surakarta
Referee: Bayu Pratama

==== Matchday 14 ====
20 January 2026
15:00

Tri Brata Rafflesia	3–2	Persitara
Iqbal 21'; Nazaludin 49'; Renaldo 90+1'	Report	53' Nur Rohman; 67' (pen.) Yusra

Sriwaru Football Field, Surakarta
Referee: Isbandi
20 January 2026
19:00

Pekanbaru	1–3	PSGC
Sanjaya 27'	Report	78' Fatir; 89' Shahril

Sriwaru Football Field, Surakarta
Referee: Nanda Hermawan
21 January 2026
15:00

Persikota	3–2	Perserang
Faisal 4'; Ega 52'; Syahwali 90+4'	Report	22' M. Indra; 74' Wowa

Sriwaru Football Field, Surakarta
Referee: Chairul Umam

==== Matchday 15 ====
25 January 2026
15:00

Persitara	1–2	Pekanbaru
Harry 30' (pen.)	Report	5' Armedya; 81' Dwi Guna

UNS Stadium, Surakarta
Referee: Ikhwan Najibullah
25 January 2026
15:00

PSGC	1–3	Persikota
Rahmat 42'	Report	2', 45', 60' Rivaldi

Kota Barat Football Field, Surakarta
Referee: Putra Zulfahmi
25 January 2026
15:00

Perserang	1–4	Tri Brata Rafflesia
Indra 56'	Report	34' Renaldo; 77', 82' Rizky Agung; 88' Kardinando

Sriwaru Football Field, Surakarta
Referee: Nanda Hermawan

=== Group C ===
Home \ Away	PBO	PKA	PKT	PER	RNS	WAR	PBO	PKA	PKT	PER	RNS	WAR
Persibo		1–0	1–1	1–1	0–1			0–2			2–0	
Persika	3–0		1–0	2–3	0–1				2–1		3–0	
Persikutim United	1–2	1–2		1–1	0–1		1–3			1–0	0–3	
Persinab Sang Maestro	1–1	1–3	1–1		3–1		0–1	1–1				
RANS Nusantara	2–1	2–2	2–0	0–0						1–3		
Persewar												

Source: Liga Nusantara 2025–26
Legend: Blue = home team win; Yellow = draw; Red = away team win.
For upcoming matches, an "a" indicates there is an article about the rivalry between the two participants.

Group C Matches

Group C Matchdays (1st Round)
- Times are WIB (UTC+7), as listed by I-League.

==== Matchday 1 ====
29 November 2025
19:00

Persibo	0–1	RANS Nusantara
	Report	90+3' Akbar

Sriwedari Stadium, Surakarta
Attendance: 100
Referee: Wawan Rapiko
30 November 2025
15:00

Persika	1–0	Persikutim United
Abi Defa 5' (pen.)	Report

Banyuanyar Football Field, Surakarta
Referee: Helmy Usman

==== Matchday 2 ====
4 December 2025
15:00

Persinab Sang Maestro	1–3	Persika
Kararbo 72'	Report	22' Romadona; 36' Wahyu; 70' Afghoni

Banyuanyar Football Field, Surakarta
Referee: Ibnu Hajar
4 December 2025
19:00

Persikutim United	1–2	Persibo
Johan Yoga 87'	Report	10' Dwi Lesmana; 83' Aroby

Banyuanyar Football Field, Surakarta
Referee: Fero Arsanto

==== Matchday 3 ====
8 December 2025
15:00

Persikutim United	1–1	Persinab Sang Maestro
Yoga 55'	Report	61' Kararbo

UNS Stadium, Surakarta
Referee: Heri Sulistyo
8 December 2025
19:00

Persika	0–1	RANS Nusantara
	Report	9' Bawuo

UNS Stadium, Surakarta
Referee: Luthfi Kurnia Adisakti

==== Matchday 4 ====
12 December 2025
15:00

Persibo	1–0	Persika
Bayu 79'	Report

UNS Stadium, Surakarta
Referee: Udinrifay
12 December 2025
19:00

RANS Nusantara	0–0	Persinab Sang Maestro
	Report

UNS Stadium, Surakarta
Referee: Rihul Munandar

==== Matchday 5 ====
16 December 2025
15:00

Persikutim United	0–1	RANS Nusantara
	Report	47' Escobar

Banyuanyar Football Field, Surakarta
Referee: Arfandi Abdullah
16 December 2025
19:00

Persinab Sang Maestro	1–1	Persibo
Dwi Nugraha 90+5' (o.g.)	Report	55' Valentino

Banyuanyar Football Field, Surakarta
Referee: Ismail Anawona

Group C Matchdays (2nd Round)
- Times are WIB (UTC+7), as listed by I-League.

==== Matchday 6 ====
20 December 2025
15:00

Persikutim United	1–2	Persika
Johan Yoga 81'	Report	43' Erlangga; 47' Romadona

UNS Stadium, Surakarta
Referee: Rihul Munandar
20 December 2025
19:00

RANS Nusantara	2–1	Persibo
Ruy 81'; Sheva 88'	Report	90+4' Dwi Nugraha

UNS Stadium, Surakarta
Referee: Udinrifay

==== Matchday 7 ====
23 December 2025
15:00

Persika	2–3	Persinab Sang Maestro
Baehaki 28'; Watimena 53'	Report	25' (pen.), 35', 38' Kararbo

UNS Stadium, Surakarta
Referee: Faisal Abdul Wahid
23 December 2025
19:00

Persibo	1–1	Persikutim United
Sausu 90+14'	Report	69' Johan Yoga

UNS Stadium, Surakarta
Referee: Heri

==== Matchday 8 ====
26 December 2025
15:00

RANS Nusantara	2–2	Persika
Rabbani 52'; Alamsyah 89'	Report	4' Baehaki; 8' Abi Defa

Banyuanyar Football Field, Surakarta
Referee: Heru Tri Cahyono
26 December 2025
19:00

Persinab Sang Maestro	1–1	Persikutim United
Kararbo 90+7'	Report	90' Johan Yoga

Banyuanyar Football Field, Surakarta
Referee: Sulis Andri Asmawan

==== Matchday 9 ====
30 December 2025
15:00

Persinab Sang Maestro	3–1	RANS Nusantara
Migau 15'; Kararbo 53' (pen.); Woppi 88'	Report	47' Dwi Firmansyah

UNS Stadium, Surakarta
Referee: Faisal Abdul Wahid
30 December 2025
19:00

Persika	3–0	Persibo
Abi Defa 40'; Romadona 47'; Baehaki 55'	Report

UNS Stadium, Surakarta
Referee: Sulis Andri Asmawan

==== Matchday 10 ====
3 January 2026
15:00

RANS Nusantara	2–0	Persikutim United
Alamsyah 44'; Inzaghi 88'	Report

Banyuanyar Football Field, Surakarta
Referee: Jumardi
3 January 2026
19:00

Persibo	1–1	Persinab Sang Maestro
Bagus 44'	Report	22' Uaga

Banyuanyar Football Field, Surakarta
Referee: Suma

Group C Matchdays (3rd Round)
- Times are WIB (UTC+7), as listed by I-League.

==== Matchday 11 ====
7 January 2026
15:00

Persibo	2–0	RANS Nusantara
Bagus 49'; Nugroho 79'	Report

UNS Stadium, Surakarta
Referee: David Son Sasube
7 January 2026
19:00

Persika	2–1	Persikutim United
Afghoni 1'; Baehaki 29' (pen.)	Report	23' D. Kurniawan

UNS Stadium, Surakarta
Referee: Nurdin Salam

==== Matchday 12 ====
11 January 2026
15:00

Persikutim United	1–3	Persibo
Fandi Eko 13'	Report	40', 80', 84' Nugroho

UNS Stadium, Surakarta
Referee: Suma
11 January 2026
19:00

Persinab Sang Maestro	1–1	Persika
Kararbo 49'	Report	34' Baehaki

UNS Stadium, Surakarta
Referee: Jumardi

==== Matchday 13 ====
15 January 2026
15:00

Persikutim United	1–0	Persinab Sang Maestro
D. Kurniawan 87'	Report

UNS Stadium, Surakarta
Attendance: 100
Referee: Dede Fernando
15 January 2026
19:00

Persika	3–0	RANS Nusantara
Abi Defa 8'; Wibowo 30'; Baehaki 90+3'	Report

UNS Stadium, Surakarta
Referee: Helmy Usman Rohdiman

==== Matchday 14 ====
19 January 2026
15:00

Persibo	0–2	Persika
	Report	73' Romadona; 76' Kiat

UNS Stadium, Surakarta
Referee: Andri Bastian
19 January 2026
19:00

RANS Nusantara	1–3	Persinab Sang Maestro
Bawuo 63' (pen.)	Report	29', 75' Kararbo; 80' Kapissa

UNS Stadium, Surakarta
Referee: M. Rifani

==== Matchday 15 ====
26 January 2026
15:00

Persinab Sang Maestro	0–1	Persibo
	Report	55' Dwi Lesmana

UNS Stadium, Surakarta
Referee: Helmy Usman Rohdiman
26 January 2026
15:00

Persikutim United	0–3	RANS Nusantara
	Report	22' Inzaghi; 44' Rabbani; 63' Dwi Firmansyah

Kota Barat Football Field, Surakarta
Referee: Dede Fernando

=== Group D ===
Home \ Away	GRS	LBT	DEN	PAS	PBA	WAA	GRS	LBT	DEN	PAS	PBA	WAA
Gresik United		0–2	1–2	1–2	1–0	1–2		2–0		0–1	0–0	
Persebata	0–1		1–2	0–1	1–1	1–0				1–0	0–2	0–1
Perseden	2–1	2–0		1–0	1–2	2–0	0–1	1–1				1–4
Persekabpas	2–0	1–3	2–1		1–1	0–1			1–0		1–0	
Persiba	0–2	1–2	3–0	1–1		2–1			2–1			4–2
Waanal Brothers	1–3	1–1	0–3	1–2	1–1		1–2			2–0		

Source: Liga Nusantara 2025–26
Legend: Blue = home team win; Yellow = draw; Red = away team win.
For upcoming matches, an "a" indicates there is an article about the rivalry between the two participants.

Group D Matches

Group D Matchdays (1st Round)
- Times are WIB (UTC+7), as listed by I-League.

==== Matchday 1 ====
30 November 2025
15:00

Persiba	2–1	Waanal Brothers
Samosir 15'; Amping 88'	Report	83' Womsiwor

THOR Football Field, Surabaya
Referee: Asep Erwansyah
30 November 2025
19:00

Perseden	2–0	Persebata
Dedi 52'; Sukarja 68'	Report

THOR Football Field, Surabaya
Referee: Suma
1 December 2025
15:00

Gresik United	1–2	Persekabpas
Ivansyah 90'	Report	31' Surya; 81' Rejau

THOR Football Field, Surabaya
Referee: Bayu Pratama

==== Matchday 2 ====
4 December 2025
15:00

Persebata	1–1	Persiba
Baghi 66'	Report	4' (pen.) Rohmatuloh

Pasiran Football Field, Surabaya
Referee: Samsul Efendi
5 December 2025
15:00

Persekabpas	2–1	Perseden
Wardan 41'; Zacha 86'	Report	56' Andika

Pasiran Football Field, Surabaya
Referee: Ikhlas Jasmon
5 December 2025
19:00

Waanal Brothers	1–3	Gresik United
Andryansyah 6' (pen.)	Report	17' (pen.) Alif; 20' Agung; 54' Herlian

THOR Football Field, Surabaya
Referee: Fadlan

==== Matchday 3 ====
8 December 2025
15:00

Gresik United	1–0	Persiba
Pratama 87'	Report

Pasiran Football Field, Surabaya
Referee: Suma
9 December 2025
15:00

Persebata	0–1	Persekabpas
	Report	24' Wardan

THOR Football Field, Surabaya
Referee: Nanda Hermawan
9 December 2025
19:00

Perseden	2–0	Waanal Brothers
Reza 17'; Dedi 86'	Report

THOR Football Field, Surabaya
Referee: Yoga Verry Christanto

==== Matchday 4 ====
12 December 2025
15:00

Gresik United	0–2	Persebata
	Report	25' Baghi; 65' Sambi

Pasiran Football Field, Surabaya
Referee: Hafiz Kurniatama
12 December 2025
19:00

Persiba	3–0	Perseden
Nuri 14'; Rohmatuloh 53'; Faizal 82'	Report

THOR Football Field, Surabaya
Referee: Woltri Effendi
13 December 2025
15:00

Waanal Brothers	1–2	Persekabpas
Bahari 90+7'	Report	33' Pamungkas; 53' Mashori

Pasiran Football Field, Surabaya
Referee: Andri Bastian

==== Matchday 5 ====
16 December 2025
15:00

Perseden	2–1	Gresik United
Dedi 44'; Gunawan 51'	Report	2' (pen.) Ivansyah

THOR Football Field, Surabaya
Referee: Djefri Anggara Putra
16 December 2025
19:00

Persebata	1–0	Waanal Brothers
Baghi 68'	Report

THOR Football Field, Surabaya
Referee: Lukman Setiawan
17 December 2025
15:00

Persekabpas	1–1	Persiba
Pamungkas 66'	Report	74' Dwiyan

Pasiran Football Field, Surabaya
Referee: Athfin Adi Utama Kurfia

Group D Matchdays (2nd Round)
- Times are WIB (UTC+7), as listed by I-League.

==== Matchday 6 ====
19 December 2025
15:00

Persebata	1–2	Perseden
Baghi 76' (pen.)	Report	39' Antha Wijaya; 64' Alfian

Pasiran Football Field, Surabaya
Referee: Andri Bastian
20 December 2025
15:00

Persekabpas	2–0	Gresik United
Surya 22'; Deco 80'	Report

Pasiran Football Field, Surabaya
Referee: Woltri Effendi
20 December 2025
19:00

Waanal Brothers	1–1	Persiba
Sitawa 34'	Report	54' Kaka

THOR Football Field, Surabaya
Referee: Hafiz Kurniatama

==== Matchday 7 ====
23 December 2025
15:00

Gresik United	1–2	Waanal Brothers
Alif 19'	Report	40' (pen.) Manuri; 90+2' Bahari

Pasiran Football Field, Surabaya
Attendance: 100
Referee: Ido Hardo Kesuma
23 December 2025
15:00

Perseden	1–0	Persekabpas
Umarella 54'	Report

THOR Football Field, Surabaya
Referee: Risman
23 December 2025
19:00

Persiba	1–2	Persebata
Samosir 10'	Report	16' Baghi; 45' Sambi

THOR Football Field, Surabaya
Referee: Dede Sulaiman

==== Matchday 8 ====
26 December 2025
15:00

Persiba	0–2	Gresik United
	Report	6' Anoraga; 10' Agong

Pasiran Football Field, Surabaya
Referee: Nur Yasin
26 December 2025
19:00

Waanal Brothers	0–3	Perseden
	Report	25', 39' Suamatya; 50' Dedi

THOR Football Field, Surabaya
Referee: Ferdianto Lumula
27 December 2025
15:00

Persekabpas	1–3	Persebata
Husnuzhon 57'	Report	41', 88' Sambi; 78' Toi

Pasiran Football Field, Surabaya
Referee: Fandro Memah

==== Matchday 9 ====
29 December 2025
15:00

Perseden	1–2	Persiba
Sukarja 90+10' (pen.)	Report	72' Nuri; 78' Husaeni

Pasiran Football Field, Surabaya
Referee: Ido Hardo Kesuma
30 December 2025
15:00

Persekabpas	0–1	Waanal Brothers
	Report	47' Bahari

THOR Football Field, Surabaya
Referee: Nur Yasin
30 December 2025
19:00

Persebata	0–1	Gresik United
	Report	55' Herlian

THOR Football Field, Surabaya
Referee: Risman

==== Matchday 10 ====
4 January 2026
15:00

Persiba	1–1	Persekabpas
Samosir 80'	Report	78' Husnuzhon

Pasiran Football Field, Surabaya
Referee: Helmi Suhendra
4 January 2026
19:00

Gresik United	1–2	Perseden
Agung 61'	Report	68' Prasetiyo; 77' Antha Wijaya

THOR Football Field, Surabaya
Referee: Riki Sobirin
5 January 2026
15:00

Waanal Brothers	1–1	Persebata
Bahari 73'	Report	35' Ilham

Pasiran Football Field, Surabaya
Referee: Niko Prihantoro

Group D Matchdays (3rd Round)
- Times are WIB (UTC+7), as listed by I-League.

==== Matchday 11 ====
8 January 2026
15:00

Gresik United	0–1	Persekabpas
	Report	54' Osman

Pasiran Football Field, Surabaya
Referee: Dicky Reza Sumaila
9 January 2026
15:00

Persiba	4–2	Waanal Brothers
Rohmatuloh 39'; Rahmatullah 62'; Samosir 71'; Firdaus 84'	Report	68' Bahari; 85' Andryansyah

THOR Football Field, Surabaya
Referee: Andriansyah
9 January 2026
19:00

Perseden	1–1	Persebata
Adinata 18'	Report	90+3' Cavalera

THOR Football Field, Surabaya
Referee: Suhaydi

==== Matchday 12 ====
12 January 2026
15:00

Waanal Brothers	1–2	Gresik United
Andryansyah 18'	Report	52' Agong; 58' Ardiansyah

Pasiran Football Field, Surabaya
Attendance: 50
Referee: Helmi Suhendra
12 January 2026
19:00

Persekabpas	1–0	Perseden
Pamungkas 53'	Report

THOR Football Field, Surabaya
Referee: Riki Sobirin
13 January 2026
15:00

Persebata	0–2	Persiba
	Report	41', 45' Rohmatuloh

Pasiran Football Field, Surabaya
Referee: Niko Prihantoro

==== Matchday 13 ====
16 January 2026
15:00

Perseden	1–4	Waanal Brothers
Sukarja 68'	Report	10', 54', 56' Womsiwor; 78' Bahari

Pasiran Football Field, Surabaya
Referee: Wahyudin
17 January 2026
15:00

Gresik United	0–0	Persiba
	Report

THOR Football Field, Surabaya
Referee: Hamdi
17 January 2026
19:00

Persebata	1–0	Persekabpas
K. Anwar 68'	Report

THOR Football Field, Surabaya
Referee: Sugito Ahia

==== Matchday 14 ====
20 January 2026
15:00

Persiba	2–1	Perseden
Rohmatuloh 9' (pen.); Husaeni 69'	Report	32' K. Yoga

Pasiran Football Field, Surabaya
Attendance: 67
Referee: Arif Nurwahyudi
21 January 2026
15:00

Waanal Brothers	2–0	Persekabpas
Womsiwor 7'; Bahari 90+6'	Report

Pasiran Football Field, Surabaya
Attendance: 100
Referee: Wawan Rafiko
21 January 2026
19:00

Gresik United	2–0	Persebata
Kader 46'; Herlian 81'	Report

THOR Football Field, Surabaya
Attendance: 100
Referee: Rihul Munandar

==== Matchday 15 ====
25 January 2026
15:00

Perseden	0–1	Gresik United
	Report	77' Kader

Gelora 10 November Stadium, Surabaya
Referee: Wawan Rafiko
25 January 2026
15:00

Persekabpas	1–0	Persiba
Praganta 15'	Report

Pasiran Football Field, Surabaya
Attendance: 100
Referee: Takuya Kobayashi (Japan)
25 January 2026
15:00

Persebata	0–1	Waanal Brothers
	Report	15' Andryansyah

THOR Football Field, Surabaya
Referee: Arif Nurwahyudi

== Results by matchday ==
=== Group A ===
Team ╲ Round	1	2	3	4	5	6	7	8	9	10	11	12	13	14	15
Batavia	L	W	D	★	D	W	W	W	★	D	D	L	W	★	L
Dejan	W	★	W	W	D	W	★	W	W	D	W	★	W	W	W
Nusantara Lampung	W	W	L	D	★	L	W	L	D	★	D	L	L	D	★
Persikabo 1973	C	C	C	C	C	C	C	C	C	C	C	C	C	C	C
Persipa	L	L	★	D	L	L	L	★	D	D	L	W	★	D	W
PSDS	★	L	D	L	W	★	L	L	L	D	★	W	L	L	L

Source: Liga Nusantara 2025–26

Notes:

- ★ Teams that didn't play on the aforementioned matchday.

=== Group B ===
Team ╲ Round	1	2	3	4	5	6	7	8	9	10	11	12	13	14	15
Pekanbaru	W	D	W	D	D	D	D	W	L	D	L	D	W	L	W
Perserang	D	D	L	L	L	D	D	W	D	L	L	D	W	L	L
Persikota	D	W	L	W	L	W	W	L	D	L	D	L	L	W	W
Persitara	D	D	W	W	D	L	W	L	W	D	D	L	L	L	L
PSGC	D	D	W	D	W	D	L	W	W	W	W	W	W	W	L
Tri Brata Rafflesia	L	L	L	L	W	D	L	L	L	W	W	W	L	W	W

Source: Liga Nusantara 2025–26

=== Group C ===
Team ╲ Round	1	2	3	4	5	6	7	8	9	10	11	12	13	14	15
Persewar	C	C	C	C	C	C	C	C	C	C	C	C	C	C	C
Persibo	L	W	★	W	D	L	D	★	L	D	W	W	★	L	W
Persika Karanganyar	W	W	L	L	★	W	L	D	W	★	W	D	W	W	★
Persikutim United	L	L	D	★	L	L	D	D	★	L	L	L	W	★	L
Persinab Sang Maestro	★	L	D	D	D	★	W	D	W	D	★	D	L	W	L
RANS Nusantara	W	★	W	D	W	W	★	D	L	W	L	★	L	L	W

Source: Liga Nusantara 2025–26

Notes:

- ★ Teams that didn't play on the aforementioned matchday.

=== Group D ===
Team ╲ Round	1	2	3	4	5	6	7	8	9	10	11	12	13	14	15
Gresik United	L	W	W	L	L	L	L	W	W	L	L	W	D	W	W
Persebata	L	D	L	W	W	L	W	W	L	D	D	L	W	L	L
Perseden	W	L	W	L	W	W	W	W	L	W	D	L	L	L	L
Persekabpas	W	W	W	W	D	W	L	L	L	D	W	W	L	L	W
Persiba Bantul	W	D	L	W	D	D	L	L	W	D	W	W	D	W	L
Waanal Brothers	L	L	L	L	L	D	W	L	W	D	L	L	W	W	W

Source: Liga Nusantara 2025–26

== Knockout round ==
In the knockout round, the eight teams from each group will face each other in single leg match. The finalists and promotion play-off winner of the 2025–26 Liga Nusantara will be promoted to the 2026–27 Championship, while two relegation play-off losers along with four sixth-placed team in regular round will be relegated to 2026–27 Liga 4.

=== Bracket ===
Quarter-finals
30 January – Surakarta (KB)
Dejan (a.e.t.)	4
Pekanbaru	2
30 January – Surakarta (KB)
PSGC (p)	2 (6)
Batavia	2 (5)
31 January – Surakarta (UNS)
Persika Karanganyar	1 (2)
Persiba Bantul (p)	1 (4)
31 January – Surakarta (UNS)
Persekabpas	0
RANS Nusantara	2

Semi-finals
3 February – Surakarta (SW)
Dejan	2
PSGC	0
3 February – Surakarta (SW)
Persiba Bantul	1
RANS Nusantara	2

Final
8 February – Surakarta (SW)
Dejan	2 (3)
RANS Nusantara (p)	2 (4)
Promotion play-off
7 February – Surakarta (SW)
PSGC (p)	2 (4)
Persiba Bantul	2 (2)

Relegation play-offs 1 February – Surakarta (UNS)
PSDS	0
Persitara	1
2 February – Surakarta (UNS)
Persikutim United	2
Persebata	0

=== Quarter-finals ===
30 January 2026
15:00

Dejan	4–2 (a.e.t.)	Pekanbaru
Ramadhan 35'; Julyandhy 45+2'; Sumadi 97'; Fathoni 105'	Report	82' Ichsan; 86' Armedya

Kota Barat Football Field, Surakarta
Referee: Takuya Kobayashi (Japan)

30 January 2026
19:45

PSGC	2–2 (a.e.t.)	Batavia
G. Kurniawan 73'; Abid 105+1' (o.g.)	Report	85' Nijaya; 99' Bagaskara
Penalties
Taniyauw (penalty scored); Elang (penalty scored); Fatta (penalty scored); G. Kurniawan (penalty scored); Nurfadillah (penalty scored); Fikram (penalty scored)	6–5	(penalty scored) Alfariz; (penalty scored) Ramadan; (penalty scored) Nur Fizal; (penalty scored) Salmani; (penalty scored) Firdanna; (penalty missed) Nijaya

Kota Barat Football Field, Surakarta
Referee: Faisal Abdul Wahid

31 January 2026
15:00

Persika Karanganyar	1–1 (a.e.t.)	Persiba Bantul
Arrafi 37'	Report	73' Ahnaf
Penalties
Abi Defa (penalty missed); Afghoni (penalty scored); Romadona (penalty scored); Arrafi (penalty missed)	2–4	(penalty missed) Amping; (penalty scored) Ahnaf; (penalty scored) Restu; (penalty scored) Irawan; (penalty scored) Samosir

UNS Stadium, Surakarta
Referee: Lukman Adiputra

31 January 2026
19:45

Persekabpas	0–2	RANS Nusantara
	Report	27' Rabbani; 52' Bawuo

UNS Stadium, Surakarta
Referee: Suma

=== Relegation play-offs ===
The losers will be relegated to 2026–27 Liga 4.

1 February 2026
15:00

PSDS	0–1	Persitara
	Report	77' Nur Fadilah

UNS Stadium, Surakarta
Referee: Udinrifay

2 February 2026
15:00

Persikutim United	2–0	Persebata
Johan Yoga 53' (pen.); D. Kurniawan 90+1'	Report

UNS Stadium, Surakarta
Referee: Andri Bastian

=== Semi-finals ===
The winners will be promoted to 2026–27 Championship.

3 February 2026
15:00

Dejan	2–0	PSGC
Latif 49'; Fathoni 83'	Report

Sriwedari Stadium, Surakarta
Referee: Muhammad Tri Santoso

3 February 2026
19:45

Persiba Bantul	1–2	RANS Nusantara
Rohmatuloh 68'	Report	14' Escobar; 84' (o.g.) Wibowo

Sriwedari Stadium, Surakarta
Referee: Takuya Kobayashi (Japan)

=== Promotion play-off ===
The winner will be promoted to 2026–27 Championship.

7 February 2026
15:00

PSGC	2–2 (a.e.t.)	Persiba Bantul
Elang 23'; Sidang 45'	Report	40' Ahnaf; 72' Samosir
Penalties
Taniyauw (penalty scored); Elang (penalty scored); Fikram (penalty scored); G. Kurniawan (penalty scored)	4–2	(penalty missed) Restu; (penalty scored) Andi; (penalty missed) Ahnaf; (penalty scored) Scifo

Sriwedari Stadium, Surakarta
Referee: Rio Permana Putra

=== Final ===
8 February 2026
15:00

Dejan	2–2 (a.e.t.)	RANS Nusantara
Bissa 45+2'; Rezavi 92'	Report	Escobar 39'; Ade Saihitua 110' (pen.)
Penalties
Sopian (penalty missed); Suhendri (penalty scored); Fathoni (penalty scored); Rezavi (penalty scored); Sumadi (penalty missed)	3–4	(penalty missed) Ade Saihitua; (penalty scored) Sheva; (penalty scored) Rabbani; (penalty scored) Alamsyah; (penalty scored) Nadief

Sriwedari Stadium, Surakarta
Referee: Wawan Rafiko

== Season statistics ==
=== Top scorers ===
As of 9 February 2026

Rank	Player	Club	Goals
1	(Indonesia) Donald Bissa	Dejan	11
2	(Indonesia) Daud Kararbo	Persinab Sang Maestro	10
2	(Indonesia) Elang Rishandy	PSGC	10
4	(Indonesia) Bahari Kurniawan	Waanal Brothers	7
4	(Indonesia) Abdul Latif	Dejan	7
4	(Indonesia) Fillah Rohmatuloh	Persiba Bantul	7
7	(Indonesia) Yanuar Baehaki	Persika Karanganyar	6
7	(Indonesia) Qoyum Nazaludin	Tri Brata Rafflesia	6
7	(Indonesia) Ega Nugraha	Persikota	6
7	(Indonesia) Wawan Sumadi	Dejan	6
11	(Indonesia) Bayu Nugroho	Persibo	5
11	(Indonesia) Yohanes Baghi	Persebata	5
11	(Indonesia) Faozan Tamami	Batavia	5
11	(Indonesia) Saeful Nur Rohman	Persitara	5
11	(Indonesia) Patrick Womsiwor	Waanal Brothers	5
11	(Indonesia) Johan Yoga Utama	Persikutim United	5

=== Hat-tricks ===
As of 9 February 2026

Player	For	Against	Result	Date
(Indonesia) Donald Bissa	Dejan	Persipa	4–0 (H)	20 December 2025
(Indonesia) Daud Kararbo	Persinab Sang Maestro	Persika Karanganyar	3–2 (A)	23 December 2025
(Indonesia) Bayu Nugroho	Persibo	Persikutim United	3–1 (A)	11 January 2026
(Indonesia) Patrick Womsiwor	Waanal Brothers	Perseden	4–1 (A)	16 January 2026
(Indonesia) Henry Rivaldi	Persikota	PSGC	3–1 (A)	25 January 2026

== See also ==
- 2025–26 Super League
- 2025–26 Championship
- 2025–26 Liga 4
