= Evander Yarangga =

Indonesian association footballer

Personal information
- Full name: Evander Philip Yarangga
- Date of birth: 2 July 1997 (age 29)
- Place of birth: Biak, Indonesia
- Height: 1.77 m (5 ft 10 in)
- Position: Centre-back

Youth career
- 2014–2016: PPLP Papua

Senior career*
Years	Team	Apps	(Gls)
2017	Persemi Mimika	6	(0)
2018	Persewar Waropen	9	(0)
2019	Persela Lamongan	1	(0)
2020	Persewar Waropen	0	(0)
2021	PSBS Biak	7	(0)
- * Club domestic league appearances and goals as of 25 November 2021

Evander Philip Yarangga (born 2 July 1997) is an Indonesian professional footballer who plays as a centre-back.

== Club career ==
=== Persela Lamongan ===
He was signed for Persela Lamongan to play in Liga 1 in the 2019 season. Yarangga made his league debut on 25 August 2019 in a match against TIRA-Persikabo at the Surajaya Stadium, Lamongan.

=== Persewar Waropen ===
Yarangga joined the Persewar Waropen club in the 2020 Liga 2. This season was suspended on 27 March 2020 due to the COVID-19 pandemic. The season was abandoned and was declared void on 20 January 2021.

=== PSBS Biak ===
In 2021, Yarangga signed a contract with Indonesian Liga 2 club PSBS Biak. He made his league debut on 7 October 2021 against Mitra Kukar at the Tuah Pahoe Stadium, Palangka Raya.
