= Farrel Arya =

Indonesian footballer

Personal information
- Full name: Farrel Arya Tri Sandika Supratikno
- Date of birth: 1 July 2002 (age 24)
- Place of birth: Semarang, Indonesia
- Height: 1.78 m (5 ft 10 in)
- Position: Forward

Team information
- Current team: Persibangga Purbalingga
- Number: 32

Youth career
- 2018–2019: PPLP Jateng
- 2019–2020: PSIS Semarang

Senior career*
Years	Team	Apps	(Gls)
2021–2024	PSIS Semarang	3	(0)
2023–2024	→ Sragen United (loan)	6	(3)
2024–2025	757 Kepri Jaya	14	(2)
2025–2026	Persipa Pati	9	(1)
2026–	Persibangga Purbalingga	1	(0)
- * Club domestic league appearances and goals as of 14 November 2026

Farrel Arya Tri Sandika Supratikno (born 1 July 2002) is an Indonesian professional footballer who plays as a forward for Liga Nusantara club Persibangga Purbalingga.

== Club career ==
=== PSIS Semarang ===
He was signed for PSIS Semarang to play in Liga 1 in the 2021 season. He made a special debut in the match against Persikabo 1973 in the 2021 Menpora Cup tournament. Apart from getting the chance to play from the first minute, Farrel also got his name on the scoreboard. Farrel made his professional debut in the league on 17 February 2023 in a match against Persis Solo at the Jatidiri Stadium, Semarang.

== Career statistics ==
=== Club ===
As of 11 January 2026

Club	Season	League			Cup		Continental		Other		Total	
Club	Season	Division	Apps	Goals	Apps	Goals	Apps	Goals	Apps	Goals	Apps	Goals
PSIS Semarang	2021–22	Liga 1	0	0	0	0	–		2 (Note: Appearances in Menpora Cup.)	1	2	1
PSIS Semarang	2022–23	Liga 1	3	0	0	0	–		0	0	3	0
Sragen United (loan)	2023–24	Liga 3	6	3	0	0	–		0	0	6	3
757 Kepri Jaya	2024–25	Liga Nusantara	14	2	0	0	–		0	0	14	2
Persipa Pati	2025–26	Liga Nusantara	7	0	0	0	–		0	0	7	0
Career total			30	5	0	0	0	0	2	1	32	6
