= Slamet Riyadi (footballer) =

Indonesian footballer

Personal information
- Full name: Slamet Riyadi
- Date of birth: 15 November 1981 (age 44)
- Place of birth: Padangsidempuan, Indonesia
- Height: 1.69 m (5 ft 6 1/2 in)
- Position: Defender

Team information
- Current team: Persika Karanganyar (Head coach)

Senior career*
Years	Team	Apps	(Gls)
1998–2001	PSMS Medan	?	(?)
2002–2004	PSPS Pekanbaru	?	(?)
2005	Persema Malang	?	(?)
2006	Sriwijaya	?	(?)
2007	Persikabo Bogor	11	(0)
2008–2009	PSSB Bireun	?	(?)
2009–2010	Sriwijaya	16	(0)
2010–2011	Persela Lamongan	9	(0)
2011	Semen Padang	0	(0)
2011–2012	PS Mojokerto Putra	?	(?)
2012	Persepam Madura United	?	(?)
2012–2013	PSPS Pekanbaru	?	(?)
2014	Persijap Jepara	0	(0)
2014	Persiba Bantul	5	(0)

International career
1999	Indonesia U23	6	(0)
1999–2010	Indonesia	6	(0)

Managerial career
- 2015–2016: PS Kwarta (Assistant coach)
- 2017–2018: Persis Gotong Royong
- 2018–2019: PSBS Biak
- 2020–2021: Banten Jaya
- 2021–2022: Karo United
- 2022–2023: Nusantara United
- 2024–2025: Persika Karanganyar
- * Club domestic league appearances and goals

Slamet Riyadi (born 15 November 1981) is an Indonesian professional football coach and former player.

== Honours ==
Sriwijaya

- Copa Indonesia: 2007–08, 2008–09

Indonesia

- AFF Championship runner-up: 2000
