= Womsiwor =

Womsiwor is a Papuan surname. Notable people with the surname include:

- Friska Womsiwor (born 1995), Indonesian professional footballer
- Patrick Womsiwor (born 2001), Indonesian professional footballer
