= Sílvio Escobar =

Paraguayan footballer (born 1986)

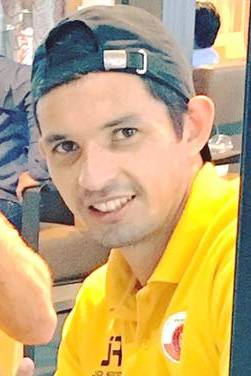
- Escobar with Perseru Serui in 2017

Personal information
- Full name: Sílvio Escobar Benitez
- Date of birth: 18 July 1986 (age 40)
- Place of birth: Asunción, Paraguay
- Height: 1.79 m (5 ft 10 in)
- Position: Forward

Senior career*
Years	Team	Apps	(Gls)
2006	Douglas Haig	19	(7)
2007	San Lorenzo	24	(12)
2008	Tembetary	13	(8)
2009	2 de Mayo	18	(5)
2013	Fernando de la Mora	15	(7)
2014–2015	Persepam Madura Utama	19	(8)
2015–2016	PSM Makassar	3	(0)
2016	Bali United	12	(0)
2017–2019	Perseru Serui	61	(18)
2019	Persija Jakarta	0	(0)
2019	→ PSIS Semarang (loan)	15	(2)
2020–2021	Persikabo 1973	2	(1)
2020–2021	→ PSMS Medan (loan)	0	(0)
2021	Persiraja Banda Aceh	0	(0)
2021–2022	Madura United	25	(0)
2022	Semen Padang	6	(4)
2023–2024	Persela Lamongan	16	(3)
2024	Dejan	4	(0)
2024–2025	Persipa Pati	10	(3)
2025–2026	RANS Nusantara	12	(3)
- * Club domestic league appearances and goals as of 8 February 2026

Sílvio Escobar Benitez (born 18 July 1986) is a Paraguayan professional footballer who plays as a forward for Liga Nusantara club RANS Nusantara.

== Club career ==
=== Persepam Madura United ===
In January 2014, he made his debut with Persepam Madura United against Arema and he scored one goal although the final result Persepam lost 1-3.

=== Perseru Serui ===
In March 2017, Escobar signed a one-year contract with Indonesian Liga 1 club Perseru Serui. He made his debut on 20 April 2017 in a match against Bhayangkara. On 25 April 2017, Escobar scored his first goal for Perseru against Persiba Balikpapan in the 22nd minute at the Marora Stadium, Yapen.

=== Persija Jakarta ===
He was signed for Persija Jakarta to play in Liga 1 in the 2019 season.

==== PSIS Semarang (loan) ====
He was signed for PSIS Semarang to play in the Liga 1 in the 2019 season, on loan from Persija Jakarta. Escobar made his debut on 16 May 2019 in a match against Kalteng Putra. On 26 June 2019, Escobar scored his first goal for PSIS against Badak Lampung in the 3rd minute at the Sumpah Pemuda Stadium, Bandar Lampung. He made 15 league appearances and scored 2 goals for PSIS Semarang.

=== TIRA-Persikabo ===
In January 2020, Escobar signed a one-year contract with Indonesian Liga 1 club TIRA-Persikabo. He made his debut on 2 March 2020 in a match against Arema. On 15 March 2020, Escobar scored his first goal for TIRA-Persikabo against Persita Tangerang in the 83rd minute at the Pakansari Stadium, Bogor.

==== PSMS Medan (loan) ====
He was signed for PSMS Medan to play in the Liga 2 in the 2020 season, on loan from TIRA-Persikabo. This season was suspended on 27 March 2020 due to the COVID-19 pandemic. The season was abandoned and was declared void on 20 January 2021.

=== Madura United ===
In 2021, Escobar signed a contract with Indonesian Liga 1 club Madura United. He made his league debut on 3 September 2021 in a match against Persikabo 1973 at the Indomilk Arena, Tangerang.

== Personal life ==
Escobar converted to Islam in 2015. He is married to an Indonesian woman. He became a citizen of Indonesia through naturalization in 2018.

== Honours ==
RANS Nusantara

- Liga Nusantara: 2025–26
