= Waanal Brothers F.C. =

Indonesian football club

Waanal Brothers
- Full name: Waanal Brothers Football Club
- Nicknames: The Brothers; Anak dari Kampung Waa (Brothers from Waa Village); Rajawali Emas (Golden Eagles)
- Short name: WBFC
- Founded: 2019; 7 years ago
- Ground: Wania Imipi Stadium; Timika, Central Papua
- Capacity: 10,000
- Owner: Four Brothers
- Manager: Ray Manurung
- Coach: Sahala Saragih
- League: Liga Nusantara
- 2024–25: Liga Nusantara/Relegation Round (Group K), 1st
- Website: Official website
| Home colours | Away colours |

Waanal Brothers Football Club (simply known as WBFC) is an Indonesian football club based in Waa Village, Tembagapura, Mimika Regency, Central Papua. They currently compete in the Liga Nusantara.

== History ==
Waanal Brothers FC was founded in 2019 by four brothers—Ray, Joe, Jason, and Randy Manurung—who grew up in Tembagapura, Mimika Regency. The club's inception was rooted in the founders' involvement with youth football development; in 2018, Ray Gustafson Manurung was appointed by the Indonesian Ministry of Youth and Sports (Kemenpora) to manage the Indonesia U-15 student national team for the IberCup in Portugal. Following the experience abroad, the brothers established the club to provide a professional career path for the young talents they had scouted across the country.

The club entered official competition in the 2022 Liga 3 Papua zone. To signal their ambitions, they appointed former Indonesian international striker Rochy Putiray as head coach. In their debut season, WBFC finished in third place in the regional standings.

In 2023, the management appointed Sahala Saragih, a coach known for promoting teams to higher divisions, to lead the squad. This move proved successful as WBFC secured the 2023 Liga 3 Papua title after an undefeated campaign, recording seven wins and two draws. This victory allowed the club to represent Central Papua in the 2023–24 Liga 3 National Phase.

During the 2023–24 National Phase, WBFC reached the Round of 16 but narrowly missed out on promotion to Liga 2.

== Players ==
=== Current squad ===
As of 29 November 2025

Note: Flags indicate national team as defined under FIFA eligibility rules; some limited exceptions apply. Players may hold more than one non-FIFA nationality.

| No. | Pos. | Nation | Player |
|---|---|---|---|
| 1 | GK | IDN | Isak Payage |
| 2 | DF | IDN | Marthin Rakian |
| 3 | DF | IDN | Elia Sabarofek |
| 4 | DF | IDN | Alezandro Soegiantho |
| 5 | DF | IDN | Sahrul Awadi |
| 6 | MF | IDN | Afrizal Falah |
| 7 | FW | IDN | Adriano Manuri |
| 8 | MF | IDN | Tabernacle Manurung |
| 9 | FW | IDN | Cosmas Karmaka |
| 10 | FW | IDN | Desman Wakerkwa |
| 11 | FW | IDN | Bahari Kurniawan |
| 12 | DF | IDN | Tonci Ramandei |
| 13 | DF | IDN | Yanto Basna (captain) |
| 14 | DF | IDN | Safiyudin Timin |
| 15 | MF | IDN | Yance Silfanus |

| No. | Pos. | Nation | Player |
|---|---|---|---|
| 16 | DF | IDN | Sampari Wardjukur |
| 17 | FW | IDN | Jefron Sitawa |
| 18 | FW | IDN | Natanael Atanay |
| 19 | MF | IDN | Marsello Buara |
| 21 | MF | IDN | Andryansyah |
| 22 | MF | IDN | Josias Osok |
| 23 | DF | IDN | Rhoben Pulanda |
| 24 | FW | IDN | Maurits Hamadi |
| 25 | DF | IDN | Yulius Msen |
| 26 | MF | IDN | Patrick Womsiwor |
| 27 | DF | IDN | Nanda Helvrit |
| 28 | DF | IDN | Morris Yarangga |
| 31 | MF | IDN | Pilemon Okoka |
| 66 | GK | IDN | Alvin Nur Khasan |
| 98 | GK | IDN | Ade Candra Sena |

== Season-by-season records ==
| Season | League/Division | Tms. | Pos. | Piala Indonesia |
|---|---|---|---|---|
| 2022–23 | Liga 3 | season abandoned | | – |
| 2023–24 | Liga 3 | 80 | 3rd, Third round | – |
| 2024–25 | Liga Nusantara | 16 | 1st, Relegation round | – |
| 2025–26 | Liga Nusantara | 24 | 6th in Group D | – |

== Honours ==
- Liga 3 Papua
  - Champion (1): 2023
