= Fillah Rohmatuloh =

Indonesian footballer (born 2003)

Personal information
- Full name: Fillah Rohmatuloh Setia
- Date of birth: 17 May 2003 (age 23)
- Place of birth: Bogor, Indonesia
- Height: 1.67 m (5 ft 6 in)
- Position: Forward

Team information
- Current team: Persiba Bantul
- Number: 14

Youth career
- 2016–2017: Astam
- 2020–2024: Persita Tangerang U20

Senior career*
Years	Team	Apps	(Gls)
2024–2025	Persikabo 1973	7	(0)
2025–	Persiba Bantul	12	(7)
- * Club domestic league appearances and goals as of 4 October 2026

Fillah Rohmatuloh Setia (born 17 May 2003) is an Indonesian professional footballer who plays as a forward for Liga Nusantara club Persiba Bantul.

== Early life ==
Fillah was born and raised in Kampung Warung Sawah, Rumpin village, located within the district of Rumpin in Bogor Regency, West Java. He is the third child of six siblings born to Rustandi and Saidah.

== Club career ==
=== Persikabo 1973 ===
Fillah started his youth career with Astam and the Persita Tangerang youth academy. In August 2024, he signed his first professional contract with Liga 2 side Persikabo 1973. He made seven league appearances and provided one assist during his time with the club.

=== Persiba Bantul ===
In October 2025, Fillah moved to Persiba Bantul of the Liga Nusantara. He instantly became a key player for the team, making 12 appearances and finishing the 2025–26 season as the club's top goalscorer with seven goals, helping Persiba Bantul reach the promotion play-off stage. He scored a brace in a 2–0 win over Persebata Lembata on 13 January 2026.

== International career ==
In November 2021, Fillah received a call to take part in training camp at the Indonesia national under-18 team managed by Bima Sakti in Turkey. In February 2022, he was included in the list of 40 players called up by the Indonesia national team coach, Shin Tae-yong, for the Indonesia national under-18 team training camp in South Korea. This is part of preparations for the 2023 FIFA U-20 World Cup, which was planned to be held in Indonesia (but later changed host).
