= Abdul Rahman Abanda =

Indonesian footballer (born 1990)

Abanda Rahman
Personal information
- Full name: Abdul Rahman Abanda
- Date of birth: 24 August 1990 (age 36)
- Place of birth: Kendari, Indonesia
- Height: 1.81 m (5 ft 11 in)
- Position: Centre-back

Team information
- Current team: Gresik United

Youth career
- 2008: PSM Makassar
- 2009: Perseba Bangkalan

Senior career*
Years	Team	Apps	(Gls)
2010–2011	PPSM Magelang	13	(3)
2012	Madiun Putra	5	(0)
2012–2013	Persepar Palangkaraya	19	(0)
2013–2014	PSM Makassar	17	(0)
2015–2016	Martapura	4	(0)
2017	Gresik United	0	(0)
2017	Persik Kediri	13	(3)
2018	PSPS Riau	6	(1)
2018	Persis Solo	7	(0)
2019	Kalteng Putra	15	(0)
2020–2021	PSIS Semarang	2	(0)
2021	→ Lalenok United	0	(0)
2021–2022	Bhayangkara	4	(0)
2022–2023	Madura United	1	(0)
2023	Bhayangkara	6	(0)
2024	Sriwijaya	3	(0)
2025–2026	RANS Nusantara	14	(0)
2026–	Gresik United	0	(0)
- * Club domestic league appearances and goals as of 23:57, 8 February 2026 (UTC)

Abdul Rahman Abanda (born 24 August 1990), known as Abanda Rahman, is an Indonesian professional footballer who plays as a centre-back for Liga Nusantara club Gresik United.

== Early life ==
His popular nickname "Abanda" comes from when he was volunteering at an orphanage in Makassar in 2005 and the children there gave him the nickname.

== Club career ==
=== Kalteng Putra ===
In 2019, Abanda Rahman signed a one-year contract with Indonesian Liga 1 club Kalteng Putra. He made his league debut on 26 July 2019 in a match against TIRA-Persikabo at the Pakansari Stadium, Cibinong.

=== PSIS Semarang ===
He was signed for PSIS Semarang to play in Liga 1 in the 2020 season. This season was suspended on 27 March 2020 due to the COVID-19 pandemic. The season was abandoned and was declared void on 20 January 2021.

=== Lalenok United ===
In January 2021, PSIS Semarang announce Rahman was loaned to Lalenok United. He was recruited to ahead of the Liga Futebol Timor-Leste competition and the AFC Cup play-offs. However, because the competition did not run, the PSIS Semarang withdrew Abanda Rahman.

=== Bhayangkara FC ===
In 2021, Abanda Rahman signed a contract with Indonesian Liga 1 club Bhayangkara. He made his league debut on 6 December 2021 in a match against Persela Lamongan at the Maguwoharjo Stadium, Sleman.

=== Madura United ===
Abanda was signed for Madura United to play in Liga 1 in the 2022–23 season. He made his league debut on 20 December 2022 in a match against Arema at the Sultan Agung Stadium, Bantul.

=== Bhayangkara FC ===
In 2023, Abanda Rahman return to Indonesian Liga 1 club Bhayangkara.

== Honours ==
RANS Nusantara

- Liga Nusantara: 2025–26
