= Edgard Amping =

Indonesian association footballer

Personal information
- Full name: Edgard Amping
- Date of birth: 9 June 2003 (age 23)
- Place of birth: Mamuju, Indonesia
- Height: 1.70 m (5 ft 7 in)
- Position: Left-back

Team information
- Current team: Persiba Bantul
- Number: 74

Youth career
- 2012–2017: SSB Mitra Manakarra
- 2017–2019: PSM Makassar
- 2019–2021: Garuda Select

Senior career*
Years	Team	Apps	(Gls)
2021–2025	PSM Makassar	2	(0)
2021	→ Muba Babel United (loan)	6	(1)
2024–2025	→ PSIM Yogyakarta (loan)	2	(0)
2025–	Persiba Bantul	9	(0)

International career^{‡}
2022	Indonesia U20	6	(0)
- * Club domestic league appearances and goals as of 9 January 2026 ‡ National team caps and goals as of 10 July 2022

Edgard Amping (born 9 June 2003) is an Indonesian professional footballer who plays as a left-back for Liga Nusantara club Persiba Bantul.

== Club career ==
=== Early career ===
Amping is a young player born in Mamuju, West Sulawesi, on June 9, 2003. He playing as a left back. Amping started his career at SSB Mitra Manakarra at the age of 11. Together with SSB Mitra Manakarra, he appeared in the 2016 Danone Nations Cup national round in Jakarta.

=== PSM Makassar ===
He was recruited by PSM Makassar U16 in early January 2018. At that time, he was 15 years old. A year later, Amping was promoted to the PSM Makassar U18 team. Together with his squad, his performances continued to be honed and began to get the attention of many coaches. His potential continues to grow after successfully passing the second volume of the Garuda Select program selection in 2019. He received guidance from Des Walker and Dennis Wise. When participating in the second volume of the Garuda Select program, Amping was recorded as the player who played the highest number of matches and playing minutes. His performances during that time made Amping one of the three players who returned to training with the third edition of the Garuda Select program.

==== Muba Babel United (loan) ====
In October 2021, Amping signed a contract with Liga 2 club Muba Babel United on loan from PSM Makassar. Amping made his league debut in a 2–0 lost against PSMS Medan on 11 October as a substitute for Derry Herlangga in the 37th minute. On 15 October, Amping scored his first goal for Muba Babel United against KS Tiga Naga in the 41st minute at the Gelora Sriwijaya Stadium, Palembang.

== International career ==
On 30 May 2022, Edgard made his debut for an Indonesian youth team against a Venezuela U-20 squad in the 2022 Maurice Revello Tournament in France.

== Career statistics ==
=== Club ===
As of 9 January 2026

Appearances and goals by club, season and competition
Club	Season	League			Cup		Continental		Other		Total	
Club	Season	Division	Apps	Goals	Apps	Goals	Apps	Goals	Apps	Goals	Apps	Goals
PSM Makassar	2021–22	Liga 1	0	0	0	0	–		0	0	0	0
PSM Makassar	2022–23	Liga 1	1	0	0	0	–		0	0	1	0
PSM Makassar	2023–24	Liga 1	1	0	0	0	0	0	0	0	1	0
Muba Babel United (loan)	2021	Liga 2	6	1	0	0	–		0	0	6	1
PSIM Yogyakarta (loan)	2024–25	Liga 2	2	0	0	0	–		0	0	2	0
Persiba Bantul	2025–26	Liga Nusantara	9	0	0	0	–		0	0	9	0
Career total			19	1	0	0	0	0	0	0	19	1

== Honours ==
=== Club ===
PSM Makassar

- Liga 1: 2022–23

PSIM Yogyakarta

- Liga 2: 2024–25
