= Johan Yoga Utama =

Indonesian footballer (born 1990)

Johan Yoga
Personal information
- Full name: Johan Yoga Utama
- Date of birth: 19 February 1990 (age 36)
- Place of birth: Semarang, Indonesia
- Height: 1.83 m (6 ft 0 in)
- Position: Striker

Team information
- Current team: Persikutim United
- Number: 90

Youth career
- 2006–2008: PSIS Semarang

Senior career*
Years	Team	Apps	(Gls)
2008–2009	PSIS Semarang	17	(0)
2009–2010	Persiba Balikpapan	15	(2)
2010–2011	Persib Bandung	0	(0)
2011–2012	Persisam Putra	7	(2)
2012–2013	Persiba Balikpapan	16	(2)
2013–2014	Martapura	15	(3)
2015	PSM Makassar	1	(1)
2016–2017	PSIS Semarang	26	(15)
2018	Persis Solo	14	(2)
2018	Persiraja Banda Aceh	4	(0)
2019	Badak Lampung	12	(1)
2020	Semen Padang	1	(0)
2021–2022	Persebaya Surabaya	8	(1)
2022	PSIM Yogyakarta	5	(0)
2023	PPSM Magelang	4	(1)
2024	PSDB United	6	(5)
2025	Persibat Batang	17	(10)
2025–	Persikutim United	11	(5)

International career
2013	Indonesia U23	1	(0)
- * Club domestic league appearances and goals as of 27 March 2026

Johan Yoga Utama (born 19 February 1990) is an Indonesian professional footballer who plays as a striker for Liga Nusantara club Persikutim United.

== Club statistics ==
=== Club ===
As of 11 January 2026

Club	Season	League		Piala Indonesia		Other		Total	
Club	Season	Apps	Goals	Apps	Goals	Apps	Goals	Apps	Goals
PSIS Semarang	2008–09	17	0	0	0	-		17	0
Persiba Balikpapan	2009–10	15	2	1	0	-		16	2
Persib Bandung	2010–11	0	0	-		-		0	0
Persisam Putra Samarinda	2011–12	7	2	-		-		7	2
Persiba Balikpapan	2013	16	2	-		-		16	2
Martapura	2014	15	3	-		-		15	3
PSM Makassar	2015	1	1	-		-		1	1
PSIS Semarang	2016	18	14	-		-		18	14
PSIS Semarang	2017	8	1	-		-		8	1
Badak Lampung	2019	12	1	-		-		12	1
Semen Padang	2020	1	0	-		-		1	0
Persebaya Surabaya	2021–22	8	1	-		-		8	1
PSIM Yogyakarta	2022–23	5	0	-		-		5	0
PPSM Magelang	2022–23	4	1	-		-		4	1
PSDB United	2023–24	6	5	-		-		6	5
Persibat Batang	2024–25	17	10	-		-		17	10
Persikutim United	2025–26	10	4	-		-		10	4
Total		160	47	1	0	0	0	161	47

== Honours ==
=== Individual ===
- Indonesia Soccer Championship B Top Goalscorer: 2016 (14 goals)
