= Abi Defa Marendra =

Indonesian footballer

Personal information
- Full name: Abi Defa Marendra
- Date of birth: 5 November 1999 (age 27)
- Place of birth: Surakarta, Indonesia
- Position: Central midfielder

Team information
- Current team: Persika Karanganyar
- Number: 4

Youth career
- 2019–2020: Persib Bandung

Senior career*
Years	Team	Apps	(Gls)
2021–2023	Dewa United	12	(0)
2023–2024	PSKC Cimahi	11	(0)
2024–2025	Persiku Kudus	11	(1)
2025–	Persika Karanganyar	9	(3)
- * Club domestic league appearances and goals as of 11 January 2026

Abi Defa Marendra (born 5 November 1999) is an Indonesian professional footballer who plays as a central midfielder for Liga Nusantara club Persika Karanganyar.

== Club career ==
=== Dewa United ===
Abi Defa was signed for Dewa United to play in Liga 2 for the 2021–22 season.

== Career statistics ==
=== Club ===
As of 11 January 2026

Club	Season	League			Cup		Other		Total	
Club	Season	Division	Apps	Goals	Apps	Goals	Apps	Goals	Apps	Goals
Dewa United	2021–22	Liga 2	9	0	0	0	0	0	9	0
Dewa United	2022–23	Liga 1	3	0	0	0	0	0	3	0
PSKC Cimahi	2023–24	Liga 2	11	0	0	0	0	0	11	0
Persiku Kudus	2024–25	Liga 2	11	1	0	0	0	0	11	1
Persika Karanganyar	2025–26	Liga Nusantara	9	3	0	0	0	0	9	3
Career total			43	4	0	0	0	0	43	4
