= Patrick Womsiwor =

Indonesian footballer

Personal information
- Full name: Patrick Alfredo Womsiwor
- Date of birth: 26 May 2001 (age 25)
- Place of birth: Sentani, Indonesia
- Height: 1.70 m (5 ft 7 in)
- Position: Midfielder

Youth career
- 2015–2017: PPLP Papua
- 2017–2018: Persipura Jayapura

Senior career*
Years	Team	Apps	(Gls)
2019–2021	Persipura Jayapura	4	(0)
2021	Persewar Waropen	5	(0)
2022	Persipura Jayapura	3	(0)
2023–2024	Barito Putera	5	(0)
2024	Persewar Waropen	2	(0)
2025–2026	Waanal Brothers	11	(5)
2026	Deltras	2	(0)
- * Club domestic league appearances and goals as of 22 February 2026

Patrick Alfredo Womsiwor (born 26 May 2001) is an Indonesian professional footballer who plays as a midfielder.

== Club career ==
=== Persipura Jayapura ===
He was signed for Persipura Jayapura to play in Liga 1. Womsiwor made his league debut on 28 October 2019 against Badak Lampung at the Sumpah Pemuda Stadium, Bandar Lampung.

=== Persewar Waropen ===
In 2021, Womsiwor signed a contract with Indonesian Liga 2 club Persewar Waropen. He made his league debut on 3 November 2021 against Sulut United at the Batakan Stadium, Balikpapan.

=== Barito Putera ===
On 20 January 2023, Womsiwor signed a one-year contract with Liga 1 club Barito Putera from Persipura Jayapura. one day later, Womsiwor made his league debut for the club in a 0–0 draw against Borneo Samarinda, coming on as a substituted Mike Ott.

== Career statistics ==
=== Club ===
As of 22 February 2026.

Club	Season	League			Cup		Continental		Other		Total	
Club	Season	Division	Apps	Goals	Apps	Goals	Apps	Goals	Apps	Goals	Apps	Goals
Persipura Jayapura	2019	Liga 1	3	0	0	0	–		0	0	3	0
Persipura Jayapura	2020	Liga 1	0	0	0	0	–		0	0	0	0
Persipura Jayapura	2021	Liga 1	1	0	0	0	–		0	0	1	0
Persipura Jayapura	Total		4	0	0	0	–		0	0	4	0
Persewar Waropen	2021	Liga 2	5	0	0	0	–		0	0	5	0
Persipura Jayapura	2022–23	Liga 2	3	0	0	0	–		0	0	3	0
Barito Putera	2022–23	Liga 1	3	0	0	0	–		0	0	3	0
Barito Putera	2023–24	Liga 1	2	0	0	0	–		0	0	2	0
Barito Putera	Total		5	0	0	0	–		0	0	5	0
Persewar Waropen	2024–25	Liga 2	2	0	0	0	–		0	0	2	0
Waanal Brothers	2025–26	Liga Nusantara	11	5	0	0	–		0	11	5	0
Deltras	2025–26	Championship	2	0	0	0	–		0	0	2	0
Career total			32	5	0	0	0	0	0	0	32	5
