= Yanto Basna =

Indonesian footballer

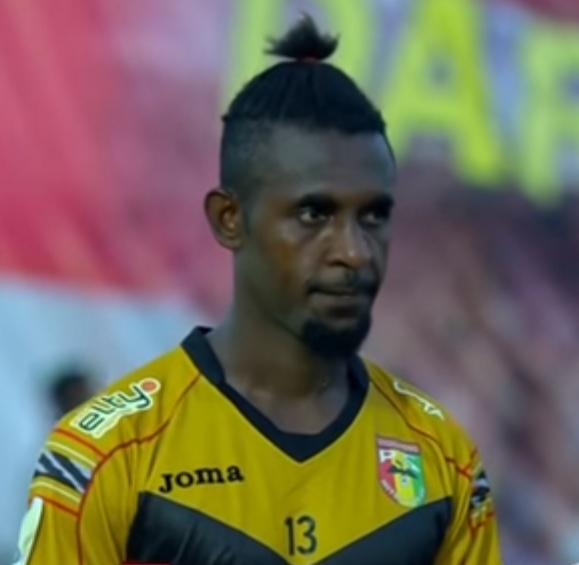
- Basna playing for Mitra Kukar in 2015

Personal information
- Full name: Rudolof Yanto Basna
- Date of birth: 12 June 1995 (age 31)
- Place of birth: Sorong, Indonesia
- Height: 1.83 m (6 ft 0 in)
- Position: Centre-back

Team information
- Current team: Waanal Brothers
- Number: 13

Youth career
- 2011–2012: Deportivo Indonesia
- 2012–2013: Persib Bandung
- 2013–2015: Sriwijaya

Senior career*
Years	Team	Apps	(Gls)
2015–2016	Mitra Kukar	1	(0)
2016	Persib Bandung	18	(0)
2017	Sriwijaya	24	(1)
2018	Khon Kaen	27	(1)
2018–2019	Sukhothai	11	(2)
2020–2021	PT Prachuap	19	(1)
2022–2023	Bhayangkara	0	(0)
2023	Kalteng Putra	8	(0)
2024	PT Prachuap	1	(0)
2025	Persewar Waropen	4	(0)
2025–	Waanal Brothers	5	(0)

International career
2011–2014	Indonesia U19	2	(0)
2016–2019	Indonesia	14	(0)
Medal record
Men's football
Representing Indonesia
AFF Championship
Runner-up	2016 Myanmar & Philippines	Team
- * Club domestic league appearances and goals as of 25 January 2026

Rudolof Yanto Basna (born 12 June 1995) is an Indonesian professional footballer who plays as a centre-back for Liga Nusantara club Waanal Brothers.

== Club career ==
=== Early career ===
Basna started his football career at the age of 15 and entered Deportivo Indonesia training program at the age of 17 in 2011.

In 2013, Basna joined the Sriwijaya U21 team.

=== Mitra Kukar ===
Basna signed for Mitra Kukar in 2015. He helped his team to win the 2015 edition of General Sudirman Cup also becoming the best player of the tournament.

=== Persib Bandung ===
After his impressive performance with Mitra Kukar In 2016, Basna signed for Persib Bandung. but with Persib, Basna did not perform as well as in Mitra Kukar. This happened because Basna was more often plotted at right-back. In fact, his ideal position is a central defender. Basna initially wanted to be retained by Persib when he entered the 2017 season. However, there was a problem that Persib's manager, Umuh Muchtar, had said at the time that Basna's agent had asked for a threefold increase in the contract value if he wanted to keep the player. Finally, Persib chose not to renew Basna's contract.

=== Sriwijaya ===
Basna returned to Sriwijaya for Liga 1 2017. He made 24 appearances and scored one goal, helping his team finish 11th in the league.

==== Move to Thailand ====
When Basna decided to move to Thailand in early 2018, many offers came from big clubs such as Persipura Jayapura and several Malaysian clubs. The contract offered is also fantastic. However, he decided to go to Thailand. The former Sriwijaya player admitted that he was frustrated when he left for Thailand. The reason is, the club that an agent promised him does not exist. He then look after for a local Thai agent to find a club. He was informed that Khon Kaen wanted his services. after doing several trials he was offered a contract.

=== Khon Kaen ===
In 2018 he signed for Thai League 2 club Khon Kaen. He made 27 appearances and 1 goal, helped his team to finish 4th in the league. due to his performance Khon Kaen fans dub him as "The wall of Khon Kaen".

=== Sukhothai ===
In 2019, Basna signed for Thai League 1 club, Sukhothai. He made 11 appearances and scored 2 goals, as his team finish 12th in the league.

=== PT Prachuap ===
On 5 January 2020, Basna was officially introduced as a PT Prachuap player. Two days later, he made his first team debut and scored his first goal for the club, in a 1–0 win against Port. On 17 March 2021, Basna scored his first league goal for PT Prachuap with his right foot volley in a 1–0 win against Muangthong United. Basna helped his team finish 10th in the league with 19 appearances and 1 goal, missing most games due to injury. On 2 June 2021, Basna renewed his contract with the club for an undisclosed duration. On 5 January 2022, it was announced that Basna had left PT Prachuap as his contract with the club had expired.

=== Bhayangkara ===
On 21 April 2022, Bhayangkara's COO Sumardji confirmed that Basna had signed a two-year contract for the club.

=== Return to PT Prachuap ===
On 9 January 2024, Basna officially returned to the Thai club, PT Prachuap.

== International career ==
In 2014, Basna represented the Indonesia U-19, in the 2014 AFC U-19 Championship. On 6 September 2016 Basna made his senior debut, in a 3–0 win against Malaysia. Basna was part of the team that reached the 2016 AFF Championship final Basna fell out of favour of new manager Luis Milla, thus saw him missing international games in 2017 until 2018.

Basna regained his position back in the national team, after being selected by Simon McMenemy for the 2022 FIFA World Cup qualification. Basna played his first match since 2016, on the second matchday of The World Cup qualifier against Thailand, where his team lost 3–0 at Gelora Bung Karno Stadium. On 19 November 2019, Basna first time captained the team against Malaysia at the fifth matchday of World Cup qualification, playing away at Bukit Jalil National Stadium, Indonesia lost 2–0. Basna was deemed fault for the goals and his captaincy was questionable by the supporters, caretaker coach Yeyen Tumena admitted that Indonesian players were down mentally, as they have lost all 4 qualification matches. He stated that three senior players refused to be captains and participate in the press conference. He admitted that Basna is the only player who is willing to be the captain.

== Personal life ==
Basna's parents are Ottys Basna Lestusen and Jekelina Yumamme. Basna has one older sister, one younger sister and two younger brothers, one of whom is a football player Elisa Basna. Basna is a graduate of Ragunan High School, he continued his education to Yogyakarta at Yogyakarta State University (UNY), the Teaching Faculty of Education with a concentration in sports.

Basna's dad, Ottys Basna died before the match between Sriwijaya and Mitra Kukar.

Basna used the prize money of the 2015 General Sudirman Cup best player to donate to Alfin Tuasalamony while treating his broken leg, some donated to the church, some distributed to his friends and the rest to his family.

== Career statistics ==
=== Club ===
As of match played 30 December 2025

Club	Season	League			Cup (Note: Includes Thai FA Cup)		Continental		Other (Note: Appearances in Thai League Cup)		Total	
Club	Season	Division	Apps	Goals	Apps	Goals	Apps	Goals	Apps	Goals	Apps	Goals
Mitra Kukar	2015	Indonesia Super League	1	0	0	0	–		9 (Note: Appearances in General Sudirman Cup)	0	10	0
Persib Bandung	2016	ISC A	18	0	0	0	–		0	0	18	0
Sriwijaya	2017	Liga 1	24	1	0	0	–		0	0	24	1
Khon Kaen	2018	Thai League 2	27	1	1	0	–		1	0	29	1
Sukhothai	2019	Thai League 1	11	2	0	0	–		0	0	11	2
PT Prachuap	2020–21	Thai League 1	19	1	0	0	–		0	0	19	1
PT Prachuap	2021–22	Thai League 1	0	0	0	0	–		0	0	0	0
PT Prachuap	Total		19	1	0	0	–		0	0	19	1
Bhayangkara	2022–23	Liga 1	0	0	0	0	–		0	0	0	0
Kalteng Putra	2023–24	Liga 2	8	0	0	0	–		0	0	8	0
PT Prachuap	2023–24	Thai League 1	1	0	0	0	–		0	0	1	0
Persewar Waropen	2024–25	Liga 2	4	0	0	0	–		0	0	4	0
Waanal Brothers	2025–26	Liga Nusantara	2	0	0	0	–		0	0	2	0
Career total			115	5	1	0	–		10	0	126	5

=== International ===
As of match played 19 November 2019

Appearances and goals by national team and year
National team	Year	Apps	Goals
Indonesia	2016	7	0
Indonesia	2017	0	0
Indonesia	2018	0	0
Indonesia	2019	7	0
Total		14	0

== Honours ==
Mitra Kukar

- General Sudirman Cup: 2015

Indonesia

- AFF Championship runner-up: 2016

Individual

- General Sudirman Cup Best Player: 2015
