= Ganjar Kurniawan =

Indonesian footballer (born 1994)

Personal information
- Full name: Ganjar Kurniawan
- Date of birth: 14 August 1994 (age 32)
- Place of birth: Bandung, Indonesia
- Height: 1.75 m (5 ft 9 in)
- Position: Attacking midfielder

Team information
- Current team: PSGC Ciamis
- Number: 14

Youth career
- 2010–2012: PSGC Ciamis U18

Senior career*
Years	Team	Apps	(Gls)
2012–2017	PSGC Ciamis	35	(6)
2017–2018	Persela Lamongan	0	(0)
2019–	PSGC Ciamis	71	(10)
- * Club domestic league appearances and goals as of 7 February 2026

Ganjar Kurniawan (born 14 August 1994) is an Indonesian professional footballer who plays as an attacking midfielder for Championship club PSGC Ciamis.

== Club career ==
=== PSGC Ciamis ===
Born in Bandung, Kurniawan entered the youth apparatus of PSGC Ciamis in 2010, initially representing the academy side in the regional Soeratin Cup tournament. He was promoted to the first-team structure in 2012, helping the club progress sequentially through the structural lower divisions, ultimately playing a critical role during their campaign in the 2017 Liga 2, where he recorded six goals.

=== Persela Lamongan ===
In December 2017, following a successful trial session, Kurniawan joined top-tier club Persela Lamongan ahead of the 2018 Liga 1 line-up. He participated in early tactical deployments during the 2018 Piala Presiden pre-season fixtures; however, he was formally released from his contract phase in February 2018 before recording a domestic top-tier league appearance.

=== Return to PSGC Ciamis ===
On 1 January 2019, Kurniawan officially returned to his home team PSGC Ciamis to play in 2019 Liga 2. On 23 June 2019, he made his league debut by starting in a 0–1 home lose against Persita Tangerang. On 13 July 2019, Kurniawan scored his first goal with a brace in a 2–3 home lose against Persiraja Banda Aceh. On 28 July 2019, he scored the opening goal for PSGC Ciamis against PSPS Pekanbaru in the 20th minute, the score ended 3–1 win for PSGC Ciamis.

On 26 August 2026, he formally signed a long-term contract renewal extension keeping him with PSGC Ciamis until June 2027 to spearhead their campaign in the 2026–27 Championship.
