= Ahmad Bustomi =

Indonesian footballer (born 1985)

Personal information
- Full name: Ahmad Bustomi
- Date of birth: 13 July 1985 (age 41)
- Place of birth: Jombang, Indonesia
- Height: 1.67 m (5 ft 6 in)
- Position: Midfielder

Team information
- Current team: Indonesia U17 (Assistant Coach)

Youth career
- 2001: SSB Unibraw 82
- 2002–2003: Persema Malang

Senior career*
Years	Team	Apps	(Gls)
2004–2005	Persikoba Batu	4	(0)
2005–2008	Persema Malang	58	(4)
2008–2011	Arema Malang	59	(2)
2011–2013	Mitra Kukar	61	(4)
2014–2017	Arema	48	(4)
2018–2019	Mitra Kukar	12	(0)
2020–2021	Persela Lamongan	18	(0)
2022	Persija Jakarta	7	(0)
2022–2023	PSMS Medan	2	(1)
2023–2024	Arema	1	(0)
2023–2024	→ Persikab Bandung (loan)	6	(0)
Total		276	(15)

International career
2006–2007	Indonesia U23		(1)
2010–2014	Indonesia	28	(0)

Managerial career
- 2024–2025: Persema Malang
- 2025–2026: Persika Karanganyar
- 2026–: Indonesia U17 (assistant coach)
Medal record
Men's football
Representing Indonesia
AFF Championship
Runner-up	2010 Indonesia & Vietnam	Team
- * Club domestic league appearances and goals

Ahmad Bustomi (born 13 July 1985) is an Indonesian former footballer who plays as a midfielder. He is one of the 2007 Sea Games team member Ivan Kolev upbringing. His favourite players are Bima Sakti and Andrea Pirlo. He made his national team debut in a friendly match against Uruguay on 8 October 2010.

== International goals ==
Ahmad Bustomi: International under-23 goals

Goal	Date	Venue	Opponent	Score	Result	Competition
1	16 May 2007	Lebak Bulus Stadium, Jakarta, Indonesia	Oman U23	2–1	2–1	2008 AFC Men's Pre-Olympic Tournament

== Honours ==
Arema

- Indonesia Super League: 2009–10
- East Java Governor Cup: 2013
- Indonesian Inter Island Cup: 2014/15
- Indonesia President's Cup: 2017
- Piala Indonesia runner-up: 2010

Indonesia

- AFF Championship runner-up: 2010
