= Persika Karanganyar =

Indonesian football club

- Full name: Persatuan Sepakbola Indonesia Karanganyar
- Nickname: Singo Lawu (Mount Lawu Lions)
- Founded: 1965; 61 years ago, as Persatuan Sepakbola Makam (PSM); 20 November 1967; 58 years ago, as Persika Karanganyar
- Ground: Angkatan 45 Stadium; Karanganyar, Central Java
- Capacity: 5,000
- Chairman: Rinto Subekti
- Coach: Ahmad Bustomi
- League: Liga Nusantara
- 2025–26: Liga Nusantara, Quarter-finals
| Home colours | Away colours |

Persatuan Sepakbola Indonesia Karanganyar, commonly known as Persika Karanganyar, is an Indonesian football club based in Karanganyar Regency, Central Java. They set to compete in Liga Nusantara from 2025–26, the third tier of Indonesian football after promotion from Liga 4.

== History ==
Persika Karanganyar was established in 1965, before changing its name to Persika Karanganyar, the club was originally named Persatuan Sepakbola Makam or PSM. There were two names who at that time led the Karanganyar Regency namely Daisman who led from February 1965 to August 1965 and Harun Al Rasyid led from September 1965 to October 1965.

The beginning of the founding of this club originated from a group of People Youth who were very fond of playing football at that time. Since there was no adequate football stadium, these youths played on a football field near the cemetery. Until finally they agreed to form a football association with the name PSM, the initial name was PSM, Persatuan Sepakbola Makam (lit. Cemetery Football Association).

In the era of Karanganyar Regent Leadership, R Soekardjono. PSM officially changed its name to Persika Karanganyar on 20 November 1967. Since it was officially founded, due to funding factors, the lack of funding has made this club not much involved in various football competitions in Indonesia. Until finally, in the 1980s, Persika Karanganyar managed to rise to the highest football caste in Indonesia. At that time, Persika Karanganyar qualified for the Perserikatan Division II.

On 14 May 2025, Persika secured promotion to Liga Nusantara for the first time in their history from next season after draw against Persebata Lembata 1–1 at Sultan Agung Stadium, Bantul in the Liga 4 national phase third round in Group B due to difference goal.

== Players ==
=== Current squad ===
As of October 2026

Note: Flags indicate national team as defined under FIFA eligibility rules; some limited exceptions apply. Players may hold more than one non-FIFA nationality.

| No. | Pos. | Nation | Player |
|---|---|---|---|
| 3 | DF | IDN | Ahmad Arrafi |
| 4 | MF | IDN | Abi Defa Marendra (captain) |
| 6 | DF | IDN | Revaldo Agusto |
| 7 | FW | IDN | Khalilla Kurniawan |
| 8 | MF | IDN | Yogiek Fernanda |
| 9 | FW | IDN | Wahyu Adi Utomo |
| 11 | FW | IDN | Muhammad Al-Farrel |
| 13 | MF | IDN | Werkudoro Al Maheswara |
| 19 | MF | IDN | Romadona Dwi Kusuma |
| 20 | DF | IDN | Genta Pramudiya |
| 22 | DF | IDN | Adhriansyah Francoies |
| 23 | DF | IDN | Safri Watinema |
| 24 | MF | IDN | Raihan Febriana |
| 25 | FW | IDN | Fajar Khusen |
| 26 | FW | IDN | Alsa Kiat |
| 28 | MF | IDN | Mohamad Iqbal |
| 33 | DF | IDN | A'an Aris |
| 66 | GK | IDN | Yudha Aditya |
| 71 | MF | IDN | Wahyu Hidayat |
| 77 | FW | IDN | Dewa Erlangga |
| 79 | DF | IDN | Muhammad Kifly |

| No. | Pos. | Nation | Player |
|---|---|---|---|
| 88 | MF | IDN | Tri Wibowo |
| — | GK | IDN | Arya Sheka |
| — | GK | IDN | Muhammad Faza |
| — | GK | IDN | Nuri Agus Wibowo |
| — | DF | IDN | Davin Armadheni |
| — | DF | IDN | Fadhilah Tegar |
| — | DF | IDN | Hasan Khotim Rifa'i |
| — | DF | IDN | Ifan Izdihar |
| — | DF | IDN | Ibnul Mubarak |
| — | DF | IDN | Lionel Zahra |
| — | DF | IDN | Musril |
| — | DF | IDN | Rio Saputro |
| — | DF | IDN | Yulfikar Mansur |
| — | MF | IDN | Arif Agung Musthofa |
| — | MF | IDN | Luqman Fadhil |
| — | MF | IDN | Mochamad Ragil |
| — | MF | IDN | Relosa Rivan |
| — | MF | IDN | Roni Sugeng |
| — | FW | IDN | Afdal Yusra |
| — | FW | IDN | Atletico Artha Gading |
| — | FW | IDN | Rexo Dolby |
| — | FW | IDN | Syaiful Asri |
| — | FW | IDN | Wawan Febrianto |

== Season-by-season records ==
| Season | League/Division | Tms. | Pos. | Piala Indonesia |
|---|---|---|---|---|
| 2006 | Second Division | 48 | 5th, Group IIB | – |
| 2007 | Second Division | 47 | 6th, Group IIB | – |
| 2008–09 | Second Division | 85 | First round | – |
| 2009–10 | Second Division | 81 | First round | – |
| 2010–11 | Second Division | 78 | 4th, Group 12 | – |
| 2012 | Second Division (LPIS) | 100 | 5th, Group 10 | – |
| 2013 | Second Division | 73 | Disqualified | – |
| 2014 | | | | |
2015
2016
2017
2018
2019
| 2020 | Liga 3 | season abandoned | | – |
| 2021–22 | Liga 3 | 64 | Eliminated in Provincial round | – |
| 2022–23 | Liga 3 | season abandoned | | – |
| 2023–24 | Liga 3 | 80 | Eliminated in Provincial round | – |
| 2024–25 | Liga 4 | 64 | 2 | – |
| 2025–26 | Liga Nusantara | 24 | Quarter-finalist | – |
| 2026–27 | Liga Nusantara | 24 | TBD | – |

== Honours ==
- Liga 4
  - Runner-up (1): 2024–25
- Liga 4 Central Java
  - Runner-up (1): 2024–25
