= Persiba Bantul =

Indonesian football club

- Full name: Persatuan Sepakbola Indonesia Bantul
- Nicknames: Laskar Sultan Agung (Sultan Agung Warriors); Gajah Jawa (Javan elephant)
- Founded: 21 September 1967; 59 years ago
- Ground: Sultan Agung Stadium
- Capacity: 35,000
- Owner: PT. Bantul Jaya Utama
- Chairman: Kuspindari Karinda Ragiel Perkasa
- Manager: Endro Bawono
- Coach: Andri Ramawi Putra
- League: Liga Nusantara
- 2025–26: Liga Nusantara, 4th
- Website: http://persiba.net/
Home colours	Away colours

Persatuan Sepak Bola Indonesia Bantul, commonly known as Persiba Bantul, is an Indonesian semi-professional football club based in Bantul, Yogyakarta. They currently compete in the Liga Nusantara.

== History ==
Persiba Bantul was established on 21 September 1967. 2004 marked a milestone in Persiba's history, after waiting for 37 years, they were promoted to the First Division. Drs. H.M. Idham Samawi plays a major role in this success, by helping them gaining financial support from the local government.

In 2005, PSSI loaned Persiba to use the Indonesia U-20 players in the First Division. In 2006, Persiba was forced to quit the 2006 First Division because of the 2006 Yogyakarta earthquake. They returned in 2007 and after almost got promoted in 2008–09 and 2009–10, they won the 2010–11 Liga Indonesia Premier Division by defeating Persiraja 1–0 and promoted to the Indonesia Super League. They also participated in the Indonesian Premier League.

They were relegated back to the Liga Indonesia Premier Division after finishing last place in the 2014 Indonesia Super League East group.

== Stadium ==
Persiba Bantul plays its home games at the Sultan Agung Stadium. The stadium has a capacity of 30,000.

== Supporters ==
Persiba's supporter group is called Paserbumi (Pasukan Suporter Bantul Militan).

== Players ==
=== Current squad ===
As of October 2026

Note: Flags indicate national team as defined under FIFA eligibility rules; some limited exceptions apply. Players may hold more than one non-FIFA nationality.

No.	Pos.	Nation	Player
3	DF	IDN	Rahmatullah
5	DF	IDN	Ilham Wibowo
7	FW	IDN	Sandi Samosir
8	FW	IDN	Kennatha Saputra
9	FW	IDN	Sansan Husaeni
13	GK	IDN	Tegar Aditya
14	GK	IDN	Saddam Bani
16	DF	IDN	Fachrizal Maulana (captain)
17	FW	IDN	Fillah Rohmatuloh
19	DF	IDN	Muhammad Haidir
21	MF	IDN	Dzakwan Mangawiang
23	MF	IDN	Femas Crespo
24	DF	IDN	Bima Ardiansyah

No.	Pos.	Nation	Player
26	FW	IDN	Alan Nuri
28	MF	IDN	Samudra Andi
30	MF	IDN	Ammar Attamimi
46	GK	IDN	Afit Prasojo
66	DF	IDN	Restu Agung
71	MF	IDN	Choirul Anwar
74	DF	IDN	Edgard Amping
96	MF	IDN	Akbar Selang
—	DF	IDN	Rian Ramadan
—	MF	IDN	Antoni Nugroho
—	MF	IDN	Syarif Wijianto
—	FW	IDN	Vengko Armedya

== Season by season records ==
Season	League/Division	Tms.	Pos.	Piala Indonesia
2004	Second Division	41	3rd, Third round	–
2005	First Division	30	7th, Group 2	First round
2006	First Division	36	8th, Group 3	First round
2007	First Division	40	2nd, Group 3	First round
2008–09	Premier Division	29	3rd, Second round	Third round
2009–10	Premier Division	33	3rd, Second round	First round
2010–11	Premier Division	39	1	–
2011–12	Indonesian Premier League	12	5	Quarter-finals
2013	Indonesian Premier League	16	2nd, Play-off round	–
2014	Indonesia Super League	22	11th, East Division	–
2015	Premier Division	55	did not finish	–
2016	Indonesia Soccer Championship B	53	5th, Group 5	–
2017	Liga 2	61	8th, Group 4	–
2018	Liga 3	32	4th, Third round	First round
2019	Liga 3	32	4th, First round	First round
2020	Liga 3	season abandoned		–
2021–22	Liga 3	64	Eliminated in Provincial round	–
2022–23	Liga 3	season abandoned		–
2023–24	Liga 3	80	3rd, Third round	–
2024–25	Liga Nusantara	16	1st, Relegation round	–
2025–26	Liga Nusantara	24	4	–
2026–27	Liga Nusantara	24	TBD	–

== Honours ==
=== League ===
- Liga Indonesia Premier Division
  - Champion (1): 2010–11
- Liga 3 Special Region of Yogyakarta
  - Champion (1): 2023

=== Cup ===
- Cilacap Regent's Cup
  - Champion (1): 2010
- Aceh Governor's Cup
  - Runner-up (1): 2011
- Batik Cup
  - Champion (1): 2012
- Magelang Cup
  - Champion (1): 2012

== See also ==
- List of football clubs in Indonesia
