= Persewar Waropen =

Association football team in Indonesia

- Full name: Persatuan Sepakbola Waropen
- Nicknames: The Mangrove Pearl; Papua Crabs
- Short name: WAR
- Founded: 1 May 2005; 21 years ago
- Ground: Mandala Stadium
- Capacity: 30,000
- Chairman: Yermias Bisai
- Head coach: Eduard Ivakdalam
- League: Liga 4
- 2025–26: Liga Nusantara, 6th of 6 (Group C) (withdrew and relegated)
Home colours	Away colours

Persatuan Sepakbola Waropen (commonly known as Persewar) is an Indonesian professional football club based in Waropen Regency, Papua, Indonesia. Persewar Waropen's nickname is Mutiara Bakau. They play their home matches at Mandala Stadium. In December 2018, they secured promotion to the Liga 2. The club will play in the Liga 4 next season, after they withdrew from the Liga Nusantara competition in the 2025/26 season.

== History ==
Persewar Waropen was established in 2005, from the year the club was founded until 2009, Persewar Waropen played in the Liga Indonesia Third Division. Persewar won the Liga Indonesia Third Division in the 2009–2010 season.

In the 2018 season, Persewar Waropen managed to get promoted to Liga 2 after being runner-up in the 2018 Liga 3 Papua zone and qualifying for the National Round of Liga 3. In the national round of Top 8 will be held at the Brawijaya Stadium. Persewar Waropen successfully finished third in the East Group and promoted to Liga 2 next season.

In the 2019 season, Persewar Waropen officially appointed former Indonesia national team player, Elie Aiboy as head coach of the club, previously he was assistant coach last season.

== Players ==
=== Current squad ===
As of 14 January 2025

Note: Flags indicate national team as defined under FIFA eligibility rules; some limited exceptions apply. Players may hold more than one non-FIFA nationality.

No.	Pos.	Nation	Player
1	GK	IDN	Samuel Mahuze
2	DF	IDN	Anthonius Kipin
4	DF	IDN	Fardiansyah
5	DF	IDN	Wenceslaus Fangohoy
6	DF	IDN	Julyan Onna
7	FW	IDN	Fredi Isir
9	FW	IDN	Melianus Maker
12	DF	IDN	Zulkifli Kosepa
14	MF	IDN	Alberto Yumawe
15	DF	IDN	Yusuf Marani
17	FW	IDN	Salvador Ayomi
19	FW	IDN	Rafiko Nawipa
21	FW	IDN	Devano Dwaramury
23	DF	IDN	Yanto Basna

No.	Pos.	Nation	Player
24	MF	IDN	Firman Syahbas
26	GK	IDN	Rangga Pratama
29	DF	IDN	Yohanis Tjoe (captain)
31	GK	IDN	Sheva Ananda
38	FW	IDN	Andi Kayoi
46	FW	IDN	Tobias Solossa
55	DF	IDN	Yulyan Tjoe
66	FW	IDN	Daud Kararbo
80	MF	IDN	Maikelgregorio Kowo
81	MF	IDN	Yesaya Kogoya
88	MF	IDN	Aurilie Lewerissa
90	DF	IDN	James Wanena
92	MF	IDN	Wellem Buinei
99	FW	IDN	Rivaldo Wally

== Coaching staff ==
Position	Name
Head coach	(Indonesia) Eduard Ivakdalam
Assistant coach	(Indonesia) Gerald Pangkali
Assistant coach	(Indonesia) Bahtiar Sitinjak
Fitness coach	(Indonesia) Agam Haris Prambudi
Goalkeeper coach	(Indonesia) Daniel Saroge

== Season-by-season records ==
Season	League/Division	Tms.	Pos.	Piala Indonesia	AFC competition(s)
2005	Third Division			–	–
2006	Third Division			–	–
2007–08	Third Division			–	–
2008–09	Third Division			–	–
2009–10	Third Division		1	–	–
2010–11	Second Division	62	2	–	–
2011–12	First Division (LPIS)	66	Second round	–	–
2013	First Division	77	Second round	–	–
2014	First Division	73	3rd, First round	–	–
2015	Liga Nusantara	season abandoned		–	–
2016	ISC Liga Nusantara	32	did not participate	–	–
2017	Liga 3	32	4th, First round	–	–
2018	Liga 3	32	3rd, Third round	Second round	–
2019	Liga 2	23	3rd, Second round	Second round	–
2020	Liga 2	24	did not finish	–	–
2021–22	Liga 2	24	3rd, Group D	–	–
2022–23	Liga 2	28	did not finish	–	–
2023–24	Liga 2	28	3rd, Championship round	–	–
2024–25	Liga 2	26	5th, Relegation round	–	–
2025–26	Liga Nusantara	24	Withdrew	–	–

== Honours ==
- Liga Indonesia Second Division
  - Runner-up (1): 2010–11
- Liga Indonesia Third Division
  - Champions (1): 2009–10
