= Persipa Pati =

Indonesian football club

- Full name: Persatuan Sepakbola Indonesia Pati
- Nicknames: Laskar Saridin (Saridin's Warriors); Kebo Landoh (The Landoh Buffalo)
- Short name: PPA; PSPA
- Founded: 19 April 1951; 75 years ago
- Ground: Joyokusumo Stadium; Pati, Central Java
- Capacity: 10,000
- Owner: PT Laskar Saridin Pati
- Chairman: Joni Kurnianto
- Manager: Dian Dwi Budianto
- Coach: Eduard Tjong
- League: Liga Nusantara
- 2025–26: Liga Nusantara/Regular Round (Group A), 4th
Home colours	Away colours	Third colours

Persatuan Sepakbola Indonesia Pati, commonly known as Persipa Pati or Persipa, is an Indonesian professional football club based in Pati, Central Java. The club plays in Liga Nusantara.

== History ==
Persipa Pati was established in the early days of independence in 1951, Laskar Saridin and Kebo Landoh were nicknames for them. Saridin is a figure who is known by the people of Pati. While the Kebo Landoh is Saridin's pet Buffalo which was said could not be penetrated by any weapon, their highest known honor is competing in the Liga Indonesia Premier Division. This is what Patifosi is longing for at the moment. In one match when Persipa was competing, a banner read "Bapak…!Rasane Divisi Utama Niku Pripun?" (Dad...! How does the Premier Division feels like?).

In the 2016 Liga Nusantara Central Java zone, Persipa Pati managed to advance to the semifinals, before finally being defeated by Persikaba Blora with a 1-0 aggregate at the Krisdosono Stadium.

On 2 November 2021, Persipa Pati made their 2021 Liga 3 Central Java match debut in a 0–0 draw against Persip Pekalongan at the Hoegeng Stadium, they actually played aggressively, and even tended to dominate the match led by referee Fero Arisanto from Kendal.

== Players ==
=== Current squad ===
As of November 2025

Note: Flags indicate national team as defined under FIFA eligibility rules; some limited exceptions apply. Players may hold more than one non-FIFA nationality.

No.	Pos.	Nation	Player
2	DF	IDN	Marcel Prasetyo
3	DF	IDN	Yudha Febrian
5	DF	IDN	Dwi Andhika Bawan
6	DF	IDN	Ardiansyah
8	MF	IDN	Yudha Risky Irawan
9	FW	IDN	Muhammad Saefullah
10	FW	IDN	Ade Kurniawan
11	FW	IDN	Fatkur Rohman Wahib
12	DF	IDN	Ikhfanul Alam (captain)
13	FW	IDN	Riza Fahlevy
14	DF	IDN	Zidan Ramadhan
15	DF	IDN	Syarif Rafa
16	FW	IDN	Andhika Reza Priyanto
17	FW	IDN	Munirul Anam
19	DF	IDN	Faqih Tahapary

No.	Pos.	Nation	Player
20	GK	IDN	Ferdian Gunawan
21	FW	IDN	Habib Rohman
22	DF	IDN	Dinar Safi
23	DF	IDN	Dava Sangga
24	FW	IDN	Akmil Syahrandi
27	FW	IDN	Farrel Arya
29	MF	IDN	Fajar Ananta Putra
30	MF	IDN	Gada Ramadhan
31	GK	IDN	Adhiel Tristanto
32	DF	IDN	Khoirul Huda
36	MF	IDN	Azura Permana
42	MF	IDN	Ahmed Syuhada
71	DF	IDN	Figo Firmansyah
78	FW	IDN	Damar Hasan
87	GK	IDN	Aminudin Noor

=== Out on loan ===
Note: Flags indicate national team as defined under FIFA eligibility rules; some limited exceptions apply. Players may hold more than one non-FIFA nationality.

No.	Pos.	Nation	Player
7	FW	IDN	Regzi Sanjaya (on loan to Persibangga Purbalingga)
99	MF	IDN	Alba Rizi (on loan to PSGJ Cirebon)

== Coaching staff ==
Position	Staff
Team manager	(Indonesia) Samuel Novianto
Technical director	(Indonesia) Nazal Mustofa
Head coach	(Indonesia) Eduard Tjong
Assistant coach	(Indonesia) Sasi Kirono
Goalkeeper coach	(Indonesia) Heri Susilo
Team doctor	(Indonesia) Dr. Ahmad Althof Malihul Adi

== Season-by-season records ==
Season	League/Division	Tms.	Pos.	Piala Indonesia
2008–09	Second Division	82	First round	–
2009–10	Second Division	81	Promoted	–
2010	First Division	57	4th, First round	–
2011–12	First Division	66	6th, First round	–
2013	First Division	77	4th, Second round	–
2014	First Division	73	5th, First round	–
2015				
2016
2017
2018	Liga 3	32	Eliminated in Provincial round	–
2019	Liga 3	32	Eliminated in Provincial round	
2020	Liga 3	season abandoned		–
2021–22	Liga 3	64	2nd, Third round	–
2022–23	Liga 2	28	did not finish	–
2023–24	Liga 2	28	2nd, Relegation round	–
2024–25	Liga 2	26	4th, Relegation round	–
2025–26	Liga Nusantara	24	4th, Group A	–
2026–27	Liga Nusantara	24	TBD	–

== Honours ==
- Liga 3 Central Java
  - Champion: 2021
