= Persikabo 1973 =

Association football team in Indonesia

- Full name: Persatuan Sepakbola Indonesia Kabupaten Bogor 1973
- Nicknames: Laskar Padjajaran (Pajajaran's Army)
- Short name: PBO
- Founded: 2004; 22 years ago, as Persiram Raja Ampat; 2015; 11 years ago, as PS TNI; 2018; 8 years ago, as PS TIRA; 2019; 7 years ago, as PS TIRA–Persikabo (merged with Persikabo Bogor); 2020; 6 years ago, as Persikabo 1973
- Ground: Pakansari Stadium
- Capacity: 30,000
- Owner: PT Cilangkap TNI Jaya
- President: Bimo Wirjasoekarta
- Manager: Gilang Ginarsa
- Coach: Vacant
- League: Liga 4
- 2025–26: Liga Nusantara, 6th of 6 (Group A) (withdrew and relegated)
Home colours	Away colours

Persatuan Sepakbola Indonesia Kabupaten Bogor 1973, commonly known as Persikabo 1973, is an Indonesian professional football club based in Bogor Regency, West Java, Indonesia. The club is set to compete in the Liga 4, the fourth tier of Indonesian football, after they withdrew from the Liga Nusantara in the 2025–26 season.

== History ==
This club started from an initiative to participate in the 2015 Piala Jenderal Sudirman tournament with a team that incorporated players from the professional PSMS Medan club into the Indonesian National Armed Forces (TNI)'s amateur club, PS TNI. After this tournament, PS TNI parted ways with PSMS Medan but decided to become a professional club that combines soldiers with professional players. In March 2016, PS TNI appointed their first professional coach, Englishman Judan Ali and acquired Persiram Raja Ampat, a cash-strapped first-tier team from the impoverished West Papua province, for a cost of 17 billion rupiah.

For the 2018 Liga 1 season, PS TNI were renamed as PS TIRA to dilute the TNI association and moved to Bantul. The team finished 2018 Liga 1 in 15th position and escaped relegation after securing a vital 3–1 win against Borneo in the last match of the season. PS TIRA later merged with Liga 3 club Persikabo Bogor in early 2019 to form PS TIRA-Persikabo and play at Pakansari Stadium in Bogor Regency.

Ahead of the 2020 Liga 1 season, PS TIRA-Persikabo changed its name to Persikabo 1973. But they used the name TIRA-Persikabo and the same logo for the 2020 Liga 1 season because these changes were not approved by the Football Association of Indonesia (PSSI). During its May 2021 annual congress, PSSI said the club cancelled the plan to propose for a name change. But they used the name Persikabo 1973 as a commercial arrangement for the 2021–22 Liga 1 season.

In the 2023–24 Liga 1 season, Persikabo were relegated to the Liga 2, with 4 matches left to spare, ending their seven-years tenure in the top division.

In the 2024–25 Liga 2 season, Persikabo were relegated to Liga Nusantara after finishing at the bottom of the Relegation Round, lasted only one-year tenure in the second division. This also marks back-to-back relegations for Persikabo, following their relegation from the 2023–24 Liga 1 at the previous season.

Persikabo withdrew before the 2025–26 Liga Nusantara season and were relegated to Liga 4.

== Season to season record ==
Season	League									Indonesian Cup	Continental competition	Team topscorer
Season	Comp.	App.	W	D	L	GF	GA	Point	Pos.	Indonesian Cup	Continental competition	Team topscorer
2016	ISC A	34	7	5	22	37	75	26	18th	Not held	Not participating	Unknown
2017	Liga 1	34	12	6	16	46	58	42	12th	Not held	Not participating	(Portugal) Élio Martins (11)
2018	Liga 1	34	12	6	16	48	57	42	15th	Round of 16	Not participating	(Serbia) Aleksandar Rakić (21)
2019	Liga 1	34	10	12	12	51	57	42	15th	Not held	Not participating	(Brazil) Ciro Alves (14)
2020	Liga 1	Competition suspended due to pandemic COVID-19										
2021–22	Liga 1	34	10	10	14	49	48	40	10th	Not held	Not participating	(Brazil) Ciro Alves (20)
2022–23	Liga 1	34	11	8	15	43	48	41	14th	Not held	Not participating	(Timor-Leste) Pedro Henrique (9)
2023–24	Liga 1	34	4	8	22	44	70	20	18th	Not held	Not participating	(Indonesia) Yandi Sofyan (9)
2024–25	Liga 2	22	1	3	18	23	64	6	4th (Note: Group I in Relegation round)	Not held	Not participating	(Islamic Republic of Afghanistan) Fareed Sadat (6) (Note: in winter transfer, moved to PSKC Cimahi)
2025–26	Liga Nusantara	Withdrew from the competition										

Champion	Runner-up	Promotion	Relegation

== Stadium ==
When competing in 2016 Indonesian Soccer Championship as PS TNI, the club played at Siliwangi Stadium in Bandung. For the 2017 Liga 1 season, they moved to Pakansari Stadium, and moved again to Sultan Agung Stadium in Bantul for the 2018 season. As the result of their merger with Persikabo Bogor, the club in 2019 returned to Pakansari to play their home matches.

== Supporters ==
Persikabo has a supporter group's in Bogor Regency and spread across the Greater Jakarta area, they have become one of the representatives of a football club in West Java with a Sundanese identity. Kabomania is the name for the club's supporters who are all over the stands. There are other, more exclusive supporter groups, Ultras Persikabo Curva Sud is a group that only fills in the south stand at the Pakansari Stadium.

== Rivalries ==
=== Persija–Persikabo rivalry ===
Rivalry with Persija Jakarta, also known as Jakarta–Bogor rivalry, has been going on from their supporters since 2008 and has become a new rival for clubs with adjacent locations.

=== Pasundan derby ===
The match with Persib Bandung, also known as Pasundan derby or West Java derby, is a match in West Java.

== Players ==
=== Current squad ===
As of March 2025

Note: Flags indicate national team as defined under FIFA eligibility rules; some limited exceptions apply. Players may hold more than one non-FIFA nationality.

No.	Pos.	Nation	Player
4	DF	IDN	Ahmad Wahyudi
6	DF	IDN	Syukran Arabia
9	FW	IDN	Irman Toberru
12	FW	IDN	Abdullatif Adi
14	FW	IDN	Fillah Rohmatuloh
17	DF	IDN	Abdul Rahman (captain)
20	GK	IDN	Farel Putra
21	DF	IDN	Dwiyanto Susilo
22	GK	IDN	Zahid Amel
24	MF	IDN	Dalmiansyah Matutu
25	DF	IDN	Fadhil Aksah
28	DF	IDN	Brama Siwi
29	MF	IDN	Dhaffa Putra
30	MF	IDN	Isfandyar Abdillah

No.	Pos.	Nation	Player
37	FW	IDN	Bagas Umar
38	GK	IDN	Zul Azhar
44	DF	IDN	Nursyam
45	MF	IDN	Ridho Surya
47	DF	IDN	Muhammad Fikram
57	GK	IDN	Junaidi Bakhtiar
67	MF	IDN	Akbar Hermawan
71	DF	IDN	Wahyu Saputro
74	MF	IDN	Apriyanto Nurdin
75	MF	IDN	Nugroho Fatchur Rochman
77	FW	IDN	Delan Selang
78	MF	IDN	Yogi Novrian
83	DF	IDN	Basroh Alamsah
87	DF	IDN	Ahmad Rifal
96	MF	IDN	Al Wino Zacqy

=== Staff ===
Position	Name
Manager	Vacant
Assistant Manager	Vacant
Technical Director	Vacant
Head Coach	Vacant
Assistant Coach	(Indonesia) Fahmi Amiruddin
Assistant Coach	Vacant
Physical Coach	Vacant
Goalkeeper Coach	(Indonesia) Nanang Hidayat
Assistant Goalkeeper Coach	Vacant
Team Doctor	(Indonesia) Ihsan Muhammad
Team Doctor	(Indonesia) Renol Rahman
Team Physiotherapist	(Indonesia) Irfan Surya Nugroho
Team Physiotherapist	(Indonesia) Muhammad Sidik
Masseur	(Indonesia) Indar Istiqnan
Kit & equipment manager	(Indonesia) Agus Solihin
Kit & Equipment Assistant	(Indonesia) Randi Ompong
Head of Media Officer	(Indonesia) Nandang Permana Sidik
Media Officer Assistant	(Indonesia) Nandang Rusmawan

== Coaches ==
Name	Nat.	Season
Suharto A.D.	(Indonesia)	2015
Judan Ali	(England)	2016
Eduard Tjong	(Indonesia)	2016
Suharto A.D.	(Indonesia)	2016
Laurent Hatton	(France)	2017
Ivan Kolev	(Bulgaria)	2017
Rudy Eka Priyambada	(Indonesia)	2018
Nil Maizar	(Indonesia)	2018
Rahmad Darmawan	(Indonesia)	2019
Igor Kriushenko	(Belarus)	2019–2021
Liestiadi	(Indonesia)	2021–2022
Djadjang Nurdjaman	(Indonesia)	2022–2023
Aidil Sharin Sahak	(Singapore)	2023
Aji Santoso	(Indonesia)	2023–2024
Djadjang Nurdjaman	(Indonesia)	2024–
