= 2019 Liga 3 Regional Round =

Football competition round

The 2019 Liga 3 Regional Round was played from 18 November to 5 December 2019. A total of 81 teams competed in the regional round to decide 26 of the 32 places in the national round of the 2019 Liga 3.

== Teams ==
The following 81 teams entered the regional winner route divided into seven regions:

**Sumatra Region**
Province	Teams
Aceh	**Persidi**
Aceh	PSBL
Aceh	Galacticos
Aceh	PS Peureulak Raya
Aceh	PSLS
Aceh	PSGL
North Sumatra	**Karo United**
North Sumatra	PS Bhinneka
Riau	**Tornado**
Riau	PS Siak
Riau	Kuansing United
Riau	Dumai
Riau Islands	**757 Kepri Jaya**
West Sumatra	**PSP**
West Sumatra	Batang Anai
Jambi	**Persibri**
Bengkulu	Bengkulu Raya (Note: Bengkulu Raya was chosen to represent Bengkulu instead of Persipa Bengkulu, the winner of 2019 Liga 3 Bengkulu.)
(Bangka Belitung Islands) Bangka Belitung	**Persibabar**
South Sumatra	**Muba United**
Lampung	**AD Sport**

**Kalimantan Region**
Province	Teams
West Kalimantan	**Persikat**
Central Kalimantan	**PSMTW**
South Kalimantan	**Persetala**
South Kalimantan	Kotabaru
East Kalimantan	**Bontang City**
East Kalimantan	Harbi Pusam
North Kalimantan	**PS Tarakan Banten Jaya**

**Java Region**
Province	Teams
Banten	**Persikota**
Banten	Serang Jaya
Banten	Persitangsel
Jakarta	**Jakarta United**
Jakarta	PS Pemuda Jaya
Jakarta	PRO-Direct
Jakarta	Villa 2000 B
West Java	**PSKC**
West Java	Persikasi
West Java	Persitas
West Java	Perses
West Java	Benpica
West Java	Persikab
West Java	PSGJ
West Java	Patriot Candrabhaga
Central Java	**Persiku**
Central Java	Persekat
Central Java	Persebi
Central Java	Persibas
Central Java	PSIP
Central Java	Persab
(Special Region of Yogyakarta) Yogyakarta	**Sleman United**
(Special Region of Yogyakarta) Yogyakarta	PS Protaba
East Java	**Putra Sinar Giri**
East Java	Perseta
East Java	Persekabpas
East Java	PSID
East Java	Persedikab
East Java	Persewangi
East Java	Persekap
East Java	PSIL
East Java	Persesa
East Java	Sumbersari
East Java	Putra Jombang
East Java	PS KoPa

**Lesser Sunda Islands Region**
Province	Teams
Bali	**Perseden**
West Nusa Tenggara	**Persebi Bima**
West Nusa Tenggara	Perslobar
East Nusa Tenggara	**PS Malaka**

**Sulawesi Region**
Province	Teams
Gorontalo	**Persidago**
North Sulawesi	**Persma 1960**
North Sulawesi	Persmin
North Sulawesi	Tahuna
Central Sulawesi	**Pestu**
West Sulawesi	PS Matra (Note: PS Matra was chosen to represent West Sulawesi instead of PS Polmas, the winner of 2019 Liga 3 West Sulawesi.)
Southeast Sulawesi	**PS Wonua Bombana**
Southeast Sulawesi	PS Gulamastar
South Sulawesi	**Perspin**
South Sulawesi	Gaspa 1958
South Sulawesi	PS Nene Mallomo

**Maluku Region**
Province	Teams
(Maluku (province)) Maluku	**PS Hatusela Mamala**
North Maluku	**Persiter**

**Papua Region**
Province	Teams
(West Papua (province)) West Papua	**Kaimana**
(Papua (province)) Papua	**Persemi**

Notes:

- BOLD: Winner of each provincial league.

== Regional round ==
=== Sumatra ===
A total of 20 teams played in Sumatra regional round. Six best teams from this region advanced to national round. This region was played from 19 November – 5 December 2019.

First round
Team 1	Agg.	Team 2	1st leg	2nd leg
N/A	Bye	(Aceh) Persidi	—	—
PS Bhinneka (North Sumatra)	2–3	(Aceh) Galacticos	1–0	1–3
PS Peureulak Raya (Aceh)	2–6	(Aceh) PSBL	1–2	1–4
PS Siak (Riau)	w/o (Note: PSGL withdrew from competition before the start of the 1st leg. As a result, PS Siak qualified for the next round.)	(Aceh) PSGL	—	—
Kuansing United (Riau)	1–4	(Aceh) PSLS	1–1	0–3 (w/o)
Karo United (North Sumatra)	Bye	N/A	—	—
N/A	Bye	(Riau) Tornado	—	—
Dumai (Riau)	w/o (Note: Dumai withdrew from competition before the start of the 1st leg. As a result, Persibabar qualified for the next round.)	(Bangka Belitung Islands) Persibabar	—	—
Persibri (Jambi)	3–2	Bengkulu Raya	2–2	1–0
AD Sport (Lampung)	2–4	(West Sumatra) Batang Anai	0–1	2–3
Muba United (South Sumatra)	1–2	(Riau Islands) 757 Kepri Jaya	1–0	0–2
PSP (West Sumatra)	Bye	N/A	—	—

Second round
Team 1	Agg.	Team 2	1st leg	2nd leg
Persidi (Aceh)	3–1	(Aceh) Galacticos	1–0	2–1
PSBL (Aceh)	8–3	(Riau) PS Siak	3–1	5–2
PSLS (Aceh)	2–3	(North Sumatra) Karo United	1–0	1–3
Tornado (Riau)	3–1	(Bangka Belitung Islands) Persibabar	2–1	1–0
Persibri (Jambi)	6–6 (a)	(West Sumatra) Batang Anai	4–1	2–5
757 Kepri Jaya (Riau Islands)	5–2	(West Sumatra) PSP	4–0	1–2

=== Java ===
A total of 35 teams played in Java regional round. Twelve best teams from this region advanced to national round. This region was played from 18 November – 3 December 2019.

First round
Team 1	Agg.	Team 2	1st leg	2nd leg
N/A	Bye	(Banten) Persikota	—	—
Sumbersari (East Java)	2–4	(Banten) Serang Jaya	2–1	0–3
N/A	Bye	(West Java) Persikasi	—	—
Putra Jombang (East Java)	0–3	(Central Java) Persibas	0–0	0–3
N/A	Bye	(Central Java) Persebi	—	—
Persekat (Central Java)	Bye	N/A	—	—
N/A	Bye	(West Java) PSKC	—	—
Patriot Candrabhaga (West Java)	2–0	(West Java) Benpica	2–0	0–0
N/A	Bye	(East Java) Perseta	—	—
Persesa (East Java)	1–3	(Jakarta) PRO-Direct	0–0	1–3
N/A	Bye	(West Java) Persitas	—	—
Persewangi (East Java)	4–2	(West Java) Perses	3–1	1–1
N/A	Bye	(Special Region of Yogyakarta) Sleman United	—	—
Persekap (East Java)	5–4	(Central Java) PSIP	5–2	0–2
N/A	Bye	Jakarta United	—	—
PSIL (East Java)	8–0	(Jakarta) Villa 2000 B	4–0	4–0
N/A	Bye	(East Java) Putra Sinar Giri	—	—
Persikab (West Java)	0–3	(Banten) Persitangsel	0–1	0–2
N/A	Bye	(Central Java) Persiku	—	—
PS KoPa (East Java)	2–6	(East Java) Persedikab	1–4	1–2
N/A	Bye	(East Java) Persekabpas	—	—
PSGJ (West Java)	1–6	(East Java) PSID	0–3 (w/o)	1–3
N/A	Bye	(Jakarta) PS Pemuda Jaya	—	—
Persab (Central Java)	w/o (Note: Persab withdrew from competition before the start of the 1st leg. As a result, PS Protaba qualified for the next round.)	(Special Region of Yogyakarta) PS Protaba	—	—

Second round
Team 1	Agg.	Team 2	1st leg	2nd leg
Persikota (Banten)	5–1	(Banten) Serang Jaya	5–0	0–1
Persikasi (West Java)	2–3	(Central Java) Persibas	2–0	0–3
Persebi (Central Java)	2–2 (3–5 p)	(Central Java) Persekat	1–1	1–1 (a.e.t.)
PSKC (West Java)	4–2	(West Java) Patriot Candrabhaga	3–0	1–2
Perseta (East Java)	5–0	(Jakarta) PRO-Direct	2–0	3–0
Persitas (West Java)	2–1	(East Java) Persewangi	1–0	1–1
Sleman United (Special Region of Yogyakarta)	4–1	(East Java) Persekap	2–1	2–0
Jakarta United	0–13	(East Java) PSIL	0–6	0–7
Putra Sinar Giri (East Java)	12–0	(Banten) Persitangsel	5–0	7–0
Persiku (Central Java)	3–4	(East Java) Persedikab	2–1	1–3
Persekabpas (East Java)	3–3 (a)	(East Java) PSID	2–2	1–1
PS Pemuda Jaya (Jakarta)	3–5	(Special Region of Yogyakarta) PS Protaba	1–2	2–3

=== Kalimantan ===
A total of seven teams played in Kalimantan regional round. Two best teams from this region advanced to national round. This region was played from 18 November – 2 December 2019.

First round
Team 1	Agg.	Team 2	1st leg	2nd leg
N/A	Bye	(East Kalimantan) Bontang City	—	—
Persikat (West Kalimantan)	2–1	(South Kalimantan) Kotabaru	1–1	1–0
PSMTW (Central Kalimantan)	2–2 (a)	(North Kalimantan) PS Tarakan Banten Jaya	2–1	0–1
Persetala (South Kalimantan)	4–0	(East Kalimantan) Harbi Pusam	2–0	2–0

Second round
Team 1	Agg.	Team 2	1st leg	2nd leg
Bontang City (East Kalimantan)	2–1	(West Kalimantan) Persikat	2–1	0–0
PS Tarakan Banten Jaya (North Kalimantan)	1–0	(South Kalimantan) Persetala	1–0	0–0

=== Sulawesi ===
A total of 11 teams played in Sulawesi regional round. Three best teams from this region advanced to national round. This region was played from 18 November – 2 December 2019.

First round
Team 1	Agg.	Team 2	1st leg	2nd leg
N/A	Bye	(North Sulawesi) Persma 1960	—	—
Persmin (North Sulawesi)	2–5	(Gorontalo) Persidago	1–1	1–4
Tahuna (North Sulawesi)	3–4	(South Sulawesi) PS Nene Mallomo	2–1	1–3
Gaspa 1958 (South Sulawesi)	6–3	(Southeast Sulawesi) PS Wonua Bombana	1–2	5–1
Perspin (South Sulawesi)	1–2	(Central Sulawesi) Pestu	1–0	0–2
PS Matra (West Sulawesi)	w/o (Note: PS Gulamastar withdrew from competition before the start of the 1st leg. As a result, PS Matra qualified for the next round.)	(Southeast Sulawesi) PS Gulamastar	—	—

Second round
Team 1	Agg.	Team 2	1st leg	2nd leg
Persma 1960 (North Sulawesi)	0–6	(Gorontalo) Persidago	0–3 (w/o)	0–3 (w/o)
PS Nene Mallomo (South Sulawesi)	2–4	(South Sulawesi) Gaspa 1958	1–2	1–2
Pestu (Central Sulawesi)	2–3	(West Sulawesi) PS Matra	2–1	0–2

=== Lesser Sunda Islands ===
A total of four teams played in Lesser Sunda Islands regional round. The best teams from this region advanced to national round. This region was played from 18 November – 2 December 2019.

First round
Team 1	Agg.	Team 2	1st leg	2nd leg
Persebi Bima (West Nusa Tenggara)	5–5 (a)	(East Nusa Tenggara) PS Malaka	3–1	2–4
Perslobar (West Nusa Tenggara)	2–4	(Bali) Perseden	1–2	1–2

Second round
Team 1	Agg.	Team 2	1st leg	2nd leg
Persebi Bima (West Nusa Tenggara)	1–2	(Bali) Perseden	1–1	0–1

=== Maluku ===
A total of two teams played in Maluku regional round. The best teams from this region advanced to national round. This region was played from 21 to 30 November 2019.

Team 1	Agg.	Team 2	1st leg	2nd leg
PS Hatusela Mamala (Maluku (province))	3–4	(North Maluku) Persiter	1–1	2–3

=== Papua ===
A total of two teams played in Papua regional round. The best teams from this region advanced to national round. This region was played from 22 November – 1 December 2019.

Team 1	Agg.	Team 2	1st leg	2nd leg
Persemi (Papua (province))	5–3	(West Papua (province)) Kaimana	3–3	2–0

== Qualified teams ==
The following teams qualified from regional route for the national round.

Qualified teams	Province	Qualified on
Persiter	North Maluku	30 November 2019
Persemi	Papua	1 December 2019
Persidago	Gorontalo	2 December 2019
Perseden	Bali	2 December 2019
Bontang City	East Kalimantan	2 December 2019
Gaspa 1958	South Sulawesi	2 December 2019
Persibas	Central Java	2 December 2019
Sleman United	Special Region of Yogyakarta	2 December 2019
PS Tarakan Banten Jaya	North Kalimantan	2 December 2019
Putra Sinar Giri	East Java	2 December 2019
PS Matra	West Sulawesi	2 December 2019
Persekat	Central Java	2 December 2019
Persikota	Banten	2 December 2019
Persedikab	East Java	3 December 2019
Persitas	West Java	3 December 2019
PSIL	East Java	3 December 2019
PSID	East Java	3 December 2019
PSKC	West Java	3 December 2019
Perseta	East Java	3 December 2019
PS Protaba	Special Region of Yogyakarta	3 December 2019
PSBL	Aceh	4 December 2019
Karo United	North Sumatra	4 December 2019
Persidi	Aceh	4 December 2019
Tornado	Riau	5 December 2019
757 Kepri Jaya	Riau Islands	5 December 2019
Persibri	Jambi	5 December 2019
