= 2019 Liga 3 (Indonesia) =

Third season of the Liga 3 in Indonesia

Liga 3
- Season: 2019
- Dates: Qualifying: 5 July – 5 December 2019; National round: 12–29 December 2019
- Champions: Persijap (1st title)
- Promoted: Persijap; PSKC; Tiga Naga; Persekat; Putra Sinar Giri; Semeru
- Matches: 69
- Goals: 195 (2.83 per match)
- Best player: Rizki Hidayat (Persijap)
- Top goalscorer: Rikza Syawali (9 goals)
- Highest scoring: PSKC 7–2 Persitas (16 December 2019)

The 2019 Liga 3 was the third season of the Liga 3 under its current name, the fourth season under its current league structure, and the only amateur league football competition in Indonesia.

Persijap defeated PSKC 3–1 in the final at the Pakansari Stadium to win their first Liga 3 title.

== Teams ==
=== Team changes ===
The following teams changed division from the 2018 season.

==== To Liga 3 ====
Relegated from Liga 2

- Gresik United
- Persik Kendal
- Persika
- Persiwa
- PSIR
- Semeru

==== From Liga 3 ====
Promoted to Liga 2

- Persatu
- Persewar
- Persik
- PSCS
- PSGC
- Sulut United (formerly Bogor)

== Overview ==
=== Player regulations ===
Unlike previous seasons, teams are not allowed to use senior players. Players born on or after 1 January 1997 are eligible to compete in this league.

== Qualifying round ==
Qualifying round for national round is divided into 2 routes:

- Regional route (consist of representatives from 34 provinces). First, each province held their provincial league followed by unlimited amateur teams with different competition format. Then qualified teams from provincial league are competing in their respective region to earn 26 slots in national round.
- Pre-national route is featured by six relegated teams from 2018 Liga 2 and 10 teams that qualified for the second round last season. Six teams will be qualified for national round from this route.

=== Regional route ===
==== Province round ====
These teams are the representatives from their provincial league to be competing in regional round.

**Sumatra Region**
Province	Teams
Aceh	**Persidi**
Aceh	PSBL
Aceh	Galacticos
Aceh	PS Peureulak Raya
Aceh	PSLS
Aceh	PSGL
North Sumatra	**Karo United**
North Sumatra	PS Bhinneka
Riau	**Tornado**
Riau	PS Siak
Riau	Kuansing United
Riau	Dumai
Riau Islands	**757 Kepri Jaya**
West Sumatra	**PSP**
West Sumatra	Batang Anai
Jambi	**Persibri**
Bengkulu	Bengkulu Raya (Note: Bengkulu Raya was chosen to represent Bengkulu instead of Persipa Bengkulu, the winner of 2019 Liga 3 Bengkulu.)
(Bangka Belitung Islands) Bangka Belitung	**Persibabar**
South Sumatra	**Muba United**
Lampung	**AD Sport**

**Kalimantan Region**
Province	Teams
West Kalimantan	**Persikat**
Central Kalimantan	**PSMTW**
South Kalimantan	**Persetala**
South Kalimantan	Kotabaru
East Kalimantan	**Bontang City**
East Kalimantan	Harbi Pusam
North Kalimantan	**PS Tarakan Banten Jaya**

**Java Region**
Province	Teams
Banten	**Persikota**
Banten	Serang Jaya
Banten	Persitangsel
Jakarta	**Jakarta United**
Jakarta	PS Pemuda Jaya
Jakarta	PRO-Direct
Jakarta	Villa 2000 B
West Java	**PSKC**
West Java	Persikasi
West Java	Persitas
West Java	Perses
West Java	Benpica
West Java	Persikab
West Java	PSGJ
West Java	Patriot Candrabhaga
Central Java	**Persiku**
Central Java	Persekat
Central Java	Persebi
Central Java	Persibas
Central Java	PSIP
Central Java	Persab
(Special Region of Yogyakarta) Yogyakarta	**Sleman United**
(Special Region of Yogyakarta) Yogyakarta	PS Protaba
East Java	**Putra Sinar Giri**
East Java	Perseta
East Java	Persekabpas
East Java	PSID
East Java	Persedikab
East Java	Persewangi
East Java	Persekap
East Java	PSIL
East Java	Persesa
East Java	Sumbersari
East Java	Putra Jombang
East Java	PS KoPa

**Lesser Sunda Islands Region**
Province	Teams
Bali	**Perseden**
West Nusa Tenggara	**Persebi Bima**
West Nusa Tenggara	Perslobar
East Nusa Tenggara	**PS Malaka**

**Sulawesi Region**
Province	Teams
Gorontalo	**Persidago**
North Sulawesi	**Persma 1960**
North Sulawesi	Persmin
North Sulawesi	Tahuna
Central Sulawesi	**Pestu**
West Sulawesi	PS Matra (Note: PS Matra was chosen to represent West Sulawesi instead of PS Polmas, the winner of 2019 Liga 3 West Sulawesi.)
Southeast Sulawesi	**PS Wonua Bombana**
Southeast Sulawesi	PS Gulamastar
South Sulawesi	**Perspin**
South Sulawesi	Gaspa 1958
South Sulawesi	PS Nene Mallomo

**Maluku Region**
Province	Teams
(Maluku (province)) Maluku	**PS Hatusela Mamala**
North Maluku	**Persiter**

**Papua Region**
Province	Teams
(West Papua (province)) West Papua	**Kaimana**
(Papua (province)) Papua	**Persemi**

Notes:

- BOLD: Winner of each provincial league.

==== Regional round ====
The following teams qualified from regional route for the national round.

Qualified teams	Province	Qualified on
Persiter	North Maluku	30 November 2019
Persemi	Papua	1 December 2019
Persidago	Gorontalo	2 December 2019
Perseden	Bali	2 December 2019
Bontang City	East Kalimantan	2 December 2019
Gaspa 1958	South Sulawesi	2 December 2019
Persibas	Central Java	2 December 2019
Sleman United	Special Region of Yogyakarta	2 December 2019
PS Tarakan Banten Jaya	North Kalimantan	2 December 2019
Putra Sinar Giri	East Java	2 December 2019
PS Matra	West Sulawesi	2 December 2019
Persekat	Central Java	2 December 2019
Persikota	Banten	2 December 2019
Persedikab	East Java	3 December 2019
Persitas	West Java	3 December 2019
PSIL	East Java	3 December 2019
PSID	East Java	3 December 2019
PSKC	West Java	3 December 2019
Perseta	East Java	3 December 2019
PS Protaba	Special Region of Yogyakarta	3 December 2019
PSBL	Aceh	4 December 2019
Karo United	North Sumatra	4 December 2019
Persidi	Aceh	4 December 2019
Tornado	Riau	5 December 2019
757 Kepri Jaya	Riau Islands	5 December 2019
Persibri	Jambi	5 December 2019

=== Pre-national route ===
The following 15 teams entered the pre-national round:

- Celebest
- Gresik United
- Persiba Bantul
- Persijap
- Persik Kendal
- Persika
- Persinga
- Perssu 1977
- PSBK
- PSN
- Semeru
- SEL 50 Kota
- Tiga Naga (replace AS Abadi)

There should be six teams relegated from 2018 Liga 2 that competed in this route, but Persiwa disqualified by PSSI. And also supposedly AS Abadi competed as one of 10 teams that qualified for the second round last season. But they replaced by Tiga Naga. Later, Lampung Sakti and PSIR withdrew from the competition. In October, Solok merged with Equator Luak 50 Kota into SEL 50 Kota and relocated from Solok to Lima Puluh Kota. The following teams qualified from pre-national route for the national round.

Qualified teams	Qualified as	Qualified on
Tiga Naga	Group A winner	10 November 2019
Persijap	Group B winner	16 November 2019
PSN	Group C runners-up	22 November 2019
Semeru	Group C winner	26 November 2019
Persinga	Group B runners-up	26 November 2019
Persiba Bantul	Group A runners-up	26 November 2019

== National round ==
A total of 32 teams will be competing in this round.

=== First round ===
In this first round, 32 teams divided into eight groups (4 groups in West region and 4 groups in East region). Each group played a home tournament basis. First round was played from 12–16 December 2019. Winner and runner-up of each group advanced to the second round.

==== West region ====
===== Group A =====
- Tiga Naga hosted this group at Tumpal Sinaga Stadium and Kaharudin Nasution Stadium, Pekanbaru.

Pos	Team	Pld	W	D	L	GF	GA	GD	Pts	Qualification
1	Tiga Naga (H)	3	1	2	0	4	2	+2	5 (Note: Head-to-head result: Tiga Naga 0–0 Karo United.)	Advanced to the second round
2	Karo United	3	1	2	0	2	1	+1	5	Advanced to the second round
3	Persikota	3	0	2	1	3	4	−1	2 (Note: Head-to-head result: Persikota 1–1 Tornado.)	
4	Tornado	3	0	2	1	2	4	−2	2	

Source: PSSI
(H) Hosts
Notes:

12 December 2019
Tiga Naga	0–0	Karo United	Tumpal Sinaga Stadium, Pekanbaru
Persikota	1–1	Tornado	Tumpal Sinaga Stadium, Pekanbaru
14 December 2019
Karo United	2–1	Persikota	Tumpal Sinaga Stadium, Pekanbaru
Tornado	1–3	Tiga Naga	Tumpal Sinaga Stadium, Pekanbaru
16 December 2019
Tiga Naga	1–1	Persikota	Tumpal Sinaga Stadium, Pekanbaru
Karo United	0–0	Tornado	Kaharudin Nasution Stadium, Pekanbaru

===== Group B =====
- PSSI chose to hold this group at Haji Agus Salim Stadium and BBC Batuang Taba Stadium, Padang.

Pos	Team	Pld	W	D	L	GF	GA	GD	Pts	Qualification
1	Persidi	3	2	1	0	5	0	+5	7	Advanced to the second round
2	757 Kepri Jaya	3	1	1	1	6	5	+1	4	Advanced to the second round
3	PSBL	3	0	2	1	4	7	−3	2 (Note: Head-to-head result: PSBL 1–1 Persibri)	
4	Persibri	3	0	2	1	1	4	−3	2	

Source: PSSI
Notes:

12 December 2019
Persidi	2–0	757 Kepri Jaya	Haji Agus Salim Stadium, Padang
PSBL	1–1	Persibri	Haji Agus Salim Stadium, Padang
14 December 2019
757 Kepri Jaya	3–3	PSBL	Haji Agus Salim Stadium, Padang
Persibri	0–0	Persidi	Haji Agus Salim Stadium, Padang
16 December 2019
Persidi	3–0	PSBL	Haji Agus Salim Stadium, Padang
757 Kepri Jaya	3–0	Persibri	BBC Batuang Taba Stadium, Padang

===== Group C =====
- PSKC hosted this group at Siliwangi Stadium, Bandung and Jalak Harupat Stadium, Bandung Regency.

Pos	Team	Pld	W	D	L	GF	GA	GD	Pts	Qualification
1	Persekat	3	2	0	1	5	2	+3	6 (Note: Head-to-head points: Persekat (+1) 3 pts; PSKC (+0) 3 pts; Persibas (–1) 3 pts.)	Advanced to the second round
2	PSKC (H)	3	2	0	1	9	4	+5	6	Advanced to the second round
3	Persibas	3	2	0	1	2	2	0	6	
4	Persitas	3	0	0	3	2	10	−8	0	

Source: PSSI
(H) Hosts
Notes:

12 December 2019
PSKC	2–1	Persekat	Siliwangi Stadium, Bandung
Persitas	0–1	Persibas	Siliwangi Stadium, Bandung
14 December 2019
Persekat	2–0	Persitas	Siliwangi Stadium, Bandung
15 December 2019
Persibas	1–0	PSKC	Siliwangi Stadium, Bandung
16 December 2019
PSKC	7–2	Persitas	Siliwangi Stadium, Bandung
Persekat	2–0	Persibas	Jalak Harupat Stadium, Bandung Regency

===== Group D =====
- Persiba Bantul hosted this group at Sultan Agung Stadium and Dwi Windu Stadium, Bantul.

Pos	Team	Pld	W	D	L	GF	GA	GD	Pts	Qualification
1	Persinga	3	2	1	0	4	1	+3	7	Advanced to the second round
2	Sleman United	3	2	0	1	6	4	+2	6	Advanced to the second round
3	PS Protaba	3	0	2	1	1	4	−3	2	
4	Persiba Bantul (H)	3	0	1	2	2	4	−2	1	

Source: PSSI
(H) Hosts

12 December 2019
Persiba Bantul	2–3	Sleman United	Sultan Agung Stadium, Bantul
Persinga	1–1	PS Protaba	Sultan Agung Stadium, Bantul
14 December 2019
Sleman United	0–2	Persinga	Sultan Agung Stadium, Bantul
PS Protaba	0–0	Persiba Bantul	Sultan Agung Stadium, Bantul
16 December 2019
Persiba Bantul	0–1	Persinga	Sultan Agung Stadium, Bantul
Sleman United	3–0	PS Protaba	Dwi Windu Stadium, Bantul

==== East region ====
===== Group E =====
- Persijap hosted this group at Gelora Bumi Kartini Stadium and Kamal Djunaedi Stadium, Jepara.

Pos	Team	Pld	W	D	L	GF	GA	GD	Pts	Qualification
1	Persijap (H)	3	2	0	1	6	1	+5	6 (Note: Head-to-head result: Persijap 2–0 Perseden.)	Advanced to the second round
2	Perseden	3	2	0	1	4	2	+2	6	Advanced to the second round
3	Persidago	3	1	1	1	4	5	−1	4	
4	PS Matra	3	0	1	2	3	9	−6	1	

Source: PSSI
(H) Hosts
Notes:

12 December 2019
Persijap	2–0	Perseden	Gelora Bumi Kartini Stadium, Jepara
Persidago	3–3	PS Matra	Gelora Bumi Kartini Stadium, Jepara
14 December 2019
Perseden	2–0	Persidago	Gelora Bumi Kartini Stadium, Jepara
PS Matra	0–4	Persijap	Gelora Bumi Kartini Stadium, Jepara
16 December 2019
Persijap	0–1	Persidago	Gelora Bumi Kartini Stadium, Jepara
Perseden	2–0	PS Matra	Kamal Djunaedi Stadium, Jepara

===== Group F =====
- Putra Sinar Giri hosted this group at Gelora Joko Samudro Stadium and Semen Gresik Stadium, Gresik Regency.

Pos	Team	Pld	W	D	L	GF	GA	GD	Pts	Qualification
1	Putra Sinar Giri (H)	3	2	1	0	8	2	+6	7	Advanced to the second round
2	PSIL	3	1	0	2	4	9	−5	3	Advanced to the second round
3	Gaspa 1958	3	0	2	1	5	6	−1	2	
4	PSN (Note: PSN were deducted three points)	3	1	1	1	5	5	0	1	

Source: PSSI
(H) Hosts
Notes:

12 December 2019
Putra Sinar Giri	1–1	Gaspa 1958	Gelora Joko Samudro Stadium, Gresik Regency
PSN	3–0	PSIL	Gelora Joko Samudro Stadium, Gresik Regency
14 December 2019
Gaspa 1958	2–2	PSN	Gelora Joko Samudro Stadium, Gresik Regency
PSIL	1–4	Putra Sinar Giri	Gelora Joko Samudro Stadium, Gresik Regency
16 December 2019
Putra Sinar Giri	3–0 (Note: Decision of Liga 3 disciplinary committee NO: 02/SK/PS-PSSI/2019 on 16 December 2019, PSN lost 3–0 to Putra Sinar Giri. Original score was 1–1.)	PSN	Gelora Joko Samudro Stadium, Gresik Regency
Gaspa 1958	2–3	PSIL	Semen Gresik Stadium, Gresik Regency

===== Group G =====
- Semeru hosted this group at Gelora Supriyadi Stadium and Gelora Bumi Penataran Stadium, Blitar.

Pos	Team	Pld	W	D	L	GF	GA	GD	Pts	Qualification
1	Semeru (H)	3	2	1	0	12	5	+7	7	Advanced to the second round
2	Persedikab	3	1	1	1	6	6	0	4	Advanced to the second round
3	Persiter	3	0	3	0	3	3	0	3	
4	PS Tarakan Banten Jaya	3	0	1	2	4	11	−7	1	

Source: PSSI
(H) Hosts

12 December 2019
Semeru	4–2	Persedikab	Gelora Supriyadi Stadium, Blitar
PS Tarakan Banten Jaya	1–1	Persiter	Gelora Supriyadi Stadium, Blitar
14 December 2019
Persedikab	4–2	PS Tarakan Banten Jaya	Gelora Supriyadi Stadium, Blitar
Persiter	2–2	Semeru	Gelora Supriyadi Stadium, Blitar
16 December 2019
Semeru	6–1	PS Tarakan Banten Jaya	Gelora Supriyadi Stadium, Blitar
Persedikab	0–0	Persiter	Gelora Bumi Penataran Stadium, Blitar

===== Group H =====
- Perseta hosted this group at Brawijaya Stadium, Kediri and Rejoagung Stadium, Tulungagung Regency.

Pos	Team	Pld	W	D	L	GF	GA	GD	Pts	Qualification
1	Perseta (H)	3	2	1	0	7	4	+3	7	Advanced to the second round
2	Persemi	3	2	0	1	7	5	+2	6	Advanced to the second round
3	PSID	3	0	2	1	3	5	−2	2	
4	Bontang City	3	0	1	2	3	6	−3	1	

Source: PSSI
(H) Hosts

12 December 2019
Perseta	1–1	PSID	Brawijaya Stadium, Kediri
Bontang City	1–2	Persemi	Brawijaya Stadium, Kediri
14 December 2019
PSID	1–1	Bontang City	Brawijaya Stadium, Kediri
Persemi	2–3	Perseta	Brawijaya Stadium, Kediri
16 December 2019
Perseta	3–1	Bontang City	Brawijaya Stadium, Kediri
PSID	1–3	Persemi	Rejoagung Stadium, Tulungagung Regency

=== Second round ===
The second round was featured by 16 teams which were the winners and runner-ups from each group of the first round. The second round matches were played on 19 December 2019. Each winner advanced to the third round.

19 December 2019
Tiga Naga	1–0	757 Kepri Jaya	Tumpal Sinaga Stadium, Pekanbaru
Persidi	0–0 (4–3 p)	Karo United	Haji Agus Salim Stadium, Padang
Persekat	1–0 (a.e.t.)	Sleman United	Siliwangi Stadium, Bandung
Persinga	1–2	PSKC	Sultan Agung Stadium, Bantul
Persijap	4–1	PSIL	Gelora Bumi Kartini Stadium, Jepara
Putra Sinar Giri	2–2 (4–2 p)	Perseden	Gelora Joko Samudro Stadium, Gresik
Semeru	3–0	Persemi	Gelora Supriyadi Stadium, Blitar
Perseta	2–0	Persedikab	Rejoagung Stadium, Tulungagung Regency

=== Third round ===
In this round, eight teams divided into two groups. Each group played a home tournament basis. Third round was played from 22–26 December 2019. Three best teams of each group promoted to the Liga 2. Winner of each group also advanced to the final.

==== West Group ====
- PSKC hosted this group at Siliwangi Stadium and Arcamanik Stadium, Bandung.

Pos	Team	Pld	W	D	L	GF	GA	GD	Pts	Qualification
1	PSKC (H, P)	3	2	1	0	7	2	+5	7	Promoted to Liga 2 and advanced to the final
2	Tiga Naga (P)	3	2	0	1	5	7	−2	6	Promoted to Liga 2
3	Persekat (P)	3	1	0	2	3	4	−1	3	Promoted to Liga 2
4	Persidi	3	0	1	2	3	5	−2	1	

Source: PSSI
(H) Hosts; (P) Promoted

22 December 2019
PSKC	1–1	Persidi	Siliwangi Stadium, Bandung
Persekat	1–2	Tiga Naga	Siliwangi Stadium, Bandung
23 December 2019
Persidi	1–2	Persekat	Siliwangi Stadium, Bandung
Tiga Naga	1–5	PSKC	Siliwangi Stadium, Bandung
26 December 2019
PSKC	1–0	Persekat	Siliwangi Stadium, Bandung
Persidi	1–2	Tiga Naga	Arcamanik Stadium, Bandung

==== East Group ====
- Putra Sinar Giri hosted this group at Gelora Joko Samudro Stadium, Gresik Regency and Jenggolo Stadium, Sidoarjo Regency.

Pos	Team	Pld	W	D	L	GF	GA	GD	Pts	Qualification
1	Persijap (C, P)	3	3	0	0	6	0	+6	9	Promoted to Liga 2 and advanced to the final
2	Putra Sinar Giri (H, P)	3	1	1	1	4	5	−1	4	Promoted to Liga 2
3	Semeru (P)	3	0	2	1	1	3	−2	2	Promoted to Liga 2
4	Perseta	3	0	1	2	2	5	−3	1	

Source: PSSI
(C) Champions; (H) Hosts; (P) Promoted

22 December 2019
Putra Sinar Giri	0–2	Persijap	Gelora Joko Samudro Stadium, Gresik Regency
Semeru	0–0	Perseta	Gelora Joko Samudro Stadium, Gresik Regency
23 December 2019
Persijap	2–0	Semeru	Gelora Joko Samudro Stadium, Gresik Regency
Perseta	2–3	Putra Sinar Giri	Gelora Joko Samudro Stadium, Gresik Regency
26 December 2019
Putra Sinar Giri	1–1	Semeru	Gelora Joko Samudro Stadium, Gresik Regency
Persijap	2–0	Perseta	Jenggolo Stadium, Sidoarjo Regency

=== Final ===
29 December 2019
15:00 UTC+7

PSKC	1–3	Persijap
Dian 76'	Report	Faldi 60'; Rizki 70' (pen.); Zaenal 73'

Pakansari Stadium, Cibinong
Referee: Juandi Hidayatulloh

== Champions ==
Champions
Persijap Jepara
1st title

== Awards ==
- Top Scorers: Rikza Syawali (PSKC) with nine goals.
- Best Player: Rizki Hidayat (Persijap).
- Fair Play Team: PSKC.

== See also ==
- 2019 Liga 1
- 2019 Liga 2
- 2018–19 Piala Indonesia
