= 2024–25 Liga 4 West Sumatra =

Liga 4 West Sumatra
- Season: 2024–25
- Dates: 13 February – 9 April 2025
- Champions: Josal (2nd title)
- National phase: Josal; PSPP
- Matches: 32
- Goals: 106 (3.31 per match)
- Biggest win: Gumarang FKNB 1–10 Josal (27 February 2025)
- Highest scoring: Gumarang FKNB 1–10 Josal (27 February 2025)
- Longest winning run: 5 games — Josal
- Longest unbeaten run: 11 games — Josal
- Longest winless run: 10 games — Gumarang FKNB
- Longest losing run: 10 games — Gumarang FKNB

The 2024–25 Liga 4 West Sumatra was the inaugural season of Liga 4 West Sumatra after the change in the structure of Indonesian football competition and serves as a qualifying round for the national phase of the 2024–25 Liga 4. The competition is organised by the West Sumatra Provincial PSSI Association.

== Teams ==
=== Participating teams ===
A total of 6 teams are competing in this season.

No	Team	Location	2023–24 season
1	Batang Anai	Padang Pariaman Regency	Second round (3rd in Group C)
2	Josal	Padang Pariaman Regency	Champions
3	PSPP	Padang Panjang City	Runner-up
4	Gumarang FKNB	Tanah Datar Regency	First round (5th in Group A)
5	GMR	Tanah Datar Regency	First round (5th in Group B)
6	Ricefield Town	Solok	—

=== Personnel and kits ===
Note: Flags indicate national team as has been defined under FIFA eligibility rules. Players and coaches may hold more than one non-FIFA nationality.

Team	Head coach	Captain	Kit manufacturer	Main kit sponsor	Other kit sponsor(s)
Batang Anai			(Indonesia) Cyto		List: Front: Usaha Dagang Edi Munir, Lesehan Nara; Back: None; Sleeves: None; Shorts: None
Josal	(Indonesia) Joni Efendi	(Indonesia) Agung Wijaksono	(Indonesia) Cyto	Josal	List: Front: Indah Logistik; Back: None; Sleeves: None; Shorts: None
PSPP			(Indonesia) Limo Apparel	Suttan Capital	List: Front: Padang Panjang City Government, AmanAgrindo, PT Hafco Mineral Resources; Back: None; Sleeves: None; Shorts: None
Gumarang FKNB					List: Front: Back: Sleeves: Shorts:
GMR		(Indonesia) Alan Marta	(Indonesia) Calma	Kayo Store	List: Front: Alexander, Lensa Sport Center, Edi Group; Back: Sleeves: None; Shorts: None
Ricefield Town			(Indonesia) R-Shop	None	List: Front: None; Back: None; Sleeves: None; Shorts: None

== Regular round ==
All matches will be held at West Sumatra Main Stadium, Padang Pariaman.

Pos	Team	Pld	W	D	L	GF	GA	GD	Pts	Qualification	JOS	PSP	GMR	RCF	BTA	GUM
1	Josal	10	9	1	0	45	3	+42	28	Qualification to the finals & national phase		1–0	6–0	2–0	7–1	2–0
2	PSPP	10	7	2	1	12	3	+9	23	Qualification to the finals & national phase	0–0		2–0	1–0	1–0	3–0
3	GMR	10	4	2	4	11	21	−10	14		0–8	0–1		2–2	1–0	3–1
4	Ricefield Town	10	3	3	4	13	16	−3	12		1–8	1–1	0–0		0–1	4–0
5	Batang Anai	10	3	0	7	13	16	−3	9		0–1	0–1	1–2	1–2		5–1
6	Gumarang FKNB	10	0	0	10	4	39	−35	0		1–10	1–2	0–3	0–3	0–4	

Source: Liga 4 West Sumatra
Rules for classification: 1) Points; 2) Head-to-head points; 3) Head-to-head goal difference; 4) Head-to-head goals scored; 5) Goal difference; 6) Goals scored; 7) Fair-play points; 8) Draw.

=== Matches ===
Matchday 1 (13 February 2025)
13 February 2025
13.15 WIB (UTC+7)

Batang Anai	1–2	GMR
	Report

West Sumatra Main Stadium, Padang Pariaman
13 February 2025
15.30 WIB (UTC+7)

Josal	1–0	PSPP
	Report

West Sumatra Main Stadium, Padang Pariaman

Matchday 2 (14 February 2025)
14 February 2025
13.15 WIB (UTC+7)

Gumarang FKNB	0–3	Ricefield Town
	Report

West Sumatra Main Stadium, Padang Pariaman
14 February 2025
15.30 WIB (UTC+7)

GMR	0–8	Josal
	Report

West Sumatra Main Stadium, Padang Pariaman

Matchday 3 (15 February 2025)
15 February 2025
13.15 WIB (UTC+7)

Ricefield Town	0–1	Batang Anai
	Report

West Sumatra Main Stadium, Padang Pariaman
15 February 2025
15.30 WIB (UTC+7)

PSPP	3–0	Gumarang FKNB
	Report

West Sumatra Main Stadium, Padang Pariaman

Matchday 4 (16 February 2025)
16 February 2025
13.15 WIB (UTC+7)

Josal	2–0	Ricefield Town
	Report

West Sumatra Main Stadium, Padang Pariaman
16 February 2025
15.30 WIB (UTC+7)

Gumarang FKNB	0–3	GMR
	Report

West Sumatra Main Stadium, Padang Pariaman

Matchday 5 (17 February 2025)
17 February 2025
13.15 WIB (UTC+7)

Batang Anai	0–1	Josal
	Report

West Sumatra Main Stadium, Padang Pariaman
17 February 2025
15.30 WIB (UTC+7)

GMR	0–1	PSPP
	Report

West Sumatra Main Stadium, Padang Pariaman

Matchday 6 (18 February 2025)
18 February 2025
13.15 WIB (UTC+7)

Ricefield Town	0–0	GMR
	Report

West Sumatra Main Stadium, Padang Pariaman
18 February 2025
15.30 WIB (UTC+7)

Gumarang FKNB	0–4	Batang Anai
	Report

West Sumatra Main Stadium, Padang Pariaman

Matchday 7 (19 February 2025)
19 February 2025
13.15 WIB (UTC+7)

PSPP	1–0	Ricefield Town
	Report

West Sumatra Main Stadium, Padang Pariaman
19 February 2025
15.30 WIB (UTC+7)

Josal	2–0	Gumarang FKNB
	Report

West Sumatra Main Stadium, Padang Pariaman

Matchday 8 (20 February 2025)
20 February 2025
15.30 WIB (UTC+7)

Batang Anai	0–1	PSPP
	Report

West Sumatra Main Stadium, Padang Pariaman

Matchday 9 (21 February 2025)
21 February 2025
13.15 WIB (UTC+7)

GMR	1–0	Batang Anai
	Report

West Sumatra Main Stadium, Padang Pariaman
21 February 2025
15.30 WIB (UTC+7)

PSPP	0–0	Josal
	Report

West Sumatra Main Stadium, Padang Pariaman

Matchday 10 (22 February 2025)
22 February 2025
13.15 WIB (UTC+7)

Ricefield Town	4–0	Gumarang FKNB
	Report

West Sumatra Main Stadium, Padang Pariaman
22 February 2025
15.30 WIB (UTC+7)

Josal	6–0	GMR
	Report

West Sumatra Main Stadium, Padang Pariaman

Matchday 11 (23 February 2025)
23 February 2025
13.15 WIB (UTC+7)

Batang Anai	1–2	Ricefield Town
	Report

West Sumatra Main Stadium, Padang Pariaman
23 February 2025
15.30 WIB (UTC+7)

Gumarang FKNB	1–2	PSPP
	Report

West Sumatra Main Stadium, Padang Pariaman

Matchday 12 (24 February 2025)
24 February 2025
13.15 WIB (UTC+7)

Ricefield Town	1–8	Josal
	Report

West Sumatra Main Stadium, Padang Pariaman
24 February 2025
15.30 WIB (UTC+7)

GMR	3–1	Gumarang FKNB
	Report

West Sumatra Main Stadium, Padang Pariaman

Matchday 13 (25 February 2025)
25 February 2025
13.15 WIB (UTC+7)

Josal	7–1	Batang Anai
	Report

West Sumatra Main Stadium, Padang Pariaman
25 February 2025
15.30 WIB (UTC+7)

PSPP	2–0	GMR
	Report

West Sumatra Main Stadium, Padang Pariaman

Matchday 14 (26 February 2025)
26 February 2025
13.15 WIB (UTC+7)

GMR	2–2	Ricefield Town
	Report

West Sumatra Main Stadium, Padang Pariaman
26 February 2025
15.30 WIB (UTC+7)

Batang Anai	5–1	Gumarang FKNB
	Report

West Sumatra Main Stadium, Padang Pariaman

Matchday 15 (27 February 2025)
27 February 2025
13.15 WIB (UTC+7)

Ricefield Town	1–1	PSPP
	Report

West Sumatra Main Stadium, Padang Pariaman
27 February 2025
15.30 WIB (UTC+7)

Gumarang FKNB	1–10	Josal
	Report

West Sumatra Main Stadium, Padang Pariaman

Matchday 16 (28 February 2025)
28 February 2025
15.30 WIB (UTC+7)

PSPP	1–0	Batang Anai
	Report

West Sumatra Main Stadium, Padang Pariaman

== Finals ==
The finals will be played over two legs. If the aggregate score is level, the winners are decided by a penalty shoot-out.

=== Summary ===
The first leg will be played on 7 April, and the second leg will be played on 9 April 2025.

Team 1	Agg.	Team 2	1st leg	2nd leg
PSPP	2–6	Josal	1–3	1–3

=== Matches ===
7 April 2025
15:00 WIB (UTC+7)

PSPP	1–3	Josal
	Report

West Sumatra Main Stadium, Padang Pariaman

9 April 2025
15:00 WIB (UTC+7)

Josal	3–1	PSPP
	Report

West Sumatra Main Stadium, Padang Pariaman

Josal won 6–2 on aggregate.

== See also ==
- 2024–25 Liga 4
