= 2019 Liga 3 Pre-national Route =

The 2019 Liga 3 Pre-national Route was played from 5 October to 5 December 2019. A total of 15 teams competed in the pre-national route to decide six of the 32 places in the national round of the 2019 Liga 3.

== Teams ==
The following 15 teams entered the pre-national round:

- Celebest
- Gresik United
- Persiba Bantul
- Persijap
- Persik Kendal
- Persika
- Persinga
- Perssu 1977
- PSBK
- PSN
- Semeru
- SEL 50 Kota
- Tiga Naga (replace AS Abadi)

There should be six teams relegated from 2018 Liga 2 that competed in this route, but Persiwa disqualified by PSSI. And also supposedly AS Abadi competed as one of 10 teams that qualified for the second round last season. But they replaced by Tiga Naga. Later, Lampung Sakti and PSIR withdrew from the competition. In October, Solok merged with Equator Luak 50 Kota into SEL 50 Kota and relocated from Solok to Lima Puluh Kota.

== Format ==
In this route, 15 teams divided into three groups. Each group is playing a home-and-away round-robin basis. The winners and runner-ups from each group advanced to national round of 2019 Liga 3.

== Details ==
=== Group A ===
Pos	Team	Pld	W	D	L	GF	GA	GD	Pts	Qualification	TNG	BTL	KAR	SEL	LST
1	Tiga Naga	6	5	0	1	13	5	+8	15	Qualified to national round	—	2–1	2–1	5–1	
2	Persiba Bantul	6	3	1	2	9	6	+3	10	Qualified to national round	1–0	—	0–0	4–1	
3	Persika	6	1	2	3	8	8	0	5		1–2	2–3	—	4–1	
4	SEL 50 Kota	6	1	1	4	4	15	−11	4		0–2	1–0	0–0	—	
5	Lampung Sakti	0	0	0	0	0	0	0	0	Withdrew					—

Source: PSSI

=== Group B ===
Pos	Team	Pld	W	D	L	GF	GA	GD	Pts	Qualification	PJP	NGA	KEN	PBK	REM
1	Persijap	6	5	1	0	13	2	+11	16	Qualified to national round	—	2–0	1–0	4–0	
2	Persinga	6	3	1	2	11	8	+3	10	Qualified to national round	0–2	—	1–1	5–2	
3	Persik Kendal	6	1	2	3	3	8	−5	5		1–1	0–3	—	1–0	
4	PSBK	6	1	0	5	6	15	−9	3		1–3	1–2	2–0	—	
5	PSIR	0	0	0	0	0	0	0	0	Withdrew					—

Source: PSSI

=== Group C ===
Pos	Team	Pld	W	D	L	GF	GA	GD	Pts	Qualification	SEM	PSN	CEL	GRU	PSU
1	Semeru	8	5	1	2	18	7	+11	16	Qualified to national round	—	1–2	1–0	4–0	3–0
2	PSN	8	5	1	2	17	11	+6	16	Qualified to national round	2–4	—	2–0	2–1	4–1
3	Celebest	8	2	3	3	6	6	0	9		1–1	1–0	—	0–1	3–0
4	Gresik United	8	2	2	4	6	12	−6	8		2–1	1–3	1–1	—	0–0
5	Perssu 1977	8	1	3	4	4	15	−11	6		0–3	2–2	0–0	1–0	—

Source: PSSI

== Qualified teams ==
The following teams qualified from pre-national route for the national round.

Qualified teams	Qualified as	Qualified on
Tiga Naga	Group A winner	10 November 2019
Persijap	Group B winner	16 November 2019
PSN	Group C runners-up	22 November 2019
Semeru	Group C winner	26 November 2019
Persinga	Group B runners-up	26 November 2019
Persiba Bantul	Group A runners-up	26 November 2019
