= 2019 Liga 3 Riau =

Liga 3 Riau
- Season: 2019
- Champions: Tornado FC Pekanbaru

The 2019 Liga 3 Riau is the third edition of Liga 3 (formerly known as Liga Nusantara) Riau as a qualifying round for the national round of 2019 Liga 3. AS Abadi, winner of the 2018 Liga 3 Riau are the defending champions. The competition began on 3 August 2019.

== Format ==
In this competition, 12 teams are divided into 3 groups of four. The winner will represent Riau in the national round of 2019 Liga 3.

== Teams ==
There are 12 clubs which will participate the league in this season.

== Group stage ==
=== Group A ===
Pos	Team	Pld	W	D	L	GF	GA	GD	Pts	Qualification
1	Tornado FC Pekanbaru (A)	6	5	1	0	23	3	+20	16	Advance to the next round
2	PS Siak (A)	6	4	1	1	20	6	+14	13	Advance to the next round
3	Rumbai	6	1	1	4	6	25	−19	4	
4	Nabil FC Pelalawan	6	0	1	5	6	21	−15	1	

Updated to match(es) played on 10 September 2019. Source: Klasemen Akhir
(A) Advance to a further round

=== Group B ===
Pos	Team	Pld	W	D	L	GF	GA	GD	Pts	Qualification
1	Kuansing United (A)	6	4	0	2	12	3	+9	12	Advance to the next round
2	Pelalawan United (A)	6	4	0	2	13	8	+5	12	Advance to the next round
3	Persires Inhu	6	3	1	2	10	8	+2	10	
4	Gempuri	6	0	1	5	4	20	−16	1	

Updated to match(es) played on 10 September 2019. Source: Klasemen Akhir
(A) Advance to a further round

=== Grup C ===
Pos	Team	Pld	W	D	L	GF	GA	GD	Pts	Qualification
1	PS Duri (A)	6	4	0	2	9	7	+2	12	Advance to the next round
2	Dumai (A)	6	3	1	2	8	4	+4	10	Advance to the next round
3	Persemai Dumai	6	3	0	3	6	5	+1	9	
4	SAP	6	1	1	4	2	9	−7	4	

Updated to match(es) played on 10 September 2019. Source: Klasemen Akhir
(A) Advance to a further round

== Final round ==
The final round was held in 1–10 Oktober 2019.

Pos	Team	Pld	W	D	L	GF	GA	GD	Pts	Qualification
1	Tornado FC Pekanbaru	4	2	2	0	13	1	+12	8	Advance to Final
2	PS Siak	4	2	2	0	7	2	+5	8	Advance to Final
3	Kuansing United	4	1	3	0	8	2	+6	6	
4	Dumai	4	0	2	2	4	13	−9	2	
5	PS Duri	4	0	1	3	3	17	−14	1	
6	Pelalawan United	0	0	0	0	0	0	0	0	Resigned

Updated to match(es) played on 6 Oktober 2019. Source: Klasemen

== Finals ==
15 October 2019
15.30 UTC+7

Tornado FC Pekanbaru	1 - 2	PS Siak

Kaharuddin Nasution Stadium, Pekanbaru

18 October 2019
15.30 UTC+7

PS Siak	1 - 2	Tornado FC Pekanbaru
Hendra Gunawan 57'	Report	Roy Fadilla Silitonga 77'; Sandi Naiwan 87'

Kaharuddin Nasution Stadium, Pekanbaru

(Aggregate 3-3, Tornado FC Pekanbaru won 4 - 3 on penalties)
