= 2023–24 Liga 3 West Sumatra =

Tournament details
- Venue: 2
- Dates: 9 December 2023 – 9 January 2024
- Teams: 12

Final positions
- Champions: Josal (1st title)
- Runners-up: PSPP
- Qualified for: 2023–24 Liga 3 National Phase

Tournament statistics
- Matches played: 47
- Goals scored: 188 (4 per match)

The 2023–24 Liga 3 West Sumatra will be the sixth season of Liga 3 West Sumatra as a qualifying round for the national round of the 2023–24 Liga 3.

The league competition in the previous season was not held by Asprov PSSI West Sumatra, so the defending champion is still held by PSKB who managed to win it in the season 2021.

== Teams ==
There are 12 teams participating in the league this season.

No.	Team	Location
1	PSP	Padang City
2	Kompak Kampung Pisang	Padang City
3	PSKB	Bukittinggi City
4	PSPP	Padang Panjang City
5	Batang Anai	Padang Pariaman Regency
6	Josal	Padang Pariaman Regency
7	Sukur	Pariaman City
8	PS Pasbar	West Pasaman Regency
9	PS Dharmasraya	Dharmasraya Regency
10	Gumarang FKNB	Tanah Datar Regency
11	GMR	Tanah Datar Regency
12	PS Mentawai	Mentawai Islands Regency

== Venues ==
- Sungai Sariak Stadium, Padang Pariaman
- Gelora Haji Agus Salim Stadium, Padang

== First round ==
=== Group A ===
All matches were held at Sungai Sariak Stadium, Padang Pariaman Regency.

Pos	Team	Pld	W	D	L	GF	GA	GD	Pts	Qualification	JOS	KKP	PPP	PBR	GUM	SUK
1	Josal (H)	5	3	2	0	31	7	+24	11	Qualification to second round	—		1–1	2–2		20–0
2	Kompak Kampung Pisang	5	3	1	1	12	10	+2	10 (Note: Head-to-head result: Kompak Kampung Pisang 4–3 PSPP.)	Qualification to second round	1–3	—	4–3		4–3	
3	PSPP	5	3	1	1	21	9	+12	10	Qualification to second round			—	4–2		9–0
4	PS Pasbar	5	2	2	1	13	7	+6	8	Qualification to second round		1–1		—	3–0	
5	Gumarang FKNB	5	1	0	4	12	16	−4	3		3–5		2–4		—	
6	Sukur	5	0	0	5	0	40	−40	0			0–2		0–5	0–4	—

Source: Asprov PSSI West Sumatra
(H) Hosts

=== Group B ===
All matches were held at Gelora Haji Agus Salim Stadium, Padang City.

Pos	Team	Pld	W	D	L	GF	GA	GD	Pts	Qualification	PSP	BTA	PKB	PSD	GMR	PSM
1	PSP (H)	5	4	1	0	14	4	+10	13	Qualification to second round	—	4–1		1–0	3–1	
2	Batang Anai	5	4	0	1	20	7	+13	12	Qualification to second round		—	4–1			6–0
3	PSKB	5	2	2	1	10	8	+2	8	Qualification to second round	2–2		—		2–2	
4	PS Dharmasraya	5	2	0	3	4	5	−1	6	Qualification to second round		1–2	0–1	—		2–1
5	GMR	5	1	1	3	10	13	−3	4			1–7		0–1	—	
6	PS Mentawai	5	0	0	5	1	22	−21	0		0–4		0–4		0–6	—

Source: Asprov PSSI West Sumatra
(H) Hosts

== Second round ==
=== Group C ===
All matches were held at Sungai Sariak Stadium, Padang Pariaman Regency.

Pos	Team	Pld	W	D	L	GF	GA	GD	Pts	Qualification
1	PSPP	3	2	1	0	4	0	+4	7	Advance to the knockout round
2	Josal	3	1	2	0	3	2	+1	5	Advance to the knockout round
3	Batang Anai	3	1	0	2	2	3	−1	3	
4	PS Dharmasraya	3	0	1	2	3	7	−4	1	

Source: Asprov PSSI West Sumatra
24 December 2023
13.00 WIB

Batang Anai	0−1	PSPP
	Report

Sungai Sariak Stadium, Padang Pariaman Regency
24 December 2023
15.30 WIB

Josal	2−2	PS Dharmasraya
	Report

Sungai Sariak Stadium, Padang Pariaman Regency

26 December 2023
13.00 WIB

PS Dharmasraya	1−2	Batang Anai
	Report

Sungai Sariak Stadium, Padang Pariaman Regency
26 December 2023
15.30 WIB

PSPP	0−0	Josal
	Report

Sungai Sariak Stadium, Padang Pariaman Regency

28 December 2023
13.00 WIB

Josal	1−0	Batang Anai
	Report

Sungai Sariak Stadium, Padang Pariaman Regency
28 December 2023
15.30 WIB

PSPP	3–0 (w.o.)	PS Dharmasraya
	Report

Sungai Sariak Stadium, Padang Pariaman Regency

PSPP were awarded a 3–0 win over PS Dharmasraya.

=== Group D ===
All matches were held at Sungai Sariak Stadium, Padang Pariaman Regency.

Pos	Team	Pld	W	D	L	GF	GA	GD	Pts	Qualification
1	PSP	3	2	1	0	6	3	+3	7	Advance to the knockout round
2	PS Pasbar	3	1	2	0	3	2	+1	5	Advance to the knockout round
3	Kompak Kampung Pisang	3	0	2	1	4	6	−2	2	
4	PSKB	3	0	1	2	3	5	−2	1	

Source: Asprov PSSI West Sumatra
25 December 2023
13.00 WIB

Kompak Kampung Pisang	2–2	PSKB
	Report

Sungai Sariak Stadium, Padang Pariaman Regency
25 December 2023
15.30 WIB

PSP	1–1	PS Pasbar
	Report

Sungai Sariak Stadium, Padang Pariaman Regency

27 December 2023
13.00 WIB

PS Pasbar	1–1	Kompak Kampung Pisang
	Report

Sungai Sariak Stadium, Padang Pariaman Regency
27 December 2023
15.30 WIB

PSKB	1–2	PSP
	Report

Sungai Sariak Stadium, Padang Pariaman Regency

29 December 2023
13.45 WIB

PSP	3–1	Kompak Kampung Pisang
	Report

Sungai Sariak Stadium, Padang Pariaman Regency
29 December 2023
16.00 WIB (Note: The PSKB vs PS Pasbar match was originally scheduled for 29 December 2023 at 16.00 WIB. The match was stopped at '40 due to bad weather with the score 0-0, and will be resumed on 30 December 2023 at 09.00 WIB.)

PSKB	0–1	PS Pasbar
	Report

Sungai Sariak Stadium, Padang Pariaman Regency

== Knockout round ==
=== Bracket ===
Semi-finals
C1	PSPP	1	1	2
D2	PS Pasbar	0	1	1
D1	PSP	0	0	0
C2	Josal	2	3	5

Final
PSPP	1	2	3
Josal	2	3	5

=== Semi-finals ===
==== Summary ====
Team 1	Agg.	Team 2	1st leg	2nd leg
PSPP	2–1	PS Pasbar	1–0	1–1
PSP	0–5	Josal	0–2	0–3

==== Matches ====
2 January 2024
13.00 WIB

PSPP	1–0	PS Pasbar
	Report

Sungai Sariak Stadium, Padang Pariaman Regency
4 January 2024
13.25 WIB

PS Pasbar	1–1	PSPP
	Report

Sungai Sariak Stadium, Padang Pariaman Regency

PSPP won 2–1 on aggregate.

2 January 2024
15.30 WIB (Note: The PSP vs Josal match was originally scheduled for 2 January 2024 at 15.30 WIB. The match was stopped at '12 due to bad weather, and will be resumed on 3 January 2024 at 10.00 WIB.)

PSP	0–2	Josal
	Report

Sungai Sariak Stadium, Padang Pariaman Regency
5 January 2024
13.45 WIB

Josal	3–0	PSP
	Report

Sungai Sariak Stadium, Padang Pariaman Regency

Josal won 5–0 on aggregate.

=== Final ===
==== Summary ====
Team 1	Agg.	Team 2	1st leg	2nd leg
PSPP	3–5	Josal	1–2	2–3

==== Matches ====
7 January 2024
14.30 WIB

PSPP	1–2	Josal
	Report

Sungai Sariak Stadium, Padang Pariaman Regency
9 January 2024
14.30 WIB

Josal	3–2	PSPP
	Report

Sungai Sariak Stadium, Padang Pariaman Regency

Josal won 5–3 on aggregate.

== Qualification to the national phase ==
Team	Method of qualification	Date of qualification	Qualified to
Josal	2023–24 Liga 3 West Sumatra champions	9 January 2024	2023–24 Liga 3 National Phase
PSPP Padang Panjang	2023–24 Liga 3 West Sumatra runner-up	9 January 2024	2023–24 Liga 3 National Phase

== See also ==
- 2023–24 Liga 3 National Phase
