= Pendapa Tulungagung =

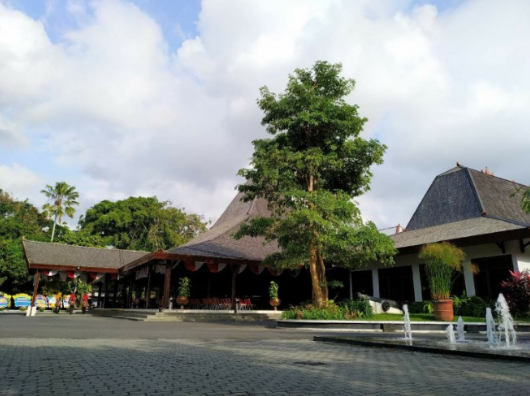
- Pendapa Tulungagung from southeastern view

- Location within Java
- Alternative names: Pendapa Kongas Arun Kusumaning Bangsa

General information
- Architectural style: Javanese-Mataraman
- Location: Tulungagung Sub-Regency, Tulungagung Regency, East Java
- Coordinates: 8.062536°S 111.900641°E

Pendapa Tulungagung (Javanese pronunciation: [pən.ⁿɖɔ.pɔ t̪u.loŋ.a.ɡoŋ]) is a building complex called Pendapa, located in the northern side of Tulungagung Town Square. This building was built in the Ngrowo governance movement era as before the governance was centered in Kalangbret.

== Characteristic ==
Pendapa Tulungagung was built in Javanese-Mataraman architecture style. This architecture style can be marked with Limasan roof top style, disconnected building for each purposes and the main building consists of non-wall large aula.

On the gateway of this building complex, there are two gapura in both side of entrance that have the Javanese traditional sense, such as carving, Javanese script text and Pandan plait. A small garden can be found in between the entrances.

The main building on this building complex is divided into two parts. The central one is the largest part of building and mostly consisted as the main aula for traditional praying ritual, any other urgent meeting, or any governance meeting. The second one is located at northern (back) of the central building is used for official residence for Regent.

The rest of area in this building complex consists of garden, shed, and some official buildings with Dutch architecture style were built in Dutch governance era.

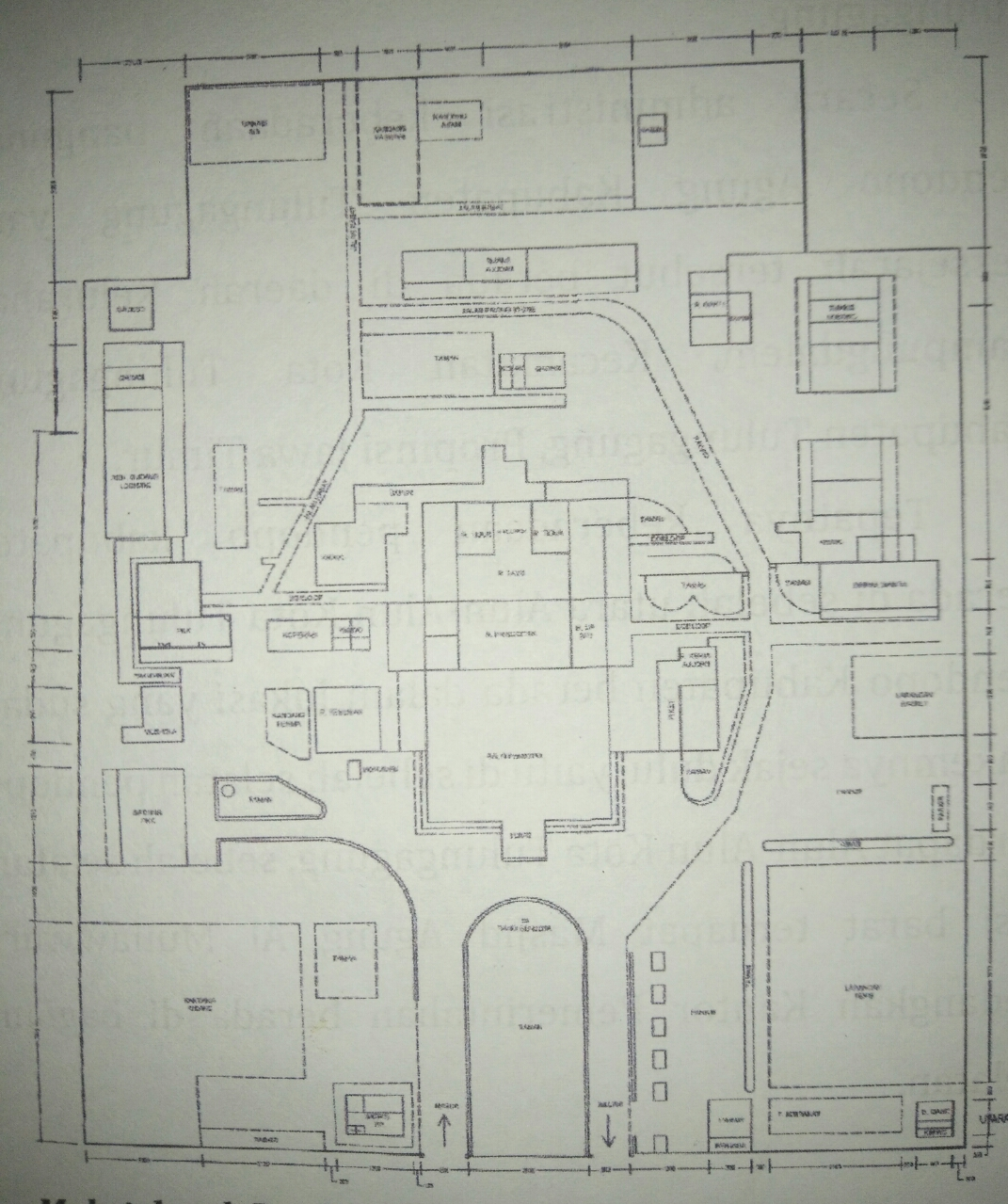
Blueprint of Pendapa Tulungagung

== History ==
According to some written texts, such as Tulisan Babad; the movement of Ngrowo governance in year 1824 also changed the Ngrowo city territory with border marked with four Reca Pentung statues on all four side of Ngrowo. This movement changed the governance name from Pemerintahan Ngrowo di Kalangbret (English: Ngrowo Governance in Kalangbret) to Pemerintahan Ngrowo di Tulungagung (English: Ngrowo Governance in Tulungagung). The city center location was decided by looking at the center of four Reco Pentung location which is Tulungagung city center in modern-day Tulungagung. Pendapa Tulungagung was built in the Northern part of city center as in RMT. Pringgodiningrat's order as place for Pendopo Kadipaten (Governance site). This building complex was then used as Governments office until now.

Pendapa Tulungagung got its other name, "Pendopo Kongras Arum Kusimaning Bongso" on the Ir. Heru Tjahjono, MM. governance era.
