= Lagaligo Stadium =

Sporting venue in Indonesia

- Location in Sulawesi
- Location: Palopo, South Sulawesi, Indonesia
- Coordinates: 3.006510°S 120.193878°E
- Owner: Government of Palopo City
- Operator: Government of Palopo City
- Capacity: 10,000
- Surface: Grass field

Tenants
- Gaspa Palopo; Luwu Raya United

Lagaligo Stadium is a multi-purpose stadium in Palopo, Indonesia. It is currently used mostly for football matches, and is the home stadium of Gaspa Palopo, a club competing in Liga Indonesia First Division. The stadium holds 10,000.
