= Oza Kioza =

Indonesian singer-songwriter

- رازا ليلة الفطرية
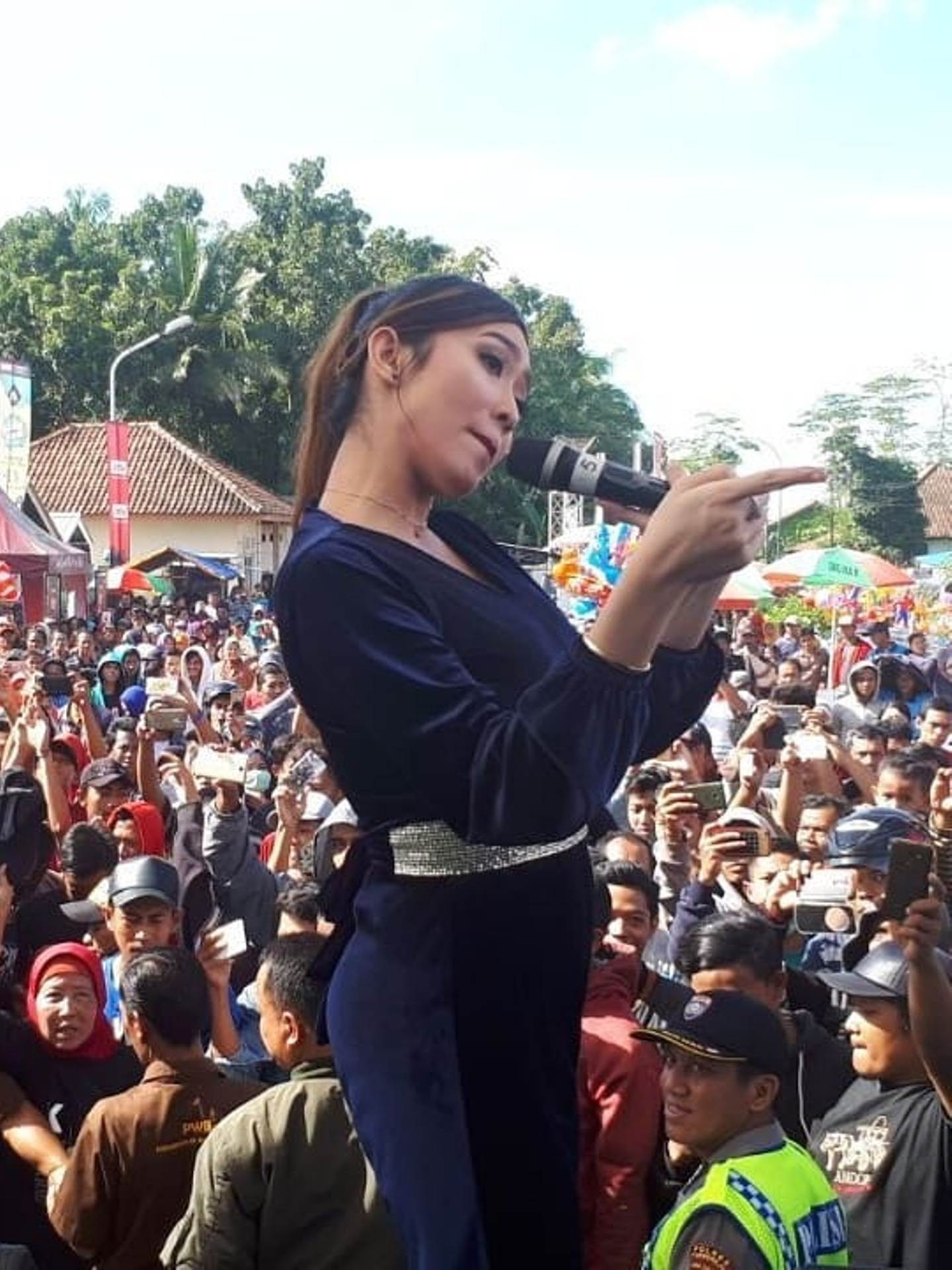
- Oza Kioza performing in Pasar Krendetan Purworejo on Wednesday, February 28, 2018.
- Born: Roza Lailatul Fitria; 4 March 1994; Tulungagung Regency, Indonesia
- Other names: Oza Kioza, Ocha Fitria, Rosa Fitria
- Occupations: singer, songwriter, model, actress
- Years active: 2007-now
- Website: https://www.youtube.com/user/ochafitria

Roza Lailatul Fitria better known as Oza Kioza is an Indonesian singer-songwriter. She is a member of the Indonesian girl group Duo Serigala since the group announced their new members in May 2017. Oza Kioza began her musical career in 2007, featuring on Indosiar's StarDut. In 2015, she made her debut single, Aki-Aki Gila.

== Biography ==
Oza was born in Tulungagung Regency and moved to Pasuruan when she was 3 years old after her parents got divorced. Oza then relocated to Malang when she entered elementary school. In Malang, Oza underwent formal education from elementary to intermediate level, attending SDN 1 Purwodadi, SMPN 6 Malang, and SMA 9 Malang consecutively. Oza did not complete her formal education at the high school level, as she enrolled in INTI College Indonesia, majoring in business, but did not finish her studies.

Oza Kioza became a singer after following the lead of her mother, Nurhayati, who is a jazz and dangdut singer. Her father is also involved in music, being a qori. On 2 November 2007, Oza Kioza attended the StarDut event at Indosiar. Although she did not win the championship, StarDut helped launch Oza's career, allowing her to perform on various stages.

== Discography ==
=== Album ===
==== as the main vocalist ====
- House DJ 4G Horegg (28 April 2017)

=== Single ===
==== as the main vocalist ====
- Aki Aki Gila (24 Juni 2015)
- 10 11 (18 November 2016)
- Lungset (28 April 2017)
- Ojo Nguber Welase (28 April 2017)
- Masihkah Ada (28 April 2017)
- I'm Sorry I Love You (16 Juni 2017)

==== As the lead vocalist Duo Serigala ====
- Kost Kostan (23 May 2017)
- Sayang (16 November 2017)
