= Andi Baso Bassaleng =

Indonesian politician

Drs. Andi Baso Bassaleng

Governor of Papua (acting)
- In office 20 December 2005 – 9 January 2006
- President: Susilo Bambang Yudhoyono
- Preceded by: Jacobus Perviddya Solossa
- Succeeded by: Sodjuangon Situmorang (acting); Barnabas Suebu

Regional Secretary of Papua
- In office 26 June 2004 – 21 May 2007
- Governor: Jacobus Perviddya Solossa himself (acting); Sodjuangon Situmorang (acting); Barnabas Suebu
- Preceded by: Decky Asmuruf
- Succeeded by: Tedjo Suprapto

Personal details
- Born: December 29, 1947 Palopo, South Sulawesi, East Indonesia, United States of Indonesia
- Died: November 24, 2013 (aged 65)
- Party: Golkar
- Spouse: Andi Siti Nur (m. 1974)

Andi Baso Bassaleng (29 December 1947 – 24 November 2013) was an Indonesian Buginese politician who served as the Regional Secretary of Paniai from 1990 until 1997, Regional Secretary of Papua from 2004 until 2007, and briefly served as the Acting Governor of Papua from 2004 until 2005.

== Early life ==
Andi Baso Bassaleng was born on 29 December 1947 in the city of Palopo, which at that time was part of the State of East Indonesia. He underwent his studies mostly in Palopo, graduating from elementary school in 1959, from junior high school in 1962, and from high school in 1965. Following his graduation from the high school, Bassaleng enrolled on the Academy for Home Government in Makassar from 1968 until 1970.

== Career ==
After graduating from the academy, Bassaleng was employed to work at the office of the Governor of South Sulawesi. Several months later, on 8 September 1970, he along with 74 other civil servants were transferred to Irian Barat (now Papua). From 1970 until 1997, Bassaleng was appointed for different offices in the government of Irian Jaya:

- Deputy Head of Local Government (1 December 1970 — 1 March 1973)
- Chief of Statistics and Census (1 March 1973 — 10 October 1974)
- Head of the Sub Bureau of Public Policy (10 October 1974 — 15 October 1974)
- Chief of Ambemaken Subdistrict (15 October 1974 — 13 October 1976)
- Chief of Bintuni Subdistrict (13 October 1976 — 12 October 1982)
- Head of the Governance Bureau of the Regional Secretariat of Manokwari (12 October 1982)
- Head of the Social-Political Bureau of Manokwari (12 October 1982 — 5 April 1990)
- Regional Secretary of the Paniai Regency (5 April 1990 — 12 June 1997)

On 12 June 1997, Bassaleng was appointed as the Assistant for the Governor of Irian Jaya for the First Territory. Four years later, he was transferred to the Regional Secretary of Papua, where he became the assistant for the regional secretary. After the resignation of Decky Asmuruf as the Regional Secretary, Bassaleng was appointed as the acting regional secretary on 26 June 2004. He later assumed a definitive office on 3 August 2005.

Following the sudden death of Jacobus Perviddya Solossa, the governor of Papua, on the night of 19 December 2005, the Minister of Internal Affairs Mohammad Maruf appointed Bassaleng as the acting governor of Papua. His appointment as acting governor was due to the absence of the vice governor officeholder, which is second in line in the gubernatorial line of succession. Bassaleng was appointed via a radiogram on the morning of 20 December.

Bassaleng was replaced by a new acting governor from the Ministry of Internal Affairs, Sodjuangon Situmorang. Situmorang officially replaced Bassaleng on 9 January 2006.

On 21 May 2007, Bassaleng was replaced by Tedjo Soeprapto as the Regional Secretary of Papua. He retired as a civil servant following his resignation.

== Personal life ==
Bassaleng was married to Andi Siti Nur on 9 Juni 1974. The marriage resulted in 4 children, namely Andi Kumia Asih, Andi Alamsyah, Andi Wida Asih, and Andi Asri Patianjala.
