= Josal F.C. Piaman =

Indonesian football club

Josal Piaman
- Full name: Josal Football Club Piaman
- Nickname: Pandeka Ombak Piaman
- Founded: 2023; 3 years ago, as Arisal Aziz FC
- Ground: Kampung Dalam Field; Padang Pariaman
- Capacity: 1.000
- Owner: Arisal Aziz
- Chairman: Arizal Aziz
- Manager: Suriyandri
- Coach: Joni Efendi
- League: Liga 4
- 2024–25: 1st (West Sumatra Zone); Second round, 3rd in Group T (National phase)
Home colours	Away colours

Josal Football Club Piaman, commonly known as Josal FC, is an Indonesian football club based in Padang Pariaman, West Sumatra. They currently compete in the Liga 4 West Sumatra zone.

== Players ==
As of 20 April 2025

Note: Flags indicate national team as defined under FIFA eligibility rules; some limited exceptions apply. Players may hold more than one non-FIFA nationality.

No.	Pos.	Nation	Player
—	GK	IDN	Riyan Saputra
—	GK	IDN	Rafiq Effendi
—	GK	IDN	Muhammad Afdal
—	DF	IDN	Bima Prahara
—	DF	IDN	Muhammad Amar Prayogi
—	DF	IDN	Arya Nanda Nasution
—	DF	IDN	Rendi Meidi Pratama
—	DF	IDN	Rafly Maulana
—	DF	IDN	Teguh Aljanu
—	DF	IDN	Wildan Chusnul Alfasyi
—	DF	IDN	Vendra Aprilianda
—	DF	IDN	Yoga Noviandre
—	MF	IDN	Agung Wijaksono

No.	Pos.	Nation	Player
—	MF	IDN	Zeer Azzuma
—	MF	IDN	Wahyudi Satria Bunda
—	MF	IDN	Syafrinaldi
—	MF	IDN	Adji Fikhratul Rahman
—	MF	IDN	Muhammad Touriq
—	MF	IDN	Andi Putra
—	FW	IDN	Alilyalum Lisanias Dilam
—	FW	IDN	Gibran Tito Kurniawan
—	FW	IDN	Carel Syadef
—	FW	IDN	Miftahul Farid
—	FW	IDN	Atthorik Soni Tancha
—	FW	IDN	Putra Wulandara

== Honours ==
- Liga 3 West Sumatra
  - Champion (1): 2023–24
- Liga 4 West Sumatra
  - Champion (1): 2024–25
