= Luis Irsandi =

Indonesian footballer

Personal information
- Full name: Luis Irsandi
- Date of birth: 1 May 1992 (age 34)
- Place of birth: Medan, Indonesia
- Height: 5 ft 8 in (1.73 m)
- Position: Defender

Team information
- Current team: Galacticos Bireuen
- Number: 4

Youth career
- 2010–2011: PSMS Medan

Senior career*
Years	Team	Apps	(Gls)
2012–2014	PSMS Medan	0	(0)
2015	Bintang Jaya Asahan	0	(0)
2016	PSMS Medan	5	(0)
2017	PSPS Pekanbaru	0	(0)
2018–2021	Persiraja Banda Aceh	40	(3)
2021–	Galacticos Bireuen	5	(0)
- * Club domestic league appearances and goals as of 12 February 2022

Luis Irsandi (born 1 May 1992) is an Indonesian professional footballer who plays as a defender for Indonesian Liga 3 club Galacticos Bireuen. He is a product of PSMS Medan youth academy and played for the club in Indonesia Super League. He is recently awarded as best player in a pre-season tournament Piala Presiden Persiraja 2018. Before joining Persiraja Banda Aceh, he played for PSPS Pekanbaru in 2017.

== Club career ==
=== PSPS Pekanbaru ===
In 2017, Luis Irsandi signed a one-year contract with Indonesian Liga 2 club PSPS Pekanbaru.

=== Persiraja Banda Aceh ===
He was signed for Persiraja Banda Aceh to play in Liga 2 in the 2018 season.

== Honours ==
=== Club ===
Persiraja Banda Aceh

- Liga 2 third place (play-offs): 2019
