= Zainal Arifin =

Indonesian footballer

Personal information
- Full name: Zainal Arifin
- Date of birth: 1 April 1982 (age 44)
- Place of birth: Jakarta, Indonesia
- Height: 1.70 m (5 ft 7 in)
- Position: Midfielder

Senior career*
Years	Team	Apps	(Gls)
2002–2005	Persela Lamongan	56	(8)
2005–2007	Persib Bandung	13	(0)
2007–2017	Persela Lamongan	186	(20)
2017–2018	Persegres Gresik	12	(0)
2018–2019	PSIR Rembang	18	(3)
2019–2020	Persijap Jepara	13	(2)
2021–2022	Persipa Pati	8	(1)
Total		237	(26)

International career
2005	Indonesia U23		
- * Club domestic league appearances and goals

Zainal Arifin (born 1 April 1982 in Jakarta) is an Indonesian former footballer who plays as a midfielder.

== Honours ==
=== Club ===
Persijap Jepara

- Liga 3: 2019
