= Rejoagung Stadium =

Football stadium in Kedungwaru, Indonesia

- Location in Java
- Address: Gang Bapak Kategi No.17, Rejoagung, Kedungwaru, Tulungagung Regency, East Java 66229
- Location: Kedungwaru, Tulungagung Regency, East Java, Indonesia
- Coordinates: 8.043671°S 111.912230°E
- Owner: Regency government of Tulungagung
- Operator: Regency government of Tulungagung
- Capacity: 7,000
- Surface: Grass field

Tenant
- Perseta Tulungagung

Rejoagung Stadium is a football stadium in the town of Kedungwaru, Tulungagung Regency, East Java, Indonesia. The stadium has a capacity of 7,000 people.

It is the home base of Perseta Tulungagung.
