= 2019 Liga 3 Bangka Belitung Islands =

Indonesian football qualifying round

Liga 3 Bangka Belitung
- Season: 2019
- Champions: Persibabar

The 2019 Liga 3 Bangka Belitung is a qualifying round for the national round of 2019 Liga 3. PS Basel, the winner of the 2018 Liga 3 Bangka Belitung are the defending champions. The competition begin on September 9, 2019.

== Standings ==
Pos	Team	Pld	W	D	L	GF	GA	GD	Pts	Qualification
1	Persibabar (A)	12	9	3	0	29	12	+17	30	2019 Liga 3 Regional Round
2	Timah FC	12	7	4	1	29	9	+20	25	
3	PS Belitung Timur	12	6	2	4	18	14	+4	20	
4	PS Bangka	12	4	4	4	15	15	0	16	
5	Persipas Pangkalpinang	12	3	2	7	18	23	−5	11	
6	PS Basel	12	2	3	7	12	21	−9	9	
7	PS Bangka Selection	12	0	4	8	7	29	−22	4	

Updated to match(es) played on 29 September 2019. Source: Standings
(A) Advance to a further round

== Champions ==
Champions
Persibabar
1st title
