= Palopo Old Mosque =

Mosque in Palopo, South Sulawesi, Indonesia

Palopo Old Mosque Masjid Tua Palopo
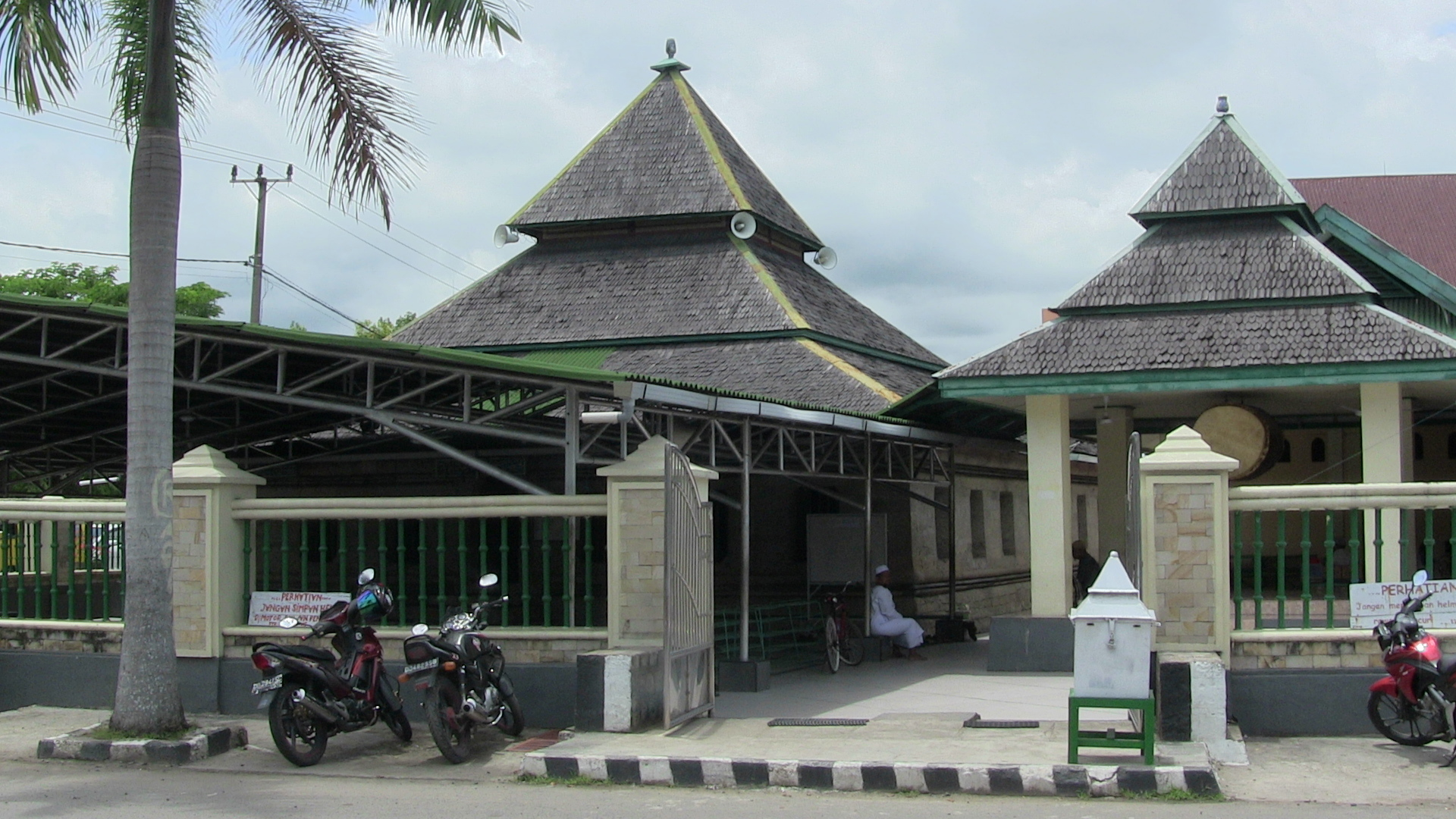

Religion
- Affiliation: Islam
- Branch/tradition: Sunni

Location
- Location: Palopo, South Sulawesi, Indonesia
- Interactive map of Palopo Old Mosque; Masjid Tua Palopo
- Coordinates: 2.994113°S 120.195301°E

Architecture
- Type: Mosque
- Style: Indonesian
- Completed: 1604

Palopo Old Mosque (Indonesian: Masjid Tua Palopo) is a historical mosque in South Sulawesi, Indonesia. Constructed in 1604, the mosque is one of the oldest mosques in the archipelago. The mosque is noted for its unique vernacular architectural style.

== Description ==
Palopo Old Mosque was built in the city of Palopo around 1604 by a scholar from West Sumatra, Datuk Sulaiman who was renowned as Daruk Pattimang. The mosque was constructed during the height of the Kingdom of Luwu, which had embraced Islam, under the rule of Datu Payung Luwu XVI Pati Pasaung Toampanangi, or Sultan Abdullah Matinroe.

Architecturally, it is mostly made of rock and chalk. The main column is made of local wood known as cinna gori. The mosque is also sustained by five pillars which symbolize the Five Pillars of Islam. It mostly retains its original shape, although the mimbar has been refurbished because it was eaten by termites and became fragile. The walls of the mosque reach 94 cm and maintain the fresh air of the interior.
