= PS Hatusela Mamala =

Association football team in Indonesia

- Full name: Persatuan Sepakbola Hatusela Mamala
- Founded: 1980; 46 years ago
- Ground: Mini Hatusela Stadium; Central Maluku, Maluku
- Capacity: 500
- Owner: PSSI Central Maluku
- Manager: Abdulrahim Lilisula
- Coach: Rivai Chang Lestaluhu
- League: Liga 4
- 2019: Eliminated in Liga 3 Regional Round
Home colours	Away colours

Persatuan Sepakbola Hatusela Mamala (simply known as PS Hatusela Mamala) is an Indonesian football club based in Central Maluku Regency, Maluku. They currently competes in Liga 4 Maluku zone.

== Honours ==
- Liga 3 Maluku
  - Champion (1): 2019
