= Gaspa 1958 =

Indonesian football club

- Full name: Gabungan Sepakbola Palopo 1958
- Nickname: Laskar Sawerigading (Sawerigading Warriors)
- Founded: 1958; 68 years ago
- Ground: Lagaligo Stadium; Palopo, South Sulawesi
- Capacity: 10,000
- Owner: Askot PSSI Palopo
- Chairman: Baharman Supri
- Coach: Gafur Syamsu
- League: Liga 4
- 2019: Liga 3, National round, 3rd in Group F
Home colours	Away colours

Gabungan Sepakbola Palopo 1958 (simply known as Gaspa 1958) is an Indonesian football club based in Palopo, South Sulawesi. They currently compete in the Liga 4.

== Honours ==
- Liga 3 South Sulawesi
  - Runner-up: 2019
