= Parit Malintang =

Coordinates: 0°37′S 100°17′E

Parit Malintang is a town or Sub-district in Padang Pariaman Regency, of West Sumatra province of Indonesia and it is the seat (capital) of Padang Pariaman Regency.
