= 2019 Liga 3 Southeast Sulawesi =

Liga 3 Sulawesi Tenggara
- Season: 2019

The 2019 Liga 3 Southeast Sulawesi is the third edition of Liga 3 (formerly known as Liga Nusantara) Southeast Sulawesi as a qualifying round for the national round of 2019 Liga 3. PS Wonua Bombana, winner of the 2018 Liga 3 Southeast Sulawesi are the defending champions. The competition began on 15 August 2019.

== Format ==
In this competition, 14 teams are divided into 4 groups of three or four. The winner will represent Southeast Sulawesi in the national round of 2019 Liga 3.

== Teams ==
There are 14 clubs which will participate the league in this season.

== Group stage ==
This stage started on 15 August 2019.

=== Group A ===
Pos	Team	Pld	W	D	L	GF	GA	GD	Pts	Qualification
1	Galasiswa	0	0	0	0	0	0	0	0	Advance to next round
2	PS Wawonii Putra	0	0	0	0	0	0	0	0	Advance to next round
3	Kendari	0	0	0	0	0	0	0	0	
4	Sultra United	0	0	0	0	0	0	0	0	

Updated to match(es) played on 15 August 2019 (complete). Source: Drawing PSSI Sultra

=== Group B ===
Pos	Team	Pld	W	D	L	GF	GA	GD	Pts	Qualification
1	Amesiu United	0	0	0	0	0	0	0	0	Advance to next round
2	Bola Gotong	0	0	0	0	0	0	0	0	Advance to next round
3	Anoa Kendari	0	0	0	0	0	0	0	0	
4	Tri Elang United	0	0	0	0	0	0	0	0	

Updated to match(es) played on 15 August 2019 (complete). Source: Drawing PSSI Sultra

=== Group C ===
Pos	Team	Pld	W	D	L	GF	GA	GD	Pts	Qualification
1	Persimubar West Muna	0	0	0	0	0	0	0	0	Advance to next round
2	Gasko Kolaka	0	0	0	0	0	0	0	0	Advance to next round
3	Gulamastar Central Buton	0	0	0	0	0	0	0	0	
4	PS Wakatobi	0	0	0	0	0	0	0	0	

Updated to match(es) played on 15 August 2019 (complete). Source: Drawing PSSI Sultra

=== Group D ===
Pos	Team	Pld	W	D	L	GF	GA	GD	Pts	Qualification
1	PS Konut Putra	0	0	0	0	0	0	0	0	Advance to next round
2	Emphank	0	0	0	0	0	0	0	0	Advance to next round
3	PS Wonua Bombana	0	0	0	0	0	0	0	0	

Updated to match(es) played on 15 August 2019 (complete). Source: Drawing PSSI Sultra
