= KS Tiga Naga =

Indonesian football club

- Full name: Klub Sepakbola Tiga Naga
- Nicknames: The Three Dragons; Laskar Lancang Kuning
- Short name: KS3N
- Founded: 2015; 11 years ago
- Ground: Tumpal Sinaga Stadium, Pekanbaru
- Capacity: 10,000
- Owner: Rudi Sinaga
- Manager: Indra Rinaldy
- Coach: Saktiawan Sinaga
- League: Liga 4
- 2021: Liga 2/1st round (Group A), 6th (relegated)
- Website: https://kstiganaga.co.id/
Home colours	Away colours	Third colours

Klub Sepakbola Tiga Naga (also known as KS Tiga Naga) is an Indonesian football club based in Pekanbaru, Riau. Their homebase is Tumpal Sinaga Stadium.

== History ==
They entering 2019 Liga 3 Pre-national Route replacing other club from Riau, AS Abadi, that withdrew from the competition.

On 26 December 2019, Tiga Naga promoted to Liga 2 after won at last match against Persidi Idi in Third Round National Phase and for this season, the club using AS Abadi Tiga Naga (AA Tiga Naga) because KS Tiga Naga already registered on PSSI membership.

== Sponsors ==
=== Kit Sponsors ===
- 2019: Curva Sport
- 2020: Maknorukun
- 2021: Days Apparel

== Stadium ==
Actually, KS Tiga Naga homebase is Tumpal Sinaga Stadium in Pekanbaru. Because the stadium did not qualify the verification for held a matches for Liga 2, they decided to move their homebase to Tuanku Tambusai Stadium in Bangkinang, the capital of Kampar Regency.

== Players ==
=== Current squad ===
Note: Flags indicate national team as defined under FIFA eligibility rules; some limited exceptions apply. Players may hold more than one non-FIFA nationality.

No.	Pos.	Nation	Player
—	GK	IDN	Racmad Hadi
—	DF	IDN	Iwang Pramudya
—	DF	IDN	Ikbal Dalimunthe
—	FW	IDN	Syaifullah Damanik
—	DF	IDN	Deva Ilham
—	MF	IDN	Rayhan Andanti
—	DF	IDN	Bayu Prasetyo
—	DF	IDN	Ardiansyah Siregar
—	MF	IDN	Andrio Tampubolon
—	FW	IDN	Bayu Tri Sanjaya
—	MF	IDN	Angga Abriyanda
—	DF	IDN	Ragil Fahrezi
—	DF	IDN	Muhammad Reza
—	DF	IDN	Khairul Siregar

== Coaching staff ==
Position	Name
Head coach	(Indonesia) Saktiawan Sinaga
Assistant coach	(Indonesia) Rizky Adrian
Fitness coach	(Indonesia) Muhammad Saputra
Goalkeeper coach	(Indonesia) Ewin Nuriaddin
Physioteraphy	(Indonesia) Maulana Habibi
Kitman	(Indonesia) Andria Syahputra

== Season-by-season records ==
Season	League	Tier	Tms.	Pos.	Piala Indonesia
2016	ISC Liga Nusantara	3	32		–
2017	Liga 3	3	32	Eliminated in Provincial round	–
2018	Liga 3	3	32	Eliminated in Provincial round	–
2019	Liga 3	3	32	2nd, Third round	–
2020	Liga 2	2	24	did not finish	–
2021–22	Liga 2	2	24	6th, Group A	–
2022–23	Liga 3	3	season abandoned		–
2023–24	Liga 3	3	80	Eliminated in Provincial round	–
