= PS Duri =

Indonesian football club

- Full name: Persatuan Sepakbola Duri
- Ground: Pokok Jengkol Mini Stadium; Duri, Bengkalis Regency
- Capacity: 5,000
- Owner: Askab PSSI Bengkalis
- Chairman: H. Adri SE
- Manager: Septian Nugraha
- Coach: Ade Candra
- League: Liga 4
- 2021: 3rd in Group C, (Riau zone)
Home colours	Away colours

Persatuan Sepakbola Duri is an Indonesian football club based in Duri, Mandau District, Bengkalis Regency, Riau. They currently compete in the Liga 4.
