= PS Protaba Bantul =

Indonesian football club

Protaba Bantul
- Full name: Persatuan Sepakbola Projotamansari Bantul
- Founded: 2007; 19 years ago
- Ground: Sultan Agung Stadium
- Capacity: 35,000
- Owner: Askab PSSI Bantul
- Manager: Bagus Nur Edy Wijaya
- Coach: Mohammad Ichsan
- League: Liga 3
- 2019: Liga 3, National round, 3rd in Group D
Home colours	Away colours

PS Projotamansari Bantul or PS Protaba is an Indonesian football club based in Bantul Regency, Yogyakarta. Club played in Liga 3. They play their home games at either Sultan Agung Stadium or Dwi Windu Stadium.
