= 2019 Liga 3 South Kalimantan =

Liga 3 Kalimantan Selatan
- Season: 2019
- Champions: Persetala Tanah Laut

The 2019 Liga 3 South Kalimantan is the fifth edition of Liga 3 (formerly known as Liga Nusantara) South Kalimantan as a qualifying round for the national round of 2019 Liga 3. Kotabaru, winner of the 2018 Liga 3 South Kalimantan are the defending champions. The competition began on 21 July 2019.

== Format ==
In this competition, 14 teams are divided into 4 groups of three or four. The two best teams are through to knockout stage. The winner will represent South Kalimantan in the national round of 2019 Liga 3.

== Teams ==
There are 14 clubs which will participate the league in this season.

== Group stage ==
This stage started on 21 July 2019.

=== Group A ===
Pos	Team	Pld	W	D	L	GF	GA	GD	Pts	Qualification
1	Kotabaru (A)	4	3	1	0	7	0	+7	10	Advance to next round
2	Persehan Marabahan (A)	4	1	1	2	3	8	−5	4	Advance to next round
3	Peseban Banjarmasin	4	1	0	3	5	7	−2	3	

Updated to match(es) played on 7 July 2019 (complete). Source: Drawing PSSI Kalsel
(A) Advance to a further round

=== Group B ===
Pos	Team	Pld	W	D	L	GF	GA	GD	Pts	Qualification
1	Persetab Tabalong (A)	6	4	0	2	11	7	+4	12	Advance to next round
2	Gasib Barabai (A)	6	3	2	1	14	5	+9	11	Advance to next round
3	Talenta Banua	6	2	2	2	7	8	−1	8	
4	Persebaru Banjarbaru	6	1	0	5	3	15	−12	3	

Updated to match(es) played on 7 July 2019 (complete). Source: Drawing PSSI Kalsel
(A) Advance to a further round

=== Group C ===
Pos	Team	Pld	W	D	L	GF	GA	GD	Pts	Qualification
1	PS Tapin (A)	4	3	1	0	8	3	+5	10	Advance to next round
2	Persepan Pagatan (A)	4	1	2	1	7	5	+2	5	Advance to next round
3	Barabai	4	0	1	3	3	10	−7	1	

Updated to match(es) played on 7 July 2019 (complete). Source: Drawing PSSI Kalsel
(A) Advance to a further round

=== Group D ===
Pos	Team	Pld	W	D	L	GF	GA	GD	Pts	Qualification
1	Persetala Tanah Laut (A)	6	4	1	1	17	3	+14	13	Advance to next round
2	Perseka Kandangan (A)	6	4	0	2	13	7	+6	12	Advance to next round
3	PS Balangan	6	3	0	3	7	11	−4	9	
4	Persemar Martapura	6	0	1	5	3	19	−16	1	

Updated to match(es) played on 7 July 2019 (complete). Source: Drawing PSSI Kalsel
(A) Advance to a further round

== Knockout stage ==
=== Grup E ===
Pos	Team	Pld	W	D	L	GF	GA	GD	Pts	Qualification
1	Kotabaru (A)	6	5	1	0	10	1	+9	16	Advance to Semi Final
2	Persetala Tanah Laut (A)	6	3	2	1	14	4	+10	11	Advance to Semi Final
3	Persepan Pagatan	5	0	2	3	4	10	−6	2	
4	Gasib Barabai	5	0	1	4	4	17	−13	1	

Updated to match(es) played on 13 Oktober 2019. Source: Klasemen Penyisihan
(A) Advance to a further round

=== Grup F ===
Pos	Team	Pld	W	D	L	GF	GA	GD	Pts	Qualification
1	PS Tapin (A)	4	3	1	0	7	2	+5	10	Advance to Semi Final
2	Persetab Tabalong (A)	4	1	1	2	4	6	−2	4	Advance to Semi Final
3	PS Balangan	4	0	2	2	3	6	−3	2	
4	Perseka Kandangan	0	0	0	0	0	0	0	0	Withdrawn

Updated to match(es) played on 13 Oktober 2019. Source: Klasemen Penyisihan
(A) Advance to a further round
