= Batang Anai F.C. =

Indonesian football club in West Sumatra

Batang Anai
- Full name: Batang Anai Football Club
- Nicknames: Bajak Laut (The Pirates)
- Short name: BAFC
- Founded: 8 July 2017; 9 years ago
- Ground: Bukik Bunian Stadium; Padang Pariaman, West Sumatra
- Capacity: 3,000
- Owner: Askab PSSI Padang Pariaman
- Manager: Suhatri Bur
- Coach: Aminuddin
- League: Liga 4
- 2023–24: 3rd, Group C (West Sumatra zone)
Home colours	Away colours

Batang Anai Football Club (simply known as Batang Anai) is an Indonesian football club based in Padang Pariaman, West Sumatra. They currently compete in the Liga 4 and their homeground is Bukik Bunian Stadium.

== Honours ==
- Liga 3 West Sumatra
  - Champion (1): 2017
  - Runners-up (2): 2018, 2019
