= Galacticos F.C. =

Indonesian football club

Galacticos
- Full name: Galacticos Football Club
- Nickname: Los Galacticos Aceh (Los Galacticos of Aceh)
- Founded: 2010; 16 years ago
- Ground: Galacticos Football Field; Kota Juang, Aceh
- Capacity: 1,000
- Owner: H. Ziaurrahman
- Manager: Juniadi
- Coach: Akhyar Ilyas
- League: Liga 4
- 2021–22: Liga 3, Round of 64 (National)
Home colours	Away colours

Galacticos Football Club (also known as Galacticos Bireuen) is an Indonesian football club based in Kota Juang, Bireuën Regency, Aceh. They currently play in Liga 4.

== Players ==
=== Current squad ===
As of 25 September 2021

Note: Flags indicate national team as defined under FIFA eligibility rules; some limited exceptions apply. Players may hold more than one non-FIFA nationality.

No.	Pos.	Nation	Player
4	DF	IDN	Luis Irsandi
5	DF	IDN	Ilham Mansiz Minarta
6	MF	IDN	Muzakir
9	FW	IDN	Ahmad Afhridzal
10	FW	IDN	Mohammad Arjun
12	MF	IDN	Falian Zuri
13	MF	IDN	Habib Fadrian
14	MF	IDN	Afdhal Zikri
16	DF	IDN	Mohammad Gazi Al Ghifar
18	MF	IDN	Bayu Suwandi
19	DF	IDN	Muhammad Andika
20	GK	IDN	Ferdian Putra
22	MF	IDN	Afdallul Basyar
23	MF	IDN	Muhammad Rizal

No.	Pos.	Nation	Player
24	DF	IDN	Sri Bagus Sandi
26	DF	IDN	Zumardi
27	MF	IDN	Muhammad Nasir
28	DF	IDN	Amirul Akbar
29	GK	IDN	Agus Susanto
31	GK	IDN	Muhammad Reza
33	DF	IDN	Muhammad Ridha
45	MF	IDN	Muhammad Rizki
77	MF	IDN	Ziaurrahman
87	FW	IDN	Muzakir
91	MF	IDN	Zulfikar
92	MF	IDN	Okka Dwi Syahputra
97	MF	IDN	Muhammad Khadafi
99	MF	IDN	Rahmad Rizki

== Honours ==
- Liga 3 Aceh
  - Runner-up (1): 2021
- Liga 3 National
  - Round of 64 (1): 2021–22
