= PS Nene Mallomo =

Association football team in Indonesia

- Full name: Persatuan Sepakbola Nene Mallomo
- Nicknames: Laskar Ganggawa; Laskar Nene' Mallomo
- Short name: NeMal
- Founded: 1990; 36 years ago, as Perssidrap; 2015; 11 years ago, as Sidrap United; 2019; 7 years ago, as PS Nene Mallomo
- Ground: Ganggawa Stadium; Sidenreng Rappang, South Sulawesi
- Capacity: 5,000
- Owner: Askab PSSI Sidenreng Rappang
- Chairman: Dollah Mando
- Manager: H. Landadi
- Coach: Faisal Sinampe
- League: Liga 4
- 2021: 6th, (South Sulawesi zone)
Home colours	Away colours

Persatuan Sepakbola Nene Mallomo (simply known as PS Nene Mallomo) is an Indonesian football club based in Sidenreng Rappang Regency, South Sulawesi. They currently compete in the Liga 4.

== Honours ==
- Liga 3 South Sulawesi
  - Champion: 2017
  - Third-place: 2019
