= Pestu Tojo Una-Una =

Association football team in Indonesia

Pestu Ampana
- Full name: Persatuan Sepakbola Tojo Una-Una
- Nickname: Laskar Sivia Patuju
- Founded: 1963; 63 years ago
- Ground: Stamina Field; Ampana, Tojo Una-Una Regency, Central Sulawesi
- Owner: PSSI Tojo Una-Una
- Chairman: Ramli Thalib
- Coach: Irwan Rusli Samsia
- League: Liga 4
- 2021: 7th in Group B, (Liga 3 Central Sulawesi zone)
Home colours	Away colours

Persatuan Sepakbola Tojo Una-Una, also known as Pestu Ampana, is an Indonesian football club based in Ampana, Tojo Una-Una Regency, Central Sulawesi. They currently play at Liga 4.

== Honours ==
- Liga 3 Central Sulawesi
  - Champion (1): 2019
