= Tahuna F.C. =

Association football team in Indonesia

Tahuna FC
- Full name: Tahuna Football Club
- Nickname: Laskar Bininta
- Short name: TFC
- Founded: 2014; 12 years ago
- Ground: Gesit Tahuna Stadium; Tahuna, Sangihe Islands, North Sulawesi
- Capacity: 1,000
- Owner: Askab PSSI Kabupaten Kepulauan Sangihe
- Chairman: Gideon Longkutoy
- Coach: Eduard Heriyanto
- League: Liga 4
- 2021: 2nd, (North Sulawesi zone)
Home colours	Away colours

Tahuna Football Club (simply known as Tahuna FC) is an Indonesian football club based in Tahuna, Sangihe Islands Regency, North Sulawesi. They currently compete in the Liga 4.

== Honours ==
- Liga 3 North Sulawesi
  - Runner-up: 2021
