= SEL 50 Kota F.C. =

Indonesian football club

SEL 50 Kota
- Full name: Solok Equator Luak 50 Kota Football Club
- Nickname: Pandeka Gunuang Talang
- Founded: 2017; 9 years ago, as Solok FC; 2019; 7 years ago, as SEL 50 Kota
- Ground: Singa Harau Stadium
- Capacity: 5,000
- Owner: Verry Mulyadi
- Manager: Yuhendri
- Coach: Alexaldha Yudi
- League: Liga 4
- 2018: Liga 3, Round of 16 (National)
Home colours	Away colours

Solok Equator Luak 50 Kota Football Club (simply known as SEL 50 Kota) is an Indonesian football club based in Lima Puluh Kota Regency, West Sumatra. They currently compete in the Liga 4 and their homebase is Singo Harau Stadium. They formed after the Liga 3 club from Solok, Solok Football Club, merging with local club from Lima Puluh Kota, Equator Luak 50 Kota.
