= Bontang City F.C. =

Indonesian football club

Bontang City
- Full name: Bontang City Football Club
- Nickname: Pasukan Kota Taman
- Founded: 2018; 8 years ago
- Ground: Taman Prestasi Stadium
- Capacity: 25,000
- Owner: Askot PSSI Bontang
- Manager: Nurkhalid
- Coach: Bagus Prabowo
- League: Liga 4
- 2021: Semi-finals, (East Kalimantan zone)
Home colours	Away colours

Bontang City Football Club is an Indonesian football club based in the Bontang, East Kalimantan, Indonesia. This team currently competes in Liga 4 East Kalimantan zone.

== Honours ==
- Liga 3 East Kalimantan
  - Champion: 2019
  - Runner-up: 2018
