= Persibabar West Bangka =

Indonesian football club

Persibabar
- Full name: Persatuan Sepakbola Indonesia Bangka Barat
- Nicknames: Angin Barat; Laskar Bumi Sejiran
- Founded: 2003; 23 years ago
- Ground: Bina Jaya Stadium; Muntok, West Bangka
- Owner: Askab PSSI Bangka Barat
- Chairman: Ust. Zuhri M. Syazali
- Coach: Tjen Min Hean
- League: Liga 4
- 2021: Quarter-finals (Liga 3 Bangka Belitung Islands zone)
Home colours	Away colours

Persatuan Sepakbola Indonesia Bangka Barat (simply known as Persibabar) is an Indonesian football club based in Muntok, West Bangka Regency, Bangka Belitung Islands. They currently compete in Liga 4 Bangka Belitung Islands zone.

== Honours ==
- Liga 3 Bangka Belitung Islands
  - Champion (1): 2019
