= Palopo =

City in South Sulawesi, Indonesia

- City
- City of Palopo; Kota Palopo
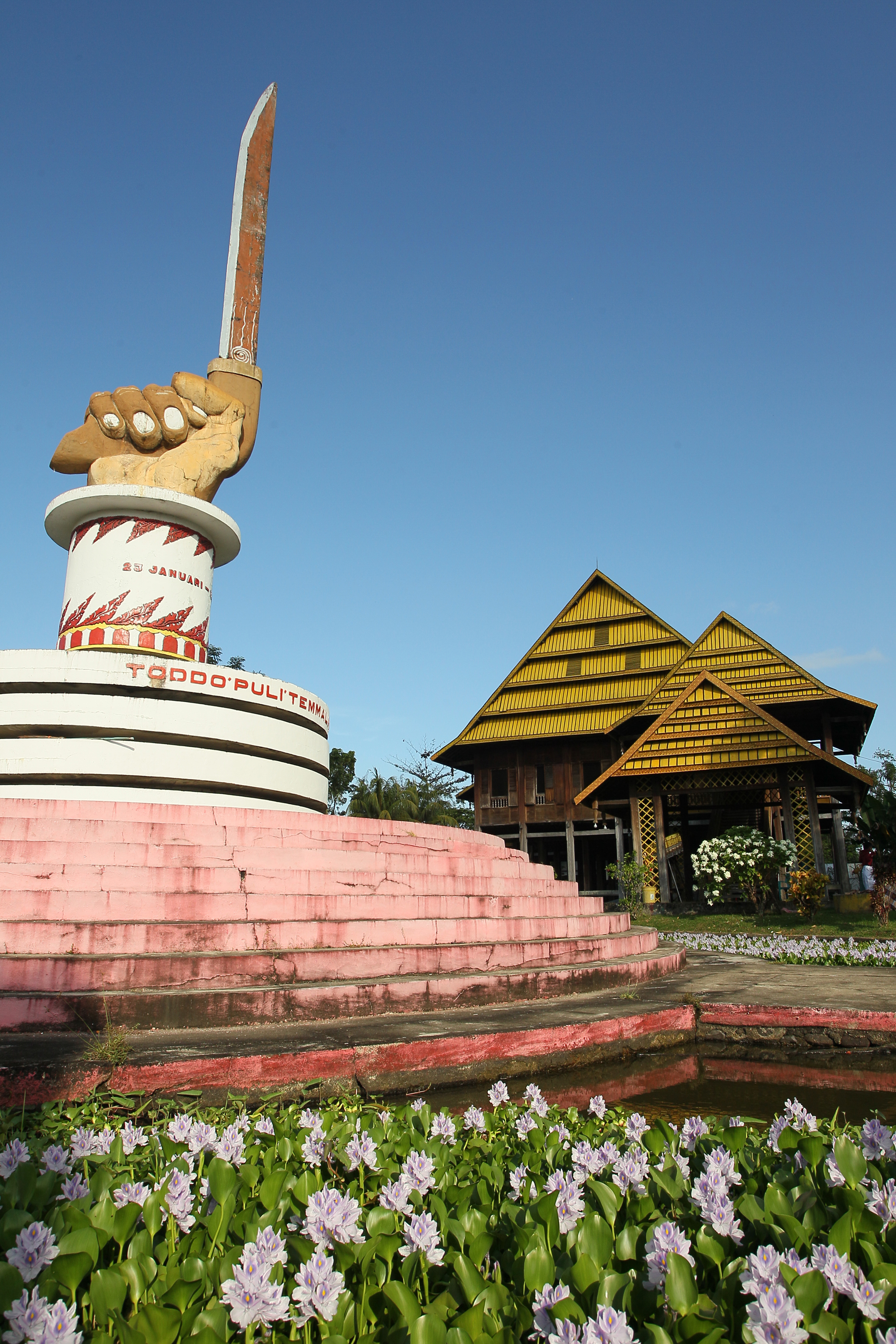
- Palace of Luwu Kingdom

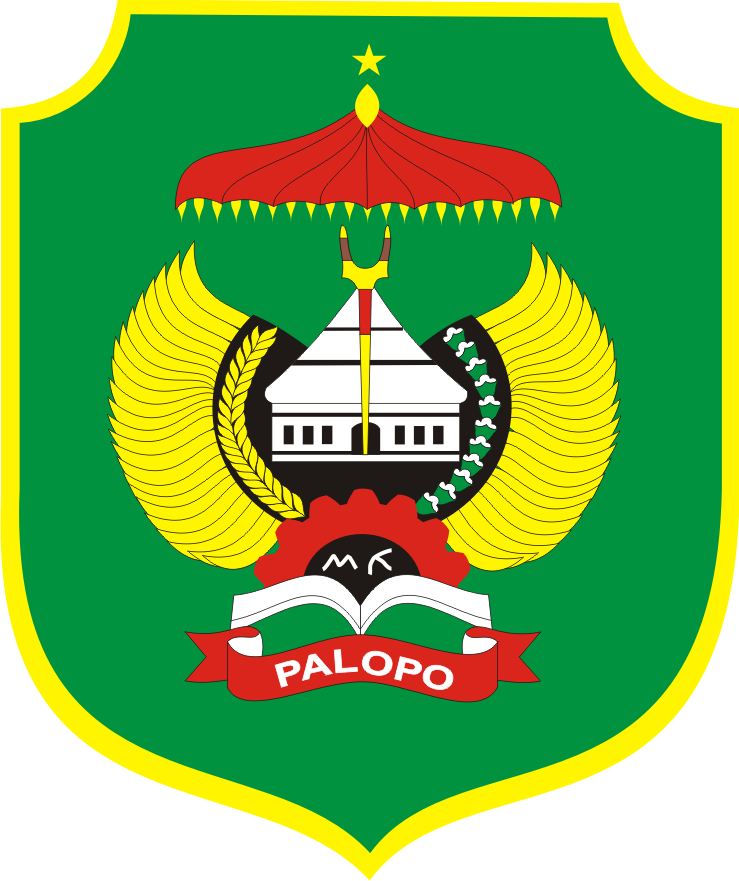
- Coat of arms
- Motto: IDAMAN (Indah (Beautiful), Damai (Safe), Nyaman (Pleasant))
- Location within South Sulawesi
- Interactive map of Palopo
- Location in Sulawesi and Indonesia Palopo (Indonesia)
- Coordinates: 3°0′S 120°12′E
- Country: Indonesia
- Province: South Sulawesi
- Founded: c. 1620
- City Status: 14 July 2002

Government
  - Mayor: Naili Trisal
  - Vice Mayor: Akhmad Syarifuddin

Area
  - City: 273.23 km^{2} (105.49 sq mi)
  - Metro: 1 km^{2} (0.39 sq mi)

Population (mid 2025 estimate)
  - City: 184,961
  - Density: 676.94/km^{2} (1,753.3/sq mi)
- Time zone: UTC+8 (Indonesia Central Time)
- Area code: (+62) 471
- Website: palopokota.go.id

Palopo or Kota Palopo (Palopo city) is a city located in South Sulawesi, Indonesia, and the second-largest city in the province. Until it acquired its city autonomy on 10 April 2002, Palopo was the capital of Luwu Regency. The land area of the city is 273.23 km^{2}, and it had a population of 148,033 at the 2010 Census and 184,681 at the 2020 Census, comprising 92,444 males and 92,237 females. The official estimate as at mid 2022 was 190,867 (comprising 95,562 males and 95,305 females), but the mid 2025 official estimate showed a sizeable return to 184,961 (comprising 92,653 males and 92,308 females).

== History ==
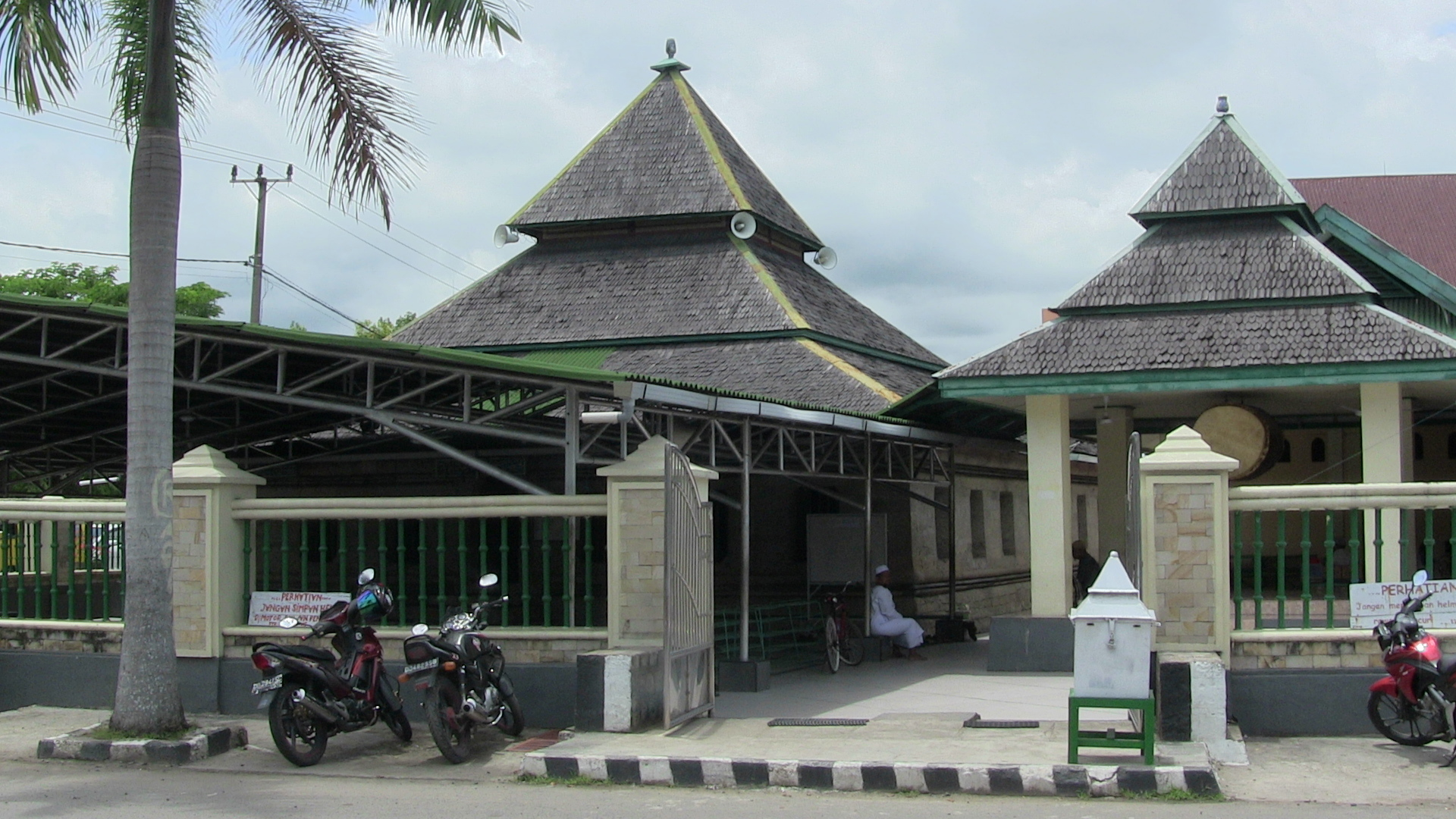
17th-century Palopo Old Mosque is one of the oldest mosques in Indonesia.

Palopo was founded c. 1620, probably under the second Muslim ruler of Luwu Kingdom, Sultan Abdullah Muhiddin, who is buried at Malangke, the former palace centre of Luwu. His momental grave, which was carved with Majapahit-style floral decorations, was destroyed by Kahar Muzakkar rebels in the 1950s: nothing today remains except the location. The advantage of Palopo over the former palace centre was the potential for trade with the Toraja-speaking Seko-Rongkong valleys. The town sits at the foot of a steep, winding pass which leads into the highland regions. In the late 19th century this trade consisted primarily of coffee and slaves. Gold panned from upland rivers may also have been an attraction. Dammar was an important export in the later period.

Little is known of Palopo before the Dutch annexation of South Sulawesi in 1905. The only Western visitor to have left an account of the town was James Brooke (later Rajah of Sarawak), who described it in the 1830s as 'a miserable town, consisting of about 300 houses, scattered and dilapidated'. It is the location of the Palopo Old Mosque, South Sulawesi's oldest mosque. Built from blocks of white coral, with a three-tiered roof representing the ancient Austronesian cosmos, the Mesjid Jami' is said to have been built during the reign of Sultan Abdullah. It has a 19th-century dedicatory inscription behind one of its doors, presumably reflecting a restoration. The royal graveyard lies to the north at Lokkoe and contains pyramidical stone mausolea in which lie the remains of Luwu's 17th to 20th-century rulers.

== Administrative division ==
Palopo City is divided into nine Districts (Kecamatan), tabulated below with their areas and their populations at the 2010 Census and the 2020 Census, together with the official estimates as of mid 2025. The table also includes the locations of the district administrative centres, the number of urban subdistricts (kelurahan) in each district, and its post code.

Kode Wilayah	Name of District (kecamatan)	Area in km^{2}	Pop'n Census 2010	Pop'n Census 2020	Pop'n Estimate mid 2025	Admin centre	No. of kelurahan	Post code(s)
73.73.03	Wara Selatan (South Wara)	11.04	10,124	18,679	20,734	Songka	4	91959 ^{(a)}
73.73.07	Sendana	43.25	5,732	7,381	8,226	Sendana	4	91959 ^{(b)}
73.73.01	Wara	4.42	31,024	31,539	29,630	Dangerakko	6	91921 - 91923
73.73.05	Wara Timur (East Wara)	6.09	30,997	38,344	38,217	Malatunrung	7	91921
73.73.08	Mungkajang	37.89	6,981	10,062	9,965	Mungkajang	4	91924 - 91925
73.73.02	Wara Utara (North Wara)	5.59	19,011	20,645	20,079	Salubulo	6	91911 - 91914
73.73.09	Bara	22.98	22,959	30,660	29,770	Temmalebba	5	91914
73.73.04	Telluwanua	40.33	11,701	15,887	17,231	Maroangin	7	91958
73.73.06	Wara Barat (West Wara)	101.64	9,403	11,484	11,109	Tomarundung	5	91921 ^{(c)}
	Totals	273.23	148,033	184,681	184,961		48	

Notes: (a) except for the kelurahan of Takkalala, which has a post code of 91926. (b) except for the kelurahan of Mawa, which has a post code of 91925. (c) except for the kelurahan of Battang, which has a post code of 91958.

== Climate ==
Palopo has a tropical rainforest climate (Af) with heavy rainfall year-round.

Climate data for Palopo
Month	Jan	Feb	Mar	Apr	May	Jun	Jul	Aug	Sep	Oct	Nov	Dec	Year
Mean daily maximum °C (°F)	30.4 (86.7)	30.5 (86.9)	30.7 (87.3)	31.0 (87.8)	31.0 (87.8)	30.3 (86.5)	30.0 (86.0)	30.9 (87.6)	31.4 (88.5)	32.3 (90.1)	31.7 (89.1)	30.8 (87.4)	30.9 (87.6)
Daily mean °C (°F)	26.8 (80.2)	26.8 (80.2)	26.9 (80.4)	27.1 (80.8)	27.3 (81.1)	26.5 (79.7)	25.9 (78.6)	26.4 (79.5)	26.8 (80.2)	27.6 (81.7)	27.5 (81.5)	27.0 (80.6)	26.9 (80.4)
Mean daily minimum °C (°F)	23.2 (73.8)	23.2 (73.8)	23.2 (73.8)	23.3 (73.9)	23.6 (74.5)	22.8 (73.0)	21.9 (71.4)	22.0 (71.6)	22.2 (72.0)	22.9 (73.2)	23.3 (73.9)	23.3 (73.9)	22.9 (73.2)
Average rainfall mm (inches)	177 (7.0)	223 (8.8)	234 (9.2)	294 (11.6)	322 (12.7)	206 (8.1)	172 (6.8)	180 (7.1)	161 (6.3)	158 (6.2)	191 (7.5)	232 (9.1)	2,550 (100.4)
Source: Climate-Data.org
