= Tulungagung Regency =

Regency in East Java, Indonesia

Tulungagung Regency Kabupaten Tulungagung
- Regency

Other transcription(s)
  - Javanese: Tulung-agung (Gêdrig) تولوڠ أڮوڠ (Pégon) ꦠꦸꦭꦸꦁꦲꦒꦸꦁ (Hånåcåråkå)
- Coat of arms
- Nickname: Kota Marmer (Marble City)
- Motto: Bersinar (abbreviation: Bersih, Indah, dan Menarik) (English: Clean, Beautiful, and Interesting)
- Interactive map of Tulungagung Regency
- Coordinates: 8°4′0″S 111°54′0″E
- Country: Indonesia
- Province: East Java
- Capital: Tulungagung
- Establishment Date: 18 November 1205

Government
  - Type: Regency
  - Regent: Gatut Sunu Wibowo
  - Vice Regent: Ahmad Baharudin

Area
  - Total: 1,144.86 km^{2} (442.03 sq mi)
- Elevation: 85 m (279 ft)
- Highest elevation: 2,563 m (8,409 ft)
- Lowest elevation: 0 m (0 ft)

Population (mid 2025 estimate)
  - Total: 1,141,079
  - Density: 996.697/km^{2} (2,581.43/sq mi)
- Time zone: UTC+7 (Western Indonesia Time)
- Website: tulungagung.go.id

Tulungagung Regency (pronounced [tulʊŋaɡʊŋ]) is a regency (kabupaten) of East Java Province, Indonesia. It covers an area of 1,144.856 km^{2} and had a population of 990,159 at the 2010 Census and 1,089,775 at the 2020 Census; the official estimate as of mid 2025 was 1,141,079. The administrative headquarters is in the town of Tulungagung.

== Etymology ==
Previously, Tulungagung was only a small area located where the center of the town is situated now; that area was named Tulungagung - in the Old Javanese language, tulung means help, and agung means Almighty. It was based on how it used to flood everywhere and people would pray to God so that it wouldn't flood, thus forming the name "tulungagung". The larger area is called Ngrowo. Ngrowo was still used as the name of Tulungagung until the 20th century when the administrative centre's location was moved from Kalangbret to Tulungagung.

== History ==
In 1205, the Thani Lawadan community living in the southern part of Tulungagung received an honor from the last king of Daha, Kertajaya, for their loyalty to the king when there was a siege from the enemy coming from the east of Daha. That honor then was written into an ancient inscription namely Prasasti Lawadan marked as "Sukra Suklapada Mangga Siramasa" which describes the date of November 18, 1205, the date when it was made. That date has been officially used as the establishment date of Tulungagung since 2003.

In Boyolangu Village (Boyolangu district), there is Gayatri Temple, a temple which also a mausoleum for Gayatri (Sri Rajapatni), the fourth wife of the first Majapahit King, Raden Wijaya (Kertarajasa Jayawardhana), who also the mother of the third Majapahit Queen, Sri Gitarja (Tribhuwana Wijayatunggadewi). Sri Rajapatni was the grandmother of the greatest Majapahit Emperor, Hayam Wuruk (Rajasanegara), who ruled Majapahit in its golden period with the support of his prime minister Gadjah Mada. The name of Boyolangu is shown in Nagarakertagama as a sacred place for Gayatri.

== Geography ==
Tulungagung Regency is located 154 km (96 mi) southwest of Surabaya, the capital city of East Java Province. The other regencies and areas surrounding Tulungagung Regency are:

- North : Kediri Regency
- South : Indian Ocean
- East : Blitar Regency
- West : Trenggalek Regency

Topographically, Tulungagung Regency is located 85 m (279 ft) above the sea level. The northwest part of the regency is a portion of the Wilis-Liman mountain range; the central part is lowland; the southern part is a portion of the rocky Kapur Kidul mountain range which is also an enormous source of marble. In the northwest part of Tulungagung Regency, specifically in Sendang District, there is Mount Wilis (2,563 m or 8,409 ft), the highest point in Tulungagung Regency.

In the administrative capital of Tulungagung town, there is the Ngrowo River, a tributary of the Brantas River, and it divides the town of Tulungagung into northern and southern parts. Boyolangu, Tulungagung and Kedungwaru Districts together form a highly urbanised centre for the regency, occupying 81.85 km^{2} with 250,220 inhabitants in mid 2025, with parts of Tulungagung district being exclaves within the other two districts.

== Administrative districts ==
Tulungagung Regency is divided into nineteen districts (kecamatan), tabulated below with their areas and their population totals from the 2010 Census and the 2020 Census, together with the official estimates as of mid 2025. The table also includes the locations of the district administrative centres, the number of administrative villages in each district (totaling 257 rural desa and 14 urban kelurahan - the latter all in Tulungagung (town) District), and its postal codes.

Kode; Wilayah	Name of District (kecamatan)	Area in km^{2}	Pop'n; Census; 2010	Pop'n; Census; 2020	Pop'n; Estimate mid 2025	Admin centre	No. of villages	Post codes
35.04.15	Besuki ^{(a)}	82.16	33,900	38,098	40,232	Besuki	10	66275
35.04.17	Bandung	41.96	42,216	47,761	50,335	Bandung	18	66274
35.04.18	Pakel	36.06	47,873	53,170	56,629	Pakel	19	66273
35.04.16	Campurdarat	39.56	53,755	57,432	60,345	Campurdarat	9	66272
35.04.19	Tanggunggunung	117.73	23,343	25,792	27,243	Tanggunggunung	7	66283
35.04.14	Kalidawir	97.81	63,541	74,309	78,757	Karangtalun	17	66281
35.04.12	Pucanglaban	82.94	21,883	25,812	27,344	Pucanglaban	9	66284
35.04.13	Rejotangan ^{(b)}	66.49	70,262	80,440	84,343	Rejotangan	16	66293
35.04.11	Ngunut	37.70	74,949	82,614	85,377	Ngunut	18	66292
35.04.10	Sumbergempol	39.28	63,761	71,164	75,866	Sumberdadi	17	66291
35.04.02	Boyolangu	38.44	76,499	83,281	87,310	Boyolangu	17	66231 - 66235
35.04.01	Tulungagung	13.67	65,123	65,952	66,718	Tamanan	14 ^{(c)}	66212 - 66219
35.04.03	Kedungwaru	29.74	85,389	94,430	96,520	Ketanon	19	66221 - 66229
35.04.04	Ngantru	37.03	52,276	57,332	60,192	Ngantru	13	66252
35.04.08	Karangrejo	35.54	39,038	43,439	45,565	Karangrejo	13	66253
35.04.05	Kauman	30.84	49,087	51,776	53,348	Kauman	13	66261
35.04.09	Gondang	44.02	53,999	58,671	61,072	Gondang	20	66263
35.04.06	Pagerwojo	88.22	30,018	31,396	33,694	Mulyosari	11	66262
35.04.07	Sendang	96.46	43,246	46,906	50,189	Sendang	11	66254
	Totals - Regency	1,144.86	990,158	1,089,775	1,141,079	Tulungagung	271	

Notes: (a) including 19 small offshore islands. (b) Rejotangan District forms a salient stretching east into Blitar Regency.
(c) all 14 are classed as urban kelurahan - Bago, Botoran, Jepun, Kampungdalem, Karangwaru, Kauman, Kedungsoko, Kenayan, Kepatihan, Kutoanyar, Panggungrejo, Sembung, Tamanan and Tertek.

== Climate ==
Tulungagung has a tropical savanna climate (Aw) with moderate to little rainfall from May to October and heavy rainfall from November to April.

Climate data for Tulungagung
Month	Jan	Feb	Mar	Apr	May	Jun	Jul	Aug	Sep	Oct	Nov	Dec	Year
Mean daily maximum °C (°F)	29.5 (85.1)	29.6 (85.3)	29.8 (85.6)	30.5 (86.9)	30.5 (86.9)	30.6 (87.1)	30.5 (86.9)	30.9 (87.6)	31.8 (89.2)	31.8 (89.2)	30.9 (87.6)	30.0 (86.0)	30.5 (87.0)
Daily mean °C (°F)	25.5 (77.9)	25.5 (77.9)	25.6 (78.1)	26.0 (78.8)	25.6 (78.1)	25.2 (77.4)	24.8 (76.6)	24.9 (76.8)	25.8 (78.4)	26.1 (79.0)	25.9 (78.6)	25.6 (78.1)	25.5 (78.0)
Mean daily minimum °C (°F)	21.5 (70.7)	21.5 (70.7)	21.5 (70.7)	21.5 (70.7)	20.8 (69.4)	19.9 (67.8)	19.1 (66.4)	19.0 (66.2)	19.8 (67.6)	20.5 (68.9)	21.0 (69.8)	21.3 (70.3)	20.6 (69.1)
Average rainfall mm (inches)	280 (11.0)	265 (10.4)	246 (9.7)	184 (7.2)	111 (4.4)	65 (2.6)	53 (2.1)	19 (0.7)	24 (0.9)	76 (3.0)	153 (6.0)	241 (9.5)	1,717 (67.5)
Source: Climate-Data.org

The Tulungagung Regency government is led by Dr. Heru Suseno, S.TP., MT. since 25 September 2023 as the regent.

== Industries ==
Tulungagung is a major producer of marble slabs and marble handicraft product. It is the largest marble supply regencies in the southern part of East Java. In 1995, Tulungagung contributed over 33,800 m^{2} of marble through two companies. Today, we can visit many home-based marble craft workshops in Campurdarat District. Many of these small shops support local artisans and the local economy. Beside marble craft workshops, tourists can find small and medium enterprises that focus on manufacturing housewares such as door mats and brooms made of natural coconut husks, recycled fabrics or other natural materials in Plosokandang (Kedungwaru District). Furthermore, hand-painted batik and ready-to-wear batik sewing workshops can be found scattered in some parts of the city. In Ngunut District travelers can find knapsack, belt, and traditional fried snack industries. Two of the popular snacks are kacang Shanghai (individual peanut rolled in garlic-seasoned flour batter and slow-roasted on pan) and kacang telor (individual peanut rolled in spice-seasoned egg flour batter, slow-roasted on pan).
