= Padang Pariaman Regency =

Regency in West Sumatra, Indonesia

Padang Pariaman Regency Kabupaten Padang Pariaman (Minangkabau)
- Regency
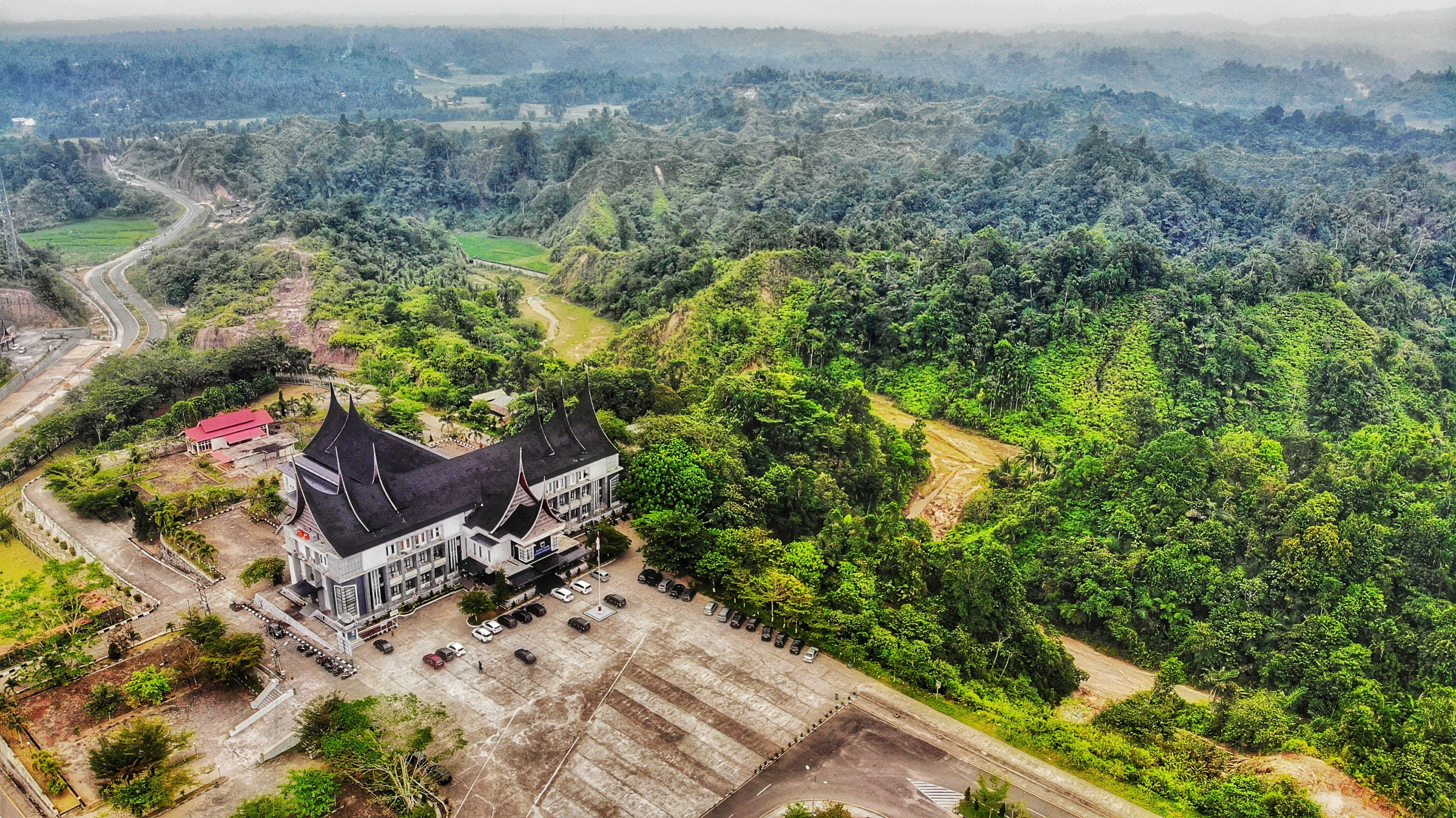
- Regent's office

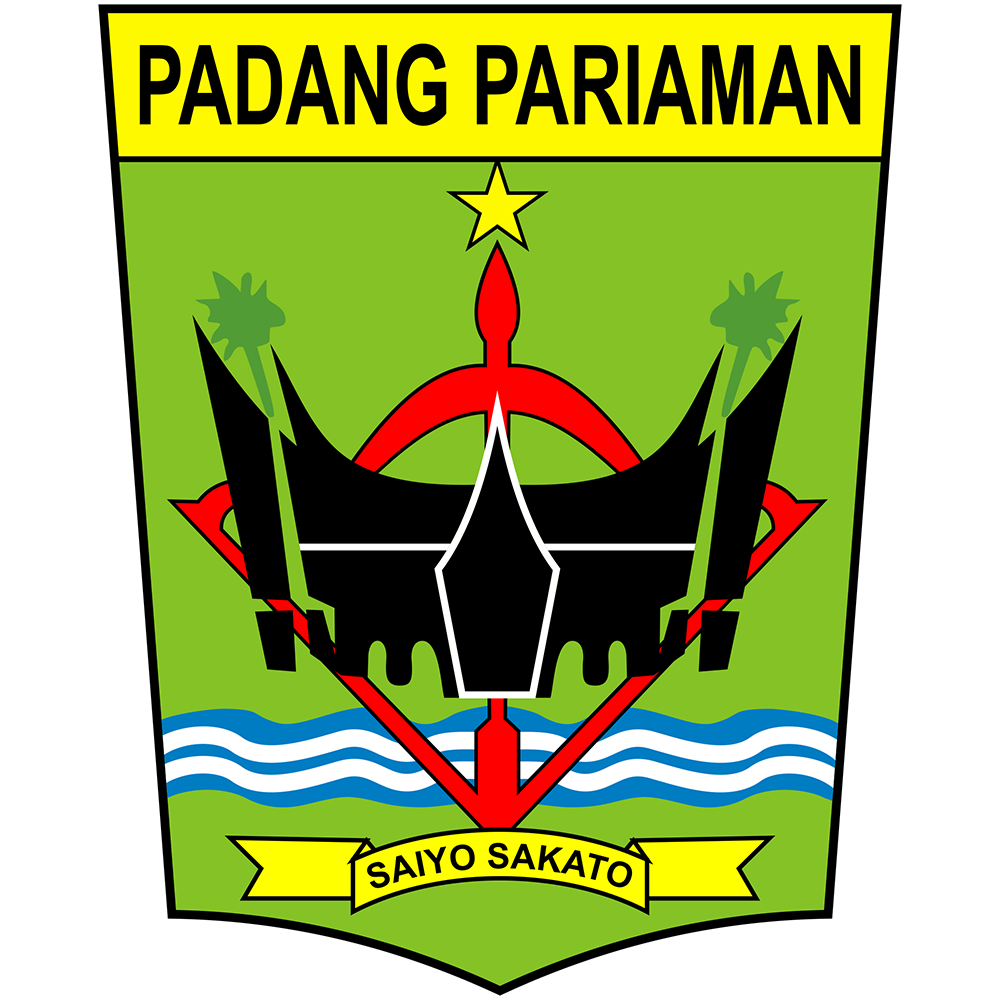
- Coat of arms
- Motto: Saiyo Sakato (Agree together, one voice together)
- Location within West Sumatra

- Location in Sumatra and Indonesia Padang Pariaman Regency (Indonesia)
- Coordinates: 0.633333°S 100.117°E
- Country: Indonesia
- Province: West Sumatra
- Regency seat: Parit Malintang

Government
  - Regent: John Kenedy Azis
  - Vice Regent: Rahmat Hidayat

Area
  - Total: 1,343.56 km^{2} (518.75 sq mi)

Population (mid 2025 estimate)
  - Total: 467,040
  - Density: 347.61/km^{2} (900.32/sq mi)
- Time zone: UTC+7 (IWST)
- Area code: (+62) 751
- Website: padangpariamankab.go.id

Padang Pariaman Regency is a regency (kabupaten) of West Sumatra, Indonesia. It has an area of 1,343.58 km^{2}, and it had a population of 390,204 at the 2010 census and 430,626 at the 2020 census; the official estimate as of mid 2025 was 467,040 (comprising 234,860 males and 232,180 females). The regency seat is at the town of Parit Malintang. West Sumatra's capital and biggest city, Padang, is surrounded on the landward side by this regency, which includes suburbs of the city.

== Administrative districts ==
The regency is divided into seventeen districts (kecamatan), tabulated below with their areas and their populations at the 2010 census and the 2020 census, together with the official estimates as of mid 2025. The table also includes the locations of the district administrative centres, the number of administrative villages (nagari) in each district, and its post code.

Name of District (kecamatan)	Area in km^{2}	Pop'n census 2010	Pop'n census 2020	Pop'n estimate mid 2025	Admin centre	No. of villages	Post code
Batang Anai	164.33	44,013	52,844	59,680	Pasar Usang	8	25586
Lubuak Aluang	124.76	42,614	46,895	50,850	Lubuak Aluang	9	25581
Sintuak Toboh Gadang	32.65	17,710	19,268	20,660	Sintuak	5	25582
Ulakan Tapakis	23.01	18,910	20,652	22,400	Ulakan	8	25572
Nan Sabaris	66.19	26,730	30,035	32,880	Pauah Kamba	9	25571
2 x 11 Anam Lingkuang	40.64	18,114	18,736	19,620	Sicincin	3	25584
Anam Lingkuang	34.28	18,845	20,609	22,170	Pakandangan	5	25583
2 x 11 Kayu Tanam	188.55	25,558	28,051	30,360	Kayu Tanam	4	25585
VII Koto (Sungai Sariak)	64.14	33,595	35,524	37,780	Sungai Sariak	12	25576
VII Koto Patamuan	77.95	15,592	17,481	19,050	Tandikek	6	25574
VII Koto Padang Sago	34.93	7,940	8,674	9,310	Padang Sago	6	25573
V Koto (Kampuang Dalam)	66.68	22,523	23,690	25,180	Kampuang Dalam	8	25552
V Koto Timur	66.79	14,182	14,450	15,080	Kudu Gantiang	4	25575
Sungai Limau	90.36	27,781	29,774	31,940	Sungai Limau	4	25561
Batang Gasan	76.26	10,483	10,949	11,600	Gasan Gadang	3	25563
Sungai Garinggiang	107.73	29,009	32,021	36,000	Singai Garinggiang	4	25562
IV Koto Aur Malintang	84.29	17,457	20,973	22,490	Batu Basa	5	25564
Totals	1,343.58	391,056	430,626	467,040	Parik Malintang	103	

== Geography ==
Padang Pariaman Regency lies between 0 ° 11 '- 0 ° 49' south latitude and 98 ° 36 '- 100 ° 28' east longitude, with a total area of about 1,343.09 km^{2} and a coastline length of 60.50 km. The regency's land area is equivalent to 3.15 percent of the total land area of West Sumatra Province.

Temperatures ranged between 24.4 °C - 25.7 °C, so for the average maximum temperature of 31.08 °C and average minimum temperature of 21.34 °C, with 86.75% relative humidity. Average rainfall for the district overall Pariaman in 2007 amounted to 368.4 mm, with an average days of rain as much as 19 days per month and the average wind speed is 2:14 knots / hour.

West Sumatra Province is a mountainous district nearly 3,000 metres in elevation made of Paleozoic sedimentary rock and Igneous rock that extends from the active row of volcanoes to the east. The Great Sumatran Fault divides the center of the province—the fault topography clearly visible—in a North-northwest to South-southeast direction. The stretch of land between the central mountain range and the shore is made of volcanic uplands and pyroclastic flow uplands with a narrow coastal plain distributed along the seacoast.

Towering above the eastern side (i.e. the mountain side) of Padang Pariaman are two large volcanoes; Gunung Tandikat stands at 2,347m and Gunung Singalang at 2,877m, together forming twin volcanoes. Lake Maninjau, located at the north end of Padang Pariaman, is a caldera lake measuring 20 kilometres north–south and 8 kilometres east–west which formed after a large volcanic burst 52,000 years ago. The volcanic products from this giant eruption are scattered over a wide area in the north-central area of Padang Pariaman. Today these volcanic products are seen as pyroclastic flow uplands and low relief hills.

== Earthquakes ==
Recent earthquakes that occurred along the Great Sumatran Fault that cuts across Sumatra are the series of quakes of 6 March 2007 measuring Mw6.4 and the Mw6.3 earthquake in the vicinity of Singkarak lake, which occurred in eastern Kabupaten Padang Pariaman.
