= Phoenix club (sports) =

Sports club replacing failed predecessor

The term phoenix club is used in professional team sports to refer to a new entity that is set up to replace the same club that has failed in business terms but not necessarily in sporting terms, and generally involves the continuation of the sporting activity. In some cases, the phoenix club is created by the supporters of the club which has ended, or seems to be on the point of ending. A phoenix club will often have a very similar (although, for legal reasons, not identical) name and logo to the original club, and will also use a similar playing kit. The term is particularly prevalent in the United Kingdom and Italy in relation to association football, although it is also used in other countries.

The term has also been used to refer to a club formed by supporters of a major team when a change of ownership or policy causes them to lose faith in the management of their favoured side. This happened in 2005, when F.C. United of Manchester was formed by some fans of Manchester United F.C., specifically as a protest at the sale of the latter to Malcolm Glazer, and at what they saw as the excessive and unacceptable commercialisation of the club, although the new club's status as a phoenix is open to dispute on the basis that the original club still exists.

The term is derived from the mythical phoenix, a bird which was said to resurrect itself from its own ashes. In at least one case, the name of a phoenix club has played on the term itself: in the Australia-New Zealand A-League, now known as A-League Men, the defunct New Zealand Knights were replaced by new club Wellington Phoenix FC.

In some cases, phoenix clubs retain the name of the club which they replaced, implying a continuation from the former team. In other cases, name changes occur, perhaps due to proprietorial ownership of the old club's name.

An essential element of a phoenix club is that it is a legally separate entity from the original. A counter example is the American football Cleveland Browns, the football organization of which moved to Baltimore in 1995 to become the Baltimore Ravens. The NFL stipulated that, as a condition of allowing the move, the Ravens would have to relinquish any claim to the history and records of the Browns, one of the twelve "old guard" NFL franchises. As such, the Ravens technically entered the NFL as an expansion team. While the Browns franchise was deemed to have "suspended operations" for three years, in 1999 it was sold to new ownership and was recognized by the league to own all of the pre-1996 Browns' history, even though the extant Ravens had acquired the contracts of that team's players and personnel. The league and club thus recognize the Browns as one single team, albeit with a sporting hiatus, making the Browns not a phoenix club.

Because there is no single, universally-accepted definition, ascribing the term phoenix club can be disputed depending on the criteria used. Furthermore, there may be changes in what each country's football governing body and legal system defines as a phoenix club rather than resurrected club.

== Multisports club ==
=== Greece ===
Original club	Operating period	Source	1st Phoenix club	Operating period	Source
G.S. Iraklis Thessalonikis	1908–2022		N.G.S. Iraklis Thessalonikis 1908	2020–present	

== Association football ==
=== Two countries ===
Original club	1st Phoenix club	Year established
SC Tavriya Simferopol	FC TSK Simferopol*^{a}	2014

- ^{a} A club was founded in Russia following the 2014 Russian annexation of Crimea.

=== Austria ===
Original club	1st Phoenix club	Year established
FC Swarovski Tirol	FC Tirol Innsbruck	1993
1. FC Vöcklabruck	Vöcklabrucker SC	2009
SV Austria Salzburg	SV Austria Salzburg	2005
Hakoah Vienna	SC Maccabi Wien	2010
FC Wacker Innsbruck	FC Wacker Innsbruck (2002)	2002

=== Belgium ===
Original club	1st Phoenix club	Year established
K. Stade Leuven	Oud-Heverlee Leuven	1972
KFC Herentals	VC Herentals	2000
K. Lyra	K. Lyra-Lierse Berlaar	2002
K.S.K. Beveren	K.S.K. Beveren	2010
Beerschot AC	K Beerschot VA	2013
R.E. Mouscron	Royal Excel Mouscron	2010
K.R.C. Harelbeke	K.R.C. Harelbeke	2016
R.W.D. Molenbeek	R.W.D. Molenbeek	2015
R.A.E.C. Mons	R.A.E.C. Mons	2015
Lierse S.K.	Lierse S.K.	2018
K.V. Oostende	K.V. Diksmuide-Oostende	2022

=== Brazil ===
Original club	1st Phoenix club	Year established	2nd Phoenix club	Year established
AA Cabofriense^{a}	AD Cabofriense	1997		
Colorado and Pinheiros	Paraná Clube	1989		
Grêmio Novorizontino (1973)	Grêmio Novorizontino (2010)	2010		
Icasa E.C.	A.D.R.C. Icasa	2002		
EC Lemense	CA Lemense	2005	Lemense FC^{d}	2022
Linhares EC	Linhares FC	2001		
Operário Várzea-Grandense^{b}	EC Operário	1996	Operário Ltda.	2003
Taguatinga EC (1964)^{c}	Taguatinga EC (2018)	2018		
AD Vitória	AAD Vitória das Tabocas	2008		

- ^{a} AA Cabofriense was refounded as AD Cabofriense in 1997 by the same directors with the aim of separating football from the social club activities.
- ^{b} Due to financial problems, Operário Várzea-Grandense (also known as CEOV) withdrew from professional football in 1996. As it is one of the clubs with the most fans in the state, EC Operário was created with the same colors (red and green) as the traditional CEOV. Despite being state champion twice (1997 and 2002), the club did not receive the expected support and closed its activities in 2002. Another club with a similar name was created (Operário Futebol Ltda.), this time with red and black colors in honor of CR Flamengo, and has won the 2006 tournament. Operário Ltda. currently competes in the second division and the original CEOV returned to professional football in 2013.
- ^{c} The original Taguatinga EC and CA Taguatinga (former CA Bandeirante) merged in 2018.
- ^{d} Former SC Atibaia.

=== Bulgaria ===
Original club	1st Phoenix club	Year established	2nd Phoenix club	Year established
PFC Beroe Stara Zagora	Olimpic-Beroe	1999	PFC Beroe Stara Zagora AD	2008
F.C. Etar	FC Etar 1924 Veliko Tarnovo	2003	OFC Etar Veliko Tarnovo	2013
FC Chernomorets Burgas	PSFC Chernomorets Burgas	2005	FC Chernomorets 1919 Burgas	2015

=== Canada ===
Original club	Year established	Phoenix Club	Year established	2nd Phoenix Club	Year established
Supra de Montréal (1988-1992)	1988	FC Supra du Québec	2026		
Hamilton Steelers (1958–1967)	1958	Hamilton Steelers (1981–1992)	1981		
Montreal Impact (1992–2011)	1992	CF Montréal (Note: Known as the Montreal Impact from their founding through the 2020 season.)	2010		
North York Rockets	1987	Toronto Rockets	1993		
Ottawa Fury (2005–2013)	2005	Ottawa Fury FC	2014		
Toronto Blizzard (1971–1984) (Note: Known as the Toronto Metros from their founding through the 1974 season, and as the Toronto Metros-Croatia from 1975 to 1978.)	1971	Toronto Blizzard (1986–1993)	1986		
Vancouver Whitecaps (1974–84)	1974	Vancouver Whitecaps (1986–2010) (Note: Known as the Vancouver 86ers from their founding through the 2000 season.)	1986	Vancouver Whitecaps FC	2009

=== China ===
Original club	Phoenix club	Year established
Wuhan Optics Valley F.C.	Wuhan Yangtze River F.C.	2009
Hebei Zhuoao F.C.	Shijiazhuang Gongfu F.C.	2020
Hebei F.C.	Langfang Glory City F.C.	2022
Shaanxi Chang'an Athletic F.C.	Shaanxi Union F.C.	2023
Heilongjiang Ice City F.C.	Heilongjiang Ice City F.C. (2025)	2025

=== Czech Republic ===
Original club	Phoenix club	Year established
DFC Prag	DFC Prag	2016
Dukla Prague	FK Dukla Prague	2001

=== Costa Rica ===
Original club	Phoenix club	Year established
Asociación Deportiva Limonense	Limón F.C.	2009
A.D. Generaleña^{a}	AS Puma Generaleña	2010

^{a} A.D. Generaleña merged with A.D. Pérez Zeledón to become Municipal Pérez Zeledón, de facto only continuing the Pérez Zeledón heritage.

=== Croatia ===
Original club	Phoenix club	Year established	2nd Phoenix club	Year established
HŠK Građanski Zagreb	GNK Dinamo Zagreb	1945		
US Fiumana^{a}	HNK Rijeka	1946		
NK Varaždin (1931–2015)^{b}	NK Varteks	2011	NK Varaždin (2012)	2012
NK Orijent (1919-2014)	HNK Orijent 1919	2015		
NK Zadar	HNK Zadar	2020		
NK Inter Zaprešić	NK Inker Zaprešić	2022		
HNK Šibenik	GNK Šibenik	2026		

^{a} The city of Rijeka was part of the Kingdom of Italy and it was known as Fiume.

^{b} The finances of the original NK Varaždin (called NK Varteks from 1958 to 2010) stumbled repeatedly for five years. When this led to their suspension in 2011, an unassociated NK Varteks was created. When they were suspended again in 2012, a new unassociated Varaždin emerged. The original club, including its records and history, folded in 2015.

=== England / Wales ===
Original club	Phoenix club	Year established
Willand Wanderers F.C.	Willand Rovers F.C.	1946
Accrington Stanley F.C. (1891)	Accrington Stanley F.C.	1968
Gateshead A.F.C.	Gateshead F.C.	1977
Newport County	Newport County A.F.C.	1989
Aldershot F.C.	Aldershot Town F.C.	1992
Wimbledon F.C.^{a}	AFC Wimbledon	2002
Telford United F.C.	AFC Telford United	2004
Emley	Emley A.F.C.	2005
Hornchurch F.C.	A.F.C. Hornchurch	2005
Scarborough F.C.	Scarborough Athletic F.C.	2007
Farnborough Town F.C.	Farnborough F.C.	2007
Halifax Town A.F.C.	FC Halifax Town	2008
Fisher Athletic F.C.	Fisher F.C.	2009
Chester City F.C.	Chester F.C.	2010
Ilkeston Town	Ilkeston F.C.	2010
Merthyr Tydfil F.C.	Merthyr Town F.C.	2010
King's Lynn F.C.	King's Lynn Town F.C.	2010
Rushden & Diamonds F.C.	AFC Rushden & Diamonds	2011
Windsor & Eton F.C.	Windsor F.C.	2011
Croydon Athletic F.C.	AFC Croydon Athletic	2012
Llanelli A.F.C.	Llanelli Town A.F.C.	2013
Hereford United F.C.	Hereford F.C.	2015
Salisbury City F.C.	Salisbury F.C.	2015
Ilkeston F.C.	Ilkeston Town F.C.	2017
North Ferriby United A.F.C.	North Ferriby F.C.	2019
Bury F.C.	Bury A.F.C.^{b}	2021
Rhyl F.C.	C.P.D. Y Rhyl 1879	2020
Macclesfield Town F.C.	Macclesfield F.C.	2020
Whyteleafe F.C.	AFC Whyteleafe	2021
Farsley Celtic F.C.	FC Farsley	2025
Widnes FC	Widnes Town F.C.	2026

^{a} Wimbledon F.C. relocated to Milton Keynes in 2004 and was renamed Milton Keynes Dons F.C., two years after the Football Association's binding decision to permit the move, and two years after the founding of AFC Wimbledon; see Relocation of Wimbledon F.C. to Milton Keynes.

^{b} In February 2022, Bury fans' group Est.1885 acquired the trading name, history and memorabilia of Bury F.C.. In May 2023, the Bury Football Club Supporters' Society (who owned Gigg Lane and the "Bury FC" trading name) and the Shakers Community Society (who owned phoenix club Bury AFC) merged. Bury AFC adopted the Bury FC playing name and returned to Gigg Lane, following FA approval in June 2023. The two team's histories were combined — retroactively counting Bury AFC's seasons as seasons for Bury FC.

=== Finland ===
Original club	Phoenix club	Year established
Tampere United	TamU-K	2009

=== France ===
Original club	Phoenix club	Year established
FC Nancy	AS Nancy Lorraine	1967
Gap FC	Gap Foot 05	2012
Toulouse FC	Toulouse FC	1970
FC Sète	SC Sètois	2023

=== Germany ===
Original club	1st Phoenix club	Year established	2nd Phoenix club	Year established
SC Tasmania 1900 Berlin	SV Tasmania Berlin	1973		
BSG Chemie Leipzig (1950)	FC Sachsen Leipzig	1990	BSG Chemie Leipzig (1997)	1997
SpVgg Blau-Weiß 1890 Berlin	SV Blau Weiss Berlin	1992		
1. FC Lokomotive Leipzig (1966)	1. FC Lokomotive Leipzig (2003)	2003		
SG Dynamo Schwerin	SG Dynamo Schwerin	2003		
1. FC Kattowitz	1. FC Katowice	2007		
DVV Coburg	FC Coburg	2011		
FC Sachsen Leipzig	SG Sachsen Leipzig	2011	LVF Sachsen Leipzig	2014
Kultur Sport Verein Hessen Kassel	FC Hessen Kassel	1993	KSV Hessen Kassel	1998

=== Greece ===
Original club	Operating period	Source	1st Phoenix club	Operating period	Source	2nd Phoenix club	Operating period	Source	3rd Phoenix club	Operating period	Source
G.S. Iraklis Thessalonikis	1908–2012		A.E.P. Iraklis 1908	2012–2019		A.S. Iraklis 2015	2019–2020		P.O.T. Iraklis	2021–present	

=== India ===
Original club	Phoenix club	Year established
Salgaocar FC	Clube de Salgaocar	2024
Mohun Bagan	Mohun Bagan Super Giants	2020

=== Indonesia ===
Original club	Phoenix club	Year established
Persijatim East Jakarta	Jakarta Timur	2005
Persegi Gianyar	PS Gianyar	2011
Perseba Super Bangkalan	Perseba Bangkalan	2012
Persisam Putra Samarinda	Borneo Samarinda	2014
Persekaba Badung	Persekaba Bali	2017
Persebo Bondowoso	Persebo Muda	2017
Persikad Depok	Persikad 1999	2018
Persires Rengat	Persires Indragiri Hulu	2019
PS Bangka	PS Bangka (2019)	2021
Persikubar West Kutai	Persikubar Putra	2021
Persisam Putra Samarinda	Persisam United	2021
Persika Karawang	Persika 1951	2022
Persipasi Bekasi	Persipasi Kota Bekasi	2022
Persebo Bondowoso	Persebo 1964	2023
Perseta Tulungagung	Perseta 1970	2023
Persiku Kutai	Persikukar Kutai Kartanegara	2023
Persikutim East Kutai	Persikutim United	2025
Persiwa Wamena	Wamena United	2025
Perseru Serui	PS Yapen	2026

=== Italy ===
In the early 21st century, numerous Italian clubs endured very severe economic problems, including some famous and historically successful teams. Some, most notably Fiorentina, Napoli, Parma and Torino were each declared formally bankrupt and thus had to reapply to the Italian football authorities to play at a lower level, with new owners and as new corporate entities. However, all are considered to be the same clubs before and after the bankruptcy rather than separate phoenix entities: they obtained the "sports title" to remain in the Italy football pyramid using clauses in the Article 52 of N.O.I.F.

=== Japan ===
Original club	Phoenix club	Year established
Yokohama Flügels	Yokohama FC	1998

=== Korea ===
Original club	1st Phoenix club	Year established	2nd Phoenix club	Year established	3rd Phoenix club	Year established
Police FC	Ansan Police FC	2014	Asan Mugunghwa FC	2017	Chungnam Asan FC	2020

=== Latvia ===
Original club	Phoenix club	Year established
FK Liepājas Metalurgs	FK Liepāja	2014
FK Ventspils	JFK Ventspils	2021

=== Lithuania ===
Original club	Phoenix club	Year established
FK Žalgiris	VMFD Žalgiris^{a}	2009
FBK Kaunas	F.B.K. Kaunas	2012
lt:FK Atmosfera (1973)	FK Atmosfera (2012)	2012
FK Vėtra	FK Vėtra Rūdiškės	2014
FK Dainava Alytus	DFK Dainava	2016
FK Minija Kretinga	FK Minija (2017)	2017
FK Ekranas^{b}		2020

^{a}Following a court settlement in 2014, club acquired rights to the history, titles, name and other assets of the original club.
^{b}In 2020, FK Aukštaitija acquired the name and history of the club disestablished in 2015 from the bankruptcy administrator. The local authorities confirmed the continuity of the club that June.

=== The Netherlands ===
Original club	Phoenix club	Year established
RBC Roosendaal	RBC	2011

=== North Macedonia ===
Original club	Phoenix club	Year established
FK Sloga Jugomagnat	FK Shkupi	2012
FK Bashkimi (1947–2008)	FK Bashkimi (2011)	2011
FK Pobeda	FK Pobeda (2010)	2010

=== Northern Ireland ===
Original club	Phoenix club	Year established
Ballymena F.C.	Ballymena United F.C.	1934
Newry City F.C.	Newry City AFC	2013
Belfast Celtic F.C.	Belfast Celtic F.C. (1978)	1978 (Named Belfast Celtic, 2019)

=== Peru ===
Original club	1st Phoenix club	Year established	2nd Phoenix club	Year established	3rd Phoenix club	Year established
Juan Aurich (1922–1992)	Aurich–Cañaña	1993	Juan Aurich (1996–2004)	1996	Juan Aurich (2005)	2005

=== Poland ===
Original club	Phoenix club	Year established
1. FC Kattowitz	1. FC Katowice	2007
Amica Wronki	Błękitni Wronki	2007
Pogoń Lwów	Pogoń Lwów	2009
Dyskobolia Grodzisk Wielkopolski	Nasza Dyskobolia Grodzisk Wielkopolski	2017
Ogniwo Sopot	PDP Ogniwo Sopot	2018
MKP Kotwica Kołobrzeg	MKS Kotwica Kołobrzeg	2025

=== Portugal ===
Original club	1st Phoenix club	Year established	2nd Phoenix club	Year established
Associação Naval 1º de Maio	Associação Naval 1893	2017		
Clube Desportivo das Aves	Clube Desportivo das Aves 1930	2020		
Clube de Futebol Estrela da Amadora	C.D. Estrela	2011	Club Football Estrela da Amadora	2020
Clube de Futebol União	União da Bola F.C.	2022		
Futebol Clube de Felgueiras	Futebol Clube de Felgueiras 1932	2006		
Futebol Clube da Maia	F.C. Maia Lidador	2009		
Futebol Clube do Marco	A.D. Marco 09	2009		
Boavista Futebol Clube	Panteras Negras F.C.	2025		
Sport Comércio e Salgueiros	S.C. Salgueiros 08 / S.C. Salgueiros	2008		
Sporting Clube Olhanense	Sporting Clube Olhanense 1912	2017		

=== Republic of Ireland ===
Original club	1st Phoenix club	Year established	2nd Phoenix club	Year established
Cork	Cork United	1940	Cork Athletic	1948

=== Romania ===
Original club	Phoenix Club	Year established
FC Steaua București	CSA Steaua București	
CS Universitatea Craiova	FC U Craiova 1948	
FC Politehnica Iași (1945)	FC Politehnica Iași (2010)	2010
FC Politehnica Timișoara	ACS Poli Timișoara	2012
FC Argeș Pitești	F.C. Argeș 1953	2013
CS Gaz Metan Mediaș	ACS Mediaș	2022

=== Russia ===
Original club	Phoenix club	Year established
FC Spartak Ryazan	FC Ryazan	1995
Uralan Elista	FC Elista	2005
FC Kuban Krasnodar	FC Kuban Krasnodar	2018
Alania Vladikavkaz	FC Alania Vladikavkaz (2019)	2019

=== Scotland ===
Original club	Phoenix club	Year established
Clydebank^{b}	Clydebank F.C.	2003
Gretna F.C.	Gretna F.C. 2008	2008

^{b} Airdrieonians F.C. (1878) were liquidated in 2002 but their owners bought Clydebank and rebranded it as Airdrie United (now known as Airdrieonians F.C. (2002)); therefore that club is not a phoenix as it took the place of an existing entity. However the current incarnation of Clydebank is a phoenix, as it was founded by supporters to replace the entity which had moved to Airdrie and had to restart at the bottom of the (Junior) league pyramid.

During the liquidation of The Rangers Football Club plc in 2012, a new company, set up for the purpose, bought the assets of the business and secured the transfer of its SFA membership, which allowed Rangers F.C. to continue playing, albeit having to start again in the lowest national division of the Scottish football league system.

=== Serbia ===
Original club	Phoenix club	Year established
FK Hajduk Kula	OFK Hajduk	2013
FK Mladost Apatin	OFK Mladost APA	2011
FK Radnički Bajmok	FK Radnički 1905	2013
FK Sloga Petrovac na Mlavi	FK Sloga 33	2016
FK Vrbas	OFK Vrbas	2007
FK Dinamo Vranje	FK SU Dinamo Jug	2022

=== Slovakia ===
Original club	Phoenix club	Year established
FC VSS Košice	FC Košice	2018

=== Slovenia ===
Original club	1st Phoenix club	Year established	2nd Phoenix club	Year established
I. SSK Maribor	NK Branik Maribor	1949		
NK Izola	MNK Izola	1996		
NK Ljubljana	FC Ljubljana	2005		
NK Mura	ND Mura 05	2005	NŠ Mura	2012
NK Olimpija Ljubljana (defunct)	NK Olimpija Ljubljana (2005)	2005		
NK Primorje	DNŠ Ajdovščina	2011		
NK Nafta Lendava	NK Nafta 1903	2012		

=== Spain ===
Original club	1st Phoenix club	Year established	2nd Phoenix club	Year established	3rd Phoenix club	Year established
Real Vigo Sporting	RC Celta de Vigo	1923				
Levante FC	Levante UD	1939				
Cartagena CF	Cartagena FC	1940	FC Cartagena	1995		
CD Málaga	Málaga CF	1948				
UD Orensana	CD Ourense	1952	UD Ourense	2014		
RCD Córdoba	Córdoba CF	1954				
SD Ceuta	AD Ceuta FC	1956				
UD Melilla	Melilla CF	1956	UD Melilla	1976		
UD Huesca	SD Huesca	1960				
CD Villarrobledo	CP Villarrobledo	1971				
Getafe Deportivo	Getafe CF	1983				
AD Almería	CP Almería	1983				
Burgos CF	Real Burgos CF	1983	Burgos CF	1994		
SD Gimnástica Arandina	Arandina CF	1987				
Linares CF	CD Linares	1990	Linares Deportivo	2009		
AP Almansa	UD Almansa	1992				
CD Villanovense	CF Villanovense	1992				
CD Antequerano	Antequera CF	1992				
CD Fuengirola	UD Fuengirola	1992	UD Fuengirola Los Boliches	2001		
CF Lorca Deportiva	Lorca CF	1994	Lorca Deportiva CF	2002	CF Lorca Deportiva	2012
Orihuela Deportiva CF	Orihuela CF	1995				
CD Estepona	Unión Estepona CF	1995	CD Estepona FS	2014		
SD Ibiza	UD Ibiza-Eivissa	1995	UD Ibiza	2015		
Sestao SC	Sestao River Club	1996				
CA Marbella	Marbella FC	1997				
CD Manchego	Manchego CF	2000	CD Manchego Ciudad Real	2009		
CP Mérida	Mérida UD	2000	Mérida AD	2013		
SD Compostela	SD Compostela	2004				
Yeclano CF	Yeclano Deportivo	2004				
CD Corralejo	CD Corralejo	2005				
CF Ciudad de Murcia	CAP Ciudad de Murcia	2010 (Note: From 2007 to 2010 the team was relocated to Granada.)				
CF Extremadura	Extremadura UD	2007	CD Extremadura	2022		
Mengíbar CF	CD Atlético Mengíbar	2008				
Torredonjimeno CF	UD Ciudad de Torredonjimeno	2009				
Huercalense CF	Huércal-Overa CF	2009				
CD Logroñés	SD Logroñés	2009				
CD Logroñés	UD Logroñés	2009				
CD Molinense	CF Molina	2009	Unión Molinense CF	2018		
CD San Fernando	San Fernando CD	2009	CD San Fernando 1940	2025		
Águilas CF	Águilas FC	2010				
Daimiel CF	Daimiel Racing Club	2010				
UE Lleida	Lleida Esportiu	2011				
Talavera CF	CF Talavera de la Reina	2011				
CD La Unión	CF La Unión	2011	La Unión CF	2012		
Jumilla CF	FC Jumilla	2011	Jumilla ACF	2020		
CD Badajoz	CD Badajoz 1905	2012				
Polideportivo Ejido	CP El Ejido 1969	2012				
Motril CF	CF Motril	2012				
CD San Martín	EI San Martín	2012				
UD Salamanca	Unionistas de Salamanca CF	2013				
UD Salamanca	Salamanca CF UDS	2013				
CF Palencia	Palencia CF	2013				
Alicante CF	CFI Alicante	2014				
CD Puertollano	Calvo Sotelo Puertollano CF	2015				
Caravaca CF	UD Caravaca	2015				
Hellín Deportivo	Hellín CF	2016				
Huracán Valencia CF	CF Huracán Moncada	2016				
CD Baza	CD Ciudad de Baza CP 2017	2017				
Ontinyent CF	Ontinyent 1931 CF	2019				
CD Díter Zafra	CD Zafra	2021				
Dos Hermanas CF	Dos Hermanas CF 1971	2021				
CF Reus Deportiu	Reus FC Reddis	2022				

=== Turkey ===
Most phoenix clubs in Turkey are clubs that were originally founded independently under a different name and only repurposed as a replacement of the better known original club following its dissolution.

Original club	Phoenix club		Year established	Current name adopted
Original club	Founded as	Current name	Year established	Current name adopted
Akçaabat Sebatspor	Sebat Gençlikspor		2018	
Bucaspor	İzmir İl Özel İdarespor	Bucaspor 1928	2011	2021
Çorumspor	Çorum Belediyespor	Çorum F.K.	1997	2019
Diyarbakırspor	Tarım Doğanspor	Diyarbekirspor	1977	2015
Erzincanspor	Refahiyespor	24 Erzincanspor	1984	2015
Erzurumspor	Erzurum Büyükşehir Belediyespor	Erzurumspor F.K.	2005	2022
Gaziantepspor	Sankospor	Gaziantep F.K.	1988	2019
İskenderunspor	Erzinspor	İskenderunspor (1978)	1978	2009
Kardemir Karabükspor	Adatepe Dökecekspor	Karabük İdman Yurdu	2015	2023
Kastamonuspor	Tosya Belediyespor	Kastamonuspor 1966	1942	2014
Malatyaspor	Malatya Belediyespor	Yeni Malatyaspor	1986	2010
Manisaspor	Manisa Belediyespor	Manisa F.K.	1994	2019
Mersin İdman Yurdu	İçelspor	Yeni Mersin İdmanyurdu	1964	2022
Orduspor	Ordu İl Özel İdarespor	52 Orduspor	1973	2019
Orduspor	Ordu Soyaspor	Orduspor 1967	1966	2020
Vanspor	Belediye Vanspor	Vanspor F.K.	1982	2019
Yozgatspor	Şefaatli Belediyespor	Yozgatspor 1959 F.K.	1984	2015
Zonguldakspor	Demir Madencilik Dilaverspor	Zonguldak Kömürspor	1986	2011

=== Ukraine ===
Original club	1st Phoenix club	Year established	2nd Phoenix club	Year established	3rd Phoenix club	Year established	4th Phoenix club	Year established
Kolhospnyk Cherkasy	Dnipro Cherkasy	1975	FC Cherkasy	2003	FC Dnipro Cherkasy	2018	–	–
Torpedo Lutsk	Torpedo Lutsk	1977	–	–	–	–	–	–
Desna Chernihiv	Desna Chernihiv	1977	–	–	–	–	–	–
Kolos Poltava	Vorskla Poltava	1984	–	–	–	–	–	–
Dnipro Kremenchuk	Kremin Kremenchuk	1988	MFC Kremin Kremenchuk	2003	–	–	–	–
Karpaty Lviv	FC Karpaty Lviv	1989	FC Karpaty Lviv	2020 (debated)	–	–	–	–
USC Skala Stryi	FC Skala Stryi	1992	FC Hazovyk-Skala Stryi	2001	FC Skala Stryi	2011	FC Skala 1911 Stryi	2022
Polihraftekhnika Oleksandriya	PFC Oleksandriya	2004	FC Oleksandriya	2014	–	–	–	–
Lokomotyv Vinnytsia	PFC Nyva Vinnytsia	2006	FC Nyva Vinnytsia	2016	–	–	–	–
Chervona Zirka Zinovyevsk	FC Zirka Kropyvnytskyi	2007	–	–	–	–	–	–
Pogoń Lwów	Pogoń Lwów (2009)	2009	–	–	–	–	–	–
Khodak Cherkasy	FC Slavutych Cherkasy	2010	FC Cherkashchyna	2018	–	–	–	–
Arsenal Kyiv	FC Arsenal Kyiv	2001	FC Arsenal-Kyiv Kyiv	2014	–	–	–	–
Kolhospnyk Rivne	NK Veres Rivne	2015	–	–	–	–	–	–
FC Lviv	FC Lviv	2016	–	–	–	–	–	–
Tavriya Simferopol	SC Tavriya Simferopol	2016	–	–	–	–	–	–
Avanhard Zhytomyr	FC Polissya Zhytomyr	2016	–	–	–	–	–	–
KhPZ Kharkiv	FC Metalist Kharkiv	2020	–	–	–	–	–	–
Kryvyi Rih	FC Kryvbas Kryvyi Rih	2020	–	–	–	–	–	–
Naftovyk Okhtyrka	FC Naftovyk Okhtyrka	2020	–	–	–	–	–	–
USC Dovbush Chernivtsi	USC Dovbush Chernivtsi	2020	–	–	–	–	–	–

- Notes:
  - Due to World War I and World War II, technically all of the clubs that competed before those wars were recreated from scratch in order to continue yet for many clubs of the Soviet part of Ukraine immediate their revival upon hostilities conditionally is considered as continuation of business. Due to recent renewed hostilities by the Russian Federation, many clubs were forced to suspend their business operations indefinitely.
  - While perceived as phoenix club of FC Dnipro, officially SC Dnipro-1 is considered to be a totally new club according to the FIFA rulings as the club did not clear its debts and refused to acknowledge them.
  - Polish club of Pogon Lwow was reestablished in Ukraine by local Polish diaspora based on Pogon Lwow of the interbellum Poland. The club competes at regional level.
  - Technically split between Metal Kharkiv and Metalist 1925 Kharkiv, in 2020 the Ukrainian Association of Football officially acknowledge heritage of the original club after Metal Kharkiv.

=== United States ===
Original club	1st Phoenix club	Year established	2nd Phoenix club	Year established	3rd Phoenix club	Year established
Portland Timbers (1975–1982)	Portland Timbers (1985–1990)	1985	Portland Timbers (2001–2010)	2001	Portland Timbers	2009
New York Giants	New York Giants	1923	New York Giants	1927		
New York Hakoah	New York Hakoah	1956	New York Hakoah	2009		
Fort Lauderdale Strikers (1977–83)	Fort Lauderdale Strikers (1988–94)	1988	Fort Lauderdale Strikers (2006–2016)	2006		
San Jose Earthquakes (1974–88)	San Jose Clash/Earthquakes	1994	San Jose Earthquakes	2008		
Seattle Sounders (1974–83)	Seattle Sounders (1994–2008)	1994	Seattle Sounders FC	2007		
New York Cosmos (1970–85)	New York Cosmos (2013–2020)	2010	New York Cosmos	2025		
Tampa Bay Rowdies (1975–93)	Tampa Bay Rowdies	2010				
Tulsa Roughnecks (1978-1984)	Tulsa Roughnecks FC (2015-2019)	2013				
Houston Dynamos (1984–1991)	Houston Dynamo	2005				
Austin Aztex FC	Austin Aztex	2011				
Philadelphia Fury (1978–1980)	Philadelphia Fury (2011–2019)	2011				
Los Angeles Wolves	L.A. Wolves FC	2014				
FC Tulsa (NPSL)	FC Tulsa	2020				
Bethlehem Steel F.C. (1907–30)	Bethlehem Steel FC	2015				
Rochester Lancers (1967–1980)	Rochester Lancers (2015)	2015				
Philadelphia Atoms	Philadelphia Atoms SC	2017				

== Baseball ==
=== United States ===
Original club	1st Phoenix club	Year established	2nd Phoenix club	Year established	3rd Phoenix club	Year established	4th Phoenix club	Year established
Baltimore Orioles (1882–1899)	Baltimore Orioles (1901-1902)	1901	Baltimore Orioles (1903–1914, 1916–1953)	1903	Baltimore Orioles (Note: Ironically, the fourth iteration of the Orioles are a two-time Phoenix club, having previously served as the third iteration of the Milwaukee Brewers.)	1954	—N/a	
Buffalo Bisons (1879–1885)	Buffalo Bisons (1886–1970)	1886	Buffalo Bisons	1979	—N/a			
Indianapolis Clowns	Indianapolis Clowns (BBCL)	2026	—N/a					
Los Angeles Angels (PCL)	Los Angeles Angels	1961	—N/a					
Miami Marlins (IL)	Miami Marlins (1962–70, 1982–88)	1962	Florida/Miami Marlins	1993	—N/a			
Milwaukee Brewers (1884–1885)	Milwaukee Brewers (1886–92)	1886	Milwaukee Brewers (1894-1901)	1894	Milwaukee Brewers (1902–52)	1902	Milwaukee Brewers	1970
New York Metropolitans	New York Mets	1961	—N/a					
San Diego Padres (1936-68)	San Diego Padres	1969	—N/a					
Washington Senators (1891–99)	Washington Senators/Nationals (1901–60)	1901	Washington Senators (1961–71)	1961	Washington Nationals	2005	—N/a	

== Basketball ==
=== Belarus ===
Original club	Phoenix club	Year established
RTI Minsk	BC Minsk	2006

=== Bosnia and Herzegovina ===
Original club	Phoenix club	Year established
SKK Borac Banja Luka	OKK Borac Banja Luka	2011
Sloboda Tuzla	OKK Sloboda Tuzla	2011

=== Croatia ===
Original club	Phoenix club	Year established
Cedevita Zagreb	Cedevita Junior	
Kvarner	Kvarner 2010	2010
Šibenka	GKK Šibenka	
Zagreb	KK Zagreb	

=== Czechia ===
Original club	Phoenix club	Year established
BK Prostejov	BK Olomoucko	2017

=== Estonia ===
Original club	Phoenix club	Year established
KK Kalev	BC Kalev	2005

=== Finland ===
Original club	Phoenix club	Year established
Namika Lahti	Lahti Basketball	2015

=== France ===
Original club	Phoenix club	Year established
Paris Basket Racing	Metropolitans 92	2007

=== Germany ===
Original club	Phoenix club	Year established
SG Braunschweig	Basketball Löwen Braunschweig	2000
DJK Würzburg	Würzburg Baskets	

=== Greece ===
Original club	Operating period	Source	1st Phoenix club	Operating period	Source
G.S. Iraklis Thessalonikis	1921–2022		G.S. Iraklis Agias	2022–present	

=== Italy ===
Original club	Phoenix club	Year established
Felice Scandone	Avellino Basket	2021
Pallalcesto Amatori Udine	APU Udine	2011
Benetton Treviso	Universo Treviso	2012
S.S. Basket Napoli	Napoli Basket	2016
Auxilium Pallacanestro Torino	Basket Torino	2019
Viola Reggio Calabria	Viola Supporters Trust	2019
Virtus Roma	Virtus GVM Roma 1960	2021

=== Netherlands ===
Original club	Phoenix club	Year established
BV Den Helder	Den Helder Suns	2016

North Macedonia

Original club	Phoenix club	Year established
KK Kumanovo	MKK Kumanovo	

=== Poland ===
Original club	Phoenix club	Year established
Prokom Trefl Sopot	Trefl Sopot	2009

=== Russia ===
Original club	Phoenix club	Year established
CSK VVS-Samara	Krasnye Krylia	2009
Ural Great Perm	Parma Perm	

=== Serbia ===
Original club	Phoenix club	Year established	2nd Phoenix club	Year established
FMP Železnik	KK FMP	2011		
KK Radnički Kragujevac	KK Radnički Kragujevac	2009	KK SPD Radnički	2015

=== Slovenia ===
Original club	Phoenix club	Year established
KK Olimpija	KK Cedevita Olimpija	2019
KK Koš Koper	KK Koper Primorska	

=== Spain ===
Original club	Phoenix club	Year established
CB Vetusta	Oviedo CB	2004
Cáceres CB	Cáceres Ciudad del Baloncesto	2007
CB Ciudad de Huelva	CD Huelva Baloncesto	2008
CB Guadalajara	CEBA Guadalajara	2011
CE Lleida Bàsquet	Força Lleida CE	2012
Baloncesto León	Fundación Baloncesto León	2012
CB Granada	Fundación CB Granada	2012
Gijón Baloncesto	Gijón Basket	2015
CB Valladolid	Real Valladolid Baloncesto	2015
CB Lucentum Alicante	Fundación Lucentum Baloncesto	2015
Menorca Bàsquet	CB Menorca	2016

=== United Kingdom ===
Original club	Phoenix club	Year established
Thames Valley Tigers	Guildford Heat	2005
Manchester Giants (1975–2001)	Manchester Giants	2011

=== Ukraine ===
Original club	Phoenix club	Year established
BC Kyiv	Kyiv-Basket	

=== United States ===
Original club	Phoenix club	Year established
Portland Fire (2000–2002)	Portland Fire	2024
Houston Comets(1997-2008)	Houston Comets	2027

== Gridiron football ==
=== Canada ===
Original club	Phoenix club	Year established	Second Phoenix Club	Year established
Ottawa Rough Riders	Ottawa Renegades	2002	Ottawa Redblacks	2014
Montreal Alouettes (1946-1981)	Montreal Concordes/Alouettes (1982-1986)	1982	Montreal Alouettes	1996

=== United States ===
Original club	Phoenix club	Year established	Second phoenix club	Year established
Albany Firebirds (1990–2003)	Albany Firebirds (2002–2009)	2002	Albany Firebirds (AF1)	2024
Baltimore Colts (1947–1950)	Baltimore Colts (1953–1983)	1953	Baltimore CFL Colts (1994-1995)	1994
Birmingham Stallions (1980s)	Birmingham Stallions (UFL)	2022	—N/a	
Buffalo Bills (1946–1949)	Buffalo Bills	1960	—N/a	
Cincinnati Bengals (1937–1941)	Cincinnati Bengals	1968	—N/a	
Iowa Barnstormers (AFL)	Iowa Barnstormers (IFL)	2008	—N/a	
Nashville Kats (AFL)	Nashville Kats (AF1)	2024	—N/a	
Quad City Steamwheelers (1999–2009)	Quad City Steamwheelers (2018)	2018	—N/a	

== Ice hockey ==
=== Canada ===
Original club	Phoenix club	Year established
Calgary Wranglers (WHL)	Calgary Wranglers	2022
Hamilton Bulldogs (AHL)	Hamilton Bulldogs	2015
Ottawa Senators (original)	Ottawa Senators	1992
Vancouver Canucks (WHL)	Vancouver Canucks	1970
Winnipeg Jets (1972–96)	Winnipeg Jets	2011

=== England ===
Original club	Phoenix club	Year established
Manchester Storm (1995–2002)	Manchester Phoenix	2003

=== Japan ===
Original club	Phoenix club	Year established
Nippon Paper Cranes	East Hokkaido Cranes	2019

=== Sweden ===
Original club	Phoenix club	Year established
Hammarby Hockey (1921–2008)	Hammarby Hockey	2008

=== United States ===
Original club	Phoenix club	2nd phoenix club	3rd phoenix club	In operation
Bakersfield Condors	Bakersfield Condors	—N/a		1998–2015; 2015–
Baton Rouge Kingfish (ECHL)	Baton Rouge Zydeco	Baton Rouge Kingfish (FPHL)	—N/a	1996–2003; 2023–2026; 2026-
Fresno Falcons (1946–2008)	Fresno Falcons (2026)	—N/a		1946–2008; 2026–
Los Angeles Monarchs	Los Angeles Blades	Los Angeles Kings	—N/a	1944-1950; 1961-1967; 1967-
Manchester Monarchs (AHL)	Manchester Monarchs (ECHL)	—N/a		2001–2015; 2015–2019
Mobile Mysticks (ECHL)	Mobile Mysticks (SPHL)	—N/a		1995–2002; 2027–
Monroe Moccasins (WPHL)	Monroe Moccasins (FPHL)	—N/a		1997–2001; 2024–
Orlando Solar Bears (IHL)	Orlando Solar Bears (ECHL)	—N/a		1995–2001; 2012–
Peoria Rivermen (IHL)	Peoria Rivermen (ECHL)	Peoria Rivermen (AHL)	Peoria Rivermen (SPHL)	1984–1996; 1996–2005; 2005–2013; 2013–
Pittsburgh Hornets	Pittsburgh Hornets	—N/a		1936–1956; 1961–1967

== Volleyball ==
=== Greece ===
Original club	Operating period	Source	1st Phoenix club	Operating period	Source	2nd Phoenix club	Operating period	Source
G.S. Iraklis Thessalonikis	1921–2015		A.S. Iraklis 2015	2015–2021		N.G.S. Iraklis Thessalonikis 1908	2021–present	
