= 2025–26 Liga 4 East Kalimantan =

Liga 4 East Kalimantan
- Season: 2025–26
- Dates: 28 January – 15 February 2026
- Champions: Balikpapan (1st title)
- National phase: Balikpapan

The 2025–26 Liga 4 East Kalimantan will be the second season of Liga 4 East Kalimantan after the change in the structure of Indonesian football competition and serves as a qualifying round for the national phase of the 2025–26 Liga 4.

The competition is organised by the East Kalimantan Provincial PSSI Association.

== Teams ==
=== Participating teams ===
A total of 5 teams are competing in this season.

No	Team	Location	2024–25 season
1	Persikubar Putra	West Kutai Regency	—
2	Kartanegara	Kutai Kartanegara Regency	Champions
3	Bocah Liar	Samarinda	—
4	Balikpapan	Balikpapan City	Runner-up
5	Balikpapan United	Balikpapan City	—

== Standings ==
Pos	Team	Pld	W	D	L	GF	GA	GD	Pts	Qualification
1	Balikpapan (C)	8	8	0	0	39	6	+33	24	Champion and qualified for the National phase
2	Kartanegara	8	5	0	3	17	22	−5	15	
3	Bocah Liar	8	3	1	4	14	13	+1	10	
4	Balikpapan United	8	2	0	6	10	15	−5	6	
5	Persikubar Putra	8	1	1	6	6	30	−24	4	

Source: Liga 4 East Kalimantan
(C) Champions

== See also ==
- 2025–26 Liga 4
- 2025–26 Liga 4 Central Kalimantan
- 2025–26 Liga 4 South Kalimantan
- 2025–26 Liga 4 West Kalimantan
