= 2023–24 Liga 3 East Kalimantan =

Tournament details
- Country: Indonesia
- Venue: 3
- Dates: 20 December 2023 – 17 January 2024
- Teams: 15

Final positions
- Champions: Kartanegara (1st title)
- Runners-up: Sangkulirang
- Third place: Caladium
- Qualified for: 2023–24 Liga 3 National Phase

Tournament statistics
- Matches played: 64
- Goals scored: 304 (4.75 per match)

The 2023–24 Liga 3 East Kalimantam is the sixth season of Liga 3 East Kalimantan organized by Asprov PSSI Kaltim.

Followed by 16 clubs. The winner of this competition will advance to the national round without the regional round Kalimantan representing East Kalimantan for promotion to Liga 2.

== Teams ==
Initially, it was planned that there would be 16 teams participating in this season's competition. But as of 12 December 2023, it was confirmed that Persikukar and PS Mitra Kukar withdrew and were replaced by Persisam United.

No.	Team	Location
1	Balikpapan United	Balikpapan
2	Caladium	Balikpapan
3	Berau	Berau
4	Persikutim	East Kutai
5	Sangkulirang	East Kutai
6	Harbi	Samarinda
7	Persisam United	Samarinda
8	Kartanegara (Mesra)	Kutai Kartanegara
9	ACN Muara Badak	Kutai Kartanegara
10	Gelora Pantai	Kutai Kartanegara
11	MSA	Kutai Kartanegara
12	Perselan	Kutai Kartanegara
13	Persikukar^{WD}	Kutai Kartanegara
14	PS Mitra Kukar^{WD}	Kutai Kartanegara
15	Paser United	Paser
16	PS Penajam Utama	Penajam North Paser
17	Persikubar Putra	West Kutai

== Venues ==
- Rondong Demang Stadium, Kutai Kartanegara Regency
- Sadurengas Stadium, Paser Regency
- Aji Imbut Stadium, Kutai Kartanegara

== First round ==
=== North District ===
All matches were held at Rondong Demang Stadium, Kutai Kartanegara.

Pos	Team	Pld	W	D	L	GF	GA	GD	Pts	Qualification	SFC	KFC	ACN	BFC	PKB	PKT	SAM
1	Sangkulirang	6	5	1	0	23	5	+18	16	Advance to Play-off round	—	2–0		1–1			6–1
2	Kartanegara (Mesra) (H)	6	5	0	1	24	6	+18	15	Advance to Play-off round		—	4–2		1–0		
3	ACN Muara Badak	6	3	1	2	15	11	+4	10	Advance to Play-off round	1–6		—	0–0		2–1	7–0
4	Berau	6	2	3	1	12	12	0	9	Advance to Play-off round		2–6		—	4–3	3–0	2–2
5	Persikubar Putra (Note: Persikubar Putra were deducted three points by the Disciplinary Committee of Asprov PSSI East Kalimantan.)	6	2	0	4	11	14	−3	3 (Note: Head-to-head result: Perikutim 1–2 Persikubar Putra.)		1–3		0–3 (Note: ACN Muara Badak were awarded a 3–0 win over Persikubar Putra.)		—		5–2
6	Persikutim	6	1	0	5	11	14	−3	3		1–5	0–2			1–2	—	
7	Persisam United	6	0	1	5	5	39	−34	1			0–11				0–8	—

Source: Liga 3 East Kalimantan
(H) Hosts

=== South District ===
All matches were held at Sadurengas Stadium, Paser.

Pos	Team	Pld	W	D	L	GF	GA	GD	Pts	Qualification	PSR	CLD	PJM	BPU	HRB	MSA	GPN	PLN
1	Paser United (H)	7	6	1	0	51	4	+47	19	Advance to Play-off round	—	2–1	2–2			12–0		13–0
2	Caladium	7	6	0	1	30	4	+26	18	Advance to Play-off round		—	1–0		4–0	9–0		
3	PS Penajam Utama	7	5	1	1	21	6	+15	16	Advance to Play-off round			—	7–0				2–0
4	Balikpapan United	7	3	1	3	15	18	−3	10	Advance to Play-off round	0–5	1–3		—				6–0
5	Harbi	7	2	1	4	12	16	−4	7		0–5		0–3	1–1	—		1–2	
6	MSA	7	1	1	5	11	38	−27	4				3–6	1–2	0–5	—		
7	Gelora Pantai	7	1	1	5	7	29	−22	4		1–12	1–6	0–1	1–5		2–2	—	
8	Perselan	7	1	0	6	5	37	−32	3			0–6			1–5	2–5	2–0	—

Source: Liga 3 East Kalimantan
(H) Hosts

== Play-off round ==
=== North District ===
Summary

The first legs will be played on 8 January 2024, and the second legs will be played on 10 January 2024.

The winners of the ties advanced to the semifinal.

Team 1	Agg.	Team 2	1st leg	2nd leg
Sangkulirang	6–0	ACN Muara Badak	3–0	3–0
Karatnegara (Mesra)	13–0	Berau	5–0	8–0

Matches

8 January 2024
14.00 WITA

Sangkulirang	3–0 (w.o.)	ACN Muara Badak
	Report

Rondong Demang Stadium, Kutai Kartanegara

Sangkulirang were awarded a 3–0 win over ACN Muara Badak.

10 January 2024
14.00 WITA

ACN Muara Badak	0–3 (w.o.)	Sangkulirang

Rondong Demang Stadium, Kutai Kartanegara

Sangkulirang were awarded a 3–0 win over ACN Muara Badak. Sangkulirang won 6–0 on aggregate.

8 January 2024
16.00 WITA

Kartanegara (Mesra)	5–0	Berau
	Report

Rondong Demang Stadium, Kutai Kartanegara
10 January 2024
16.00 WITA

Berau	0–8	Kartanegara (Mesra)
	Report

Rondong Demang Stadium, Kutai Kartanegara

Kartanegara (Mesra) won 13–0 on aggregate.

=== South District ===
Summary

The first legs will be played on 8 January 2024, and the second legs will be played on 10 January 2024.

The winners of the ties advanced to the semifinal.

Team 1	Agg.	Team 2	1st leg	2nd leg
Paser United	5–1	PS Penajam Utama	3–0	2–1
Caladium	5–1	Balikpapan United	2–1	3–0

Matches

8 January 2024
14.00 WITA

Paser United	3–0	PS Penajam Utama
	Report

Sadurengas Stadium, Paser
10 January 2024
14.00 WITA

PS Penajam Utama	1–2	Paser United
	Report

Sadurengas Stadium, Paser

Paser United won 5–1 on aggregate.

8 January 2024
16.00 WITA

Caladium	2–1	Balikpapan United
	Report

Sadurengas Stadium, Paser
10 January 2024
16.00 WITA

Balikpapan United	0–3	Caladium
	Report

Sadurengas Stadium, Paser

Caladium won 5–1 on aggregate.

== Knockout round ==
=== Bracket ===
Semi-finals
Sangkulirang	3	2	5
Caladium	3	1	4
Paser United	1	3	4
Kartanegara (Mesra)	3	2	5

Final
Sangkulirang	0
Kartanegara (Mesra)	3
Third place play-off
Caladium	2
Paser United	1

=== Semi-finals ===
Summary

The first legs will be played on 13 January 2024, and the second legs will be played on 15 January 2024.

Team 1	Agg.	Team 2	1st leg	2nd leg
Sangkulirang	5–4	Caladium	3–3	2–1
Paser United	4–5	Kartanegara (Mesra)	1–3	3–2

Matches

13 January 2024
14.00 WITA

Sangkulirang	3–3	Caladium
	Report

Aji Imbut Stadium, Kutai Kartanegara
15 January 2024
14.00 WITA

Caladium	1–2	Sangkulirang
	Report

Aji Imbut Stadium, Kutai Kartanegara

Sangkulirang won 5–4 on aggregate.

13 January 2024
16.00 WITA

Paser United	1–3	Kartanegara (Mesra)
	Report

Aji Imbut Stadium, Kutai Kartanegara
15 January 2024
16.00 WITA

Kartanegara (Mesra)	2–3	Paser United
	Report

Aji Imbut Stadium, Kutai Kartanegara

Kartanegara (Mesra) won 5–4 on aggregate.

=== Third place play-off ===
17 January 2024
13.00 WITA

Caladium	2–1	Paser
	Report

Aji Imbut Stadium, Kutai Kartanegara

=== Final ===
17 January 2024
15.30 WITA

Sangkulirang	0–3	Kartanegara
	Report

Aji Imbut Stadium, Kutai Kartanegara

== Qualification to the national phase ==
As of 20 March 2024, Asprov PSSI East Kalimantan confirmed that Sangkulirang withdrew from the national phase due to the club's financial problems. Instead, the remaining slot was given to Caladium as the third place of 2023–24 Liga 3 East Kalimantan.

Team	Method of qualification	Date of qualification	Qualified to
Kartanegara	2023–24 Liga 3 East Kalimantan champions	17 January 2024	2023–24 Liga 3 National Phase
Caladium	2023–24 Liga 3 East Kalimantan runner-up	17 January 2024	2023–24 Liga 3 National Phase

== Top scorers ==
Rank	Player	Team	Goals
1	(Indonesia) Muhammad Yusuf	Caladium	19
2	(Indonesia) Muhammad Raju Andika	Kartanegara (Mesra)	14
3	(Indonesia) Owentianus Nouvic	Paser United	13
4	(Indonesia) Muhammad Ridwan	Paser United	10
5	(Indonesia) Reza Gumelar	Sangkulirang	8

== See also ==
- 2023–24 Liga 3 National phase
- 2023 Liga 3 South Kalimantan
- 2023 Liga 3 North Kalimantan
- 2023 Liga 3 West Kalimantan
- 2023 Liga 3 Central Kalimantan
