= 2018 Liga 3 East Kalimantan =

Liga 3 East Kalimantan
- Season: 2018
- Champions: PS PU Bontang

The 2018 Liga 3 East Kalimantan is the third edition of Liga 3 (formerly known as Liga Nusantara) East Kalimantan as a qualifying round for the national round of 2018 Liga 3. PSAD Mulawarman, winner of the 2017 Liga 3 East Kalimantan are the defending champions. The competition started on 22 April 2018.

== Format ==
In this competition, 19 teams are divided into 3 groups. The two or three best teams are through to knockout stage. The winner will represent East Kalimantan in the national round of 2018 Liga 3.

== Teams ==
There are 19 clubs which will participate in this season.

== Group stage ==
This stage started on 22 April 2018.

=== Group A ===
- All matches held in Segiri Stadium (for opening ceremony and first match only), Palaran Stadium, and Sempaja Stadium, Samarinda

Pos	Team	Pld	W	D	L	GF	GA	GD	Pts	Qualification
1	MSA (A)	6	6	0	0	18	1	+17	18	Advance to next round
2	AC Nilam Hanter (A)	6	4	1	1	22	3	+19	13	Advance to next round
3	Pengairan (A)	6	4	1	1	15	6	+9	13	Advance to next round
4	Harbi Putra (E)	6	2	1	3	12	16	−4	7	
5	GMC Sportivitas (E)	6	2	0	4	6	15	−9	6	
6	Perselan Sanga-Sanga (E)	6	1	1	4	7	21	−14	4	
7	Nostalgia (E)	6	0	0	6	9	27	−18	0	

Updated to match(es) played on 8 May 2018 (complete). Source: MD-1MD-2MD-3MD-4MD-5MD-6MD-7MD-8Klasemen Akhir
(A) Advance to a further round; (E) Eliminated

=== Group B ===
- All matches held in Panglima Sentik Stadium, Penajam

Pos	Team	Pld	W	D	L	GF	GA	GD	Pts	Qualification
1	PS Penajam Utama (A)	3	3	0	0	7	1	+6	9	Advance to next round
2	Mitra Teras (A)	3	2	0	1	5	3	+2	6	Advance to next round
3	Marine (E)	3	1	0	2	4	7	−3	3	
4	Paser Daya Taka (E)	3	0	0	3	0	5	−5	0	

Updated to match(es) played on 30 April 2018 (complete). Source: MD-1MD-2MD-3
(A) Advance to a further round; (E) Eliminated

=== Group C ===
- All matches held in Taman Prestasi Stadium, and Bessai Berinta Lang-lang Stadium, Bontang

Pos	Team	Pld	W	D	L	GF	GA	GD	Pts	Qualification
1	PS PU Bontang (A)	7	5	2	0	13	2	+11	17	Advance to next round
2	Bontang City (A)	7	5	1	1	18	8	+10	16	Advance to next round
3	Berau (A)	7	5	0	2	18	7	+11	15	Advance to next round
4	Bontang (E)	7	4	0	3	13	12	+1	12	
5	Persikutim East Kutai (E)	7	3	2	2	14	10	+4	11	
6	PS Setda Bontang (E)	7	2	1	4	7	14	−7	7	
7	Bontang Mitra United (E)	7	1	0	6	11	23	−12	3	
8	Sangkulirang (E)	7	0	0	7	0	21	−21	0	

Updated to match(es) played on 8 May 2018 (complete). Source: Klasemen Akhir
(A) Advance to a further round; (E) Eliminated
