= Biranna Diop =

Senegalese footballer

Personal information
- Full name: Birahim Diop
- Date of birth: 26 January 1982 (age 44)
- Place of birth: Dakar, Senegal
- Height: 1.93 m (6 ft 4 in)
- Position: Centre-back

Senior career*
Years	Team	Apps	(Gls)
2006–2007	Renacimiento FC		
2007–2011	Peñarroya		
2011	Campillo		
2012–2013	Peñarroya		

International career^{‡}
2006	Equatorial Guinea	2	(0)
- * Club domestic league appearances and goals ‡ National team caps and goals as of 3 September 2006

Birahim "Biranna" Diop (born 26 January 1982) is a former footballer who played as a centre-back. Born in Senegal, he played for the Equatorial Guinea national team.

== Honours ==
=== Club ===
- Renacimiento FC
  - Equatoguinean Premier League: 2006, 2007

=== International ===
- Equatorial Guinea
  - CEMAC Cup: 2006

== National team ==
Diop was playing in a Senegalese club until that he has been sold to an Equatoguinean club (Renacimiento FC). There the coach of the Equatoguinean national team (that in this moment was the Brazilian Antônio Dumas) proposed him to play him with his selection. This way, he has adopted the Equatoguinean nationality, and he already takes 20 matches with the national team. .

Diop played also a friendly match against the Brazilian side Cruzeiro and other against the team of Pará de Minas (Minas Gerais, Brazil) in the Estádio Ovídio de Abreu on 5 December 2005. He was part of the Equatoguinean team in the Mundialito de la Inmigración y la Solidaridad 2009 in Madrid, Spain.
