= Persikutim United =

Indonesian football club

Persikutim Patriot United
- Full name: Persatuan Sepakbola Indonesia Kutai Timur Patriot United Football Club
- Nicknames: Singa Mose (Mad Lion)
- Founded: 1999; 27 years ago as Persikutim East Kutai; 4 June 2025; 16 months ago as Persikutim United
- Ground: Kudungga Stadium; East Kutai, East Kalimantan
- Capacity: 10,000
- Owner: PT. Sport East Kutai
- Chairman: H. Ismunandar
- Manager: Pandi Widiarto
- Coach: Purwanto Suwondo
- League: Liga Nusantara
- 2025–26: Liga Nusantara, 5th (Group C); Relegation play-off winner
Home colours	Away colours	Third colours

Persatuan Sepakbola Indonesia Kutai Timur Patriot United Football Club, commonly known as Persikutim Patriot United, is an Indonesian football club based in Sangatta, East Kutai, East Kalimantan. They currently compete in Liga Nusantara. Founded in 1999, Persikutim play their home match in Kudungga Stadium.

They compete in Liga Nusantara from 2025–26, the third tier of the Indonesian football after they took the slot of NZR Sumbersari.

== History ==
In 2021–22 season, they competed in Liga 3 East Kalimantan zone where they emerged as champions after defeating Persisam United in the final round and automatically advanced to the national phase. In the national phase, the best achievement achieved by Persikutim was the second round by collecting one point from three matches and fourth place in Group Q.

Last season's results saw Persikutim return to compete at the provincial level the following season, but the league that season was halted due to the incident at Kanjuruhan Stadium.

In the 2023–24 season, Persikutim joined the North District where they were ranked sixth with three points from six matches and could not advance to the next round. When Liga 4 was formed in the 2024–25 season, Persikutim could not participate where in that season only two teams participated for the East Kalimantan zone.

However, Persikutim added the word "United" to the official name so that the name changed to Persikutim United and moved up to Liga Nusantara for the 2025–26 season after acquiring NZR Sumbersari's license on 4 June 2025, with the changes ratified at the 2025 PSSI Ordinary Congress in Jakarta.

== Rivalries ==
Persikutim East Kutai main rivals are Persikukar and Persikubar who called Kutai derby.

== Players ==
=== Current squad ===
As of 6 December 2025

Note: Flags indicate national team as defined under FIFA eligibility rules; some limited exceptions apply. Players may hold more than one non-FIFA nationality.

No.	Pos.	Nation	Player
2	MF	IDN	Arif Agung Musthofa
3	DF	IDN	Ergun Firlansyah
4	DF	IDN	Deni Kusnanto
5	DF	IDN	Farhan Sapiulloh
8	MF	IDN	Noval Junior
9	FW	IDN	Yoga Panjaitan
10	DF	IDN	Adrian Sunusi
11	FW	IDN	Dicky Kurniawan
13	DF	IDN	Andika Kurniawan
14	DF	IDN	Sholeh Febrianto
15	FW	IDN	Dylan Bonay
16	DF	IDN	Dion Saputra
17	MF	IDN	Akhmad Riyadi
18	FW	IDN	Ayuep Yulianto
21	DF	IDN	Faaris Silva

No.	Pos.	Nation	Player
22	MF	IDN	Fandi Eko Utomo
24	MF	IDN	Raditya Rahardjo
25	DF	IDN	Ari Wakum
27	GK	IDN	Muhammad Ridho
28	FW	IDN	Raflianoor
33	GK	IDN	Juanda Saputra
34	DF	IDN	Andrew Purnomo
35	DF	IDN	Febri Suryanto
36	MF	IDN	Ilham Fahmi
45	MF	IDN	Daud Kotulus
57	MF	IDN	Albert Theo
73	FW	IDN	Ilham Pratama
88	FW	IDN	Yosua Yoltuwu
90	FW	IDN	Johan Yoga Utama (captain)
95	GK	IDN	Gale Trisna

== Performance by season ==
=== Records ===
Season	League	Tier	Tms	Pos	Piala Indonesia
As Persikutim East Kutai
2009–10	Second Division	4	81	unknown	–
2010–11	Second Division	4	65	Third round	–
2011–12	First Division (LPIS)	3	66	3rd, Group IX	–
2013	First Division	3	77	3rd, Group XVI	–
2014	First Division	3	73	3rd, Group Q	–
2015	Liga Nusantara East Kalimantan	3	season abandoned		–
2016	ISC Liga Nusantara East Kalimantan	3		Champion	–
2016	ISC Liga Nusantara National round	3	32	Round of 16	–
2017	Liga 3 East Kalimantan	3	15	Eliminated	–
2018	Liga 3 East Kalimantan	3	19	5th, Group C	–
2019	Liga 3 East Kalimantan	3	13	Semi-final	–
2020	Liga 3 East Kalimantan	3	season abandoned		–
2021–22	Liga 3 East Kalimantan	3	17	Champion	–
2021–22	Liga 3 National phase	3	64	4th, Group Q	–
2022–23	Liga 3 East Kalimantan	3	season abandoned		–
2023–24	Liga 3 East Kalimantan	3	15	6th, North District	–
2024–25	Liga 4 East Kalimantan	4	did not participate		–
Rebranding to Persikutim United after takeover of NZR Sumbersari
2025–26	Liga Nusantara	3	24	Relegation play-off winner	–
2026–27	Liga Nusantara	3	24	TBD	–

=== Season by season ===
As Persikutim East Kutai

Season	Tier	Division	Place	Piala Indonesia
2009–10	4	SD	unknown	–
2010–11	4	SD	Third round	–
2011–12	3	FD LPIS	3rd, Group IX	–
2013	3	FD	3rd, Group XVI	–
2014	3	FD	3rd, Group Q	–
2015	3	LN	abandoned	–
2016	3	ISC LN	Round of 16	–
2017	3	L3	Eliminated	–
2018	3	L3	5th, Group C	–
2019	3	L3	Semifinal	–
2020	3	L3	abandoned	–
2021–22	3	L3	4th, Group Q	–
2022–23	3	L3	abandoned	–
2023–24	3	L3	6th, North District	–
2024–25	4	L4	did not participate	–

As Persikutim United (after takeover of NZR Sumbersari)

Season	Tier	Division	Place	Piala Indonesia
2025–26	3	LN	Relegation PO winner	–

Current league

- 1 season in Liga Nusantara

Defunct league

- 1 season in ISC Liga Nusantara
- 8 seasons in Liga 3 (as amateur league}
- 3 seasons in Second Division (as third-tier)
- 2 seasons in Second Division (as fourth-tier)

== Honours ==
- Liga Indonesia Second Division East Kalimantan
  - Champion (1): 2004
- Liga 3 East Kalimantan
  - Champion (1): 2021
