= Clube Atlético Lemense =

Lemense
- Full name: Clube Atlético Lemense
- Nickname(s): Azulão Querido; Onça Azul
- Founded: 4 October 2005; 19 years ago
- Ground: Brunão, Leme, São Paulo state, Brazil
- Capacity: 7,659
Home colours	Away colours

Clube Atlético Lemense, commonly known as Lemense, is a currently inactive Brazilian football club based in Leme, São Paulo.

== History ==
The club was founded on 4 October 2005, after Esporte Clube Lemense closed its football department in 2004. Clube Atlético Lemense was founded to fill the spot left by the other club.

== Stadium ==
Lemense play their home games at Estádio Municipal Bruno Lazzarini, nicknamed Brunão. The stadium has a maximum capacity of 7,659 people.
