= Luciano Mutasi =

Cameroonian footballer

Lucien Moutassie
Personal information
- Full name: Lucien Moutassie
- Date of birth: 3 May 1988 (age 38)
- Place of birth: Sanaga-Maritime, Cameroon
- Position: Defensive midfielder

Senior career*
Years	Team	Apps	(Gls)
	Avenir de Douala	–	(–)
	Cintra de Yaoundé	–	(–)
–2006	Deportivo Mongomo	–	(–)
2006–2007	Mengíbar	1	(1)
2007–2008	Peñarroya-Pueblonuevo	–	(–)
2008–2009	(Equatoguinean club)	–	(–)
2009	Lucena (trial)	–	(–)
2009–2010	Montilla	4	(0)
2011	Ejea	3	(0)
2011–2012	Tijarafe	13	(0)

International career^{‡}
- Equatorial Guinea U19
2006–2007	Equatorial Guinea	5	(0)
- * Club domestic league appearances and goals ‡ National team caps and goals as of 9 March 2007

Lucien Moutassie (born 3 May 1988) is a footballer who plays as a defensive midfielder.

Born in Cameroon, he was a member, as a naturalized citizen, of the Equatorial Guinea national team.

== National team ==
Like many foreign players who have played or are currently playing in the league of Equatorial Guinea, Moutassie was naturalized in that country (where he was renamed Luciano Mutasi Mba) and called for the Equatoguinean squad in the 2006 CEMAC Cup, the Africa Cup of Nations 2008 Qualifying and in friendly matches.

== Honours ==
=== International ===
- Equatorial Guinea
  - CEMAC Cup
    - Winner (1): 2006
