= Lawrence Doe =

Footballer

Personal information
- Date of birth: 3 September 1986 (age 40)
- Place of birth: Monrovia, Liberia
- Height: 1.86 m (6 ft 1 in)

Team information
- Current team: CD Monte Sión

Youth career
- 2002: Stade Malien
- 2004: Sigui

Senior career*
Years	Team	Apps	(Gls)
2003	Djoliba		
2005–2007	Renacimiento	48	(?)
2007–2008	Mengíbar	9	(1)
2008	Renacimiento	?	(?)
2008–2009	Pulpileño	?	(?)
2009–2010	Águilas	9	(1)
2010	Bahla	?	(?)
2010–2011	Pulpileño	3	(0)
2011–2012	Al-Shabab	?	(?)
2012–2013	Platanias	7	(2)
2013	Apollon Smyrnis	2	(0)
2013	Al-Raed	1	(1)
2013–2014	Al-Shabab	25	(1)
2014	ENPPI	3	(0)
2015	Deportivo Mongomo	16	(1)
2015–2016	Episkopi	?	(?)
2016–2017	Quintanar del Rey	4	(1)
2017–2018	Shillong Lajong	14	(1)
2019–	CD Monte Sión	11	(1)

International career
2006–	Equatorial Guinea	21	(2)
- * Club domestic league appearances and goals as of 3 April 2019

Lawrence Doe (born 3 September 1986) is a professional footballer who plays for Spanish club CD Monte Sión. Born in Liberia, he represented Equatorial Guinea internationally.

== Club career ==
Before becoming a professional player, Lawrence played for various clubs in Mali at the junior levels like Stade Malien, Djoliba Athletic Club and AS Sigui where he won the Malien League in 2002 with Stade Malien and Malien Cup with Djoliba Athletic Club in 2003.

Lawrence began his professional career with Renacimiento FC in 2005. He played in forty-eight league matches for the Equatoguinean club. He won the Equatoguinean League with the club in 2005, 2006 and 2007.

In 2007, he moved to Spain, where he played for several clubs in the lower leagues, the highest ranked being Águilas CF in the Segunda División B.

After spending a long three-seasons spell in Spain, he moved to Oman where he signed a contract with first-division club Bahla Club.

In the same season, he came back to Spain and signed a contract with CA Pulpileño.

In 2011, he came back to Oman and signed a contract with Oman Elite League club Al-Shabab Club and helped the club to win the 2011–12 Oman Elite League.

He also spent a brief spell in Greece with Platanias scoring two goals in seven league matches and Apollon Smyrnis, where he played for the club in two matches. In the same season, he moved to Saudi Arabia where he signed a contract with Al Raed of the Saudi Professional League for whom he scored one goal in one match.

Just after one game for Al-Raed, on 30 July 2013 he came back to Oman and signed a contract with one of his former clubs, Al-Shabab Club. He scored one league goal in twenty five league matches for the Oman Professional League club in the 2013–14 Oman Professional League.

In August 2017, Doe signed with Indian I-League club Shillong Lajong. He also appeared in 2018 Indian Super Cup, in which their campaign was ended in quarter-finals.

== International career ==
When Doe played in Mali for Stade Malien, he met with Izetta Sombo Wesley, president of the Liberia Football Association who was in Bamako with the national team in the 2002 Africa Cup of Nations. They exchanged telephone numbers, but finally Doe was never called by Liberia. In 2005, he transferred to Renacimiento and accepted to play for the Equatorial Guinea, then coached by Brazilian Antônio Dumas. With his adopted nation, Doe appeared in the 2006 CEMAC Cup, the 2008 Africa Cup of Nations qualification and the 2010 FIFA World Cup qualification (except against South Africa in Malabo). Also, he appeared in B matches against Brazilian side Cruzeiro Esporte Clube and the regional team of Pará de Minas in 2005, the Region of Murcia and Extremadura in 2007, and at the Mundialito de la Inmigración y la Solidaridad in 2009.

In 2011, Doe scored against French club RSC Montreuil, Brittany, France U-20, OGC Nice and the National Union of Professional Footballers.

== Honours ==
=== Club ===
- With Stade Malien

- Malien League (1): 2002

- With Djoliba

- Malien Cup (1): 2003

- With Renacimiento

- Equatoguinean League (3): 2005, 2006, 2007

- With Al-Shabab

- Omani League (0): 2011–12

=== Country ===
- CEMAC Cup: 2006
