= Balbino =

Balbino may refer to:

- Balbino (footballer, born 1896)
- Balbino Medellin, French singer (fr)
- Balbino (footballer, born 1997)
