= Kadrie Oening Stadium =

Football stadium in Samarinda, Indonesia

- Sempaja Stadium
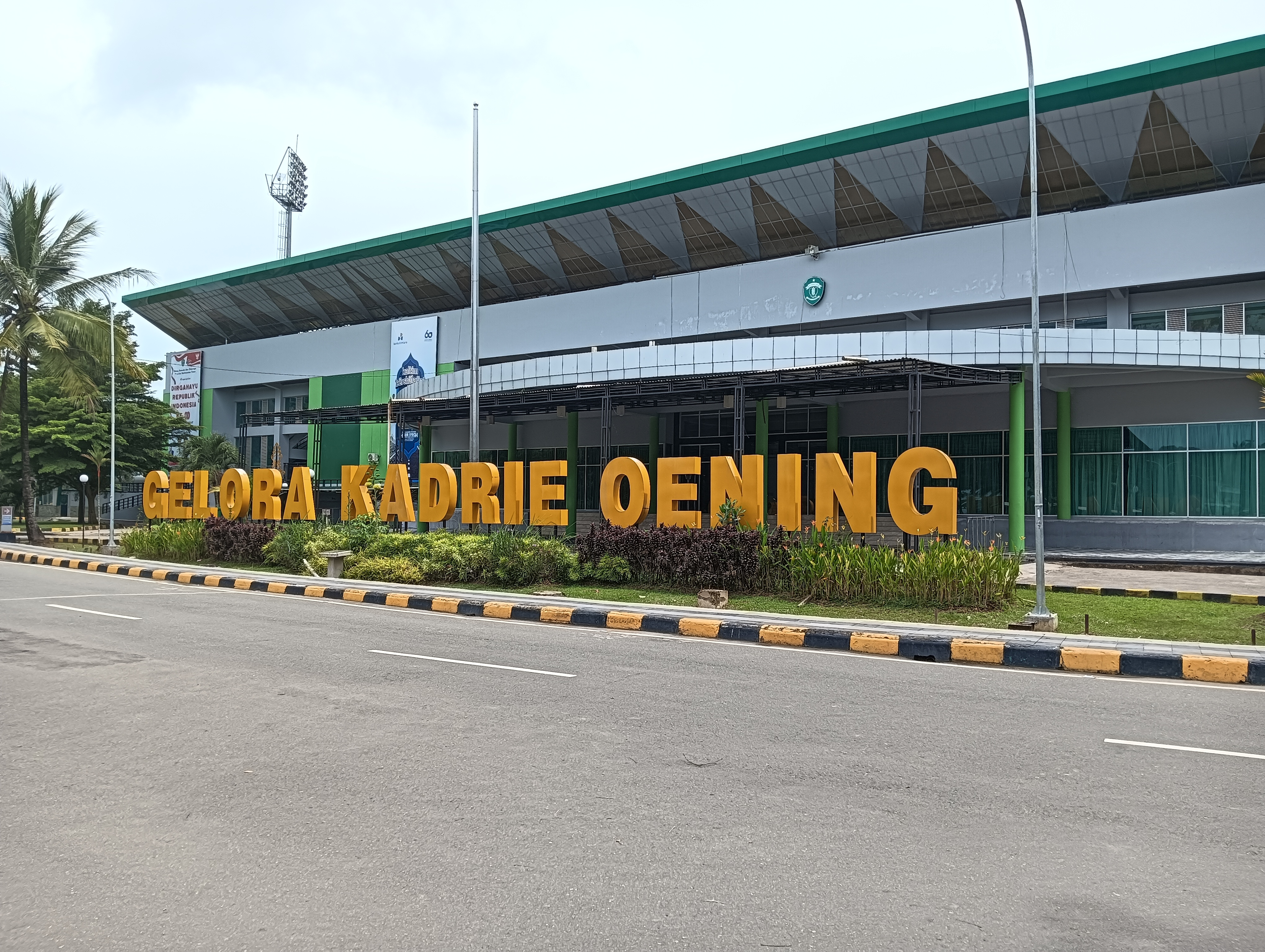

- Location in Samarinda, Kalimantan and Indonesia Kadrie Oening Stadium (Kalimantan) Kadrie Oening Stadium (Indonesia)
- Former names: Madya Sempaja Stadium
- Address: K.H. Wahid Hasyim Road, South Sempaja, North Samarinda, Samarinda, East Kalimantan 75243; Indonesia
- Location: South Sempaja, North Samarinda, Samarinda, East Kalimantan, Indonesia
- Coordinates: 0.453234°S 117.156131°E
- Owner: Government of Samarinda City
- Operator: Government of Samarinda City
- Capacity: 15,000

Tenant
- Persisam United

Kadrie Oening Stadium, formerly known as Madya Sempaja Stadium or Sempaja Stadium, is a football stadium in Samarinda, Indonesia. It is located in K.H. Wahid Hasyim Road.

== History ==
In 2007, the stadium was chosen as the best stadium in the Liga Indonesia First Division. It was used by Persisam Putra Samarinda before they moved to Segiri Stadium.

The stadium's name change was officially announced by the Governor of East Kalimantan, Isran Noor, on 30 May 2022, through the signing of an inscription attended by regional officials and the family of the late Kadrie Oening. The name of the Madya Sempaja Stadium was officially changed to Kadrie Oening Stadium.

== Facilities ==
There is a hotel to accommodate athletes competing in the stadium.
