= Esporte Clube Lemense =

Lemense
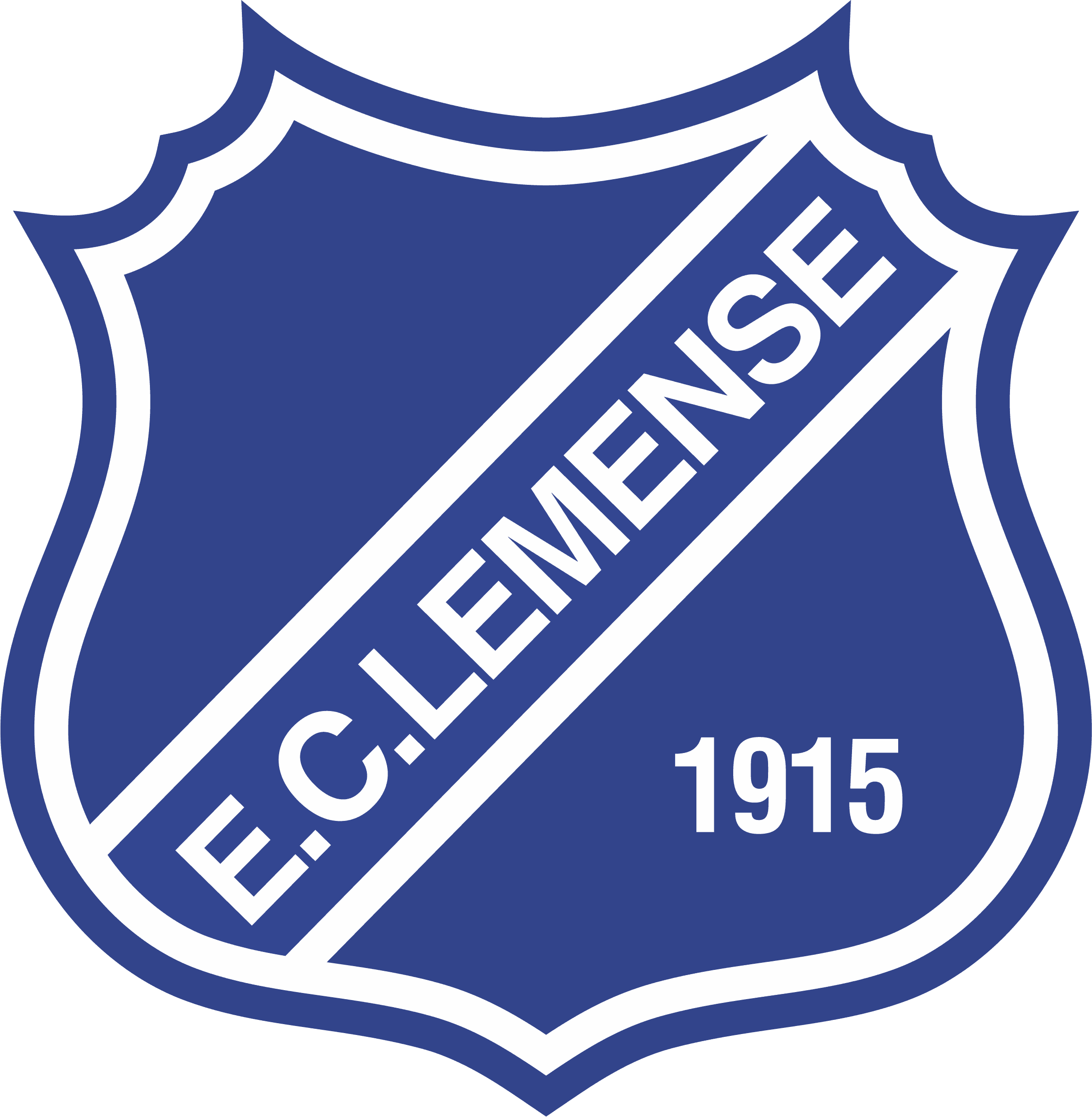
- Full name: Esporte Clube Lemense
- Nickname(s): Azulão Querido; Onça Azul
- Founded: 16 June 1915; 109 years ago
- Dissolved: 2005; 20 years ago
- Ground: Brunão, Leme, São Paulo state, Brazil
- Capacity: 7,659
Home colours	Away colours

Esporte Clube Lemense, commonly known as Lemense, was a Brazilian football club based in Leme, São Paulo.

== History ==
Founded on 16 June 1915, Lemense played amateur football before going into inactivity. In 1967, in an attempt to return to an active status, the club took over the colours of Esporte Clube Bancário, the first team of the city to play professional football, and refounded the team on 16 April of that year.

They won the Campeonato Paulista Segunda Divisão in 1978, and the Campeonato Paulista Série A3 in 1980, and remained 13 consecutive seasons in the second division (current Campeonato Paulista Série A2) before a change in the structure by Federação Paulista de Futebol moved the club down to the fourth tier.

Lemense closed their football section in 2004, and saw Clube Atlético Lemense being founded in the following year to take their spot.

== Achievements ==
- Campeonato Paulista Série A3:
  - Winners (1): 1980
- Campeonato Paulista Série A4:
  - Winners (1): 1978

== Stadium ==
Clube Atlético Lemense played their home games at Estádio Municipal Bruno Lazzarini, nicknamed Brunão. The stadium has a maximum capacity of 7,659 people.
