= Andika Kurniawan =

Indonesian footballer

Personal information
- Full name: Muhammad Andika Kurniawan
- Date of birth: 23 April 1995 (age 31)
- Place of birth: Jambi, Indonesia
- Height: 1.75 m (5 ft 9 in)
- Position: Centre-back

Team information
- Current team: Persikutim United
- Number: 13

Youth career
- 2013–2014: PSIM Yogyakarta
- 2015–2016: PS Kota Jambi

Senior career*
| Years | Team | Apps | (Gls) |
| 2017 | Lampung Sakti | 4 | (0) |
| 2017 | Cilegon United | 7 | (1) |
| 2018 | PSPS Riau | 11 | (0) |
| 2018–2019 | Persiraja | 27 | (0) |
| 2020–2022 | Borneo | 1 | (0) |
| 2021–2022 | → Persiraja Banda Aceh (loan) | 12 | (0) |
| 2022–2023 | Semen Padang | 8 | (0) |
| 2023–2024 | PSPS Riau | 8 | (0) |
| 2024–2025 | Bekasi City | 8 | (0) |
| 2025– | Persikutim United | 3 | (0) |
- * Club domestic league appearances and goals as of 7 January 2026

Muhammad Andika Kurniawan (born 23 April 1995) is an Indonesian professional footballer who plays as a centre-back for Liga Nusantara club Persikutim United.

== Club career ==
=== Borneo FC ===
In 2020, Andika Kurniawan signed for Indonesian Liga 1 club Borneo. This season was suspended on 27 March 2020 due to the COVID-19 pandemic. The season was abandoned and was declared void on 20 January 2021.

=== Return to Persiraja ===
He was signed for Persiraja Banda Aceh to play in the Liga 1 in the 2021–22 season. Andhika made his league debut on 7 January 2022 in a match against PSS Sleman at the Ngurah Rai Stadium, Denpasar.

=== Semen Padang ===
Andhika was signed for Semen Padang to play in Liga 2 in the 2022–23 season. He made his league debut on 29 August 2022 in a match against PSPS Riau at the Riau Main Stadium, Riau.

== Honours ==
=== Club ===
Persiraja Banda Aceh

- Liga 2 third place (play-offs): 2019
