= 2017 Liga 3 East Kalimantan =

Liga 3 East Kalimantan
- Season: 2017

The 2017 Liga 3 East Kalimantan season is the second edition of Liga 3 East Kalimantan as a qualifying round for the national round of 2017 Liga 3. Persikutim East Kutai are the defending champions.

The competition scheduled starts in May 2017.

== Teams ==
This season there are 15 teams will participate the league.

Teams
Bontang
Gelora Pantai
Perselan Sanga-Sanga
Harbi Putra
Bontang Mitra United
PS Setda Bontang
PS PU Bontang
Persikutim East Kutai
PS Penajam Utama
PSAD Mulawarman
Persirau Berau
Sendawar
Mitra Teras
Sangkulirang
Nostalgia
