= ACN Muara Badak =

Indonesian football club

- Full name: Associazione Calcio Nilam Muara Badak
- Nicknames: Badak Muara (Rhinoceros Estuarine)
- Short name: ACN
- Founded: 1982; 44 years ago, as AC Nilam Hanter; 28 October 2018; 7 years ago, as ACN Muara Badak
- Ground: Aji Bambang Yusuf Stadium; Kutai Kartanegara, East Kalimantan
- Capacity: 2,000
- CEO: Tomy
- Manager: Febry Setiawan
- Coach: Irwanto
- League: Liga 3
- 2023: play-off Round, (East Kalimantan zone)
Home colours	Away colours

Associazione Calcio Nilam Muara Badak (simply known as ACN Muara Badak) is an Indonesia association football club based in Muara Badak, Kutai Kartanegara, East Kalimantan. This club currently plays in Liga 3 East Kalimantan zone.

== History ==
ACN Muara Badak was established on 1982 by employees of the oil and gas company, PT Pertamina Hulu Sanga Sanga at Nilam Field, which was inspired by the Italian Serie A club, AC Milan.

When it was first founded, the club was named AC Nilam Hanter, then on 28 October 2018, officially became a Liga 3 club affiliated with Association Provincial PSSI of East Kalimantan (Asprov PSSI Kalimantan Timur) and officially rename to ACN Muara Badak.
