= South Derbyshire Football Association =

The South Derbyshire Football Association was the third oldest football association in the world, after the FA and Sheffield FA. In 1871 it consisted of eleven clubs and used the Sheffield Rules.
