= Paser United F.C. =

Indonesian football club

Paser United
- Full name: Paser United Football Club
- Nicknames: Meriam Paser; Laskar Segentar Bumi
- Founded: 2023; 3 years ago
- Ground: Gentung Temiang KM 5 Stadium
- Capacity: 10,000
- Owner: PSSI Paser Regency
- President: Arie Yohanda
- League: Liga 4
- 2023: 4th (East Kalimantan zone)
Home colours	Away colours

Paser United Football Club is an Indonesian football club based in Paser, East Kalimantan. They currently compete in the Liga 4 East Kalimantan zone.
