= Mengíbar CF =

Mengíbar
- Full name: Mengíbar Club de Fútbol
- Founded: 1976
- Dissolved: 2015
- Ground: Ramón Díaz López, Mengíbar, Andalusia, Spain
- Capacity: 2,000
- Chairman: (Spain) Gil Beltran
- Manager: (Spain) Fernando Zambrano
- 2014–15: Segunda Andaluza Jaén, 2nd of 16
Home colours	Away colours

Mengíbar Club de Fútbol was a Spanish football team based in Mengíbar, in Jaén (Spanish province) in the autonomous community of Andalusia. Founded in 1976, it was dissolved in 2015. The stadium was Estadio Ramón Díaz López with capacity of 500 seats.

== History ==
At 2008-09 mid-season, the team was not presented in three matches, and therefore the club was relegated. After a while the club was dissolved due to financial problems, with CD Atlético Mengíbar taking its place as the club in the city.

Mengíbar returned to an active status in 2012, but was dissolved again in 2015.

== Season to season ==
Season	Tier	Division	Place	Copa del Rey
1977–78	7	2ª Reg.	6th	
1978–79	7	2ª Reg.	6th	
1979–80	7	2ª Reg.	7th	
1980–81	6	1ª Reg.	13th	
1981–82	5	Reg. Pref.	11th	
1982–83	6	1ª Reg.	14th	
1983–84	6	1ª Reg.	2nd	
1984–85	6	1ª Reg.	5th	
1985–86	6	1ª Reg.	6th	
1986–87	6	1ª Reg.	9th	
1987–88	6	1ª Reg.	5th	
1988–89	6	1ª Reg.	1st	
1989–90	5	Reg. Pref.	17th	
1990–91	6	1ª Reg.	6th	
1991–92	6	1ª Reg.	1st	
1992–93	5	Reg. Pref.	9th	
1993–94	5	Reg. Pref.	18th	
1994–95	6	1ª Reg.	7th	
1995–96	6	1ª Reg.	1st	

Season	Tier	Division	Place	Copa del Rey
1996–97	5	Reg. Pref.	12th	
1997–98	5	Reg. Pref.	12th	
1998–99	5	Reg. Pref.	12th	
1999–2000	5	Reg. Pref.	14th	
2000–01	5	Reg. Pref.	(R)	
2001–02	DNP			
2002–03	6	1ª Prov.	3rd	
2003–04	5	Reg. Pref.	18th	
2004–05	7	1ª Prov.	1st	
2005–06	6	Reg. Pref.	2nd	
2006–07	5	1ª And.	2nd	
2007–08	4	3ª	13th	
2008–09	4	3ª	(R)	
2009–10	DNP			
2010–11	DNP			
2011–12	DNP			
2012–13	7	1ª Prov.	2nd	
2013–14	6	Reg. Pref.	2nd	
2014–15	6	2ª And.	2nd	

- 2 seasons in Tercera División

== Noted players ==
- (Equatorial Guinea) (Cameroon) Lucien Moutassie (2006–2007)
- (Equatorial Guinea) (Liberia) Lawrence Doe (2007–2008)
