= Balikpapan F.C. =

Indonesian football club

Balikpapan
- Full name: Balikpapan Football Club
- Nicknames: Pasukan Keladi (Caladium Force)
- Short name: BFC
- Founded: 2021; 5 years ago, as IP GP Caladium Football Club; 2023; 3 years ago, as Balikpapan Football Club
- Ground: Sudirman Field
- Owner: PT. CRA
- Manager: Reza Permana
- League: Liga 4
- 2025–26: 1st (East Kalimantan zone); First round, 3rd in Group C (National phase)
| Home colours | Away colours |

Balikpapan Football Club, formerly known as IP GP Caladium Football Club, is an Indonesian football club based in Balikpapan, East Kalimantan. They currently compete in the Liga 4 East Kalimantan zone.

== History ==
The club was founded in 2021 as Caladium FC by PT Caladium Rezeki Abadi (PT CRA). In its early years, the club focused on developing local players from the Balikpapan area to compete in the regional amateur tier.

In late 2023, the management officially rebranded the club as Balikpapan FC to better represent the city's identity and attract a wider local supporter base. Under this new name, they achieved their best performance in the 2023–24 season. The club finished 3rd in the Liga 3 East Kalimantan zone, which allowed them to advance to the National Phase of Liga 3 for the first time in their history.

In the 2023–24 National Phase, Balikpapan FC was placed in Group D. Despite competitive play, they finished 4th in the group and failed to progress to the round of 32. Following the restructuring of the Indonesian football pyramid by PSSI, the club now competes in Liga 4 starting from the 2025–26 season.

== Season-by-season records ==
| Season(s) | League/Division | Tier | Tms. | Pos. | Piala Indonesia | AFC/AFF competition(s) | |
|---|---|---|---|---|---|---|---|
| 2021–22 | Liga 3 | 3 | 64 | eliminated in provincial phase | – | – | – |
| 2022–23 | Liga 3 | 3 | season abandoned | | – | – | – |
| 2023–24 | Liga 3 | 3 | 80 | 4th, first round | – | – | – |
| 2024–25 | | | | | | | |
| 2025–26 | Liga 4 | 4 | 64 | TBD | – | – | – |

== Honours ==
=== Senior competition ===
- Liga 3 East Kalimantan
  - Third-place (1): 2023–24
- Liga 4 East Kalimantan
  - Champions (1): 2025–26

=== Youth competition ===
- U17 Soeratin Cup East Kalimantan
  - Champions (1) 2023–24
