= Anderson Balbino =

Brazilian footballer

Personal information
- Full name: Anderson Balbino Assis
- Date of birth: 19 January 1997 (age 29)
- Place of birth: Porto Alegre, Brazil
- Height: 1.82 m (6 ft 0 in)
- Positions: Defensive midfielder; centre-back

Team information
- Current team: Comercial-SP

Youth career
- 2013–2015: Grêmio

Senior career*
| Years | Team | Apps | (Gls) |
| 2015–2018 | Grêmio | 6 | (0) |
| 2021 | Veranópolis | 1 | (0) |
| 2021 | Garibaldi | 0 | (0) |
| 2022 | Inter-SM | 11 | (2) |
| 2022–2023 | Al-Qasim | | |
| 2023 | Real Noroeste | 19 | (1) |
| 2024 | Cruzeiro-RS | 9 | (0) |
| 2025 | Real Noroeste | 11 | (0) |
| 2026 | Lemense | 14 | (1) |
| 2026– | Comercial-SP | 0 | (0) |
- * Club domestic league appearances and goals as of 7 June 2026

Anderson Balbino Assis (born 19 January 1997), commonly known as Anderson Balbino, is a Brazilian footballer who plays for Comercial-SP.

== Career ==
Anderson Balbino was born in Porto Alegre, and progressed through the academy of Grêmio, joining in 2013 before making his professional debut in the 2015 season. Having left the club at the conclusion of the 2018 season, and after trialling with Vietnamese side Thanh Hóa in December 2019, Balbino would return to Brazil to join Veranópolis in July 2021. A spell with Garibaldi followed, before he joined Internacional of Santa Maria, Rio Grande do Sul in 2022. After a season in Iraq with Al-Qasim, he joined Real Noroeste in January 2023. He joined Comercial for the second half of the 2026 season.

== Style of play ==
Predominantly a defensive midfielder, Balbino was utilised as a centre-back while at Real Noroeste.

== Career statistics ==
=== Club ===
As of 7 June 2026.

Appearances and goals by club, season and competition
| Club | Season | League | | | State League | | Cup (Note: Includes Copa do Brasil) | | Other | | Total | |
| Club | Season | Division | Apps | Goals | Apps | Goals | Apps | Goals | Apps | Goals | Apps | Goals |
|---|---|---|---|---|---|---|---|---|---|---|---|---|
| Grêmio | 2015 | Série A | 0 | 0 | 1 (Note: Appearances in the Campeonato Gaúcho) | 0 | 0 | 0 | 0 | 0 | 1 | 0 |
| Grêmio | 2016 | Série A | 0 | 0 | 0 | 0 | 0 | 0 | 0 | 0 | 0 | 0 |
| Grêmio | 2017 | Série A | 1 | 0 | 0 | 0 | 0 | 0 | 1 (Note: Appearances in the Primeira Liga) | 0 | 2 | 0 |
| Grêmio | 2018 | Série A | 0 | 0 | 4 | 0 | 0 | 0 | 0 | 0 | 4 | 0 |
| Grêmio | Total | | 1 | 0 | 5 | 0 | 0 | 0 | 1 | 0 | 7 | 0 |
| Veranópolis | 2021 | – | | | 1 (Note: Appearances in the Gaúcho Acesso) | 0 | 0 | 0 | 0 | 0 | 1 | 0 |
| Garibaldi | 2021 | – | | | 0 | 0 | 0 | 0 | 9 (Note: Appearances in the Copa FGF) | 0 | 9 | 0 |
| Inter-SM | 2022 | – | | | 11 | 2 | 0 | 0 | 0 | 0 | 11 | 2 |
| Real Noroeste | 2023 | Série D | 7 | 0 | 12 (Note: Appearances in the Campeonato Capixaba) | 1 | 1 | 0 | 3 (Note: One appearance in the Copa Verde, two appearances in the Copa ES) | 0 | 23 | 1 |
| Cruzeiro-RS | 2024 | – | | | 9 | 0 | 0 | 0 | 0 | 0 | 9 | 0 |
| Real Noroeste | 2025 | – | | | 11 | 0 | 0 | 0 | 14 (Note: Appearances in the Copa ES) | 0 | 25 | 0 |
| Lemense | 2026 | – | | | 14 (Note: Appearances in the Campeonato Paulista Série A4) | 1 | 0 | 0 | 0 | 0 | 14 | 1 |
| Comercial-SP | 2026 | – | | | 0 | 0 | 0 | 0 | 0 | 0 | 0 | 0 |
| Career total | | | 8 | 0 | 63 | 4 | 1 | 0 | 27 | 0 | 99 | 4 |
