= Peñarroya-Pueblonuevo CF =

Peñarroya-Pueblonuevo
- Full name: Peñarroya-Pueblonuevo Club de Fútbol
- Founded: 1947
- Ground: Casas Blancas, Peñarroya, Andalusia, Spain
- Capacity: 2,500
- Chairman: (Spain) Manuel Fernández
- Manager: (Spain) Agustín Navas Chaveli-Daza
- League: Primera Andaluza Córdoba
- 2024–25: Primera Andaluza Córdoba, 3rd of 16
Home colours

Peñarroya-Pueblonuevo Club de Fútbol is a Spanish football team based in Peñarroya-Pueblonuevo, Córdoba, in the autonomous community of Andalusia. Founded in 1947, it plays in Primera Andaluza Córdoba, holding home matches at Estadio Municipal de Casas Blancas, with a 2,500-seat capacity.

== Season to season ==
Season	Tier	Division	Place	Copa del Rey
1947–48	5	2ª Reg.		
1948–49	4	1ª Reg.	10th	
1949–50	4	1ª Reg.	13th	
1950–51	4	1ª Reg.		
1951–52	4	1ª Reg.	6th	
1952–53	4	1ª Reg.	10th	
1953–54	4	1ª Reg.	3rd	
1954–55	3	3ª	3rd	
1955–56	3	3ª	3rd	
1956–57	3	3ª	5th	
1957–58	3	3ª	20th	
1958–59	4	1ª Reg.	10th	
1959–60	3	3ª	12th	
1960–61	3	3ª	6th	
1961–62	3	3ª	12th	
1962–63	3	3ª	W	
1963–75	DNP			
1975–76	6	2ª Reg.	8th	
1976–77	5	1ª Reg.	9th	
1977–78	6	1ª Reg.	16th	

Season	Tier	Division	Place	Copa del Rey
1978–79	7	2ª Reg.	5th	
1979–80	7	2ª Reg.	10th	
1980–81	6	1ª Reg.	1st	
1981–82	5	Reg. Pref.	8th	
1982–83	5	Reg. Pref.	16th	
1983–84	5	Reg. Pref.	20th	
1984–85	6	1ª Reg.	16th	
1985–86	6	1ª Reg.	16th	
1986–87	6	1ª Reg.	8th	
1987–88	6	1ª Reg.	6th	
1988–89	5	Reg. Pref.	8th	
1989–90	5	Reg. Pref.	2nd	
1990–91	5	Reg. Pref.	2nd	
1991–92	5	Reg. Pref.	15th	
1992–93	5	Reg. Pref.	10th	
1993–94	5	Reg. Pref.	9th	
1994–95	5	Reg. Pref.	6th	
1995–96	5	Reg. Pref.	13th	
1996–97	5	Reg. Pref.	11th	
1997–98	5	Reg. Pref.	4th	

Season	Tier	Division	Place	Copa del Rey
1998–99	5	Reg. Pref.	7th	
1999–2000	5	Reg. Pref.	4th	
2001–02	5	Reg. Pref.	13th	
2002–03	5	Reg. Pref.	5th	
2003–04	5	Reg. Pref.	9th	
2004–05	5	1ª And.	15th	
2005–06	6	Reg. Pref.	2nd	
2006–07	5	1ª And.	14th	
2007–08	5	1ª And.	11th	
2008–09	5	1ª And.	6th	
2009–10	5	1ª And.	1st	
2010–11	4	3ª	19th	
2011–12	5	1ª And.	15th	
2012–13	6	Reg. Pref.	10th	
2013–14	6	Reg. Pref.	2nd	
2014–15	5	1ª And.	13th	
2015–16	5	1ª And.	18th	
2016–17	6	1ª And.	3rd	
2017–18	6	1ª And.	1st	

Season	Tier	Division	Place	Copa del Rey
2018–19	5	Div. Hon.	15th	
2019–20	6	1ª And.	15th	
2020–21	6	1ª And.	7th	
2021–22	7	1ª And.	12th	
2022–23	7	1ª And.	3rd	
2023–24	7	1ª And.	2nd	
2024–25	7	1ª And.	3rd	
2025–26	7	1ª And.		

- 9 seasons in Tercera División

== Notable former players ==
- (Equatorial Guinea) (Cameroon) Lucien Moutassie
- (Equatorial Guinea) (Senegal) Biranna Diop
- José Manuel Hernández Avalo, Piochi
