= Rondong Demang Stadium =

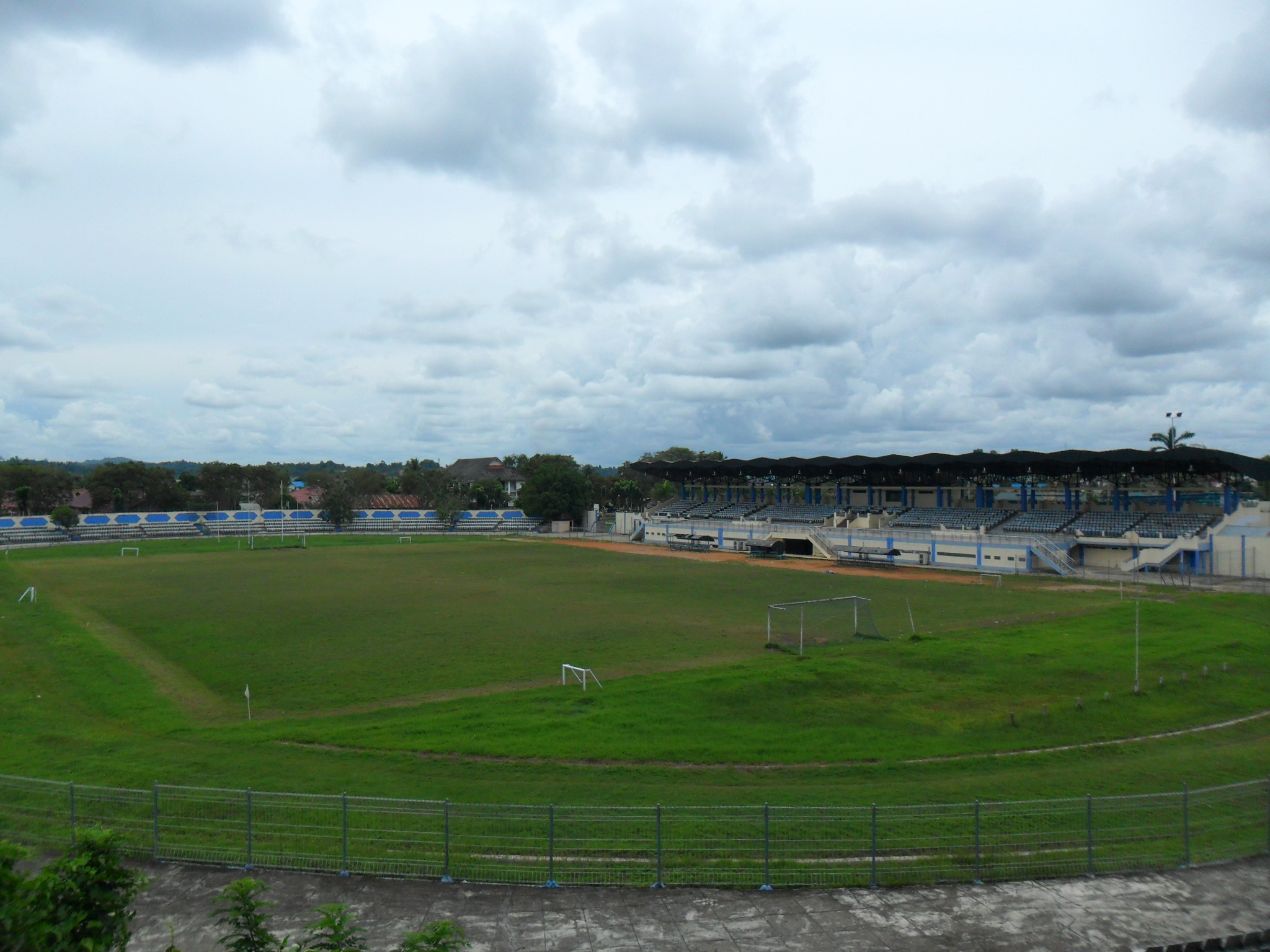
- Interactive map of Rondong Demang Stadium
- Location: Tenggarong, Kutai Kartanegara Regency, East Kalimantan, Indonesia
- Coordinates: 0°24′42.6″S 116°59′01.0″E
- Owner: Government of Kutai Kartanegara Regency
- Operator: Government of Kutai Kartanegara Regency
- Capacity: 10,000 (Football)
- Surface: Grass

Tenants
- Mitra Kukar; Persikukar Kutai Kartanegara; Kartanegara

Rondong Demang Stadium is a multi-use stadium in Tenggarong, Indonesia. It is currently used mostly for football matches and is used as the home venue for Mitra Kukar of the Liga Indonesia. The stadium has a capacity of 10,000 spectators.
