= Persisam United =

Indonesian football club

- Full name: Persatuan Sepakbola Indonesia Samarinda United
- Nickname: Pesut Mahakam (Mahakam Porpoise)
- Short name: Persisam
- Founded: 2021; 5 years ago
- Ground: Kadrie Oening Stadium
- Capacity: 15,000
- Owner: PSSI Samarinda City
- Coach: Rahmat Hidayat
- League: Liga 4
- 2023: 7th, North District (East Kalimantan zone)
Home colours	Away colours

Persatuan Sepakbola Indonesia Samarinda United (simply known as Persisam United) is an Indonesian football club based in Samarinda, East Kalimantan. They competed in Liga 4 in the 2023 season.

== History ==
Founded in 2021, Persisam United made its debut in Indonesian football by joining the third-tier league Indonesia Liga 3 in 2021. Persisam United is a phoenix club of Persisam Putra Samarinda after the original club was moved from their homebase and changed the name to Bali United in 2015.

Persisam United qualified for the national round of Liga 3 after being runner-up in the 2021 Liga 3 East Kalimantan zone. They lost 2-1 to Persikutim East Kutai in the final match. Qualifying in the preliminary round in Liga 3 East Kalimantan zone. Persisam United met clubs from other provinces, playing in Group F in Ciamis Regency on 6 February 2022, In Group F, Persisam United will face Mataram Utama, PS Sandeq, and Citeureup Raya.

== Honours ==
- Liga 3 East Kalimantan
  - Runner-up (1): 2021
