= Leme, São Paulo =

Leme
- Municipality
- Flag Coat of arms

- Location in São Paulo state

- Location in Brazil
- Coordinates: 22°11′10″S 47°23′26″W
- Country: Brazil
- Region: Southeast
- State: São Paulo
- Mesoregion: Piracicaba
- Microregion: Limeira

Government
  - Mayor: Wagner Ricardo Antunes Filho (PSD)

Area
  - Total: 403,077 km^{2} (155,629 sq mi)
- Elevation: 619 m (2,031 ft)

Population (2022 Census)
  - Total: 98,161
  - Estimate (2025): 101,537
  - Density: 0.24353/km^{2} (0.63074/sq mi)
- Time zone: UTC−3 (BRT)
- Website: http://leme.sp.gov.br

Leme is a municipality in the state of São Paulo in Brazil. The population is 104,346 (2020 est.) in an area of 403 km^{2} (156 sq mi). At the 2000 census, it had 80,757 residents, 40,830 of whom are men and 39,927 women. 65,885 residents are 10 years old or older, and of these, 59,991, or 91.1%, are literate. Leme officially became a town on August 29, 1895 (and it celebrates its anniversary on August 29). The municipality is formed by the main district and also includes the rural neighborhoods Taquari, Taquari Ponte and Caju. The population, according to the 2022 IBGE Census was 98,161 and in 2025 the estimate was 101,537.

== Geography ==
Leme has an area of about 403.1 square kilometers, located in the mid-east of São Paulo state, at about 190 kilometers (118 miles) of São Paulo. Placed in the Moji-Guaçu River's drainage basin, Leme has an annual average of about 22 °C (71.6 °F), a dry weather during winter and rainy during summer.

Its average altitude is 619 meters above sea level (2030.8 ft). The relief is lightly wavy in the urban area and in most of rural area, which makes the urban expansion and the agricultural cultivation easier, as well as the transport by bicycle (cheap and non-polluting). This kind of transport is very common in Leme.

=== Hydrography ===
Main streams of Leme:

- Moji-Guaçu River
- Capetinga River
- do Roque Creek
- do Meio Creek
- Constantino Creek
- Batinga Creek
- Serelepe Creek

== Economy ==
The agriculture in Leme has as major crops: sugar cane, maize, soybean, oranges and sorghum. In addition there are big granaries and storehouse for grains and coffee, and a sugarcane mill that produces sugar, ethanol fuel and bioenergy in the municipality. The animal husbandry activities are more focused on swine and cattle breeding, including the presence of some meat packing companies.

The industrial sector is characterized by being very varied, with manufacturers at food, beverages, machines, ethanol fuel, agricultural inputs, chemical products, furnitures, precast barbecues, building and electrical materials areas, and others. Leme has industrial districts very close to Anhanguera Highway (SP-330), where most of the industries are located.

The commerce and services sector at Leme is increasing. Units of many national and some international chain stores are present in the municipality.

== Education ==
Leme has a primary and secondary education system composed by public and private institutions, including a state technical school called ETEC "Salim Sedeh", providing technical courses of management, pharmacy, multimedia, systems development and others. Higher education institutes are also present in Leme. The city has a unit of Universidade Anhanguera and the Universidade Virtual do Estado de São Paulo.

== Transportation ==
- Public urban transportation composed by bus lines connecting downtown to urban and rural neighborhoods
- Bus station "José Antunes Filho" (in Portuguese: Rodoviária de Leme), connecting Leme to other cities of the State of São Paulo and other Brazilian states.
- Aerodrome "Yolanda Penteado"

=== Highways ===
- Rodovia Anhangüera (SP-330): a highway that connects the city of São Paulo to many other cities of the State of São Paulo, going through Leme.

== Media ==
In telecommunications, the city was served by Companhia Telefônica Brasileira until 1973, when it began to be served by Telecomunicações de São Paulo. In July 1998, this company was acquired by Telefónica, which adopted the Vivo brand in 2012.

The company is currently an operator of cell phones, fixed lines, internet (fiber optics/4G) and television (satellite and cable).

== Main attractions and events ==
- 12 Chapels Cycling Circuit (in Portuguese: Circuito das 12 Capelas)
- Path of Faith (in Portuguese: Caminho da Fé)
- City Park "Dr. Enni Jorge Draib" (City Lake)
- Ecological Park "Mourão"
- Water Memorial "Prefeito Ricardo Landgraf"
- Manoel Leme Square (in Portuguese: Praça Manoel Leme) and the old Train Station of Leme
- Historical Museum of Leme
- São Manoel Sanctuary Diocese (in Portuguese: Santuário Diocesano de São Manoel)
- Rui Barbosa Square (in Portuguese: Praça Rui Barbosa)
- Bruno Lazzarini Stadium

Every year Leme hosts the "Festa do Peão de Leme", a large festival with Sertanejo music.

== Sports ==
The Bruno Lazzarini Stadium is a football stadium that hosts the games of Lemense FC. Moreover, Leme has some others football pitches, courts, gymnasiums and recreational spaces used by the population.

== Religion ==
Christianity is present in the city as follows:

=== Catholic Church ===
The Catholic church in the municipality is part of the Roman Catholic Diocese of Limeira.

=== Protestant Church ===
The most diverse evangelical beliefs are present in the city, mainly Pentecostal, including the Assemblies of God in Brazil (the largest evangelical church in the country), Christian Congregation in Brazil, among others. These denominations are growing more and more throughout Brazil.

== See also ==
- List of municipalities in São Paulo
