= Caminho da Fé =

O Caminho da Fé, or The Path of Faith, is a 497 kilometer pilgrimage trail to the Basilica of the National Shrine of Our Lady of Aparecida, in São Paulo, Brazil.

The "Caminho da Fé" was inspired by the Camino de Santiago de Compostela in Spain and was created to organize and provide support for people making the pilgrimage to the National Sanctuary of Aparecida.

Since 2003 the Caminho da Fé has been supported by the Associação dos Amigos do Caminho (Friends of the Caminho Association), based in Águas da Prata, São Paulo.

The path is composed by many branches passing through the states of Minas Gerais and São Paulo along back roads, trails, asphalt, and forest. Approximately 300 kilometers of the 497 kilometer trail is in the Mantiqueira Mountains.
