= List of football associations by date of foundation =

This is a list of national and regional football associations by date of foundation.

== Europe (UEFA) ==
Date	Name	Location	National or Regional	Country
1863	The Football Association	London	National	England
1867	Sheffield Football Association	Sheffield	Regional	England
1871 o.e.	South Derbyshire Football Association	Derbyshire	Regional	England
1873	Scottish Football Association	Glasgow	National	Scotland
1876	Football Association of Wales	Wrexham	National	Wales
1880	Irish Football Association	Belfast	National	Northern Ireland
1882	Essex County Football Association	Essex	Regional	England
1882	London Football Association	London	Regional	England
1883	Glasgow Football Association	Glasgow	Regional	Scotland
1889	Danish Football Association	Brøndby	National	Denmark
1889	Royal Dutch Football Association	Zeist	National	Netherlands
1890^{[n 2]}	Isle of Man Football Association	Douglas	Regional	Isle of Man
1892^{[n 1]}	Leinster Football Association	Dublin	Regional	Ireland
1895	Gibraltar Football Association	Gibraltar	National	Gibraltar
1895	Royal Belgian Football Association	Brussels	National	Belgium
1895	Swiss Football Association	Bern	National	Switzerland
1898	Italian Football Federation	Rome	National	Italy
1900	German Football Association	Frankfurt	National	Germany
1900	Malta Football Association	Ta' Qali	National	Malta
1900	Catalan Football Federation	Barcelona	Regional	Spain
1901	Czech Football Association	Prague	National	Czech Republic
1901	Hungarian Football Federation	Budapest	National	Hungary
1902	Football Association of Norway	Oslo	National	Norway
1904	Austrian Football Association	Vienna	National	Austria
1904	Swedish Football Association	Solna	National	Sweden
1907	Football Association of Finland	Helsinki	National	Finland
1908	Luxembourg Football Federation	Mondercange	National	Luxembourg
1909	Romanian Football Federation	Bucharest	National	Romania
1909	Royal Spanish Football Federation	Madrid	National	Spain
1912	Croatian Football Federation	Zagreb	National	Croatia
1912	Russian Football Union	Moscow	National	Russia
1914	Portuguese Football Federation	Lisbon	National	Portugal
1919	French Football Federation	Paris	National	France
1919^{[n 3]}	Football Association of Serbia	Belgrade	National	Serbia
1919	Polish Football Association	Warsaw	National	Poland
1920	Football Association of Slovenia	Ljubljana	National	Slovenia
1921	Estonian Football Association	Tallinn	National	Estonia
1921	Football Association of Ireland	Dublin	National	Ireland
1921	Latvian Football Federation	Riga	National	Latvia
1922	Lithuanian Football Federation	Vilnius	National	Lithuania
1923	Bulgarian Football Union	Sofia	National	Bulgaria
1923	Turkish Football Federation	Istanbul	National	Turkey
1926	Hellenic Football Federation	Athens	National	Greece
1928	Israel Football Association	Ramat Gan	National	Israel
1930	Albanian Football Association	Tirana	National	Albania
1931	Football Association of Montenegro	Podgorica	National	Montenegro
1931	San Marino Football Federation	Serravalle	National	San Marino
1934	Liechtenstein Football Association	Vaduz	National	Liechtenstein
1934	Cyprus Football Association	Nicosia	National	Cyprus
1936	Georgian Football Federation	Tbilisi	National	Georgia
1938	Slovak Football Association	Bratislava	National	Slovakia
1946	Football Federation of Kosovo	Pristina	National	Kosovo
1947	Football Association of Iceland	Reykjavík	National	Iceland
1949	Football Federation of Macedonia	Skopje	National	North Macedonia
1979	Faroe Islands Football Association	Tórshavn	National	Faroe Islands
1988	Basque Football Federation	Bilbao	Regional	Spain
1989	Football Federation of Belarus	Minsk	National	Belarus
1990	Football Association of Moldova	Chişinău	National	Moldova
1991	Football Federation of Ukraine	Kyiv	National	Ukraine
1992	Football Federation of Armenia	Yerevan	National	Armenia
1992	Association of Football Federations of Azerbaijan	Baku	National	Azerbaijan
1992^{[n 4]}	Football Federation of Bosnia and Herzegovina	Sarajevo	National	Bosnia and Herzegovina
1992	Football Federation of Kazakhstan	Almaty	National	Kazakhstan
1994	Andorran Football Federation	Escaldes-Engordany	National	Andorra

=== Notes ===
- ^1 Originally affiliated to the Belfast based Irish Football Association. In 1921 the LFA became founding members of the Dublin based Football Association of Ireland.
- ^2 Not a UEFA member.
- ^3 Founded as the Football Association of Yugoslavia.
- ^4 Founded as the Sarajevo football subassociation of former Yugoslavia in 1920 but re-founded as the Football Federation of Bosnia and Herzegovina in 1992.

== North America, Central America and the Caribbean (CONCACAF) ==
=== North American Zone (NAFU) ===
Date	Name	Location	National or Regional	Country
1907	Mexican Football Federation	Mexico City	National	Mexico
1912	Canadian Soccer Association	Ottawa	National	Canada
1913	United States Soccer Federation	Chicago	National	United States

=== Central American Zone (UNCAF) ===
Date	Name	Location	National or Regional	Country
1919	National Football Federation of Guatemala	Guatemala City	National	Guatemala
1921	Costa Rican Football Federation	San José	National	Costa Rica
1931	Nicaraguan Football Federation	Managua	National	Nicaragua
1935	Salvadoran Football Association	San Salvador	National	El Salvador
1937	Panamanian Football Federation	Panama City	National	Panama
1951	National Autonomous Federation of Football of Honduras	Tegucigalpa	National	Honduras
1980	Football Federation of Belize	Belmopan	National	Belize

=== Caribbean Zone (CFU) ===
Date	Name	Location	National or Regional	Country
1902	Guyana Football Federation	Georgetown	National	Guyana
1904	Haitian Football Federation	Port-au-Prince	National	Haiti
1908	Trinidad and Tobago Football Federation	Port of Spain	National	Trinidad and Tobago
1910	Barbados Football Association	Bridgetown	National	Barbados
1910	Jamaica Football Federation	Kingston	National	Jamaica
1920	Surinamese Football Association	Paramaribo	National	Suriname
1924	Football Association of Cuba	Havana	National	Cuba
1924	Grenada Football Association	St. George's	National	Grenada
1928	Antigua and Barbuda Football Association	St. John's	National	Antigua and Barbuda
1928	Bermuda Football Association	Devonshire Parish	National	Bermuda
1932	Aruba Football Federation	Noord	National	Aruba
1932	Saint Kitts and Nevis Football Association	Basseterre	National	Saint Kitts and Nevis
1940	Puerto Rican Football Federation	San Juan	National	Puerto Rico
1953	Dominican Football Federation	Santo Domingo	National	Dominican Republic
1953	Ligue de football de la Martinique	Fort-de-France	National	Martinique
1961	Guadeloupean League of Football	Pointe-à-Pitre	National	Guadeloupe
1962	Ligue de football de la Guyane	Cayenne	National	French Guiana
1966	Cayman Islands Football Association	Grand Cayman	National	Cayman Islands
1967	Bahamas Football Association	Nassau	National	Bahamas
1970	Dominica Football Association	Roseau	National	Dominica
1973	Montserrat Football Association	Plymouth	National	Montserrat
1974	British Virgin Islands Football Association	Tortola	National	British Virgin Islands
1979	Saint Lucia Football Association	Castries	National	Saint Lucia
1979	Saint Vincent and the Grenadines Football Federation	Kingstown	National	Saint Vincent and the Grenadines
1986	Sint Maarten Soccer Association	Philipsburg	National	Sint Maarten
1989	U.S. Virgin Islands Soccer Federation	Christiansted	National	U.S. Virgin Islands
1990	Anguilla Football Association	The Valley	National	Anguilla
1996	Turks and Caicos Islands Football Association	Providenciales	National	Turks and Caicos Islands
2010	Curaçao Football Federation	Willemstad	National	Curaçao

== South America (CONMEBOL) ==
Date	Name	Location	National or Regional	Country
1893	Argentine Football Association	Buenos Aires	National	Argentina
1895	Chilean Football Federation	Santiago de Chile	National	Chile
1900	Uruguayan Football Association	Montevideo	National	Uruguay
1906	Paraguayan Football Association	Asunción	National	Paraguay
1914	Brazilian Football Confederation	Rio de Janeiro	National	Brazil
1922	Peruvian Football Federation	Lima	National	Peru
1924	Colombian Football Federation	Barranquilla	National	Colombia
1925	Bolivian Football Federation	Cochabamba	National	Bolivia
1925	Ecuadorian Football Federation	Quito	National	Ecuador
1926	Venezuelan Football Federation	Caracas	National	Venezuela

== Africa (CAF) ==
=== Union of North African Football Federations (UNAF) ===
Date	Name	Location	National or Regional	Country
1921	Egyptian Football Association	Cairo	National	Egypt
1955	Royal Moroccan Football Federation	Rabat	National	Morocco
1956	Tunisian Football Federation	Tunis	National	Tunisia
1962	Algerian Football Federation	Algiers	National	Algeria
1962	Libyan Football Federation	Tripoli	National	Libya

=== West Africa Football Union (WAFU) ===
Date	Name	Location	National or Regional	Country
1936	Liberia Football Association	Monrovia	National	Liberia
1945	Nigeria Football Federation	Abuja	National	Nigeria
1952	Gambia Football Association	Bakau	National	Gambia
1957	Ghana Football Association	Accra	National	Ghana
1960	Burkinabé Football Federation	Ouagadougou	National	Burkina Faso
1960	Guinean Football Federation	Conakry	National	Guinea
1960	Ivorian Football Federation	Abidjan	National	Ivory Coast
1960	Malian Football Federation	Bamako	National	Mali
1960	Senegalese Football Federation	Dakar	National	Senegal
1960	Togolese Football Federation	Lomé	National	Togo
1961	Football Federation of the Islamic Republic of Mauritania	Nouakchott	National	Mauritania
1962	Benin Football Federation	Cotonou	National	Benin
1967	Nigerien Football Federation	Niamey	National	Niger
1967	Sierra Leone Football Association	Freetown	National	Sierra Leone
1974	Football Federation of Guinea-Bissau	Bissau	National	Guinea-Bissau
1982	Cape Verdean Football Federation	Praia	National	Cape Verde

=== Council for East and Central Africa Football Associations (CECAFA) ===
Date	Name	Location	National or Regional	Country
1924	Federation of Uganda Football Associations	Kampala	National	Uganda
1926	Zanzibar Football Association	Zanzibar City	National	Zanzibar
1930	Tanzania Football Federation	Dar es Salaam	National	Tanzania
1936	Sudan Football Association	Khartoum	National	Sudan
1943	Ethiopian Football Federation	Addis Ababa	National	Ethiopia
1948	Football Federation of Burundi	Bujumbura	National	Burundi
1950	Somali Football Federation	Mogadishu	National	Somalia
1960	Kenya Football Federation	Nairobi	National	Kenya
1972	Rwandese Association Football Federation	Kigali	National	Rwanda
1979	Djiboutian Football Federation	Djibouti City	National	Djibouti
1992	Eritrean National Football Federation	Asmara	National	Eritrea
2011	South Sudan Football Association	Juba	National	South Sudan

=== Central African Football Federations' Union (UNIFFAC) ===
Date	Name	Location	National or Regional	Country
1919	Congolese Association Football Federation	Kinshasa	National	DR Congo
1959	Cameroonian Football Federation	Yaoundé	National	Cameroon
1960	Equatoguinean Football Federation	Malabo	National	Equatorial Guinea
1961	Central African Football Federation	Bangui	National	Central African Republic
1962	Chadian Football Federation	N'Djamena	National	Chad
1962	Congolese Football Federation	Brazzaville	National	Congo
1962	Gabonese Football Federation	Libreville	National	Gabon
1975	São Toméan Football Federation	São Tomé	National	São Tomé and Príncipe

=== Council of Southern Africa Football Associations (COSAFA) ===
Date	Name	Location	National or Regional	Country
1929	Football Association of Zambia	Lusaka	National	Zambia
1932	Lesotho Football Association	Maseru	National	Lesotho
1952	Mauritius Football Association	Plaines Wilhems District	National	Mauritius
1961	Malagasy Football Federation	Antananarivo	National	Madagascar
1965	Zimbabwe Football Association	Harare	National	Zimbabwe
1966	Football Association of Malawi	Chiwembe	National	Malawi
1968	Eswatini Football Association	Mbabane	National	Eswatini
1970	Botswana Football Association	Gaborone	National	Botswana
1975	Mozambican Football Federation	Maputo	National	Mozambique
1979	Angolan Football Federation	Luanda	National	Angola
1979	Comoros Football Federation	Mitsamiouli	National	Comoros
1979	Seychelles Football Federation	Mahé	National	Seychelles
1991	South African Football Association	Johannesburg	National	South Africa
1992	Namibia Football Association	Windhoek	National	Namibia

== Asia (AFC) ==
=== ASEAN Football Federation (AFF) ===
Date	Name	Location	National or Regional	Country
1892	Football Association of Singapore	Kallang	National	Singapore
1907	Philippine Football Federation	Pasig	National	Philippines
1916	Football Association of Thailand	Bangkok	National	Thailand
1930	Football Association of Indonesia	Jakarta	National	Indonesia
1933	Football Federation of Cambodia	Phnom Penh	National	Cambodia
1933	Football Association of Malaysia	Kelana Jaya	National	Malaysia
1947	Myanmar Football Federation	Yangon	National	Myanmar
1951	Lao Football Federation	Vientiane	National	Laos
1961	Football Australia	Sydney	National	Australia
1962	Vietnam Football Federation	Hanoi	National	Vietnam
2002	East Timor Football Federation	Dili	National	East Timor

=== East Asian Football Federation (EAFF) ===
Date	Name	Location	National or Regional	Country
1914	Hong Kong Football Association	Ho Man Tin	National	Hong Kong
1921	Japan Football Association	Tokyo	National	Japan
1924	Chinese Football Association	Peking	National	China
1928	Korea Football Association	Seoul	National	South Korea
1936	Chinese Taipei Football Association	New Taipei City	National	Chinese Taipei
1939	Macau Football Association	Macau	National	Macau
1945	DPR Korea Football Association	Pyongyang	National	North Korea
1959	Mongolian Football Federation	Ulaanbaatar	National	Mongolia
1975	Guam Football Association	Barrigada	National	Guam
2005	Northern Mariana Islands Football Association	Saipan	National	Northern Mariana Islands

=== Central Asian Football Association (CAFA) ===
Date	Name	Location	National or Regional	Country
1922	Afghanistan Football Federation	Kabul	National	Afghanistan
1936	Tajikistan National Football Federation	Dushanbe	National	Tajikistan
1946	Football Federation Islamic Republic of Iran	Tehran	National	Iran
1946	Uzbekistan Football Federation	Tashkent	National	Uzbekistan
1992	Football Association of Turkmenistan	Ashgabat	National	Turkmenistan
1992	Football Federation of Kyrgyz Republic	Bishkek	National	Kyrgyzstan

=== South Asian Football Federation (SAFF) ===
Date	Name	Location	National or Regional	Country
1937	All India Football Federation	New Delhi	National	India
1939	Football Sri Lanka	Colombo	National	Sri Lanka
1947	Pakistan Football Federation	Lahore	National	Pakistan
1951	All Nepal Football Association	Lalitpur	National	Nepal
1972	Bangladesh Football Federation	Dhaka	National	Bangladesh
1982	Football Association of Maldives	Malé	National	Maldives
1983	Bhutan Football Federation	Thimphu	National	Bhutan

=== West Asian Football Federation (WAFF) ===
Date	Name	Location	National or Regional	Country
1928	Palestinian Football Association	Jerusalem	National	Palestine
1933	Federation Libanaise de Football	Beirut	National	Lebanon
1936	Syrian Football Association	Damascus	National	Syria
1948	Iraq Football Association	Baghdad	National	Iraq
1949	Jordan Football Association	Amman	National	Jordan
1952	Kuwait Football Association	Kuwait City	National	Kuwait
1956	Saudi Arabia Football Federation	Riyadh	National	Saudi Arabia
1957	Bahrain Football Association	Manama	National	Bahrain
1960	Qatar Football Association	Doha	National	Qatar
1962	Yemen Football Association	Sana'a	National	Yemen
1971	United Arab Emirates Football Association	Abu Dhabi	National	United Arab Emirates
1978	Oman Football Association	Muscat	National	Oman

== Oceania (OFC) ==
Date	Name	Location	National or Regional	Country
1891	New Zealand Football	Auckland	National	New Zealand
1928	New Caledonian Football Federation	Noumea	National	New Caledonia
1934	Vanuatu Football Federation	Port Vila	National	Vanuatu
1938	Fiji Football Association	Suva	National	Fiji
1938	Tahitian Football Federation	Pirae	National	Tahiti
1962	Papua New Guinea Football Association	Port Moresby	National	Papua New Guinea
1965	Tonga Football Association	Nuku'alofa	National	Tonga
1968	Football Federation Samoa	Apia	National	Samoa
1971	Cook Islands Football Association	Avarua	National	Cook Islands
1978	Solomon Islands Football Federation	Honiara	National	Solomon Islands
1980	Kiribati Islands Football Association	South Tarawa	National	Kiribati
1984	Football Federation American Samoa	Pago Pago	National	American Samoa

== See also ==
- List of football federations
