= Mengíbar =

- Municipality
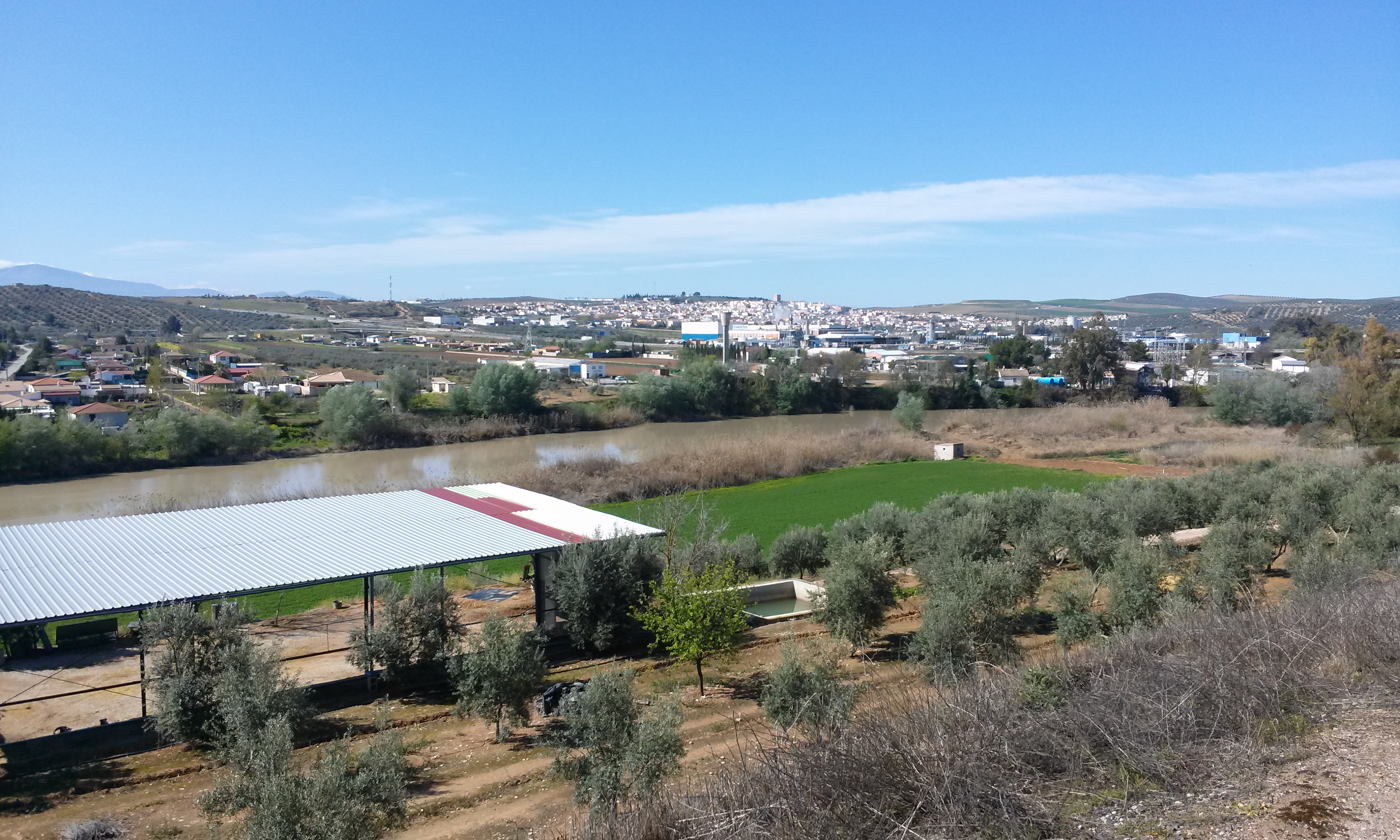
- Guadalquivir river and the town of Mengíbar behind

- Flag Coat of arms

- Location in the Province of Jaén Mengíbar (Andalusia) Mengíbar (Spain)
- Coordinates: 37°58′06″N 03°48′32″W
- Country: Spain
- Autonomous community: Andalusia
- Province: Jaén

Area
  - Total: 62.35 km^{2} (24.07 sq mi)
- Elevation: 323 m (1,060 ft)

Population (2025-01-01)
  - Total: 10,250
  - Density: 164.4/km^{2} (425.8/sq mi)
- Time zone: UTC+1 (CET)
  - Summer (DST): UTC+2 (CEST)

Mengíbar is municipality of Spain belonging to the province of Jaén, in the autonomous community of Andalusia. The municipality has a total area of 62.34 km^{2} and, as of 1 January 2022, it has a registered population of 9,965.

== History ==
Lying on the point where the Guadalbullón flows into the Guadalquivir river and also close to the Guadalimar, the nearby Iberian oppidum of Illiturgi (Cerro de la Muela) was besieged and destroyed by Scipio Africanus in 206 BCE during the Second Punic War.

Mengíbar was conquered by Ferdinand III of Castile together with other neighbouring fortified places as a part of the preliminary steps leading to the 1246 siege of Jaén. It was a hamlet belonging to the land of Jaén in the lower Middle Ages. It segregated from the land of Jaén in 1574.

== Sports ==
- CD Mengíbar (2008), association football club

== See also ==
- List of municipalities in Jaén
