= Lemense Futebol Clube =

Lemense FC
- Full name: Lemense Futebol Clube (2022–); Sport Club Atibaia (2005–2021)
- Nickname: Azulão
- Founded: 12 December 2005
- Ground: Estádio Bruno Lazzarini
- Capacity: 7.000
- President: Alexandre Barbosa
- 2022: Paulista A2, 9th of 16
Home colours	Away colours

Lemense Futebol Clube, commonly referred to as Lemense FC, is professional association football club based in Leme, São Paulo, Brazil. The team competed in Campeonato Paulista Série A2, the second tier of the São Paulo state football league.

== History ==
The club was founded on 12 December 2005 as Sport Club Atibaia, and professionalized its football department in the same year, when they competed in their first professional competition, the Campeonato Paulista Segunda Divisão. They achieved promotion to the Campeonato Paulista Série A3 in 2014, and reached another promotion to the Campeonato Paulista Série A2 in 2018, the latter as champions.

On 29 November 2021, Atibaia's president Alexandre Barbosa confirmed that the club would leave the city of Atibaia and move to Leme instead, taking over the name, shield and identity of Esporte Clube Lemense.

== Stadium ==
Lemense FC play their home games at Estádio Bruno Lazzarini.

== Honours ==
- Campeonato Paulista Série A3:
  - Winners (1): 2018.
