= CD Atlético Mengíbar =

Spanish football team

Atlético Mengíbar
- Full name: Club Deportivo Atlético Mengíbar
- Founded: 2008
- Ground: Estadio Ramón Díaz López, Mengíbar, Andalusia, Spain
- Capacity: 2,000
- Chairman: (Spain) Juan Lavirgen Gómez
- Manager: (Spain) Ismael Almazán
- League: Segunda Andaluza Jaén – Group 1
- 2025–26: Segunda Andaluza Jaén – Group 1, 4th of 11
Home colours	Away colours

Club Deportivo Atlético Mengíbar is a football team based in Mengíbar. Founded in 2008 in the place of Mengíbar CF, the team plays in Segunda Andaluza Jaén – Group 1. The club's home ground is Estadio Ramón Díaz López.

== History ==
Mengíbar CF was founded in 1976. In the 2008–09 season, the team retired from the Tercera División, and CD Atlético Mengíbar was founded.

=== Background ===
- Mengíbar CF - (1976–2008)
- CD Atlético Mengíbar - (2008–)

== Season to season ==
Season	Tier	Division	Place	Copa del Rey
2008–09	7	1ª Prov.	3rd	
2009–10	7	1ª Prov.	4th	
2010–11	7	1ª Prov.	8th	
2011–12	7	1ª Prov.	5th	
2012–2017	DNP			
2017–18	7	2ª And.	7th	
2018–19	7	2ª And.	11th	
2019–20	7	2ª And.	12th	
2020–21	7	2ª And.	6th	
2021–22	8	2ª And.	5th	
2022–23	8	2ª And.	1st	
2023–24	7	1ª And.	14th	
2024–25	8	2ª And.	3rd	
2025–26	8	2ª And.		
