= Sangkulirang F.C. =

Indonesian football club

Sangkulirang
- Full name: Sangkulirang Football Club
- Nicknames: Laskar Pesisir; Laskar Benua Baru
- Founded: 2005; 21 years ago, as Tho Lere Sangkulirang FC; 2023; 3 years ago as Sangkulirang Football Club
- Ground: Sangkulirang Football Field, East Kutai, East Kalimantan
- Capacity: 500
- Owner: Irwan Fecho
- Manager: Arfan Matong
- Coach: Rully Padengke
- League: Liga 4
- 2023–24: 2nd, (East Kalimantan Zone)
Home colours	Away colours

Sangkulirang Football Club is an Indonesian football club based in Sangkulirang, East Kutai Regency, East Kalimantan. They currently compete in the Liga 4 East Kalimantan zone.

== Honours ==
- Liga 3 East Kalimantan
  - Runner-up (1): 2023–24
