= Estádio Bruno Lazzarini =

Soccer stadium in Leme, São Paulo, Brazil

- Brunão
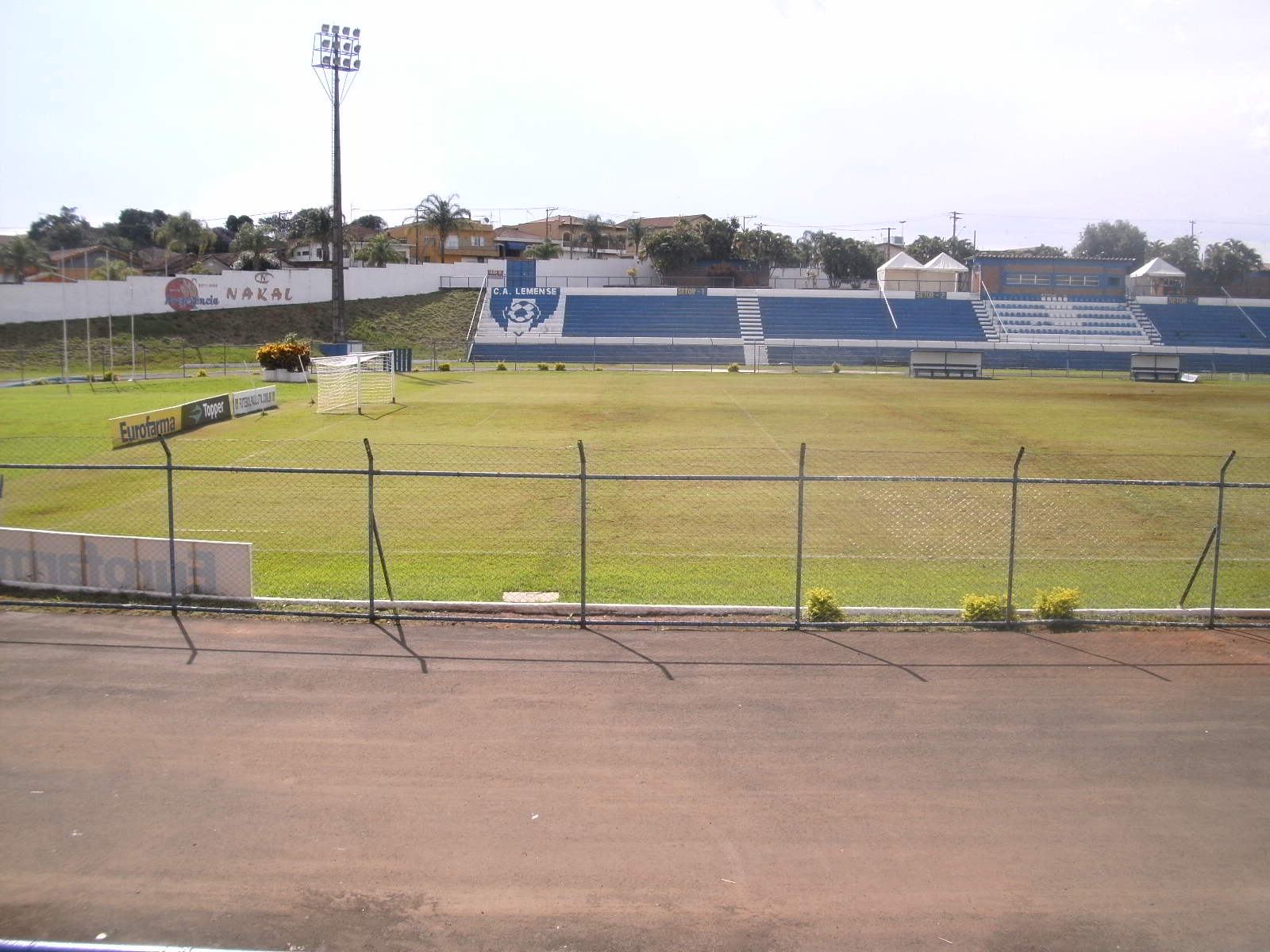
- Interactive map of Estádio Bruno Lazzarini
- Full name: Estádio Municipal Bruno Lazzarini
- Location: Leme, São Paulo state, Brazil
- Coordinates: 22.176401767242407°S 47.38909150715901°W
- Owner: Leme Municipality
- Capacity: 7,000
- Surface: Natural grass
- Field size: 105 by 68 metres (114.8 yd × 74.4 yd)

Construction
- Opened: November 30, 1980

Tenant
- Lemense FC

Estádio Bruno Lazzarini (Bruno Lazzarini Stadium) is an association football stadium in Leme, on the countryside of São Paulo, Brazil. The stadium holds 7.000 people. It was inaugurated in 1980.

It is the currently venue of Lemense FC (former SC Atibaia) that moved from Atibaia to Leme in 2022. Around the football (soccer) field there is a running track.
