= Persikukar Kutai Kartanegara =

Indonesian football club

Persikukar
- Full name: Persatuan Sepakbola Indonesia Kutai Kartanegara
- Nickname: Laskar Lembuswana (Lembuswana Warriors)
- Founded: 1978; 48 years ago
- Ground: Rondong Demang Stadium
- Capacity: 10,000
- Owner: PSSI Kutai Kartanegara
- Chairman: Rendi Solihin
- League: Liga 4
- 2023: Liga 3, withdrew

Persatuan Sepakbola Indonesia Kutai Kartanegara, commonly known as Persikukar, is an Indonesian football club based in Kutai Kartanegara, East Kalimantan. They currently compete in Liga 4 East Kalimantan zone and their homebase is Rondong Demang Stadium.

The club is a continuation of the club Persiku Kutai, representing the Kutai Region before it was finally split into three regencies, namely Kutai Kartanegara, East Kutai, and West Kutai.
