= Kartanegara F.C. =

Indonesian football club

Kartanegara
- Full name: Kartanegara Football Club
- Nickname: Singa Habang (The Red Lions)
- Founded: 2021; 5 years ago, as Mesra FC; 15 December 2023; 2 years ago, as Kartanegara FC
- Ground: Rondong Demang Stadium
- Capacity: 10,000
- Owner: Kutai Kartanegara Government
- Chairman: Thauhid Aprilian Noor
- Manager: Edi Fahruddin
- Coach: Albert Rudiana
- League: Liga 4
- 2023–24: 1st (East Kalimantan zone); First round, 4th in Group K (National phase)
Home colours	Away colours	Third colours

Kartanegara Football Club (simply known as Kartanegara FC, or previously known as Mesra FC) is an Indonesian football club based in Kutai Kartanegara, East Kalimantan. They currently compete in the Liga 4 East Kalimantan zone.

== History ==
The club was originally established in 2021 as Mesra FC, based in Samarinda. During its early years, it functioned as an amateur side competing in the lower divisions of the East Kalimantan regional league.

On 15 December 2023, the club underwent a major transformation after being acquired and relocated to Kutai Kartanegara. It was officially rebranded as Kartanegara FC during a launch ceremony attended by the Regent of Kutai Kartanegara, Edi Damansyah. The rebranding included a change of colors to red and black, and the adoption of the nickname Singa Habang (The Red Lions).

To strengthen the squad for the 2023–24 Liga 3 season, the management recruited veteran professional players with experience in Liga 1, including former players from Persija Jakarta and Persib Bandung. The club saw immediate success by winning the Liga 3 East Kalimantan zone in early 2024. However, in the National Phase, they were eliminated in the first round after finishing 4th in Group K. Following the 2024 PSSI restructuring, the club was placed in the fourth-tier Liga 4.

== Honours ==
- Liga 3 East Kalimantan
  - (gold) Champions (1): 2023–24
