= Persikubar Putra =

Indonesian football club

- Full name: Persatuan Sepakbola Indonesia Kutai Barat Putra
- Nickname: Macan Dahan
- Founded: 2021; 5 years ago
- Ground: Swalas Gunaaq Stadium
- Capacity: 15,000
- Owner: PSSI West Kutai
- Chairman: Hengki
- Coach: Victor Simon
- League: Liga 4
- 2023: 5th, North District (East Kalimantan)
Home colours	Away colours

Persatuan Sepakbola Indonesia Kutai Barat Putra (simply known as Persikubar Putra) is an Indonesian football club based in Sendawar, West Kutai Regency, East Kalimantan. They currently compete in Liga 4 East Kalimantan zone.

Persikubar Putra is a phoenix club of Persikubar West Kutai after the original club moved their homebase and changed the name to Persebaya DU in 2010, and now the club known as Bhayangkara FC.
