= 2006 CEMAC Cup =

Tournament details
- Host country: Equatorial Guinea
- Teams: 6 (from 1 confederation)

Final positions
- Champions: Equatorial Guinea (1st title)
- Runners-up: Cameroon
- Third place: Gabon

Tournament statistics
- Matches played: 10
- Goals scored: 18 (1.8 per match)
- Top scorer: (Gabon) Georges Akieremy (2)

The 2006 CEMAC Cup was the third edition of the CEMAC Cup, the football championship of Central African nations.

The tournament was held in the Equatorial Guinea.

== First stage ==
=== Group A ===
Team	Pts	Pld	W	D	L	GF	GA
Equatorial Guinea	4	2	1	1	0	3	2
Chad	2	2	0	2	0	1	1
Congo	1	2	0	1	1	1	2

March 4, 2006	Equatorial Guinea	2–1	Congo
March 6, 2006	Equatorial Guinea	1–1	Chad
March 9, 2006	Congo	0–0	Chad

=== Group B ===
Team	Pts	Pld	W	D	L	GF	GA
Cameroon (Amateur team)	4	2	1	1	0	2	0
Gabon	2	2	0	2	0	2	2
Central African Republic	1	2	0	1	1	2	4

March 4, 2006	(Amateur team) Cameroon	0–0	Gabon
March 6, 2006	(Amateur team) Cameroon	2–0	Central African Republic
March 9, 2006	Gabon	2–2	Central African Republic

== Knockout stage ==
All matches in the knockout stage were played in Bata.

=== Semi-finals ===
March 11, 2006	Equatorial Guinea	0–0	Gabon
		(4–2 pen)
March 11, 2006	(Amateur team) Cameroon	1–0	Chad

=== 3rd place playoff ===
March 14, 2006	Chad	2–2	Gabon
		(6–7 pen)

=== Final ===
March 14, 2006

Equatorial Guinea	1 – 1	Cameroon (Amateur team)
Mpanga 30'		Moukoko 70'
Penalties
	4 – 2

Estadio La Libertad, Bata
Attendance: 7,000
Referee: Alain Poungui (Congo)

2006 CEMAC Cup

Equatorial Guinea
First title
