= 2025 Liga Nusantara final =

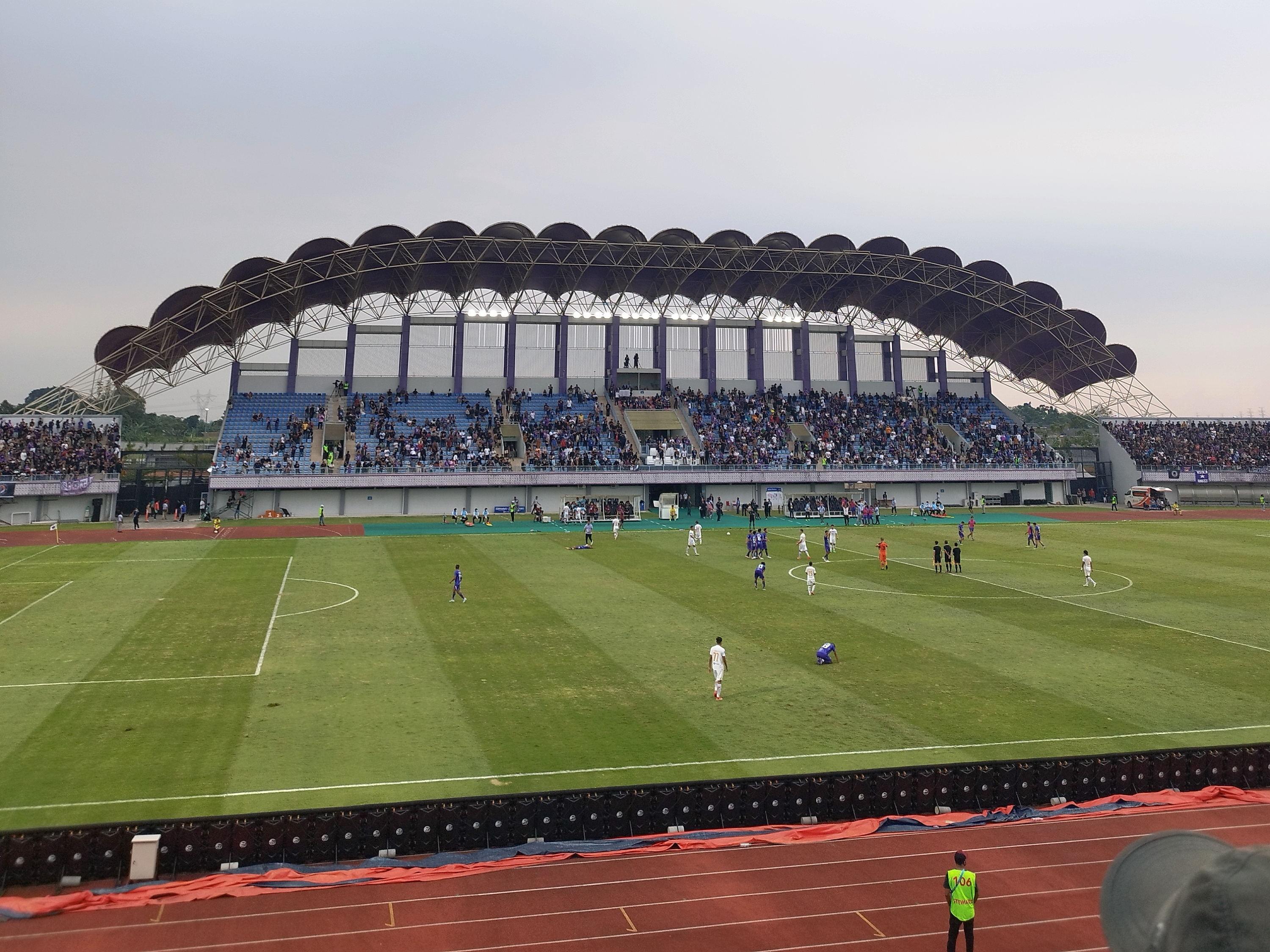
- The final match was held at Indomilk Arena
- Event: 2024–25 Liga Nusantara
Tornado	Sumut United
1	4
- Date: 27 February 2025
- Venue: Indomilk Arena, Tangerang
- Referee: Yeni Krisdianto
- Attendance: 0

The 2025 Liga Nusantara final was the final match of the 2024–25 Liga Nusantara, the 9th season of third-tier competition in Indonesia organised by PT Liga Indonesia Baru, and the inaugural season since it was renamed from the Liga 3 to the Liga Nusantara. It was held at the Indomilk Arena in Tangerang, Banten on 27 February 2025.

== Background ==
=== Tornado ===
Since its establishment, Tornado has never reached the final of a third-tier league, making this season their best ever.

=== Sumut United ===
Since the establishment of Liga 3 as the third-tier league, Sumut United has reached the final once, in the 2022 Liga 3 final, where they drew 3–3 in normal time and won 4–2 in a penalty shoot-out against Putra Delta Sidoarjo. At that time, they were still known as Karo United.

=== Previous finals ===
Team	Previous final appearances (bold indicates winners)
Tornado	None
Sumut United	1 (**2022**)

== Route to the final ==
Tornado
Round
Sumut United
**Group A** **winner**

Pos	Team	Pld	Pts
**1**	Tornado	**14**	**29**
2	Sumut United	14	**26**
3	PSGC	14	**26**
4	Persikab	14	**22**
5	PCB Persipasi	14	**20**

Source: Liga Nusantara 2024–25
Regular round
**Group A** **runner-up**

Pos	Team	Pld	Pts
1	Tornado	14	**29**
**2**	Sumut United	**14**	**26**
3	PSGC	14	**26**
4	Persikab	14	**22**
5	PCB Persipasi	14	**20**

Source: Liga Nusantara 2024–25
**Group X** **winner**

Pos	Team	Pld	Pts
**1**	Tornado (P)	**4**	**10**
2	PSGC	4	**4**
3	Persekabpas	4	**3**

Source: Liga Nusantara 2024–25
(P) Promoted
Championship round
**Group Y** **winner**

Pos	Team	Pld	Pts
**1**	Sumut United (P)	**4**	**7**
2	Persiba Balikpapan (O, P)	4	**7**
3	NZR Sumbersari	4	**2**

Source: Liga Nusantara 2024–25
(O) Play-off winners; (P) Promoted

== Format ==
The final will be played as a single match. If tied after regulation time, extra time and, if necessary, a penalty shoot-out will be used to decide the winning team.

== Match ==
27 February 2025
19:00 UTC+7

Tornado	1–4	Sumut United
Yoga 14'	Report	29', 42' Gagarin; 51' Aulia; 81' Nico Sitepu

Indomilk Arena, Tangerang
Attendance: 0
Referee: Yeni Krisdianto

**Tornado**	**Sumut United**

GK	90	(Indonesia) Mohammad Yudha
RB	53	(Indonesia) Putra Ramadhan		(substituted off) HT'
CB	5	(Indonesia) Yoga Pratama
CB	26	(Indonesia) Rio Valentino		(substituted off) 56'
LB	7	(Indonesia) Difo Prasetya	(yellow card) 18'
CM	12	(Indonesia) Aprianto	(yellow card) 77'
AM	30	(Indonesia) Feri Aman Saragih (c)		(substituted off) 79'
AM	8	(Indonesia) Sandi Septian		(substituted off) 56'
RW	28	(Indonesia) Marius Ahoren		(substituted off) 79'
LW	31	(Indonesia) Muhammad Ferdiansa
CF	19	(Indonesia) Yanuar Baehaki
Substitutions:
GK	25	(Indonesia) Ababil Syahbela
CB	4	(Indonesia) Fernando Lekatompessy		(substituted on) 56'
CM	6	(Indonesia) Derry Herlangga
LW	10	(Indonesia) Rendhi Saputra
AM	15	(Indonesia) Lasami Laode		(substituted on) 56'
RB	16	(Indonesia) Dio Samudra		(substituted on) HT'
LB	18	(Indonesia) Riki Pradana
RW	20	(Indonesia) Saiful Arifin		(substituted on) 79'
CM	77	(Indonesia) Adib Nasution
CF	99	(Indonesia) Saeful Abdul		(substituted on) 79'
Manager:
(Indonesia) I Wayan Sukadana

GK	97	(Indonesia) Muhammad Irfan c)
RB	32	(Indonesia) Bagas Prasetyo
CB	4	(Indonesia) Rifki Wahyudi		(substituted off) HT'
CB	5	(Indonesia) Reza Lubis
LB	15	(Indonesia) Luthfi Anshorri
DM	17	(Indonesia) Yuda Risky		(substituted off) HT'
CM	8	(Indonesia) Jalesh Gagarin		(substituted off) 78'
CM	16	(Indonesia) Ghozali Aufathul
RM	21	(Indonesia) Nico Sitepu
LM	33	(Indonesia) Mansiz Minarta	(yellow card) 90+1'	(substituted off) 90+4'
CF	37	(Indonesia) Wiraja Aulia	(yellow card) 85'	(substituted off) 86'
Substitutions:
GK	29	(Indonesia) Ikram Butarbutar
RB	3	(Indonesia) Handoko	(yellow card) 90+5'	(substituted on) 90+4'
RW	7	(Indonesia) Hamzah Deva		(substituted on) HT'
CF	10	(Indonesia) Ahmad Rifai
RB	12	(Indonesia) Ismawan
RB	14	(Indonesia) Nur Kholis
CB	18	(Indonesia) Aditya Saputra		(substituted on) HT'
LM	20	(Indonesia) Andi Sitepu		(substituted on) 78'
CF	44	(Indonesia) Faisal Ramadoni		(substituted on) 86'
RW	88	(Indonesia) Kevin Armedyah
Manager:
(Indonesia) Ridwan Saragih

Assistant referees:
Ahmad Fauzy
Sholidin Usman
Fourth official:
Kemal Pasha

**Match rules**

- 90 minutes
- 30 minutes of extra time if tied after normal time
- Penalty shoot-out if still tied after extra time
- Ten named substitutes, of which up to five may be used, with a sixth allowed in extra time.

== See also ==
- 2024–25 Liga Nusantara
