= Sedek Tuakia =

Indonesian footballer (born 2001)

Personal information
- Full name: Sedek Tuakia
- Date of birth: 10 December 2001 (age 24)
- Place of birth: Pelauw, Indonesia
- Height: 1.67 m (5 ft 6 in)
- Position: Midfielder

Team information
- Current team: Persikad Depok
- Number: 95

Youth career
- 2018–2019: Nusantara Masohi
- 2019: PS Pelauw Putra
- 2019: Bhayangkara

Senior career*
| Years | Team | Apps | (Gls) |
| 2020 | Bhayangkara | 0 | (0) |
| 2021–2022 | → Deltras (loan) | 15 | (2) |
| 2024–2026 | Perserang Serang | 27 | (2) |
| 2026– | Persikad Depok | 5 | (0) |
- * Club domestic league appearances and goals as of 24 October 2026

Sedek Tuakia (born 10 December 2001) is an Indonesian professional footballer who plays as a midfielder for Championship club Persikad Depok.

== Club career ==
=== Early career and Bhayangkara ===
Sedek was born in Pelauw, a village located on Haruku Island, Central Maluku Regency. He began his youth football development when he joined the academy system of Bhayangkara in 2019. Following his impressive performances with the Elite Pro Academy squad, head coach Paul Munster promoted Sedek alongside teammate Ichwan Tuharea to the senior first-team roster in early 2020. He was included in the club's squad list for the East Java Governor's Cup pre-season tournament and the 2020 Liga 1 campaign.

=== Loan to Deltras ===
In November 2021, Sedek was loaned out to Deltras. He became an integral part of the team's campaign in the national stages of 2021–22 Liga 3. During the national round in February 2022, Sedek provided an assist to Martinus Novianto in a 1–0 victory over Tornado Pekanbaru. Later that month, he scored the third goal in a 4–0 triumph against Gasma Enrekang, which secured Deltras's advancement to the Round of 16 and eventually their promotion to 2022–23 Liga 2.

=== Perserang Serang ===
Following his successful loan spell, Sedek permanently transferred to Perserang Serang for the 2024–25 Liga Nusantara competition. On 13 December 2024, he made his league debut for the club, coming on as a substitute in a 3–1 away loss to PSGC Ciamis at UNS Stadium, Surakarta. Six days later, he made his first start in a 0–1 won to Persikab Bandung.

On 6 February 2025, he scored his first league goal for Perserang, as they won 5–0 against PSM Madiun in the Liga Nusantara relegation playoffs. Four days later, he scored the opening goal in a 1–3 victory over Persipasi Kota Bekasi at Ngurah Rai Stadium. Sedek finished the season with two goals in 14 league appearances. In August 2025, he extended his contract with the club for the 2025–26 Liga Nusantara season.

=== Persikad Depok ===
Ahead of the 2026–27 season, Sedek signed a contract with Championship club Persikad Depok.
