= Derry Herlangga =

Indonesian footballer

Personal information
- Full name: Derry Herlangga
- Date of birth: 12 July 1995 (age 31)
- Place of birth: Jakarta, Indonesia
- Height: 1.70 m (5 ft 7 in)
- Position: Full-back

Team information
- Current team: Sriwijaya
- Number: 3

Youth career
- 2016: PS TNI

Senior career*
Years	Team	Apps	(Gls)
2016	PS TNI	0	(0)
2017	PSMS Medan	16	(0)
2018–2019	TIRA-Persikabo	5	(0)
2020	Sriwijaya	1	(0)
2021	Muba Babel United	9	(0)
2022	Putra Delta Sidoarjo	5	(0)
2023–2024	PSCS Cilacap	10	(0)
2024–2025	Tornado	12	(0)
2025	PSB Bogor	5	(0)
2026–	Sriwijaya	10	(0)
- * Club domestic league appearances and goals as of 2 May 2026

Derry Herlangga (born 12 July 1995) is an Indonesian professional footballer who plays as a full-back for Championship club Sriwijaya.

== Career ==
=== PS TIRA (TIRA-Persikabo) ===
In 2018, Derry signed a contract with Indonesian Liga 1 club PS TIRA. He made his league debut on 21 April 2018 against PSM Makassar at the Andi Mattalatta Stadium, Makassar.

=== Sriwijaya ===
He was signed for Sriwijaya to play in Liga 2 in the 2020 season. This season was suspended on 27 March 2020 due to the COVID-19 pandemic. The season was abandoned and was declared void on 20 January 2021.

=== Muba Babel United ===
In 2021, Derry signed a contract with Indonesian Liga 2 club Muba Babel United. He made his league debut on 6 October 2021 against Sriwijaya at the Gelora Sriwijaya Stadium, Palembang.

== Honours ==
=== Club ===
PS TNI U-21

- Indonesia Soccer Championship U-21: 2016

PSMS Medan

- Liga 2 runner-up: 2017

Tornado FC

- Liga Nusantara runner-up: 2024–25
