= Yudi Safrizal =

Indonesian footballer

Personal information
- Full name: Muhammad Yudi Safrizal
- Date of birth: 9 June 1999 (age 27)
- Place of birth: Medan, Indonesia
- Height: 1.79 m (5 ft 10 in)
- Position: Centre-back

Team information
- Current team: Persikad Depok
- Number: 32

Youth career
- 2019: PON Sumut

Senior career*
Years	Team	Apps	(Gls)
2018–2019	Karo United		
2021–2022	Persipa Pati	3	(0)
2023	PSIS Semarang	1	(0)
2023–2024	→ Persipa Pati (loan)	15	(0)
2024–2025	Nusantara Lampung	17	(1)
2025–	Persikad Depok	17	(2)
- * Club domestic league appearances and goals as of 3 October 2026

Muhammad Yudi Safrizal (born 9 June 1999) is an Indonesian professional footballer who plays as a centre-back for Championship club Persikad Depok.

== Early life ==
Yudi was born in 1999 in Medan, North Sumatra.

== Club career ==
=== Youth career ===
As a youth player, Yudi joined PON Sumut.

=== Karo United F.C. ===
In 2018, Yudi joined Karo United in the Liga 3 competition.

=== Persipa Pati ===
In 2021, Yudi is contracted by Persipa Pati to sail in Liga 2. He made three league appearances for Persipa Pati.

=== PSIS Semarang ===
PSIS Semarang completes the list of players for the second round of the 2022–23 Liga 1. On the last day of player registration, PSIS officially registered two players at once, namely striker Rizky Dwi Pangestu and stopper Muhammad Yudi Safrizal.

Yudi made his professional debut on 12 March 2023 in a match against Borneo Samarinda at the Segiri Stadium, Samarinda.

== Style of play ==
Yudi mainly operates as a defender.

== Career statistics ==
=== Club ===
As of 3 October 2026

Club	Season	League			Cup		Continental		Other		Total	
Club	Season	Division	Apps	Goals	Apps	Goals	Apps	Goals	Apps	Goals	Apps	Goals
Persipa Pati	2021–22	Liga 2	0	0	0	0	–		0	0	0	0
Persipa Pati	2022–23	Liga 2	3	0	0	0	–		0	0	3	0
PSIS Semarang	2022–23	Liga 1	1	0	0	0	–		0	0	1	0
Persipa Pati (loan)	2023–24	Liga 2	15	0	0	0	–		0	0	15	0
Nusantara United	2024–25	Liga 2	17	1	0	0	–		0	0	17	1
Persikad Depok	2025–26	Championship	15	2	0	0	–		0	0	15	2
Persikad Depok	2026–27	Championship	2	0	0	0	–		0	0	2	0
Career total			53	3	0	0	0	0	0	0	53	3
