= 2022 Liga 3 final =

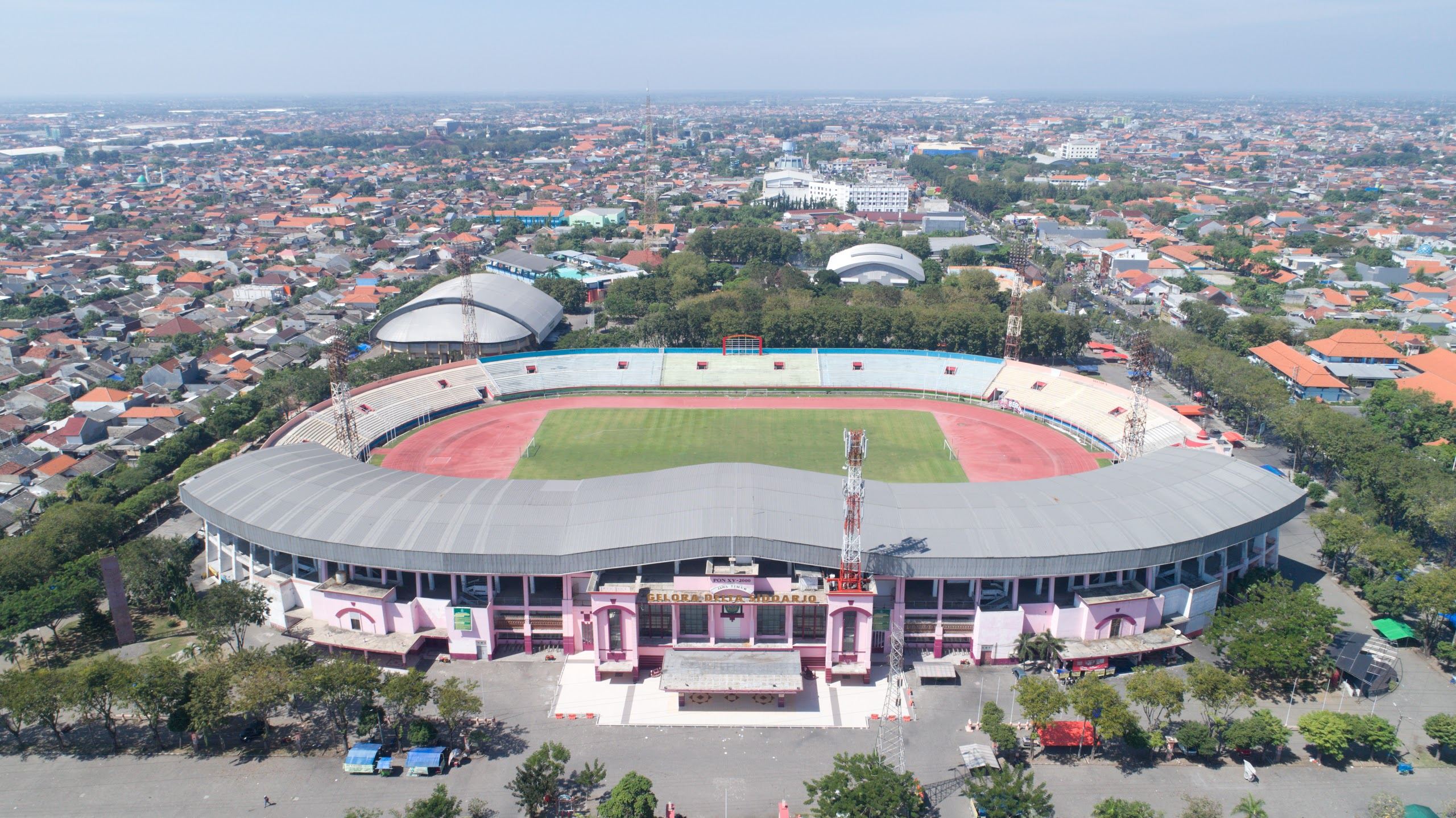
- The Gelora Delta Stadium in Sidoarjo hosted the final.
- Event: 2021–22 Liga 3
Karo United	Putra Delta Sidoarjo
(North Sumatra)	(East Java)
3	3
- Karo United won 4–2 on penalties
- Date: 30 March 2022
- Venue: Gelora Delta Stadium, Sidoarjo

The 2022 Liga 3 final was the final that decided the winner of the 2021–22 Liga 3, the sixth season of third-tier competition in Indonesia organised by PSSI, and the fifth season since it was renamed from the Liga Nusantara to the Liga 3 between Karo United and Putra Delta Sidoarjo. It was played on 30 March 2022 at Gelora Delta Stadium, Sidoarjo.

Karo United won 5–3 on a penalty shoot-out after a 3–3 draw at the end of full time, securing their first title in the competition.

== Match ==
30 March 2022
14:00

Karo United	3–3	Putra Delta Sidoarjo
Tarigan 15' (pen.); Faisal 20'; Agung 40'	Report	Adam 9'; Yoga 45'; Fajrul 88'
Penalties
Aidun (penalty scored); Faisal (penalty scored); Riyan (penalty scored); Aditiya (penalty scored)	4–2	(penalty scored) Adam; (penalty missed) Burji; (penalty scored) Fega; (penalty missed) Shadiq

Gelora Delta Stadium, Sidoarjo Regency

Karo United	Putra Delta Sidoarjo
