= 757 Kepri Jaya F.C. =

Indonesian football club

757 Kepri Jaya
- Full name: 757 Kepulauan Riau Jaya Football Club
- Nicknames: Serdadu Melayu; Ikan Kakap Emas
- Founded: 2017; 9 years ago
- Ground: Gelora Citramas Stadium, Batam, Riau Islands
- Capacity: 600
- Owner: PT Primakarya Dinamika Selaras
- Chairman: Nurdin Basirun
- Coach: Bona Elisa Simanjuntak
- League: Liga 4
- 2024–25: Liga Nusantara/Relegation Round (Group J), 4th (relegated)
Home colours	Away colours

757 Kepulauan Riau Jaya Football Club (simply known as 757 Kepri Jaya) is an Indonesian football club based in Batam, Riau Islands. They currently compete in Liga 4.

== History ==
The club were formed in 2017 following a merger of PS Bintang Jaya Asahan and YSK 757 Karimun and currently play in Liga 3. The club chose the Golden Snapper as their club logo due to their habitat surrounding Batam.

757 Kepri Jaya is a football club being controlled under the Governor of Riau Islands, Nurdin Basirun who won the 2016 ISC Liga Nusantara for the Riau Islands zone in their debut in the Indonesian League competition.

In 2018, 757 Kepri Jaya competed in Liga 3, the third tier league in Indonesia.

In the 2024–25 season, 757 Kepri Jaya got relegated after falling in the relegation zone thus competing in the 2025–26 Liga 4.

== Stadium ==
757 Kepri Jaya play their home matches at Gelora Citramas Stadium, Batam.

== Players ==
=== Current squad ===
As of 15 December 2024

Note: Flags indicate national team as defined under FIFA eligibility rules; some limited exceptions apply. Players may hold more than one non-FIFA nationality.

No.	Pos.	Nation	Player
1	GK	IDN	Gianluca Rossy
2	DF	IDN	Bagas Aji
3	DF	IDN	Rayhan Darmawan
4	DF	IDN	Pian Hadiansyah
5	DF	IDN	Ardhia Prima
6	DF	IDN	Bayu Firmansyah
7	MF	IDN	Munirul Anam
8	MF	IDN	Rheyvan Nabawi
10	MF	IDN	Muhammad Syahril
11	MF	IDN	Zola Mendetega
12	MF	IDN	Azriel Feren
13	MF	IDN	Muhammad Suryadi
14	MF	IDN	Akhmad Prasetyo
16	DF	IDN	Dion Galeh
19	FW	IDN	Rudianto

No.	Pos.	Nation	Player
20	GK	IDN	Raden Wijaya
21	MF	IDN	Fajar Ananta
22	MF	IDN	Wiji Atmoko
23	DF	IDN	Saviola Meindeita
25	DF	IDN	Restu Pratama
26	DF	IDN	Ahmad Fauzi
28	FW	IDN	Shahih Rishandy
32	FW	IDN	Farrel Arya
33	DF	IDN	Faozan Musanef (captain)
35	DF	IDN	Fauzan Zanilali
44	FW	IDN	Rangga Maulana
55	DF	IDN	Ridwan Abdullah
77	FW	IDN	Hasbullah Kader
81	GK	IDN	Julfikar Laing
99	MF	IDN	Sayfullah Kader

== Coaching staff ==
Position	Name
Head coach	(Indonesia) Nazal Mustofa
Assistant coach	(Indonesia) Restu Setyo Kartiko

== Season-by-season records ==
As Bintang Jaya Asahan

Season(s)	League/Division	Tier	Tms.	Pos.	Piala Indonesia	AFC/AFF competition(s)	
2010–11	Third Division	5		Fourth round	–	–	–
2012	Second Division	4	100	4	–	–	–
2013	First Division	3	77	3rd, Third round	–	–	–
2014	Premier Division	2	63	4th, Group 1	–	–	–
2015	Premier Division	2	55	season abandoned	–	–	–
2016	Indonesia Soccer Championship B	2	53	7th, Group 1	–	–	–

As 757 Kepri Jaya

Season(s)	League/Division	Tier	Tms.	Pos.	Piala Indonesia	AFC/AFF competition(s)	
2017	Liga 2	2	61	5th, Group 1	–	–	–
2018	Liga 3	3	32	4th, First round	Round of 32	–	–
2019	Liga 3	3	32	Second round	Round of 32	–	–
2020	Liga 3	3	season abandoned		–	–	–
2021–22	Liga 3	3	64	4th, First round	–	–	–
2022–23	Liga 3	3	season abandoned		–	–	–
2023–24	Liga 3	3	80	4th, Third round	–	–	–
2024–25	Liga Nusantara	3	16	4th, Relegation round	–	–	–
2025–26	Liga 4	4	64	–	–	–	–

== Honours ==
- Liga 3 Riau Islands
  - Champions (3): 2019, 2021, 2023
- Liga 4 Riau Islands
  - Champions (1): 2025–26
