= Fikri Ardiansyah =

Indonesian footballer (born 1995)

Personal information
- Full name: Fikri Ardiansyah
- Date of birth: 25 December 1995 (age 30)
- Place of birth: Sigi, Indonesia
- Height: 1.65 m (5 ft 5 in)
- Positions: Attacking midfielder; winger

Team information
- Current team: Persikad Depok
- Number: 12

Youth career
- –2011: Galara Utama
- 2011–2015: Persigi Sigi
- 2016: Persipal Palu

Senior career*
| Years | Team | Apps | (Gls) |
| 2017–2018 | Celebest | 24 | (4) |
| 2018 | PS TIRA | | |
| 2018 | Persik Kendal | | |
| 2019–2020 | Muba Babel United | 8 | (5) |
| 2021–2023 | Persis Solo | 5 | (0) |
| 2022 | → Nusantara United (loan) | 4 | (0) |
| 2023–2025 | Persipal Palu | 33 | (7) |
| 2025– | Persikad Depok | 25 | (4) |
- * Club domestic league appearances and goals as of 11 October 2026

Fikri Ardiansyah (born 25 December 1995) is an Indonesian professional footballer who plays as an attacking midfielder or winger for Championship club Persikad Depok.

== Club career ==
Fikri was born in the village of Sidondo in Sigi Regency, Central Sulawesi. He developed an interest in football at a very young age and started playing in his hometown. He began his senior professional career with Celebest, competing in the Liga 2 for several seasons until 2018.

In February 2018, Fikri joined PS TIRA for the 2018 Piala Presiden and the 2018 Liga 1 season. He was brought in along with three other players from Central Sulawesi. In the same season he moved to Persik Kendal to play in the 2018 Liga 3.

In 2019, he strengthened Babel United (later became Muba Babel United) to play in the 2019 Liga 2.

In 2021, Fikri joined Persis Solo. During the following years, Fikri served loans at Nusantara United.

In 2023, he returned to his home province to play for Persipal Palu in the second half of the 2023–24 season. Fikri made his debut for Persipal Palu on the 4 October 2023 during an away Liga 2 against Persewar Waropen. On 18 November 2023, he scored his first league goal for Persipal from the free-kick in a 1–2 home defeat against PSBS Biak.

In September 2025, Fikri moved to Persikad Depok. On 13 September 2025, he made his league debut for the club in a match against Sumsel United, playing as a starter in 0–1 home lose. 13 November 2025, Fikri scored his first league goal for Persikad in a 3–1 lose over Sumsel United at Palembang. Fikri finished the season with two goals in 20 league appearances. In August 2026, he officially extended his contract with the club to remain integrated into their campaign for the 2026–27 Championship season.

Fikri scored his first goal of the 2026–27 season on 12 September 2026, in a home game against PSGC Ciamis, the game ended in a 2–1 victory for Persikad. On 11 October 2026, Fikri scored equalizer in the 64th minute in Persikad's victory over Semen Padang with a score of 2–1 at Pakansari Stadium, Bogor Regency.
