= 2018 Liga 3 final =

2018 Liga 3 finals
- Event: 2018 Liga 3
| Persik | PSCS |
| (East Java) | (Central Java) |
| 3 | 2 |
- on aggregate

First leg
| Persik | PSCS |
| 3 | 1 |
- Date: 27 December 2018
- Venue: Brawijaya Stadium, Kediri
- Referee: Yudi Nurcahya

Second leg
| PSCS | Persik |
| 1 | 0 |
- Date: 30 December 2018
- Venue: Wijayakusuma Stadium, Cilacap
- Referee: Thoriq Alkatiri

The 2018 Liga 3 finals was the two-legged final that decided the winner of the 2018 Liga 3, the third season of third-tier competition in Indonesia organised by PSSI, and the second season since it was renamed from the Liga Nusantara to the Liga 3.

The finals was contested in two-legged home-and-away format between Persik and PSCS. The first leg was hosted by Persik at Brawijaya Stadium in Kediri on 27 December 2018, while the second leg was hosted by PSCS at Wijayakusuma Stadium in Cilacap on 30 December 2018.

Persik defeated PSCS 3–2 on aggregate to win their first Liga 3 title.

== Road to the final ==
Note: In all scores below, the score of the related team is given first.

| Persik | | Round | PSCS | |
|---|---|---|---|---|
| Group G winners: Pos / Team / Pld / Pts; 1 / Persik / 3 / 9; 2 / PSN / 3 / 6; 3 / Persitoli / 3 / 3; 4 / Persekam Metro / 3 / 0; Source: PSSI | | First round | Group B winners: Pos / Team / Pld / Pts; 1 / PSCS / 3 / 9; 2 / Solok / 3 / 4; 3 / PSBL / 3 / 3; 4 / PSID / 3 / 1; Source: PSSI | |
| Opponent | Score | Second round | Opponent | Score |
| Persinga | 2–1 | Second round | AS Abadi | 4–0 |
| East Group winners: Pos / Team / Pld / Pts; 1 / Persik (C, P) / 3 / 7; 2 / Persatu (P) / 3 / 4; 3 / Persewar (P) / 3 / 3; 4 / Celebest / 3 / 1; Source: PSSI (C) Champions; (P) Promoted | | Third round | West Group winners: Pos / Team / Pld / Pts; 1 / PSCS (P) / 3 / 7; 2 / PSGC (P) / 3 / 6; 3 / Bogor (P) / 3 / 3; 4 / Persiba Bantul / 3 / 1; Source: PSSI (P) Promoted | |

== Format ==
The finals was played on a home-and-away two-legged basis. If tied on aggregate, the away goals rule would be used. If still tied on away goals rule, 30 minutes of extra time would be played. If still tied after extra time, the penalty shoot-out would be used to determine the winner.

== Matches ==
=== First leg ===
27 December 2018

| Persik | 3–1 | PSCS |
|---|---|---|
| Septian 7', 45+1'; Alfian 23' | Report | Jimmy 18' |

Brawijaya Stadium, Kediri
Referee: Yudi Nurcahya

=== Second leg ===
30 December 2018

| PSCS | 1–0 | Persik |
|---|---|---|
| Arbeta 87' | Report |

Wijayakusuma Stadium, Cilacap
Referee: Thoriq Alkatiri
