= Tuharea =

Tuharea is a surname. Notable people with the surname include:

- Haris Tuharea (born 1994), Indonesian footballer
- Ichwan Tuharea (born 2000), Indonesian footballer
- Salim Tuharea (born 2003), Indonesian footballer
