= Subagja =

Subagja is an Indonesian name. Notable people with this name include:

- Ahmad Subagja Baasith (born 1996), Indonesian football player
- Ricky Subagja (born 1971), Indonesian badminton player
