= Yudha =

Yudha is a given name. Notable people with the name include:

- Yudha Alkanza (born 1998), Indonesian footballer
- Yudha Febrian (born 2002), Indonesian footballer
- Yudha Saputera (born 1998), Indonesian basketball player

== See also ==
- Satya Widya Yudha, Indonesian politician
