= Raufa Aghastya =

Indonesian footballer (born 2005)

Personal information
- Full name: Muhammad Raufa Aghastya
- Date of birth: 25 November 2005 (age 20)
- Place of birth: Bandung, Indonesia
- Height: 1.72 m (5 ft 8 in)
- Position: Goalkeeper

Team information
- Current team: PSGC Ciamis
- Number: 1

Youth career
- 2018–2023: Saint Prima
- 2023–2024: Persib Bandung U18
- 2024–2025: Persib Bandung U20
- 2025–2026: Persijap Jepara U20

Senior career*
Years	Team	Apps	(Gls)
2025–2026	Persijap Jepara	7	(0)
2026–	PSGC Ciamis	2	(0)
- * Club domestic league appearances and goals as of 19 September 2026

Muhammad Raufa Aghastya (born 25 November 2005) is an Indonesian professional footballer who plays as a goalkeeper for Championship club PSGC Ciamis.

== Club career ==
=== Early career and Persib Bandung ===
Aghastya began his youth development pathway with local club Saint Prima in his hometown of Bandung from 2018 until 2023. He subsequently entered the professional academy ranks of top-flight side Persib Bandung. He represented Persib Bandung across the multi-tiered Elite Pro Academy (EPA) structural setups, registering 23 selections for the under-20 roster during the 2024–25 seasonal iteration.

=== Persijap Jepara ===
In mid-2025, Aghastya transitioned to Persijap Jepara ahead of their domestic league program. He functioned primarily within the first-team environment for the 2025–26 Super League campaign. He was registered as the second-choice goalkeeper on the competitive senior substitute bench for several top-tier fixtures, including matches against Persib Bandung, Borneo Samarinda, and Persita Tangerang. Across his full developmental phase with Persijap Jepara senior squad, he registered seven official first-team appearances.

=== PSGC Ciamis ===
On 21 August 2026, Aghastya completed a permanent transfer to Championship side PSGC Ciamis to reinforce their defensive roster. He secured the jersey number 1 and formally recorded his competitive debut for the senior club structure during a match within the introductory phases of the 2026–27 season. On 12 September 2026, Aghastya made his league debut for PSGC Ciamis, starting in a 1–2 lost against Persikad Depok at the Pakansari Stadium. A week later, Aghastya kept his first clean sheet of the 2026–27 season in a 2–0 home win over Sumsel United on the 2nd league game of the season, and saved a penalty just before the end of the first half.
