= Akbar Firmansyah =

Indonesian footballer (born 2002)

Personal information
- Full name: Akbar Firmansyah
- Date of birth: 1 June 2002 (age 24)
- Place of birth: Surabaya, Indonesia
- Height: 1.70 m (5 ft 7 in)
- Position: Left winger

Team information
- Current team: Kendal Tornado
- Number: 57

Youth career
- 2018–2020: Persebaya Surabaya

Senior career*
Years	Team	Apps	(Gls)
2021–2023	Persebaya Surabaya	11	(0)
2022	→ Gresik United (loan)	2	(0)
2023–2025	Gresik United	26	(2)
2025–	Kendal Tornado	26	(3)
- * Club domestic league appearances and goals as of 12 September 2026

Akbar Firmansyah (born 1 June 2002) is an Indonesian professional footballer who plays as a left winger for Championship club Kendal Tornado.

== Club career ==
=== Persebaya Surabaya ===
He was signed for Persebaya Surabaya to play in Liga 1 in the 2021 season. Akbar made his league debut on 4 September 2021 in a match against Borneo at the Wibawa Mukti Stadium, Cikarang.

== Career statistics ==
=== Club ===
As of 3 May 2026.

Club	Season	League			Cup		Other		Total	
Club	Season	Division	Apps	Goals	Apps	Goals	Apps	Goals	Apps	Goals
Persebaya Surabaya	2021	Liga 1	11	0	0	0	5 (Note: Appearances in Menpora Cup)	0	16	0
Persebaya Surabaya	2022–23	Liga 1	0	0	0	0	0	0	0	0
Gresik United (loan)	2022–23	Liga 2	2	0	0	0	0	0	2	0
Gresik United	2023–24	Liga 2	13	0	0	0	0	0	13	0
Gresik United	2024–25	Liga 2	13	2	0	0	0	0	13	2
Kendal Tornado	2025–26	Championship	25	3	0	0	0	0	25	3
Career total			64	5	0	0	5	0	69	5

== Honours ==
=== Club ===
Persebaya Surabaya U-20

- Elite Pro Academy U-20: 2019
