= Imus Wiranda =

Indonesian footballer (born 2002)

Personal information
- Date of birth: 14 August 2002 (age 24)
- Place of birth: Medan, Indonesia
- Height: 1.65 m (5 ft 5 in)
- Positions: Right-back; midfielder

Team information
- Current team: Persikad Depok
- Number: 14

Senior career*
Years	Team	Apps	(Gls)
2022–2024	PSDS Deli Serdang	20	(1)
2024–2025	Dejan	5	(0)
2025–	Persikad Depok	26	(1)
- * Club domestic league appearances and goals as of 3 October 2026

Imus Wiranda (born 14 August 2002) is an Indonesian professional footballer who plays as a right-back or midfielder for Championship club Persikad Depok.

== Club career ==
=== Early career ===
Born in Medan, Wiranda began his professional career with local club PSDS Deli Serdang. He registered 20 league appearances and scored one goal over two seasons with the club in the Liga 2. He subsequently moved to Dejan for the 2024–25 season, making five league appearances.

=== Persikad Depok ===
In August 2025, Wiranda signed a contract with Persikad Depok. He made his club debut on 13 September 2025, playing as a starter in a 0–1 loss to Sumsel United at the Pakansari Stadium. He made 23 league appearances during the 2025–26 season. On 18 September 2026, Wiranda scored his first goal for Persikad—a decisive long-range shot from outside the penalty box—in a 2–1 away victory against Adhyaksa Bekasi during the 2026–27 Championship campaign.

== Career statistics ==
=== Club ===
As of 3 October 2026

Club	Season	League			Cup		Other		Total	
Club	Season	Division	Apps	Goals	Apps	Goals	Apps	Goals	Apps	Goals
PSDS Deli Serdang	2022–23	Liga 2	5	0	—		—		5	0
PSDS Deli Serdang	2023–24	Liga 2	15	1	—		—		15	1
PSDS Deli Serdang	Total		20	1	—		—		20	1
Dejan	2024–25	Liga 2	5	0	—		—		5	0
Persikad Depok	2025–26	Championship	23	0	—		—		23	0
Persikad Depok	2026–27	Championship	3	1	—		—		3	1
Persikad Depok	Total		26	1	—		—		26	1
Career total			51	2	0	0	0	0	51	2
