= Faisal Ramadoni =

Indonesian footballer (born 1998)

Personal information
- Date of birth: 20 January 1998 (age 28)
- Place of birth: Serdang Bedagai, Indonesia
- Position: Forward

Team information
- Current team: Persikad Depok
- Number: 27

Youth career
- 2016–2017: Porwil Mandailing Natal
- 2017: Medan Utama
- 2017: Bogor
- 2020–2021: PON North Sumatra

Senior career*
Years	Team	Apps	(Gls)
2019	Bandung United	5	(0)
2019–2025	Sumut United	37	(11)
2025–	Persikad Depok	29	(1)
- * Club domestic league appearances and goals as of 3 October 2026

Faisal Ramadoni (born 20 January 1998) is an Indonesian professional footballer who plays as a forward for Championship club Persikad Depok.

== Club career ==
=== Early career ===
Born in the village of Celawan, in the district of Pantai Cermin, Serdang Bedagai Regency, North Sumatra, Faisal spent his youth career representing several local teams, including Porwil Mandailing Natal, Medan Utama, and Bogor Football Club. In July 2019, Faisal joined Bandung United for the 2019 Liga 2 season. He later represented the North Sumatra regional team (PON North Sumatra) at the 2021 National Sports Week in Papua.

=== Sumut United ===
In late 2019, Faisal joined Liga 3 club Karo United (later renamed Sada Sumut and subsequently Sumut United). As he entered his second year with the club competing in Liga 3, he became an integral part of the squad and helped the team win the Liga 3 (Indonesian 3rd tier) title in 2021–22, while also securing the team's promotion to Liga 2 for the following season. Faisal made his new season debut for the club on the 28 August 2022 during a home Liga 2 against PSDS Deli Serdang. On 1 October 2022, he scored his first goal for Karo United in a 0–1 away won against PSPS Riau. Although he was a regular starter for Karo United, he made six appearances and scored one goal before his club ultimately decided not to continue competing, as the season was suspended due to a tragedy.

During his tenure with the North Sumatran club, he established himself as a prominent goalscorer.

=== Persikad Depok ===
Ahead of the 2025–26 Championship season, Faisal remained with the club following its relocation and rebranding from Sumut United to Persikad Depok, he was among several players retained as head coach Ridwan Saragih transitioned to lead the newly rebranded side. Subsequently, on 22 September 2025, Faisal made his league debut for Persikad in a home match against Sriwijaya, he came on as a substitute for Kamron Saydazimov in the 46th minute of a 3–3 draw. On 19 November 2025, he scored his first goal for Persikad in the 87th minute of a 0–3 away win against Sriwijaya. On 11 January 2026, as a starter of a 1–0 away defeat against Persiraja Banda Aceh, he was sent off with a double yellow card in the 90+5th minute. Faisal finished his first season at Persikad with 25 league appearances, scored one goal and three assists.

On 13 August 2026, his deal was extended to remain with the club for the 2026–27 Championship campaign.

== Honours ==
- Sumut United
  - Liga 3: 2021–22, 2024–25
