= Yudha Alkanza =

Indonesian footballer

Personal information
- Full name: Arif Satya Yudha Alkanza
- Date of birth: 16 May 1998 (age 28)
- Place of birth: Bantul, Indonesia
- Height: 1.80 m (5 ft 11 in)
- Position: Midfielder

Team information
- Current team: Kendal Tornado
- Number: 11

Senior career*
Years	Team	Apps	(Gls)
2018	Persiba Bantul	13	(7)
2019	Persitema Temanggung	0	(0)
2019	PSS Sleman	3	(0)
2020–2025	PSIM Yogyakarta	40	(4)
2025–	Kendal Tornado	21	(1)
- * Club domestic league appearances and goals as of 12 September 2026

Arif Satya Yudha Alkanza (born 16 May 1998) is an Indonesian professional footballer who plays as a central or attacking midfielder for Liga 2 club Kendal Tornado.

== Club career ==
=== PSS Sleman ===
He was signed for PSS Sleman to play in Liga 1. Alkanza made his league debut on 2 November 2019 in a match against PSIS Semarang at the Maguwoharjo Stadium, Sleman.

=== PSIM Yogyakarta ===
He was signed for PSIM Yogyakarta to play in Liga 2 in the 2020 season. This season was suspended on 27 March 2020 due to the COVID-19 pandemic. The season was abandoned and was declared void on 20 January 2021.

== Career statistics ==
=== Club ===
As of match played 12 September 2026

Club	Season	League			Cup (Note: Includes Piala Indonesia)		Other		Total	
Club	Season	Division	Apps	Goals	Apps	Goals	Apps	Goals	Apps	Goals
Persiba Bantul	2018	Liga 3	13	7	0	0	0	0	13	7
Persitema Temanggung	2019	Liga 3	—		0	0	0	0	—	
PSS Sleman	2019	Liga 1	3	0	0	0	0	0	3	0
PSIM Yogyakarta	2020	Liga 2	1	0	0	0	0	0	1	0
PSIM Yogyakarta	2021	Liga 2	8	1	0	0	0	0	8	1
PSIM Yogyakarta	2022–23	Liga 2	5	1	0	0	0	0	5	1
PSIM Yogyakarta	2023–24	Liga 2	11	0	0	0	0	0	11	0
PSIM Yogyakarta	2024–25	Liga 2	16	2	0	0	0	0	16	2
Kendal Tornado	2025–26	Championship	20	1	0	0	0	0	20	1
Kendal Tornado	2026–27	Championship	1	0	0	0	0	0	1	0
Career total			77	12	0	0	0	0	77	12

== Honours ==
PSIM Yogyakarta

- Liga 2: 2024–25
