= Herwin Tri Saputra =

Indonesian footballer

Personal information
- Full name: Herwin Tri Saputra
- Date of birth: 10 January 1991 (age 35)
- Place of birth: Makassar, Indonesia
- Height: 1.78 m (5 ft 10 in)
- Position: Centre-back

Team information
- Current team: Persikad Depok
- Number: 22

Youth career
- 2009: PSM Makassar

Senior career*
Years	Team	Apps	(Gls)
2010–2012	Persipon Pontianak		
2012–2015	Persip Pekalongan	5	(0)
2016	Bhayangkara	1	(0)
2017	Gresik United	10	(0)
2017	Mitra Kukar	11	(0)
2018–2021	Persikabo 1973	7	(0)
2021–2022	Persita Tangerang	10	(1)
2022–2023	RANS Nusantara	6	(0)
2023–2024	Sriwijaya	12	(1)
2024–2025	PSBS Biak	5	(0)
2025–2026	Semen Padang	2	(0)
2026	→ Persela Lamongan (loan)	10	(1)
2026–	Persikad Depok	1	(0)
- * Club domestic league appearances and goals as of 12 September 2026

Herwin Tri Saputra (born 10 January 1991) is an Indonesian professional footballer who plays as a centre-back for Championship club Persikad Depok.

== Club career ==
=== PS TIRA ===
He was signed for PS TIRA to play in Liga 1 in the 2018 season. Herwin made his league debut on 30 April 2018 in a match against Bali United at the Sultan Agung Stadium, Bantul.

=== Persita Tangerang ===
In 2021, Herwin signed a contract with Liga 1 club Persita Tangerang. He made his debut on 22 October 2021 in a match against Persikabo 1973. On 6 November 2021, he scored his first goal for Persita against Madura United in a 2–1 win at the Moch. Soebroto Stadium, Magelang.

=== RANS Nusantara ===
Herwin was signed for RANS Nusantara to play in Liga 1 in the 2022–23 season. He made his league debut on 6 December 2022 in a match against Persis Solo at the Maguwoharjo Stadium, Sleman.

=== Persiraja Banda Aceh ===
In July 2025, he joined Persiraja Banda Aceh for the 2025–26 season. He made two appearances for the club during the first half of the campaign before being released during the mid-season transfer window in January 2026.

=== Persela Lamongan ===
On 14 January 2026, it was announced that he had signed for Persela Lamongan to bolster their defense for the remainder of the season. He made his debut for the club on 18 January 2026, appearing as a substitute in a match against PSS Sleman.
