= Ramdani Tawainella =

Indonesian footballer (born 2000)

Personal information
- Full name: Ramdani Tawainella
- Date of birth: 1 January 2000 (age 26)
- Place of birth: Tulehu, Indonesia
- Height: 1.70 m (5 ft 7 in)
- Positions: Midfielder; winger

Team information
- Current team: Persikad Depok
- Number: 17

Youth career
- –2014: Tulehu Putra
- 2014–2015: ASIOP
- 2016: PPLP Bogor Regency

Senior career*
Years	Team	Apps	(Gls)
2020–2021	Persis Solo	0	(0)
2021–2022	RANS Cilegon	5	(0)
2022–2023	PSCS Cilacap	4	(0)
2023–2024	PSBS Biak	6	(0)
2024	Persikabo 1973	10	(0)
2024–2025	Bekasi City	6	(0)
2025	PSMTW Muara Teweh	0	(0)
2026–	Persikad Depok	0	(0)

International career^{‡}
2014	Indonesia U14		
- * Club domestic league appearances and goals as of 30 January 2025 ‡ National team caps and goals as of 9 April 2014

Ramdani Tawainella (born 1 January 2000) is an Indonesian professional footballer who plays as a midfielder or winger for Championship club Persikad Depok.

== Club career ==
=== Early career ===
Born in Tulehu, Tawainella spent his youth career developing with Tulehu Putra (until 2014), ASIOP (2014–2015), and later joined the PPLP Bogor Regency regional sports school academy program in 2016.

Tawainella entered professional career by signing with Persis Solo in early 2020 before later moving to RANS Nusantara in 2021. Tawainella made his debut for the club on the 28 September 2021 during a away Liga 2 against Dewa United. During his first season with RANS Cilegon, he made a total of 5 appearances and without scoring.

=== PSCS Cilacap ===
In August 2022, Tawainella moved to PSCS Cilacap. He made his competitive debut during the 2022–23 Liga 2 campaign, accumulating four appearances before the competition was prematurely halted.

=== PSBS Biak ===
Tawainella signed for PSBS Biak ahead of the 2023–24 Liga 2 campaign. He made 16 appearances for the club, helping them secure promotion to the top tier.

=== Persikabo 1973 ===
In September 2024, Tawainella joined Persikabo 1973 for the first round of the 2024–25 season. He made his Persikabo debut on 7 September 2024 in a away match against PSPS Pekanbaru at the Kaharudin Nasution Rumbai Stadium, Pekanbaru. His first victory as a substituted in a league game came in the 5–2 win over Dejan on 22 September 2024. He finished the first round of the 2024–25 season with 10 appearances and providing two assists.

=== Bekasi City ===
He joined Bekasi City during the second round of the 2024–25 Liga 2 season. He made his league debut on 20 December 2024, as starting line-up, which ended 0–1 away victory against PSKC Cimahi. During his brief stint with Bekasi City, he made 6 league appearances and recorded 1 assist.

=== PSMTW Muara Teweh ===
In October 2025, Tawainella joined the Central Kalimantan-based club PSMTW Muara Teweh. He made one appearance in the 2025 Central Kalimantan Governor's Cup tournament. He did not make any league appearances for the club, as the club was absent from the 2025–26 Liga 4 Central Kalimantan provincial phase.

=== Persikad Depok ===
In August 2026, ahead of the 2026–27 Championship campaign, Tawainella signed a contract with Persikad Depok.

== International career ==
Tawainella was part of the Indonesia U14 squad coached by Fakhri Husaini in the Jenesys 2.0 Japan–ASEAN U14 Football Exchange Programme, an invitational event, held from 1–9 April 2014, in Osaka, Japan.
