= Nico Sitepu =

Indonesian footballer (born 2004)

Personal information
- Full name: Nico Fernando Sitepu
- Date of birth: 9 December 2004 (age 21)
- Place of birth: Binjai, Indonesia
- Position: Central midfielder

Team information
- Current team: Persikad Depok
- Number: 21

Youth career
- 2022: PSKB Binjai U17
- 2022: Porprov North Sumatra
- 2023: Labura Hebat
- 2024: PON North Sumatra

Senior career*
Years	Team	Apps	(Gls)
2024–2025	Sumut United	16	(5)
2025–	Persikad Depok	16	(2)
- * Club domestic league appearances and goals as of 20 September 2026

Nico Fernando Sitepu (born 9 December 2004) is an Indonesian professional footballer who plays as a central midfielder for Championship club Persikad Depok.

== Club career ==
=== Early career ===
Sitepu began his football journey in his home province of North Sumatra, playing for the youth team of PSKB Binjai U17 and representing the region in the Porprov North Sumatra tournament in 2022. He briefly spent time with Labura Hebat in 2023 before representing the North Sumatra football team at the National Sports Week (PON) in 2024.

=== Sumut United and Persikad Depok ===
Sitepu joined Sumut United and was part of the squad that won the 2024–25 Liga Nusantara (the third tier of Indonesian football). Following the conclusion of the season, Sumut United was acquired by the West Java-based club Persikad Depok. As a result of the takeover, Sitepu, along with the entire coaching staff and seven other players, transferred to Persikad Depok for the upcoming campaign.

In September 2026, during the 2026–27 Championship season, Sitepu scored a dramatic solo-run match-winning goal in the 92nd minute against Adhyaksa Bekasi, securing a 2–1 victory for Persikad Depok. His outstanding tactical transition, defensive contributions, and the crucial goal earned him the "Player of the Week" honors for the league opening fixtures.

== Career statistics ==
=== Club ===
As of 18 September 2026.

Club	Season	League			Cup		Continental		Other		Total	
Club	Season	Division	Apps	Goals	Apps	Goals	Apps	Goals	Apps	Goals	Apps	Goals
Sumut United	2024–25	Liga 3	16	5	0	0	–		0	0	16	5
Persikad Depok	2025–26	Championship	14	1	0	0	–		0	0	14	1
Persikad Depok	2026–27	Championship	2	1	0	0	–		0	0	2	1
Career total			32	7	0	0	0	0	0	0	32	7

== Honours ==
Sumut United

- Liga Nusantara: 2024–25
