= Persikad Depok (2025) =

Indonesian football club

Persikad
- Full name: Persatuan Sepakbola Indonesia Kota Administratif Depok
- Nicknames: Serigala Margonda (Margonda Wolves)
- Short name: KAD
- Founded: 27 April 2018; 8 years ago as Persikad 1999; 4 June 2025; 17 months ago as Persikad Depok
- Ground: Merpati Stadium
- Capacity: 10,000
- Chairman: Egat Sacawijaya
- Manager: Diego Tobing
- Coach: Achmad Zulkifli
- League: Championship
- 2026–27: TBD
Home colours	Away colours

Persatuan Sepakbola Indonesia Kota Administratif Depok, commonly known as Persikad, is an Indonesian football club based in Depok, West Java. They currently compete in the Championship after bought Sumut United's licence.

== History ==
This club was formed on 27 April 2018 as Persikad 1999 after the original club, Persikad Depok, was sold and moved its home base to Bogor and became Bogor Football Club (later became Sulut United). Persikad 1999 acquired another West Java club, Mars Gelatik from Purwakarta to compete in Liga 3 West Java and was officially appointed through the PSSI West Java Congress in February 2020.

After struggling for several seasons in the West Java regional league zone of Liga 3 and Liga 4, Persikad has again acquired a club. This time they acquired the club that won the 2024–25 Liga Nusantara, Sumut United, and changed its name from Persikad 1999 to Persikad Depok, similar to the name of the club that was previously sold to Bogor.

As part of the acquisition, Persikad signed Sumut United's entire coaching staff, which included head coach Ridwan Saragih, as well as bringing in 8 players from the Liga Nusantara champions — Muhammad Irfan, Reza Lubis, Bagas Prasetyo, Alif Rizky, Ghozali Aufathul, Nico Sitepu, Hamzah Deva, and Faisal Ramadoni.

== Players ==
=== Current squad ===
As of September 2026

Note: Flags indicate national team as defined under FIFA eligibility rules; some limited exceptions apply. Players may hold more than one non-FIFA nationality.

No.	Pos.	Nation	Player
2	DF	CIV	Habib Fofana
5	MF	IDN	Rizky Ananda
6	DF	IDN	Ade Suryana
9	FW	BRA	Gustavo França
10	FW	COL	Jhon Mena
11	FW	IDN	Reyfaldo Hermawan
12	MF	IDN	Fikri Ardiansyah
14	DF	IDN	Imus Wiranda
15	MF	IDN	Fikri Firdaus
16	DF	IDN	Ibnu Yazid
17	FW	IDN	Ramdani Tawainella
18	FW	IDN	Satria Dwi Utomo
19	MF	IDN	Fachry Ghulam
20	MF	IDN	Salim Maidullah
21	MF	IDN	Nico Sitepu

No.	Pos.	Nation	Player
22	DF	IDN	Herwin Tri Saputra (captain)
23	GK	IDN	Yehezkiel Petra
26	DF	IDN	Roman Badawi
27	FW	IDN	Faisal Ramadoni
28	FW	IDN	Arfin Syahputra
30	DF	IDN	Rendy Saputra
31	GK	IDN	Zaenuri Azhar
32	DF	IDN	Yudi Safrizal
33	MF	IDN	Pahri Al Mudzaki
39	MF	IDN	Assyifa Marhaen
48	GK	IDN	Dafa Al Gasemi (on loan from Dewa United Banten)
77	MF	IDN	Yusril Tawainella
80	MF	IDN	Gilang Alviqi
95	MF	IDN	Sedek Tuakia

== Coaching staff ==
Position	Staff
Head coach	(Indonesia) Achmad Zulkifli
Assistant coach	(Indonesia) Sunandar Boro
Goalkeeper coach	(Indonesia) Farid Ridwan
Physical coach	(Indonesia) Lingga Saputra
Analyst	(Indonesia)
Doctor	(Indonesia) Ririn Budiarti
Physiotherapists	(Indonesia)

== Honours ==
- Liga 4 West Java Series 2
  - Runners-up (1): 2024–25

== Season-by-season records ==
Season	League	Tier	Tms.	Pos.	Piala Indonesia	I-League Cup
As Persikad Depok
2002	Second Division	3	24	2nd	–	–
2003	First Division	2	26	4th, Group A	–	–
2004	First Division	2	24	10th, West division	–	–
2005	First Division	2	27	4th, Group 1	–	–
2006	First Division	2	36	4th, Group 2	–	–
2007	First Division	2	40	2nd	–	–
2008–09	Premier Division	2	29	10th, Group 1	–	–
2009–10	Premier Division	2	33	disqualified	–	–
2010	First Division	3	57	5th, Group 5	–	–
2012	First Division (BLAI)	3	56	5th, Third round	–	–
2013	Premier Division	2	39	9th, Group 2	–	–
2014	Premier Division	2	63	6th, Group 2	–	–
2015	Premier Division	2	55	did not finish	–	–
2016	Indonesia Soccer Championship B	2	53	4th, Group 2	–	–
2017	Liga 2	2	61	5th, Group 2	–	–
As Persikad 1999
2019	Liga 3 West Java S2	4	27	Round of 12	–	–
2020	Liga 3 West Java S2	4	season abandoned		–	–
2021–22	Liga 3 West Java S2	4	42	3rd, Group E	–	–
2022–23	Liga 3 West Java S2	4	32	Quarter-finals	–	–
2023–24	Liga 3 West Java S2	4	42	3rd, Group G	–	–
2024–25	Liga 4 West Java S2	5	28	2nd	–	–
Rebranding to Persikad Depok after takeover of Sumut United
2025–26	Championship	2	20	8th, Group 1	–	–
2026–27	Championship	2	20	TBD	–	TBD

== Supporters and rivalries ==
Persikad has a core fan base known as Depok Mania. Other supporter groups include Persikad Fans Curva Sud and Ultras Persikad, both of which are primarily based in Depok. Apart from that, Depok is also known as the base of The Jakmania, supporters of Persija Jakarta, which is already big and established.

Due to their historical ties and proximity to Bogor Regency, which is the base of Persikabo Bogor, the two teams have met several times in matches called the Ciliwung derby. The match is often marked by high tension between the supporters of the two teams who are involved in clashes in the stadium and on the street when they meet. Another rivalry is with Persija Jakarta in the Persija Jakarta–Persikad Depok rivalry.
