= 2019 Liga 3 final =

- Event: 2019 Liga 3
PSKC	Persijap
(West Java)	(Central Java)
1	3
- Date: 29 December 2019
- Venue: Pakansari Stadium, Cibinong
- Referee: Juandi Hidayatulloh

The 2019 Liga 3 final was the final that decided the winner of the 2019 Liga 3, the fourth season of third-tier competition in Indonesia organised by PSSI, and the third season since it was renamed from the Liga Nusantara to the Liga 3 between PSKC and Persijap. The match was played on 29 December 2019 at Pakansari Stadium, Cibinong.

Persijap won the match 3–1 to secure their first title in this competition.

== Road to the final ==
Note: In all scores below, the score of the related team is given first.

PSKC		Round	Persijap	
Group C runners-up: Pos / Team / Pld / Pts; 1 / Persekat / 3 / 6; 2 / PSKC (H) / 3 / 6; 3 / Persibas / 3 / 6; 4 / Persitas / 3 / 0; Source: PSSI (H) Hosts		First round	Group E winners: Pos / Team / Pld / Pts; 1 / Persijap (H) / 3 / 6; 2 / Perseden / 3 / 6; 3 / Persidago / 3 / 4; 4 / PS Matra / 3 / 1; Source: PSSI (H) Hosts	
Opponent	Score	Second round	Opponent	Score
Persinga	2–1	Second round	PSIL	4–1
West Group winners: Pos / Team / Pld / Pts; 1 / PSKC (H, P) / 3 / 7; 2 / Tiga Naga (P) / 3 / 6; 3 / Persekat (P) / 3 / 3; 4 / Persidi / 3 / 1; Source: PSSI (H) Hosts; (P) Promoted		Third round	East Group winners: Pos / Team / Pld / Pts; 1 / Persijap (C, P) / 3 / 9; 2 / Putra Sinar Giri (H, P) / 3 / 4; 3 / Semeru (P) / 3 / 2; 4 / Perseta / 3 / 1; Source: PSSI (C) Champions; (H) Hosts; (P) Promoted	

== Match ==
29 December 2019
15:00 UTC+7

PSKC	1–3	Persijap
Dian 76'	Report	Faldi 60'; Rizki 70' (pen.); Zaenal 73'

Pakansari Stadium, Cibinong
Referee: Juandi Hidayatulloh
