= Try Hamdani =

Indonesian footballer

Personal information
- Full name: Try Hamdani Goentara
- Date of birth: 3 January 1994 (age 32)
- Place of birth: Palembang, Indonesia
- Height: 1.82 m (6 ft 0 in)
- Position: Goalkeeper

Team information
- Current team: Kendal Tornado
- Number: 34

Youth career
- 2011–2014: Sriwijaya

Senior career*
Years	Team	Apps	(Gls)
2015–2016	Sriwjaya	2	(0)
2017–2018	PSS Sleman	5	(0)
2018	Persipura Jayapura	0	(0)
2018–2019	PSS Sleman	8	(0)
2020–2022	Persita Tangerang	4	(0)
2022–2023	PSS Sleman	6	(0)
2023–2024	RANS Nusantara	8	(0)
2024	Gresik United	1	(0)
2025	Sriwjaya	2	(0)
2025–	Kendal Tornado	25	(0)
- * Club domestic league appearances and goals as of 12 September 2026

Try Hamdani Goentara (born 3 January 1994, in Palembang) is an Indonesian professional footballer who plays as a goalkeeper for Liga 2 club Kendal Tornado.

== Club career ==
In 2014, he joined to the main team of Sriwijaya. He is also the main Goalkeeper of Sriwijaya U21.

In 2017, he joined to PSS Sleman for Liga 2 He made his debut with PSS Sleman when against Persipura Jayapura in first match 2017 Piala Presiden

== Honours ==
=== Club ===
Sriwijaya U-21

- Indonesia Super League U-21: 2012–13

PSS Sleman

- Liga 2: 2018
