= Ahmad Baasith =

Indonesian footballer

Personal information
- Full name: Ahmad Subagja Baasith
- Date of birth: 15 June 1996 (age 30)
- Place of birth: Bandung, Indonesia
- Height: 1.78 m (5 ft 10 in)
- Position: Defensive midfielder

Team information
- Current team: PSGC Ciamis
- Number: 6

Youth career
- Persib Bandung
- 2016: PON Jabar

Senior career*
Years	Team	Apps	(Gls)
2017	Persib Bandung	4	(0)
2018–2020	Persela Lamongan	42	(0)
2020–2023	PSIM Yogyakarta	21	(0)
2022	→ PSIS Semarang (loan)	4	(0)
2023–2025	Malut United	21	(1)
2025–2026	Persiku Kudus	24	(0)
2026–	PSGC Ciamis	0	(0)
- * Club domestic league appearances and goals as of 20 April 2026

Ahmad Subagja Baasith (born 15 June 1996) is an Indonesian professional footballer who plays as a defensive midfielderfor Championship club PSGC Ciamis.

== Club career ==
=== Persib Bandung ===
Baasith made his professional debut in the Liga 1 on April 22, 2017, against PS TNI.

=== Persela Lamongan ===
In January 2018, Baasith signed a contract with Indonesian Liga 1 club Persela Lamongan. He made his league debut on 24 March 2018 in a match against Persipura Jayapura at the Mandala Stadium, Jayapura.

=== PSIM Yogyakarta ===
In 2020, Baasith signed a one-year contract with Indonesian Liga 2 club PSIM Yogyakarta. This season was suspended on 27 March 2020 due to the COVID-19 pandemic. The season was abandoned and was declared void on 20 January 2021.

== Honours ==
Malut United

- Liga 2 third place (play-offs): 2023–24
