= Golden snapper =

Golden snapper is a common name for a number of fish:

- Genus Centroberyx
  - Centroberyx affinis
- Genus Pagrus
  - Pagrus auratus
- Genus Lutjanus
  - Lutjanus inermis
  - Lutjanus johnii
  - Lutjanus mizenkoi
- Genus Pristipomoides
  - Pristipomoides multidens
