= Samudra Stadium =

Stadium in Indonesia

Gelora Samudra Stadium
- Stadion Gelora Samudra
- Location in Badung, Bali and Indonesia Gelora Samudra Stadium (Bali) Gelora Samudra Stadium (Indonesia)
- Address: Indonesia
- Location: Badung, Bali
- Coordinates: 8.79479°S 115.14504°E
- Operator: Government of Badung
- Capacity: 5,000
- Surface: Grass field

Tenant
- PS Badung

Gelora Samudra Stadium is a multi-purpose stadium in Badung, Indonesia. It is currently used mostly for football matches. It is the home of the PS Badung football club.
