= Gelora Citramas Stadium =

Stadium in Riau Islands, Indonesia

- Interactive map of Gelora Citramas Stadium
- Address: Jl. Hang Kesturi No.4, Batu Besar, Nongsa, Batam City, Riau Islands 29467
- Location: Batam, Riau Islands, Indonesia
- Coordinates: 1.107902°N 104.129714°E
- Owner: Citramas Foundation board
- Operator: Citramas Foundation board
- Capacity: 600
- Surface: Grass field

Tenants
- PS Citramas; 757 Kepri Jaya; PS Batam

Gelora Citramas Stadium is a stadium in Batam, Riau Islands, Indonesia. The stadium is home to 757 Kepri Jaya. It has a seating capacity of 600 people.

== See also ==
- List of stadiums in Indonesia
- List of stadiums by capacity
