= Sumut United F.C. =

Indonesian football club

Sumut United
- Full name: Sumatra Utara United Football Club
- Nicknames: Laskar Simbisa (Simbisa Warriors); Kambing Andalas (The Andalas Serow)
- Short name: SUU
- Founded: 29 July 2019; 7 years ago as Karo United; 29 May 2023; 3 years ago as Sada Sumut; 2024; 2 years ago as Sumut United
- Dissolved: 4 June 2025; 16 months ago
- Ground: Samura Stadium; Kabanjahe, North Sumatra
- Capacity: 1,000
- President: Theopilus Ginting
- Manager: Yosephine Sembiring
- Coach: Ridwan Saragih
- League: Liga 2
- 2024–25: Liga Nusantara, 2nd of 8 in Group A (Regular round); 1st of 3 in Group Y (Championship round, promoted); Final, champions
Home colours	Away colours

Sumatra Utara United Football Club, commonly known as Sumut United, was an Indonesian professional football club based in Karo Regency, North Sumatra. They were compete in the Liga 2 in 2024–25. In the 2021–22 Liga 3, Karo United came out as champions after defeating Putra Delta Sidoarjo. This was their first title in the club's history. In 2025, Persikad Depok bought Sumut United's slot and entered the Liga 2.

== History ==
Karo United was declared on 28 July 2019 in Medan City by a board led by the initiator and the club president Arya Mahendra Sinulingga. This club was founded with the aim of being a new force for football in North Sumatra.

In their debut season in the Indonesian football league, Karo United managed to win the 2019 Liga 3 North Sumatra zone after defeating PS Bhinneka with a score of 5–2 and advancing to the Regional Round. In the regional round, Karo United managed to beat PSLS Lhokseumawe with an aggregate score of 3–2. With this result, they advanced to the 2019 Liga 3 National Round. However, Karo United had to stop in the round of 16 after losing on penalties to Persidi Idi Rayeuk. That way, their dream of promotion to Liga 2 had to run aground.

On 17 June 2021, Arya Mahendra Sinulingga has resigned from his position as president club and his position was given to Theopilus Ginting who previously served as manager club. The position of manager left by Theopilus Ginting was later held by Yosephine Sembiring.

After 3 years they established and played in the Liga 3 North Sumatra zone and the national round, in the 2021–22 season, they qualified for the semifinals of the league and automatically qualified for promotion to Liga 2 next season. And in the final match, they managed to become champions in Liga 3 this season after beat Putra Delta Sidoarjo on penalties which ended with a score of 4–2.

Karo United officially changed its name to Sada Sumut. The name change was declared at the PSSI Ordinary Congress which was held on 28 May 2023 in Jakarta. The reason for the name change is related to the history of the struggle of the Karo people for Indonesian independence. The word "Sada" means "one" in Batak Karo language, the name Sada Sumut itself means that this team represents all of North Sumatra.

On 23 February 2025, Sumut United were secure promotion to Liga 2 from next season after defeat NZR Sumbersari 1–5 in last matchweek Championship round Group Y and return to second tier after one year absence for the second time. Four days later at same month and year, Sumut United secure champions of Liga Nusantara after defeat Tornado FC 4–1 in Champhionship final at Indomilk Arena with goal brace Jalesh Gagarin, Wiraja Aulia and Rico Sitepu and second title in third tier.

The 2025 PSSI Ordinary Congress at the Ritz Carlton Hotel, South Jakarta, Wednesday (4/6/2025) resulted in several decisions. One of them was the change of names of several Liga 2 (Indonesia) clubs for the 2025/2026 season. One of the clubs that changed its name was Sumut United. Sumut United, which is a team with promotion status as the champion of the 2024/2025 Nusantara League, changed its name to Persikad Depok. Not only the name, the team that was founded in 2019 will also move its home base to Depok City. The owner of Sumut United, Arya Sinulingga, when confirmed, confirmed the name change. "It's true (the name has changed). Now I want to focus on managing the federation (PSSI)," said Arya Sinulingga, Wednesday (4/6/2025).

== Players ==
=== Current squad ===
As of 15 June 2026

Note: Flags indicate national team as defined under FIFA eligibility rules; some limited exceptions apply. Players may hold more than one non-FIFA nationality.

No.	Pos.	Nation	Player
3	DF	IDN	Handoko
4	DF	IDN	Rifki Wahyudi
5	DF	BRA	Raphael Rossi
7	MF	IDN	Hamzah Deva
8	MF	IDN	Jalesh Gagarin
10	FW	IDN	Ahmad Rifai
12	MF	IDN	Ismawan
14	DF	IDN	Nur Kholis
15	DF	IDN	Luthfi Anshorri
16	FW	IDN	Ghozali Aufathul
17	MF	IDN	Yuda Risky
18	DF	IDN	Aditya Saputra
19	MF	IDN	Alif Rizky
20	FW	IDN	Andi Sitepu

No.	Pos.	Nation	Player
21	MF	IDN	Nico Sitepu
23	DF	IDN	Habib Firnanda
25	GK	IDN	Rofi Harun
26	DF	IDN	Muhammad Kifly
28	FW	IDN	Raka Winata
29	GK	IDN	Ikram Butarbutar
32	DF	IDN	Bagas Prasetyo
33	DF	IDN	Mansiz Minarta
37	FW	IDN	Wiraja Aulia
44	FW	IDN	Faisal Ramadoni
77	MF	IDN	Ikhsan Saifullah
97	GK	IDN	Muhammad Irfan (Captain)
99	GK	IDN	Ilham Pratama

== Season-by-season records ==
Season	Div.	Tier	Final position	Piala Indonesia^{f}
2019	Liga 3	3	Second round	not held
2020	Liga 3	3	season abandoned	not held
2021–22	Liga 3	3		not held
2021–22	Liga 3	3	1	not held
2022–23	Liga 2	2	season abandoned	not held
2023–24	Liga 2	2	4th in Group A (Relegation round)	not held
2024–25	Liga Nusantara	3	1	not held

== Honours ==
- Liga 3/Liga Nusantara
  - Champions (2): 2021–22, 2024–25
- Liga 3 North Sumatra
  - Champion (1): 2019
  - Third-place (1): 2021–22

== Coaching staff ==
Position	Name
Head coach	(Indonesia) Ridwan Saragih
Assistant coach	(Indonesia) Susanto
Goalkeeper coach	(Indonesia) Dede Pranata

== Supporters ==
This football club with the nicknames "Simbisa Warriors" and "Andalas Goat" (Andalas serow) has a group of supporters (supporters) called Karomania. Apart from being based in Karo Regency, Karomania is also found in several areas in North Sumatra, such as Deli Serdang Regency, Langkat Regency, Binjai, and Medan. Furthermore, the presence of a Karo United FC supporter group has also been formed in Jakarta which is nicknamed Karomania Jakarta.

== Mascot ==
The name of the Sada Sumut mascot is "Beidar". Beidar is an Andalas goat (Andalas Serow) who wears the Sada Sumut jersey.

== Nicknames ==
- Laskar Simbisa is the nickname of Sada Sumut FC. Simbisa Warriors means knights, brave and honorable.
- Kambing Andalas originating from the forest Mount Sinabung is an icon of Sada Sumut. The Andalas goat (Andalas serow) known as the Andalas Goat, is a strong animal, capable of running fast, agile, and capable of jumping high above other animals.
