= NZR Sumbersari F.C. =

Indonesian football club

NZR Sumbersari
- Full name: NZR Sumbersari
- Nicknames: Elang Selatan (Southern Eagles)
- Short name: NZR
- Founded: 1985; 41 years ago as Sumbersari Putra; 2018; 8 years ago as Sumbersari FC
- Dissolved: 4 June 2025; 15 months ago
- Ground: Gajayana Stadium
- Capacity: 25,000
- Owner: NZR Group
- Chairman: Wibie Dwi Andriyas
- Manager: Yanuar Tri Firmanda
- Coach: Agus Yuwono
- 2024–25: Liga Nusantara/Championship Round (Group Y), 3rd
Home colours	Away colours

NZR Sumbersari Football Club was an Indonesian football club based in Malang, East Java that previously competes in Liga Nusantara and play their home match at Gajayana Stadium.

On 4 June 2025, NZR Sumbersari place in the league replaced by Persikutim East Kutai and the team officially disbanded.

== History ==
Starting from a group of village football lovers, currently starting their steps in the Liga 3 East Java zone. they have been around since 1985, Sumbersari FC was born and established as a football academy under the name Sumbersari Putra. The name was taken from the name of the village of Sumbersari which is currently the village of Bandulan. Early they entered Liga 3 because of the lack of internal competition in Malang, so that players get playing minutes, this team was included in Liga 3, so that young players in football academy could feel the competition, Then in 2018, they changed their name to Sumbersari FC which was prepared to play in Liga 3 2018 in the East Java zone.

In 2019, this is the second year that Sumbersari FC has played in the Liga 3. With young players, the target is not a benchmark, the team must play well and show hard work. The results will follow later. Sumbersari FC will face a team with a big name, Deltras Sidoarjo. The mental and ability of Saiful Imron's team will be really tested. They became the first "village team" that qualified to Liga 3 Regional Round after finished 3rd place in 2019 Liga 3 East Java Group J. They are successful to qualify for the regional round in the 2019 season. However, their steps were stopped after they were defeated by Serang Jaya from Banten at that time, Entering early 2021, they changed their name to NZR Sumbersari FC. This is because Sumbersari FC already has a new investor and manager, namely the owner of the NZR Group, Wibie Dwi Andriyas.

On 9 November 2021, NZR Sumbersari made league match debut in a 5–1 win against Triple's Kediri at the Gajayana Stadium. On 16 December 2021, 2021 Liga 3 East Java has been held and NZR Sumbersari has become the champion to represent the province at the national level, not only being a regional champion, NZR Sumbersari has been undefeated in the struggle in the league zone since the competition was held on November 3, 2021. In the final match, they win 1–0 against Persedikab Kediri.

On 30 May 2022, during 2022 PSSI Ordinary Congress, the club officially changed their name to NZR Sumbersari F.C., from Sumbersari F.C..

On 4 June 2025, NZR Sumbersari was acquired by Liga 4 side Persikutim. As a result, Persikutim took over NZR Sumbersari's place in Liga Nusantara starting from this season.

== Players ==
As of January 2025

Note: Flags indicate national team as defined under FIFA eligibility rules; some limited exceptions apply. Players may hold more than one non-FIFA nationality.

No.	Pos.	Nation	Player
2	DF	IDN	Suroso
4	DF	IDN	Tegar Shevanton
6	FW	IDN	Alarice Nesta
7	FW	IDN	Yhogix Yholanda
8	DF	IDN	Gedhong Tangguh (captain)
9	FW	IDN	Dian Sasongko
10	MF	IDN	Jonathan Prawira
11	DF	IDN	Rahmat Hidayat
12	FW	IDN	Aqsa Rabbani
13	DF	IDN	Ali Akbar Navis
14	MF	IDN	Wahyu Nur Cahya
15	FW	IDN	Sunarto
16	MF	IDN	Malik Akbar
17	FW	IDN	Fata Brilliantino
18	DF	IDN	Muhammad Indra

No.	Pos.	Nation	Player
19	DF	IDN	Faiq Rachmatulloh
20	GK	IDN	Juntak Wahyu
21	MF	IDN	Reno Eka
22	GK	IDN	Mochammad Ircham
25	DF	IDN	Yedica Dhimas
26	MF	IDN	Sandy Kusuma
31	MF	IDN	Ragil Yusuf
33	DF	IDN	Alwi Furqon
35	MF	IDN	Reza Saputra
59	GK	IDN	Putra Pratama
66	FW	IDN	Jeka Monteiro
73	FW	IDN	Rayhan Andanti
75	DF	IDN	Rio Fernando
77	MF	IDN	Elfin Vieira
87	DF	IDN	Almaghfiru Inzaghi

== Season-by-season records ==
Season	League/Division	Tms.	Pos.	Piala Indonesia	AFC competition(s)
2018	Liga 3	32	Eliminated in Provincial round	–	–
2019	Liga 3	32	Eliminated in Regional round	–	–
2020	Liga 3	season abandoned		–	–
2021–22	Liga 3	64	3rd, First round	–	–
2022–23	Liga 3	season abandoned		–	–
2023–24	Liga 3	80	4th, Third round	–	–
2024–25	Liga Nusantara	16	3rd, Championship round	–	–

== Honours ==
- Liga 3 East Java
  - Champions (1): 2021
  - Fourth-place (1): 2023–24
