= Persipasi Kota Bekasi =

Association football team in Indonesia

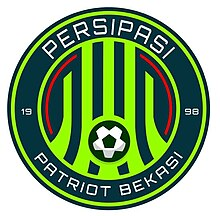
- Full name: Persatuan Sepakbola Indonesia Patriot Kota Bekasi
- Nickname: Laskar Patriot
- Founded: 5 April 2017; 9 years ago as Patriot Candrabhaga FC; 9 November 2021; 4 years ago as PCB Persipasi (merged with Persipasi Bekasi); 31 May 2022; 4 years ago as Persipasi Kota Bekasi
- Ground: Patriot Candrabhaga Stadium, Bekasi, West Java
- Capacity: 30,000
- Chairman: Tri Adhianto
- Manager: Syahrizal Harahap
- Coach: Didik Ludianto
- League: Liga 4
- 2024–25: Liga Nusantara/Relegation Round (Group K), 3rd (relegated)
Home colours	Away colours

Persatuan Sepakbola Indonesia Patriot Kota Bekasi (simply known as Persipasi; formerly known as Patriot Chandrabhaga and PCB Persipasi) is an Indonesian football club based in Bekasi, West Java that competes in the Liga 4. Their home base is Patriot Candrabhaga Stadium which is the inspiration for the club name.

In November 2021, Patriot Candrabhaga FC merged with Persipasi Bekasi to form PCB Persipasi and their target is to enter Liga 2. In May 2022, the club reverted their name back into Persipasi as an effort from Askot PSSI Bekasi to mend relations with the club's supporters who had alienated the club after their merger with Patriot Candrabhaga.

== History ==
In 2017, mayor of Bekasi formed a new football club called Patriot Chandrabhaga FC. The club was formed with the aim of football lovers in Bekasi, hoping that they can become the pride of the citizens. Since first formed, they played in the Liga 3. In 2021, Patriot Candrabhaga merged with Persipasi Bekasi and competed in Liga 3 Zone West Java under the name PCB Persipasi. PCB Persipasi is an official member of Asprov PSSI West Java.

However, the merger with Patriot Chandrabhaga did not go down well with Persipasi's supporters' groups who alienated the new entity. The demands were fulfilled by PSSI Bekasi City, following the conclusion of the 2021–22 Liga 3 season, with the club returning to their original name in May 2022. Bekasi's caretaker mayor Tri Adhianto was appointed as the club's new chairman. On 10 February 2025, Persipasi Kota Bekasi was relegated to the Liga 4 after a 1–3 defeat against Perserang Serang.

== Players ==
As of January 2025

Note: Flags indicate national team as defined under FIFA eligibility rules; some limited exceptions apply. Players may hold more than one non-FIFA nationality.

No.	Pos.	Nation	Player
1	GK	IDN	Ridho Tamani
2	DF	IDN	Falsa Reza
4	DF	IDN	Azril Shodiq
5	DF	IDN	Fathur Yan
6	MF	IDN	Fajrul Falah
7	FW	IDN	Farid Maulana
9	MF	IDN	Misbakhul Choiri
10	MF	IDN	Ramadani Kusuma
11	MF	IDN	Yoga Ariafianto
12	DF	IDN	Arief Kholiq
13	MF	IDN	Kariza Ikbal
14	MF	IDN	Khoirur Rozikin
15	FW	IDN	Ahmad Muzahran
16	MF	IDN	Sandi Prasetya
18	FW	IDN	Rizky Armando

No.	Pos.	Nation	Player
19	FW	IDN	Adam Malik (captain)
20	DF	IDN	Denny Shandy
21	MF	IDN	Faisal
22	FW	IDN	Sharuf Anizar
24	MF	IDN	Ubaydillah
25	GK	IDN	Fajar Ali Syahbana
26	DF	IDN	Abdul Razak Khatami
30	FW	IDN	Rahman Hadi
31	DF	IDN	Raymond Fernando
32	DF	IDN	Muhammad Arsyad
51	GK	IDN	Miftakhul Yunan (on loan from Persebaya Surabaya)
69	MF	IDN	Firgiawan Listianto
70	MF	IDN	Raffi Thalib
77	DF	IDN	Figo Sahetapy
88	FW	IDN	Wahidin Arifin

== Coaching staff ==
Position	Staff
Head coach	(Indonesia) Didik Ludianto
Assistant coach	(Indonesia) Jamal Yastro
Physical coach	(Indonesia) Abdullah Sapei
Goalkeeper coach	(Indonesia) Erry Abdullah

=== Management ===
Chairman	(Indonesia) Tri Adhianto
Manager	(Indonesia) Syahrizal Harahap
Media Officer	(Indonesia) Marsya Radina

== Season-by-season record ==
As Patriot Candrabhaga FC

Season(s)	League/Division	Tier	Tms.	Pos.	Piala Indonesia	AFC/AFF competition(s)	
2017	Liga 3	3	32	Eliminated in Play-off	–	–	–
2018	Liga 3	3	32	Eliminated in Regional round	First round	–	–
2019	Liga 3	3	32	Eliminated in Regional round	First round	–	–
2020	Liga 3	3	season abandoned		–	–	–

As PCB Persipasi/Persipasi

Season(s)	League/Division	Tier	Tms.	Pos.	Piala Indonesia	AFC/AFF competition(s)	
2021–22	Liga 3	3	64	3rd, Second round	–	–	–
2022–23	Liga 3	3	season abandoned		–	–	–
2023–24	Liga 3	3	80	3rd, Third round	–	–	–
2024–25	Liga Nusantara	3	16	3rd, Third round	–	–	–

== Honours ==
- Liga 3 West Java Series 1
  - Champions (2): 2022, 2023
