= 2024–25 Liga Nusantara =

First season of the Liga Nusantara in Indonesia

Liga Nusantara
- Season: 2024–25
- Dates: 13 December 2024 – 27 February 2025
- Champions: Sumut United; 1st Liga Nusantara title 2nd third-tier title
- Promoted: Sumut United; Tornado; Persiba Balikpapan
- Relegated: Kalteng Putra (withdrew); Sulut United (withdrew); Persipani (disqualified); 757 Kepri Jaya; Persikab; PCB Persipasi; PSCS; PSM Madiun
- Matches: 128
- Goals: 387 (3.02 per match)
- Best player: Yanuar Baehaki
- Top goalscorer: Ali Mashori (14 goals)
- Biggest home win: Waanal Brothers 7–0 PSM Madiun (10 February 2025)
- Biggest away win: PSM Madiun 0–5 Persekabpas (14 December 2024); PSDS 0–5 757 Kepri Jaya (19 December 2024)
- Highest scoring: Waanal Brothers 7–0 PSM Madiun (10 February 2025)
- Longest winning run: 5 matches Tornado
- Longest unbeaten run: 9 matches PSGC
- Longest winless run: 15 matches PSDS
- Longest losing run: 14 matches PSDS
- Highest attendance: 27,322; Persiba Balikpapan 2–1 NZR Sumbersari (19 February 2025)
- Lowest attendance: 10; Sumut United 1–1 PCB Persipasi (2 January 2025)
- Total attendance: 70,393
- Average attendance: 550

The 2024–25 Liga Nusantara (also known as the 2024–25 PNM Liga Nusantara for sponsorship reasons) is the inaugural season of the Liga Nusantara under its current name and the 9th season under its current league structure. For the first time since its establishment, the competition will be organised by I-League (Indonesia), after previous editions were organised by both Provincial Association of PSSI and PSSI themselves, thus abolishing the provincial and national phase format.

Adhyaksa was the champions in the 2023–24 Liga 3 season.

== Rules ==
Here are the regulations for the 2024–25 season:

=== Participating clubs ===
Only 16 teams will participate in the 2024–25 Liga Nusantara season – the 6 relegated teams from the 2023–24 Liga 2 and the remaining 10 teams from the 2023–24 Liga 3 Round of 16 (National phase).

=== Player ===
The player registration period begins on 18 November 2024 and will end on 23 December 2024. Each team can register a maximum of up to 30 players, with the following requirements:

- At least 15 U-23 players must be registered.
- At least 5 U-20 players must be registered.
- A maximum of 10 players of free age (senior players) can be registered.

=== Format ===
The league format was announced on 7 November 2024. For this season, there will be no provincial or national phase. Instead, there will be four rounds:

- Regular round: 16 teams being divided into two group of eight, with the round being played in a centralized format of double round-robin matches. The top three teams of each group will qualify for the championship round, while the remaining teams will qualify for the relegation play-offs.
- Relegation play-offs: 9 teams will be divided into two groups of five teams, with the round will be played in a centralized format of single round-robin matches. The bottom three teams of each group will be relegated to the 2025–26 Liga 4.
- Championship round: 6 teams will be divided into two groups of three teams, with the round will be played in home-and-away round-robin matches. The group winners will advance to the final and promoted to the 2025–26 Liga 2. The group runners-up will enter to the promotion play-off.
- Promotion play-off & Final: The play-off and final will be played as a single match. If tied after regulation time, extra time and, if necessary, a penalty shoot-out will be used to decide the winning team. The winner of the play-off match will be promoted to the 2025–26 Liga 2, while the winner of the final match being crowned as champions.

== Teams ==
16 teams will compete in the league – six teams relegated from the 2023–24 Liga 2 and ten teams from the 2023–24 Liga 3 national phase third round who were not promoted to the 2024–25 Liga 2.

=== Teams changes ===
The following teams changed division after the 2023–24 season.

▲ Promoted to 2024–25 Liga 2	▼ Relegated from 2023–24 Liga 2	Withdrawn teams
Adhyaksa; Dejan; Persibo; Persikas; Persikota; Persiku	Kalteng Putra; Perserang; Persiba Balikpapan; Persikab; PSCS; PSDS; Sumut United; Sulut United	~~Kalteng Putra~~; ~~Sulut United~~

Both Kalteng Putra and Sulut United withdrew from the league before the start of the season, reducing the initial 18 teams to 16.

=== Name changes ===
- Sada Sumut removed "Sada" from its official name and change their full name to Sumut United Football Club from this season.

=== Teams by province ===
Rank	Province	Number	Teams
1	East Java	3	NZR Sumbersari, Persekabpas, and PSM Madiun
1	West Java	3	PCB Persipasi, Persikab, and PSGC
3	Central Papua	2	Persipani and Waanal Brothers
3	North Sumatra	2	PSDS and Sumut United
5	Banten	1	Perserang
5	Central Java	1	PSCS
5	East Kalimantan	1	Persiba Balikpapan
5	Riau	1	Tornado
5	Riau Islands	1	757 Kepri Jaya
5	(Special Region of Yogyakarta) Yogyakarta	1	Persiba Bantul

=== Locations and stadiums ===
Locations of non-Java-based 2024–25 Liga Nusantara teams.
Red: Group 1; Blue: Group 2
Locations of Java-based 2024–25 Liga Nusantara teams.
Red: Group 1; Blue: Group 2

Team	Location	Stadium	Capacity	2023–24 season
757 Kepri Jaya	Batam	Gelora Citramas	500	National Phase Third Round (4th in Group 4)
NZR Sumbersari	Malang	Gelora Soeprijadi, at Blitar (Note: NZR Sumbersari used Gelora Soeprijadi in Blitar as its home base for the championship round.)	15,000	National Phase Third Round (4th in Group 2)
Persekabpas	Pasuruan	R. Soedarsono	10,000	National Phase Fourth Round (4th in Group 1)
Perserang	Serang	Maulana Yusuf	15,000	3rd in Group A of Liga 2 Relegation Round (Relegated)
Persiba Balikpapan	Balikpapan	Batakan	40,000	4th in Group C of Liga 2 Relegation Round (Relegated)
Persiba Bantul	Bantul	Sultan Agung	35,000	National Phase Third Round (3rd in Group 4)
Persikab	Bandung	Si Jalak Harupat	27,000	4th in Group B of Liga 2 Relegation Round (Relegated)
Persipani	Paniai	Soeharto Field	0	National Phase Third Round (4th in Group 3)
PCB Persipasi	Bekasi	Patriot Candrabhaga	30,000	National Phase Third Round (3rd in Group 3)
PSCS	Cilacap	Wijayakusuma	20,000	3rd in Group D of Liga 2 Relegation Round (Relegated)
PSDS	Deli Serdang	Baharuddin Siregar	15,000	3rd in Group B of Liga 2 Relegation Round (Relegated)
PSGC	Ciamis	Galuh	20,000	National Phase Third Round (3rd in Group 2)
PSM Madiun	Madiun	Wilis	25,000	National Phase Third Round (4th in Group 1)
Sumut United	Karo	Sultan Agung, at Bantul (Note: Sumut United used Sultan Agung in Bantul as its home base for the championship round.)	35,000	4th in Group A of Liga 2 Relegation Round (Relegated)
Tornado	Pekanbaru	Sriwedari, at Surakarta (Note: Tornado used Sriwedari Stadium in Surakarta as its home base for the championship round.)	12,000	National Phase Fourth Round (4th in Group 2)
Waanal Brothers	Mimika	WBFC Soccer Field, at Bandung	0	National Phase Third Round (3rd in Group 1)

=== Personnel and kits ===
Note: Flags indicate national team as has been defined under FIFA eligibility rules. Players and coaches may hold more than one non-FIFA nationality.

Team	Head coach	Captain	Kit manufacturer	Main kit sponsor	Other kit sponsor(s)
757 Kepri Jaya	(Indonesia) Nazal Mustofa	(Indonesia) Faozan Musanef	(Indonesia) Made by club	Indofood	List: Front: Bintan Resorts, Club Air Mineral; Back: Batamindo; Sleeves: None; Shorts: None
NZR Sumbersari	(Indonesia) Agus Yuwono	(Indonesia) Gedhong Tangguh	(Indonesia) Samba Apparel	W&B	List: Front: NZR Group; Back: None; Sleeves: PhysioWell.Mlg, Alamo Waters; Shorts: None
Persekabpas	(Indonesia) Masdra Nurriza	(Indonesia) Ricko Hardiansyah	(Indonesia) TM Sportswear	None	List: Front: None; Back: None; Sleeves: Gaung Catering Service; Shorts: None
Perserang	(Indonesia) Ricky Riskandi	(Indonesia) Suandi	(Indonesia) CRV	None	List: Front: None; Back: None; Sleeves: Air Gunung SLA; Shorts: None
Persiba Balikpapan	(Indonesia) Mohammad Nasuha	(Indonesia) Abdul Rachman	(Indonesia) Equalnesia	Cindara Pratama Group	List: Front: MIP Poultry, Angel’s Wing Indonesia, PTMB; Back: Bizhub 52X, Raja Lalapan; Sleeves: None; Shorts: None
Persiba Bantul	(Indonesia) Bambang Sumantri	(Indonesia) Fachrizal Ahnaf	(Indonesia) Almer Apparel	Muncul Group	List: Front: Sedayu General Hospital; Back: Cheers Air Mineral; Sleeves: Sayur Online Bantul; Shorts: None
Persikab	(Indonesia) Rasiman	(Indonesia) Sansan Husaeni	(Indonesia) Print Sport	None	List: Front: None; Back: None; Sleeves: None; Shorts: None
Persipani	(Indonesia) Muhammad Azhar		(Indonesia) SLEMN24	Anak Negeri Paniai	List: Front: Paniai Regency Government; Back: None; Sleeves: None; Shorts: None
PCB Persipasi	Vacant	(Indonesia) Mochamad Adam Malik	(Indonesia) Adhoc	None	List: Front: None; Back: PT Migas Bekasi, Adhoc; Sleeves: RS EMC Pekayon; Shorts: None
PSCS	(Indonesia) Roffy Wikongsinarjo	(Indonesia) Robi Kriswantoro	(Indonesia) Nine	PSF Group	List: Front: None; Back: None; Sleeves: None; Shorts: None
PSDS	(Indonesia) Nasrul Koto	(Indonesia) Raka Askara	(Indonesia) WWJD Sport	Aura Air Minum (regular round) / None (relegation round)	List: Front: None; Back: WWJD Sport; Sleeves: None; Shorts: None
PSGC	(Indonesia) Herry Kiswanto	(Indonesia) Ganjar Kurniawan	(Indonesia) Zestien	Bank BJB	List: Front: Putra AR, Rizquna Tour & Travel; Back: None; Sleeves: None; Shorts: None
PSM Madiun	(Indonesia) Edy Santoso	(Indonesia) Obet Yulius	(Indonesia) Leezuard	None	List: Front: None; Back: None; Sleeves: None; Shorts: None
Sumut United	(Indonesia) Ridwan Saragih	(Indonesia) Muhammad Irfan	(Indonesia) Bocorocco Active	None	List: Front: None; Back: Perkebunan Nusantara III, PLN; Sleeves: Jasa Raharja, Hutama Karya, Inalum; Shorts: None
Tornado	(Indonesia) I Wayan Sukadana	(Indonesia) Feri Aman Saragih	(Indonesia) Oliver	None	List: Front: None; Back: None; Sleeves: None; Shorts: None
Waanal Brothers	(Indonesia) Sahala Saragih	(Indonesia) Rhoben Pulanda	(Indonesia) QZF	Waanal Coffee & Co.	List: Front: None; Back: None; Sleeves: None; Shorts: None

Notes:

1. Apparel made by club.

=== Coaching changes ===
==== Pre-season ====
Team	Outgoing head coach	Manner of departure	Date of vacancy	Replaced by	Date of appointment
Persikab	(Indonesia) I Putu Gede	End of contract	2 February 2024	(Indonesia) Rasiman	27 October 2024
Perserang	(Indonesia) Bonggo Pribadi	End of contract	2 February 2024	(Indonesia) Ricky Riskandi	11 November 2024
PSCS	(Indonesia) Jessie Mustamu	End of contract	3 February 2024	(Indonesia) Roffy Wikongsinarjo	13 December 2024
Persiba Balikpapan	(Indonesia) Rudy Eka Priyambada	End of contract	3 February 2024	(Indonesia) Amir Yusuf Pohan	20 October 2024
PSGC	(Indonesia) Heri Kotari	End of contract	25 May 2024	(Indonesia) Herry Kiswanto	20 September 2024
NZR Sumbersari	(Indonesia) Purwanto Suwondo	End of contract	25 May 2024	(Indonesia) Agus Yuwono	14 November 2024
757 Kepri Jaya	(Indonesia) Bona Simanjuntak	End of contract	25 May 2024	(Indonesia) Nazal Mustofa	13 December 2024
Persiba Bantul	(Indonesia) Endro Bawono	End of contract	25 May 2024	(Indonesia) Bambang Sumantri	13 December 2024
PSM Madiun	(Indonesia) Kodari Amir	End of contract	25 May 2024	(Indonesia) Edy Santoso	13 December 2024
Persipani	(Indonesia) Jimmy Saputro	End of contract	25 May 2024	(Indonesia) Muhammad Azhar	13 December 2024
Persekabpas	(Indonesia) Subangkit	End of contract	3 June 2024	(Indonesia) Irfan Junaidi (caretaker)	4 November 2024
Tornado	(Indonesia) Yudi Hendri	End of contract	3 June 2024	(Indonesia) Danang Suryadi	26 November 2024
PCB Persipasi	(Indonesia) Jamal Yastro	End of contract	20 June 2024	(Indonesia) Didik Ludianto	13 December 2024
Waanal Brothers	(Indonesia) Rochy Putiray	End of contract	30 June 2024	(Indonesia) Sahala Saragih	2 November 2024
Persekabpas	(Indonesia) Irfan Junaidi	End of caretaker role	4 November 2024	(Indonesia) Masdra Nurriza	26 November 2024
Sumut United	(Indonesia) Yusup Prasetiyo	End of contract	31 May 2024	(Indonesia) Ridwan Saragih	5 December 2024
Tornado	(Indonesia) Danang Suryadi	Change in club ownership	13 December 2024	(Indonesia) I Wayan Sukadana	13 December 2024
PSDS	(Indonesia) Imam Faisal	End of contract	30 June 2024	(Indonesia) Danang Suryadi	13 December 2024

==== During the season ====
Team	Outgoing head coach	Manner of departure	Date of vacancy	Round	Week	Position in table		Replaced by	Date of appointment
Team	Outgoing head coach	Manner of departure	Date of vacancy	Round	Week	Group	Position	Replaced by	Date of appointment
Persiba Balikpapan	(Indonesia) Amir Yusuf Pohan	Sacked	21 December 2024	Regular round	3	B	4th	(Indonesia) Mohammad Nasuha	23 December 2024
PCB Persipasi	(Indonesia) Didik Ludianto	Sacked	5 January 2025	Regular round	7	A	4th		
PSDS Deli Serdang	(Indonesia) Danang Suryadi	Sacked	9 January 2025	Regular round	9	A	8th	(Indonesia) Nasrul Koto	9 January 2025

== Regular round ==
A total of 16 teams will be drawn into 2 groups of eight teams based on the geographical location of their homebase. The regular round will be played in a centralized format of double round-robin matches.

The top three teams of each group will qualify for the championship round, while the remaining teams will qualify for the relegation play-offs.

=== Group A ===
All matches will be held at Banyuanyar Football Field, Kota Barat Football Field, Sriwaru Football Field, UNS Stadium and Sriwedari Stadium, all located in Surakarta.

Pos	Team	Pld	W	D	L	GF	GA	GD	Pts	Qualification	TRD	SUM	CMS	PBB	PSP	757	SRG	PDS
1	Tornado	14	9	2	3	27	14	+13	29	Qualification to the Championship round		1–0	1–2	0–1	2–1	1–0	2–0	5–0
2	Sumut United	14	7	5	2	21	7	+14	26	Qualification to the Championship round	2–1		0–0	0–0	1–1	3–1	3–0	6–0
3	PSGC	14	7	5	2	19	13	+6	26	Qualification to the Championship round	1–1	0–0		1–0	1–0	1–4	3–1	2–1
4	Persikab	14	6	4	4	19	14	+5	22	Qualification to the Relegation play-offs	1–2	2–1	1–1		1–1	1–0	0–1	3–0
5	PCB Persipasi	14	6	2	6	20	16	+4	20	Qualification to the Relegation play-offs	2–3	0–1	2–0	3–1		0–2	0–1	3–1
6	757 Kepri Jaya	14	5	3	6	25	20	+5	18	Qualification to the Relegation play-offs	2–3	0–0	1–1	1–3	0–2		3–2	4–1
7	Perserang	14	4	3	7	21	22	−1	15	Qualification to the Relegation play-offs	1–1	1–2	0–1	2–2	2–3	2–2		5–0
8	PSDS	14	0	0	14	6	52	−46	0	Qualification to the Relegation play-offs	1–4	0–2	1–5	1–3	0–2	0–5	0–3	

Source: Liga Nusantara 2024–25
Legend: Blue = home team win; Yellow = draw; Red = away team win.
Rules for classification: 1) Points; 2) Head-to-head points; 3) Head-to-head goal difference; 4) Head-to-head goals scored; 5) Goal difference; 6) Goals scored; 7) Fair-play points; 8) Draw.

=== Group B ===
All matches will be held at Ngurah Rai Stadium in Denpasar and Gelora Samudra Stadium in Badung.

Pos	Team	Pld	W	D	L	GF	GA	GD	Pts	Qualification	BPP	PAS	NZR	WAA	PBA	PSM	CLP	PSI
1	Persiba Balikpapan	12	7	4	1	21	11	+10	25	Qualification to the Championship round		2–0	1–1	0–0	2–1	1–0	3–1	
2	Persekabpas	12	8	0	4	30	16	+14	24	Qualification to the Championship round	2–3		2–4	1–2	3–0	5–0	2–1	
3	NZR Sumbersari	12	7	3	2	22	14	+8	24	Qualification to the Championship round	2–2	0–2		1–3	1–0	1–0	3–2	
4	Waanal Brothers	12	6	4	2	19	14	+5	22	Qualification to the Relegation play-offs	2–1	1–2	1–1		2–1	1–1	2–1	
5	Persiba Bantul	12	3	2	7	15	20	−5	11	Qualification to the Relegation play-offs	1–1	2–4	1–2	1–2		2–2	2–1	
6	PSM Madiun	12	2	3	7	11	29	−18	9	Qualification to the Relegation play-offs	1–4	0–5	0–2	3–2	0–3		2–1	
7	PSCS	12	0	2	10	11	25	−14	2	Qualification to the Relegation play-offs	0–1	1–2	0–4	1–1	0–1	2–2		
8	Persipani (D, R)	0	0	0	0	0	0	0	0	Disqualified (Note: Persipani was disqualified by the PSSI Disciplinary Committee for failing to send players and officials for three consecutive matches, with sanctions including relegation and a fine of IDR 150 million.)								

Source: Liga Nusantara 2024–25
Legend: Blue = home team win; Yellow = draw; Red = away team win.
Rules for classification: 1) Points; 2) Head-to-head points; 3) Head-to-head goal difference; 4) Head-to-head goals scored; 5) Goal difference; 6) Goals scored; 7) Fair-play points; 8) Draw.
(D) Disqualified; (R) Relegated

== Relegation play-offs ==
9 teams will be divided into two groups, with the round will be played in a centralized format of single round-robin matches.

The bottom three teams of each group will be relegated to the 2025–26 Liga 4.

=== Group J ===
All matches will be held at Kebo Giro Stadium in Boyolali Regency and Banyuanyar Football Field in Surakarta.

Pos	Team	Pld	W	D	L	GF	GA	GD	Pts	Relegation	PBA	PDS	PBB	757	CLP
1	Persiba Bantul	4	4	0	0	10	3	+7	12			4–2		2–0	
2	PSDS	4	1	1	2	7	8	−1	4 (Note: Tied on head-to-head points. Ranked on head-to-head goal difference: PSDS +1, Persikab 0, 757 Kepri Jaya 0, PSCS –1. Ranked on head-to-head goal scored: Persikab 4, 757 Kepri Jaya 3.)				3–1	0–1	
3	Persikab (R)	4	1	1	2	5	7	−2	4	Relegation to the 2025–26 Liga 4	1–3				2–0
4	757 Kepri Jaya (R)	4	1	1	2	3	5	−2	4	Relegation to the 2025–26 Liga 4			1–1		1–2
5	PSCS (R)	4	1	1	2	4	6	−2	4	Relegation to the 2025–26 Liga 4	0–1	2–2			

Source: Liga Nusantara 2024–25
Legend: Blue = home team win; Yellow = draw; Red = away team win.
Rules for classification: 1) Points; 2) Head-to-head points; 3) Head-to-head goal difference; 4) Head-to-head goals scored; 5) Goal difference; 6) Goals scored; 7) Fair-play points; 8) Draw.
(R) Relegated

=== Group K ===
All matches will be held at Ngurah Rai Stadium in Denpasar and Gelora Samudra Stadium in Badung Regency.

Pos	Team	Pld	W	D	L	GF	GA	GD	Pts	Relegation	WAA	SRG	PSP	PSM
1	Waanal Brothers	3	2	1	0	11	2	+9	7			2–2		7–0
2	Perserang	3	2	1	0	10	3	+7	7					5–0
3	PCB Persipasi (R)	3	1	0	2	3	6	−3	3	Relegation to the 2025–26 Liga 4	0–2	1–3		2–1
4	PSM Madiun (R)	3	0	0	3	1	14	−13	0	Relegation to the 2025–26 Liga 4				

Source: Liga Nusantara 2024–25
Legend: Blue = home team win; Yellow = draw; Red = away team win.
Rules for classification: 1) Points; 2) Head-to-head points; 3) Head-to-head goal difference; 4) Head-to-head goals scored; 5) Goal difference; 6) Goals scored; 7) Fair-play points; 8) Draw.
(R) Relegated

== Championship round ==
The top six teams from the regular round will be divided into 2 groups of three teams to play home-and-away round-robin matches.

The group winners will advanced to the final and automatically promoted to the 2025–26 Liga 2, while group runners-up will play in the Promotion play-off to determined which team will get the final promotion ticket.

=== Group X ===
Pos	Team	Pld	W	D	L	GF	GA	GD	Pts	Promotion or qualification	TRD	CMS	PAS
1	Tornado (P)	4	3	1	0	10	3	+7	10	Qualification to the Final and promotion to the 2025–26 Championship		3–0	4–1
2	PSGC	4	1	1	2	5	8	−3	4	Qualification to the Promotion play-off	1–1		3–2
3	Persekabpas	4	1	0	3	6	10	−4	3		1–2	2–1	

Source: Liga Nusantara 2024–25
Legend: Blue = home team win; Yellow = draw; Red = away team win.
Rules for classification: 1) Points; 2) Head-to-head points; 3) Head-to-head goal difference; 4) Head-to-head goals scored; 5) Goal difference; 6) Goals scored; 7) Fair-play points; 8) Draw.
(P) Promoted

=== Group Y ===
Pos	Team	Pld	W	D	L	GF	GA	GD	Pts	Promotion or qualification	SUM	BPP	NZR
1	Sumut United (P)	4	2	1	1	8	4	+4	7	Qualification to the Final and promotion to the 2025–26 Championship		1–0	1–1
2	Persiba Balikpapan (O, P)	4	2	1	1	5	4	+1	7	Qualification to the Promotion play-off	2–1		2–1
3	NZR Sumbersari	4	0	2	2	4	9	−5	2		1–5	1–1	

Source: Liga Nusantara 2024–25
Legend: Blue = home team win; Yellow = draw; Red = away team win.
Rules for classification: 1) Points; 2) Head-to-head points; 3) Head-to-head goal difference; 4) Head-to-head goals scored; 5) Goal difference; 6) Goals scored; 7) Fair-play points; 8) Draw.
(O) Play-off winners; (P) Promoted

== Promotion play-off ==
The play-off will be played as a single match. If tied after regulation time, extra time and, if necessary, a penalty shoot-out will be used to decide the winning team. The winner will be promoted to the 2025–26 Championship.

27 February 2025
15:00 UTC+7

PSGC	2–2 (a.e.t.)	Persiba Balikpapan
Kurniawan 85'; Wibisono 117'	Report	76', 108' (pen.) Dzumafo
Penalties
Rixi (penalty missed); Nurfadilah (penalty scored); Kurniawan (penalty scored); Wibisono (penalty missed); Hercules (penalty scored); Gandhi (penalty missed)	3–4	(penalty scored) Ilham; (penalty scored) Alamsyah; (penalty missed) Sukadana; (penalty missed) Riza; (penalty scored) Dzumafo; (penalty scored) Sabda

Indomilk Arena, Tangerang
Attendance: 0
Referee: Agung Setiyawan

== Final ==
The final will be played as a single match. If tied after regulation time, extra time and, if necessary, a penalty shoot-out will be used to decide the winning team.

27 February 2025
19:00 UTC+7

Tornado	1–4	Sumut United
Yoga 14'	Report	29', 42' Gagarin; 51' Aulia; 81' Nico Sitepu

Indomilk Arena, Tangerang
Attendance: 0
Referee: Yeni Krisdianto

== Season statistics ==
=== Top scorers ===
Rank	Player	Team	Goals
1	(Indonesia) Ali Mashori	Persekabpas	14
2	(Indonesia) Alvin Dwiguna	Waanal Brothers	13
3	(Indonesia) Elang Rishandy	757 Kepri Jaya	10
4	(Indonesia) Herman Dzumafo	Persiba Balikpapan	9
5	(Indonesia) Lorensius Sabda	Persiba Balikpapan	8
5	(Indonesia) Saeful Nur Rohman	Tornado	8
5	(Indonesia) Yanuar Baehaki	Tornado	8
8	(Indonesia) Dama Indrayana	Persiba Bantul	7
8	(Indonesia) Bayu Nugroho	Persikab	7
8	(Indonesia) Adam Malik	PCB Persipasi	7
11	Seven players		6
18	Four players		5
22	Fourteen players		4
36	Fifteen players		3
51	Twenty-eight players		2
79	Seventy-one players		1

=== Hat-tricks ===
Player	For	Against	Result	Date
(Indonesia) Elang Rishandy^{4}	757 Kepri Jaya	PSDS	5–0 (A)	19 December 2024
(Indonesia) Ali Mashori	Persekabpas	PSM Madiun	5–0 (H)	6 January 2025
(Indonesia) Alvin Dwiguna	Waanal Brothers	PSM Madiun	7–0 (H)	10 February 2025

Note: ^{4} – player scored 4 goals

== See also ==
- 2024–25 Liga 1
- 2024–25 Liga 2
- 2024–25 Liga 4
