= Ichwan Tuharea =

Indonesian footballer

Personal information
- Full name: Ichwan Tuharea
- Date of birth: 14 November 2000 (age 25)
- Place of birth: Ambon, Indonesia
- Height: 1.71 m (5 ft 7 in)
- Position: Midfielder

Youth career
- 2015–2016: Frenz United
- 2016–2017: SSB Nusantara Mahosi
- 2017: ASAD 313 Jaya Perkasa
- 2018: Borneo
- 2019–2020: Bhayangkara

Senior career*
Years	Team	Apps	(Gls)
2019–2023	Bhayangkara	3	(0)
2022	→ PSMS Medan (loan)	0	(0)
- * Club domestic league appearances and goals as of 20 March 2022

Ichwan Tuharea (born 14 November 2000) is an Indonesian professional footballer who plays as a midfielder.

== Club career ==
=== Bhayangkara ===
He was signed for Bhayangkara to play in Liga 1 in the 2019 season. Ichwan made his professional debut on 20 February 2022 in a match against Persikabo 1973 at the Kompyang Sujana Stadium, Denpasar.

==== Loan to PSMS Medan ====
On 2022, Ichwan Tuharea signed with Liga 2 club PSMS Medan, on loan from Liga 1 club Bhayangkara.

== Career statistics ==
=== Club ===
As of 20 March 2022.

Club	Season	League			Cup		Other		Total	
Club	Season	Division	Apps	Goals	Apps	Goals	Apps	Goals	Apps	Goals
Bhayangkara	2019	Liga 1	0	0	0	0	0	0	0	0
Bhayangkara	2020	Liga 1	0	0	0	0	0	0	0	0
Bhayangkara	2021–22	Liga 1	3	0	0	0	0	0	3	0
Bhayangkara	2022–23	Liga 1	0	0	0	0	0	0	0	0
PSMS Medan (loan)	2022–23	Liga 2	0	0	0	0	0	0	0	0
Career total			3	0	0	0	0	0	3	0
