= Kendal Tornado F.C. =

Kendal Tornado
- Full name: Kendal Tornado Football Club
- Nickname: Laskar Badai Pantura (The North Java Coast Storm Warriors)
- Short name: KTFC; TRD
- Founded: 2018; 8 years ago, as Tornado FC Pekanbaru
- Ground: Kebondalem Stadium
- Capacity: 15,000
- Owner: Wahyu Agung Group
- Head coach: Stefan Keltjes
- League: Championship
- 2025–26: Championship Group 2, 4th of 10
Home colours	Away colours

Kendal Tornado Football Club (formerly known as Tornado FC Pekanbaru) is an Indonesian professional football club based in Kendal, Central Java. They compete in the Championship, the second tier of the Indonesian football league system, and their homebase is Kebondalem Stadium.

== History ==
The club was founded in 2018 as Tornado Football Club Pekanbaru and played its inaugural season that same year. The club was crowned champions of the 2019 Liga 3 Riau and finished as runners-up in both 2021 and 2023. Tornado joined the Liga Nusantara for the 2024–25 season. On 17 February 2025, the club secured promotion to the second league for the first time in its history, following a 3–0 victory over PSGC in Matchweek 5 of the Championship Round, Group X. Ahead of the 2025–26 season, the club relocated its home base to Kendal, Central Java, and officially changed its name to Kendal Tornado Football Club.

== Players ==
=== Current squad ===
As of September 2026

Note: Flags indicate national team as defined under FIFA eligibility rules; some limited exceptions apply. Players may hold more than one non-FIFA nationality.

No.	Pos.	Nation	Player
4	DF	IDN	Fikron Afriyanto
6	MF	IDN	Ryan Aprianto
7	FW	JPN	Yushi Yamaya
8	MF	IDN	Andre Oktaviansyah
9	FW	BRA	Patrick Cruz
10	MF	BRA	Diego Dall'Oca
11	MF	IDN	Yudha Alkanza
12	FW	IDN	Rizky Dwi Pangestu
13	DF	IDN	Agung Prasetyo
14	FW	IDN	Alfath Diaz
15	DF	IDN	Syaeful Anwar
16	MF	IDN	Irpan Siregar
17	MF	IDN	Rangga Lesmana
19	MF	IDN	Dwi Geno Nofiansyah
20	MF	IDN	Jovan Al Ghony
21	DF	IDN	Aziz Luayyan
22	MF	IDN	Ibnu Hajar
24	DF	IDN	Muhammad Fatchurohman
25	DF	IDN	Zico Salmon (on loan from Borneo Samarinda)

No.	Pos.	Nation	Player
26	GK	IDN	Alim Hidayatullah
27	DF	IDN	Dimas Sukarno (captain)
29	MF	IDN	Jonier Kareth
30	DF	IDN	Afnan Hafidz
31	DF	IDN	Ahmad Birrul Walidain
33	DF	IDN	Jody Kurniady (on loan from Borneo Samarinda)
34	GK	IDN	Try Hamdani
37	GK	IDN	Er Deva Aulia
46	DF	IDN	Fredyan Wahyu
57	MF	IDN	Akbar Firmansyah
67	DF	IDN	Ferian Rizki
69	GK	IDN	Rafi Pamungkas
86	MF	IDN	Rifal Lastori
99	FW	IDN	Ousmane Maiket (on loan from Borneo Samarinda)

== Coaching staff ==
As of September 2026

Position	Name
Technical director	(Brazil) Danilo Fernando
Head coach	(Indonesia) Stefan Keeltjes
Assistant coach	(Indonesia) Ridwan Oesman
Physical coach	(Indonesia) Abil Mahdi Almukhdlor
Goalkeeper coach	(Indonesia) Ruben Christof

== Season-by-season records ==
Season(s)	League/Division	Tms.	Pos.	Piala Indonesia	I-League Cup
2018	Liga 3	32	Eliminated in Provincial round	–	–
2019	Liga 3	32	4th, First round	–	–
2020	Liga 3	season abandoned		–	–
2021–22	Liga 3	64	4th, First round	–	–
2022–23	Liga 3	season abandoned		–	–
2023–24	Liga 3	80	4th, Fourth round	–	–
2024–25	Liga Nusantara	16	2	–	–
2025–26	Championship	20	4th, Group 2	–	–
2026–27	Championship	20	TBD	–	TBD

== Honours ==
- Liga 3 Riau
  - Champion (1): 2019
  - Runner-up (2): 2021, 2023
- Liga Nusantara
  - Runner-up (1): 2024–25

== Name and logo changes ==
Tornado FC Pekanbaru (2024–2025)

Kendal Tornado FC (2025–present)
