= Liga Nusantara =

Third tier in Indonesian football league system

- Organising body: PSSI (2014–2024); I-League (2024–present)
- Founded: 2014; 12 years ago, as Liga Nusantara in 4th tier; 2017; 9 years ago, as Liga 3; 2024; 2 years ago, as Liga Nusantara in 3rd tier
- Country: Indonesia
- Confederation: AFC
- Number of clubs: 24
- Level on pyramid: 3
- Promotion to: Championship
- Relegation to: Liga 4
- Domestic cup: Piala Indonesia
- Current champions: RANS Nusantara; 1st Liga Nusantara title 1st third-tier title (2025–26)
- Most championships: Sumut United; 2 Liga Nusantara titles 2 third-tier titles
- Broadcasters: YouTube (I-League TV); Nusantara TV
- Website: Official website
- Current: 2026–27 Liga Nusantara

Liga Nusantara (English: Archipelago League) is the third-tier of the football competition system in Indonesia, organized by the Football Association of Indonesia (PSSI). The competition started in 2014 after PSSI merged the previous competitions, Liga Indonesia Second Division and Liga Indonesia Third Division. The competition was previously organized in two phases, with the provincial phase operated by PSSI Provincial Associations, where each province held its own regional competition, followed by the national phase operated by PSSI, where the top teams from each province competed at the national level.

Starting from the 2024–25 season, the competition is organized on a national level with teams divided into several groups based on geographical factors and is now operated by the I-League.

== History ==
The competition was established after Liga Indonesia Second Division and Liga Indonesia Third Division merged in 2014. Starting in 2015, the Liga Indonesia First Division was also merged with Liga Nusantara to become the third-tier level in Indonesian football system. Persatu Tuban won the competition's first season.

In 2017, Liga Nusantara was renamed to Liga 3, along with Indonesian Super League and Indonesian Premier Division which were renamed to Liga 1 and Liga 2, respectively.

In 2024, Liga 3 was renamed back to the Liga Nusantara, along with the establishment of Liga 4 as fourth-tier level. Liga Nusantara was elevated to a semi-professional level after previously being at the amateur level.

== Format ==
=== Old format ===
==== Provincial phase ====
Each province held a provincial phase, they were followed by amateur clubs without a limit of participants with different competition formats, the difference in the format was due to the different number of participants in each province. Furthermore, the teams that qualified from the provincial phase competed in national phase.

==== National phase ====
A total of 80 teams entered this phase.

- First round: 80 teams were divided into sixteen groups of 5. Each group was played on a home tournament basis. Winner and runner-up of each group advanced to the second round.
- Second round: 32 teams which were the winners and runners-up from each group of the first round. They were divided into eight groups of 4 and each winner and runner-up advanced to the third round.
- Third round: 16 teams were divided into two groups. Each group was played on a home tournament basis. Same as previous round, the winner and runner-up of each group advanced to the fourth round.
- Fourth round: 8 teams were divided into two groups. The three best teams of each group were promoted to the Liga 2. The winner of each group also advanced to the final.
- Final: The 2 group winners from the fourth round played in the final match. The final was played as a single match.

=== New format ===
==== 2024–25 season ====
The league format was announced on 7 November 2024. There was no provincial or national phase. Instead, there were four rounds:

- Regular round: 16 teams were divided into two group of eight, with the round being played in a centralized format of double round-robin matches. The top three teams of each group qualified for the championship round, while the remaining teams qualified for the relegation play-offs.
- Relegation play-offs: 10 teams were divided into two groups of five teams, with the round being played in a centralized format of single round-robin matches. The bottom three teams of each group were relegated to the 2025–26 Liga 4.
- Championship round: 6 teams were divided into two groups of three teams, with the round being played in home-and-away round-robin matches. The group winners advanced to the final and promoted to the 2025–26 Liga 2. The group runners-up entered to the promotion play-off.
- Promotion play-off & Final: The play-off and final were played as a single match. If tied after regulation time, it went to extra time and a penalty shoot-out to decide the winning team if necessary. The winner of the play-off match was promoted to the 2025–26 Liga 2, while the winner of the final match was crowned as champions.

==== 2025–26 season ====
There were two rounds:

- Regular round: 24 teams were divided into four groups of six, the round being played in a centralized format of triple round-robin matches. The top two teams advanced to the knockout round, the fifth placed-team entered the relegation play-off, and the sixth-placed teams were immediately relegated to the 2026–27 Liga 4.
- Knockout round: The round was played as a single match. The winners of the semi-final matches and then the winner of the promotion play-off match were promoted to the 2026–27 Championship, while the losers of the relegation play-off matches were relegated to the 2026–27 Liga 4. The winner of the final was crowned as the champions.

==== 2026–27 season ====
There will be three rounds:

- Regular round: 24 teams were divided into three groups of eight, with the format being played in a home-and-away format of double round-robin matches. Group winners, group runners-up, and two best group third-place finishers will advance to the round of eight. No team will be relegated to the 2027–28 Liga 4 unless anyone fails to obtain a Liga Nusantara license or withdraws.
- Round of eight: Eight teams will be divided into two groups of four, with the round being played in a centralized format of single round-robin matches. Group winners will advance to the final and will promoted to the 2027–28 Championship by obtaining that league's license. Group runners-up will enter the promotion play-off.
- Promotion play-off and final: The play-off and final will be played as a single match. If tied after regulation time, it went to extra time and a penalty shoot-out to decide the winning team if necessary. The winner of the play-off match will be promoted to the 2027–28 Championship by obtaining that league's license, while the winner of the final match will be crowned as champions.

== Teams ==
=== Maps ===
Locations of teams in the 2026–27 Liga Nusantara.
Locations of teams in the 2026–27 Liga Nusantara from Java region.

.

=== Current participating teams ===
The following 24 clubs will compete in the Liga Nusantara during 2026–27 season.

| Team | Location | 2025–26 position | Year joined | Seasons in LN | First season in D3 | Seasons in D3 | Current spell in D3 | Last spell in CH | Former names | Other leagues |
|---|---|---|---|---|---|---|---|---|---|---|
| Batavia | South Jakarta | Quarter-finals | 2017 | 9 | 2017 | 9 | 2025– | — | — | — |
| Donggala United | Donggala | 10th in Group 2 (Championship) | 2011 | 2 | 2017 | 2 | 2026– | 2018–2026 | | — |
| Gresik United | Gresik | 4th in Group D | 2006 | 5 | 2019 | 5 | 2025– | 2022–2025 | — | — |
| Pasuruan United | Pasuruan City | Champions (Liga 4) | 2013 | 4 | 2022–23 | 4 | 2026– | — | | — |
| Pekanbaru | Pekanbaru | Quarter-finals | 2024–25 | 2 | 2025–26 | 2 | 2025– | — | — | — |
| Perseden | Denpasar | 3rd in Group D | 1994–95 | 9 | 2013 | 13 | 2025– | — | — | (Note: 2016 ISC Liga Nusantara) |
| Persekabpas | Pasuruan Regency | Quarter-finals | 1994–95 | 10 | 2009–10 | 17 | 2017– | 2008–2009 | — | (Note: 2011–12 First Division (LPIS)) |
| Persekat | Tegal | Lost relegation play-off (Championship) | 2006 | 4 | 2016 | 5 | 2026– | 2020–2026 | — | — |
| Persiba Bantul | Bantul | 4th | 1994–95 | 9 | 2018 | 9 | 2018– | 2015–2017 | — | — |
| Persibangga | Purbalingga | 3rd in NP R4 Group B (Liga 4) | 2006 | 7 | 2011–12 | 8 | 2026– | 2013–2017 | — | |
| Persibo | Bojonegoro | 3rd in Group C | 2002 | 9 | 2017 | 9 | 2025– | 2024–2025 | — | — |
| Persika Karanganyar | Karanganyar | Quarter-finals | 2006 | 5 | 2021–22 | 5 | 2025– | — | — | — |
| Persikota | Tangerang | 3rd in Group B | 1994–95 | 9 | 2014 | 12 | 2025– | 2024–2025 | — | |
| Persikotas Nusantara | Tasikmalaya | 3rd in Group A | 2021 | 3 | 2021–22 | 3 | 2025– | 2022–2025 | | — |
| Persikutim United | East Kutai | Won relegation play-off | 2018 | 9 | 2018 | 9 | 2018– | — | | — |
| Persinab | Nabire | 4th in Group C | 2018 | 9 | 2018 | 9 | 2025– | — | | — |
| Persinga | Ngawi | Semi-finals (Liga 4) | 2004 | 7 | 2013 | 8 | 2026– | 2014–2017 | — | |
| Persipa | Pati | 4th in Group A | 1994–95 | 7 | 2010 | 13 | 2025– | 2022–2025 | — | |
| Persipani | Paniai | 3rd in NP R4 Group A (Liga 4) | 1994–95 | 9 | 2011–12 | 14 | 2026– | — | — | — |
| Persitara | North Jakarta | Won relegation play-off | 1994–95 | 9 | 2015 | 11 | 2025– | 2010–2014 | — | — |
| Pesik | Kuningan | Runners-up (Liga 4) | 2004 | 7 | 2008–09 | 12 | 2026– | — | — | |
| PSN | Ngada | Semi-finals (Liga 4) | 2004 | 7 | 2016 | 8 | 2026– | — | — | |
| Putra Sang Fajar | Blitar | 4th in Group B | 2021–22 | 5 | 2021–22 | 5 | 2025– | — | | — |
| Sriwijaya | Palembang | 10th in Group 1 (Championship) | 2005 | 1 | 2026–27 | 1 | 2026– | 2019–2026 | — | — |

| Recently relegated from Championship |
| Recently promoted from Liga 4 |

- "Year joined" is the year the club joined the Liga Indonesia, including leagues that are divisionally below it and counted since 1994–95 season.
- "First season in D3" and "Seasons in D3" counted since First Division dropped down to third-tier and also including of LPIS First Division during dualism era (2011–2012) and ISC Liga Nusantara in 2016 season.
- "Seasons in LN" and "Current spell in D3" counted since the third-tier league was renamed as Liga 3 and later changed to Liga Nusantara.
- "Last spell in CH" counted since Premier Division dropped down to second-tier (now Championship), including LPIS Premier Division during dualism era (2011–2013) and ISC B in 2016 season.

Former names

1. Donggala United (DGL): previously as Aceh United.
2. Pasuruan United (PSU): previously as Persema 1953.
3. Persikotas Nusantara (TSK): previously as Mataram Utama.
4. Persikutim United (KTM): previously as Sumbersari FC.
5. Persinab (NBR): previously as Sang Maestro.
6. Putra Sang Fajar (PSF): previously as Tri Brata Rafflesia.

Breakaway league

Unofficial league

=== Former teams ===
The following clubs competed in the Liga Nusantara since 2024–25 season, but are not competing in the 2026–27 season.

| Team | Location | Year joined | Seasons in LN | First season in D3 | Seasons in D3 | Last spell in D3 | Current league | Former names |
|---|---|---|---|---|---|---|---|---|
| 757 Kepri Jaya | Batam | 2008–09 | 7 | 2013 | 7 | 2018–2025 | Liga 4 | |
| de Red | Surabaya | 2022–23 | 3 | 2022–23 | 3 | 2025–2026 | Championship | |
| Kalteng Putra | Palangka Raya | 2001 | 1 | 2008–09 | 4 | 2024–2025 | Defunct | — |
| Kendal Tornado | Kendal | 2018 | 7 | 2018 | 7 | 2018–2025 | Championship | |
| Persebata | Lembata | 1999 | 8 | 2017 | 8 | 2025–2026 | Liga 4 | — |
| Perserang | Serang | 1994–95 | 2 | 2011–12 | 6 | 2024–2026 | Liga 4 | — |
| Persewar | Waropen | 2005 | 3 | 2011–12 | 8 | 2025–2026 | Liga 4 | — |
| Persiba Balikpapan | Balikpapan | 1994–95 | 1 | 2024–25 | 1 | 2024–2025 | Championship | — |
| Persikab | Bandung | 1994–95 | 6 | 2016 | 8 | 2024–2025 | Liga 4 | — |
| Persikabo 1973 | Bogor | 2016 | 1 | 2025–26 | 1 | 2025–2026 | Liga 4 | |
| Persikad | Depok | 2019 | 4 | 2019 | 4 | 2024–2025 | Championship | |
| Persipasi | Bekasi | 2017 | 8 | 2017 | 8 | 2017–2025 | Liga 4 | |
| PSCS | Cilacap | 1994–95 | 2 | 2009–10 | 3 | 2024–2025 | Liga 4 | — |
| PSDS | Deli Serdang | 1994–95 | 7 | 2011–12 | 12 | 2024–2026 | Liga 4 | — |
| PSGC | Ciamis | 1994–95 | 7 | 2011–12 | 9 | 2020–2026 | Championship | — |
| PSM Madiun | Madiun | 1994–95 | 7 | 2018 | 7 | 2018–2025 | Liga 4 | — |
| RANS Nusantara | Batu | 2013 | 2 | 2014 | 2 | 2025–2026 | Championship | |
| Sulut United | Manado | 2017 | 2 | 2018 | 2 | 2024–2025 | — | |
| Waanal Brothers | Mimika | 2022–23 | 4 | 2022–23 | 4 | 2022–2026 | Liga 4 | — |

| Recently promoted to Championship |
| Recently relegated to Liga 4 |

- "Year joined" is the year the club joined the Liga Indonesia, including leagues that are divisionally below it and counted since 1994–95 season.
- "First season in D3" and "Seasons in D3" counted since First Division dropped down to third-tier and also including of LPIS First Division during dualism era (2011–2013) and ISC Liga Nusantara.
- "Season in LN" and "Last spell in D3" counted since the third-tier league was renamed as Liga 3 and later changed to Liga Nusantara.

Former names

1. 757 Kepri Jaya (757): previously as Bintang Jaya Asahan.
2. de Red (RFC): previously as Dejan.
3. Kendal Tornado (TRD): previously as Tornado Pekanbaru.
4. Persikabo 1973 (PBO): previously as PS TNI.
5. Persikad (PKD): previously as Karo United.
6. Persipasi (PSI): previously as Patriot Candrabhaga.
7. RANS Nusantara (RNS): previously as Cilegon United.
8. Sulut United (SUL): previously as Bogor Football Club.

== Championship history ==
=== Old format ===
==== One-legged finals ====
| Season | League name | Champions | Score | Runners-up |
|---|---|---|---|---|
| 2014 | Liga Nusantara | Persatu Tuban | 2–1 | Laga |
| 2015 | Liga Nusantara | season abandoned due to FIFA suspension of Indonesia | | |
| 2017 | Liga 3 | Blitar United | 2–1 | Persik Kendal |
| 2019 | Liga 3 | Persijap Jepara | 3–1 | PSKC Cimahi |
| 2020 | Liga 3 | cancelled due to COVID-19 pandemic in Indonesia | | |
| 2021–22 | Liga 3 | Karo United | 3–3 (4–2 p) | Putra Delta Sidoarjo |
| 2022–23 | Liga 3 | season abandoned after Kanjuruhan Stadium disaster | | |
| 2023–24 | Liga 3 | Adhyaksa Farmel | 3–2 (a.e.t.) | Persibo Bojonegoro |

==== Two-legged final ====
| Season | League name | Home team | Score | Away team |
|---|---|---|---|---|
| 2018 | Liga 3 | Persik Kediri | 3–1 | PSCS Cilacap |
| 2018 | Liga 3 | PSCS Cilacap | 1–0 | Persik Kediri |
| 2018 | Liga 3 | Persik Kediri won 3–2 on aggregate | | |

=== New format ===
| Season | League name | Champions | Score | Runners-up |
|---|---|---|---|---|
| 2024–25 | Liga Nusantara | Sumut United | 4–1 | Tornado |
| 2025–26 | Liga Nusantara | RANS Nusantara | 2–2 (4–3 p) | Dejan |
| 2026–27 | Liga Nusantara | | | |

== Promotion history ==
=== Old format ===
| Season | Promoted teams | Total |
|---|---|---|
| 2014 | Persatu Tuban; Laga; Perssu Sumenep; PS Badung; Perserang Serang; Persibas Banyumas | 6 |
| 2017 | Blitar United; Persik Kendal; Aceh United | 3 |
| 2018 | Persik Kediri; PSCS Cilacap; Persatu Tuban; PSGC Ciamis; Persewar Waropen; Bogor | 6 |
| 2019 | Persijap Jepara; PSKC Cimahi; KS Tiga Naga; Persekat Tegal; Putra Sinar Giri; Semeru | 6 |
| 2021–22 | Karo United; Putra Delta Sidoarjo; PSDS Deli Serdang; Mataram Utama; Deltras; Persikab Bandung; Persipa Pati; Gresik United | 8 |
| 2023–24 | Adhyaksa Farmel; Persibo Bojonegoro; Dejan; Persikota Tangerang; Persiku Kudus; Persikas Subang | 6 |

=== New format ===
| Season | Champions | Runners-up | Third place |
|---|---|---|---|
| 2024–25 | Sumut United | Tornado | Persiba Balikpapan |
| 2025–26 | RANS Nusantara | Dejan | PSGC Ciamis |
| 2026–27 | | | |

== Relegation history ==
| Season | Relegated teams | Total |
|---|---|---|
| 2024–25 | Kalteng Putra (withdrew); Sulut United (withdrew); Persipani Paniai (disqualified); 757 Kepri Jaya; Persikab Bandung; PCB Persipasi; PSCS Cilacap; PSM Madiun | 8 |
| 2025–26 | Persikabo 1973 (withdrew); Persewar (withdrew); Persebata; Perserang; PSDS; Waanal Brothers | 6 |
| 2026–27 | None (Note: I-League director Ferry Paulus said that the league would have no relegation, but the regulation has not yet been published.) | 0 |

== Awards ==
=== Best players ===
| Season | Player | Club |
|---|---|---|
| 2014 | (Indonesia) Edi Winarno | Persatu Tuban |
| 2017 | (Indonesia) Assanur Rijal | Aceh United |
| 2018 | (Indonesia) Galih Akbar | Persik Kediri |
| 2019 | (Indonesia) Rizki Hidayat | Persijap Jepara |
| 2021–22 | (Indonesia) Rian Ramadan | Karo United |
| 2023–24 | (Indonesia) Sehabudin Ahmad | Adhyaksa Farmel |
| 2024–25 | (Indonesia) Yanuar Baehaki | Tornado |
| 2025–26 | (Indonesia) Wawan Sumadi | Dejan |
| 2026–27 | | |

=== Top scorers ===
| Season | Top scorer | Club | Goals |
|---|---|---|---|
| 2014 | (Indonesia) Imam Bagus Kurnia | Laga | 4 |
| 2017 | (Indonesia) Arianto | Aceh United | 7 |
| 2018 | (Indonesia) Septian Bagaskara | Persik Kediri | 21 |
| 2019 | (Indonesia) Rikza Syawali | PSKC Cimahi | 9 |
| 2021–22 | (Indonesia) Adam Malik | Putra Delta Sidoarjo | 11 |
| 2023–24 | (Indonesia) Andi Sopian | Dejan | 9 |
| 2024–25 | (Indonesia) Ali Mashori | Persekabpas Pasuruan | 14 |
| 2025–26 | (Indonesia) Donald Bissa | Dejan | 11 |
| 2026–27 | | | |

=== Fair play awards ===
| Season | Club |
|---|---|
| 2018 | Persik Kediri |
| 2019 | PSKC Cimahi |
| 2021–22 | Mataram Utama |
| 2023–24 | Dejan |
| 2024–25 | Persiba Balikpapan |
| 2026–27 | |

== Title sponsors ==
| Period | Sponsor(s) | Brand | Ref. |
|---|---|---|---|
| 2014 | no sponsors | Liga Nusantara | – |
| 2017–2024 | no sponsors | Liga 3 | – |
| 2024–2025 | PNM | PNM Liga Nusantara | |
| 2025–present | no sponsors | Liga Nusantara | |

== See also ==
- Indonesian football league system
- Super League
- Championship
- Liga 4
- Piala Indonesia
