= PSGC Ciamis =

Indonesian football club

- Full name: Persatuan Sepakbola Galuh Ciamis
- Nicknames: Laskar Singacala (Singacala Warriors)
- Short name: CMS
- Founded: 26 August 1990; 36 years ago
- Ground: Galuh Stadium
- Capacity: 20,000
- Owner: PT Galuh Lingga Wastu
- Chairman: Herdiat Sunarya
- Head coach: Herry Kiswanto
- League: Championship
- 2025–26: Liga Nusantara, 3rd (promoted via playoff)
- Website: http://www.psgc.co.id/
Home colours	Away colours

Persatuan Sepakbola Galuh Ciamis, commonly known as PSGC Ciamis or PSGC, is an Indonesian professional football club based in Ciamis Regency, West Java. They play in the Championship, following promotion from the Liga Nusantara in 2026. PSGC's most common nickname is Laskar Singacala.

== History ==
During the Dutch East Indies era, Ciamis Regency introduced the name Persig (Persatuan Sepakbola Indonesia Galuh). After independence of Indonesia, the name was changed to Persigal (Persatuan Sepakbola Indonesia Galuh). In 1990, Persigal changed its name to PSGC (Persatuan Sepakbola Galuh Ciamis). Ciamis Regency uses the Kingdom of Galuh symbol which inspired the club crest. PSGC Ciamis was established on 26 August 1990. PSGC A won the 1990 Galuh Cup title by beating Tasikmalaya in the final, among the teams from West Java (Tasikmalaya, Majalengka, Kuningan, and Cilacap from Central Java. The hosts included two of their teams, PSGC A and PSGC B. In 2026, Persib Bandung announced that PSGC would be their satellite team.

== Stadium ==
They play their home matches at the Galuh Stadium, with the capacity of 20,000 spectators.

== Coaching staff ==
As of October 2026

Position	Name
Head coach	(Indonesia) Herry Kiswanto
Assistant coach	(Indonesia) Dicky Adithia Nugraha (Indonesia) Arip Budiman (Indonesia) Iwan M. Darmawan
Physical coach	(Indonesia) M. Bagas Mahendra
Goalkeeper coach	(Indonesia) Engkus Kusparman
Physiotherapist	(Indonesia) Adi Nugraha (Indonesia) Robert Rohman
Kitman	(Indonesia) Yuyu Kadarisman (Indonesia) Nanang Sudaryanto

== Players ==
=== Current squad ===
As of October 2026

Note: Flags indicate national team as defined under FIFA eligibility rules; some limited exceptions apply. Players may hold more than one non-FIFA nationality.

No.	Pos.	Nation	Player
1	MF	IDN	Raufa Aghastya
5	MF	IDN	Iman Fathurahman
6	MF	IDN	Ahmad Baasith
7	MF	IDN	Ferdiansyah
8	MF	IDN	Darrell Ang
9	FW	IDN	Yandi Sofyan
10	FW	CHA	Ezechiel N'Douassel
11	MF	IDN	Aldi Imron Rosadi
12	FW	IDN	Ghani Fatir
14	MF	IDN	Ganjar Kurniawan (captain)
15	DF	IDN	Zikri Ferdiansyah
17	DF	IDN	Odilo Pinutusta
19	FW	IDN	Dennish Diaz
20	MF	IDN	Izmir Emirullah
21	DF	IDN	Faris Abdul Hafizh (on loan from Persib Bandung)
22	MF	IDN	Darel Valentino
23	GK	IDN	Adinda Suryatama
24	MF	IDN	Ichsan Kurniawan

No.	Pos.	Nation	Player
28	MF	IDN	Muhammad Rokhmat
29	DF	IDN	Kevin Pasha (on loan from Persib Bandung)
30	MF	IDN	Akmal Juanda
36	FW	IDN	Athaya Zahran (on loan from Persib Bandung)
46	MF	IDN	Kaka Depriadi
57	MF	CRC	Johan Bonilla
60	GK	IDN	Yofandani Pranata
46	MF	IDN	Alsidqi Raffa
66	DF	IDN	Surya Wardana
71	DF	IDN	Muhammad Fikram
77	DF	IDN	Fardan Harahap
78	DF	IDN	Gianda Fateh
82	DF	IDN	Alvin Kurniawan
91	MF	IDN	Bagus Cahaya
92	DF	KOR	Kim Min-hyeok

== Season-by-season records ==
Season(s)	League/Division	Tms.	Pos.	Piala Indonesia	I-League Cup
2007	Third Division			–	–
2008–09	Second Division			–	–
2009–10	Second Division	72	First round	–	–
2010–11	Second Division	78	Third round	–	–
2011–12	First Division (LPIS)	66	5th, Group 5	–	–
2013	First Division	77	2nd, Third round	–	–
2014	Premier Division	60	Semi-final	–	–
2015	Premier Division	55	did not finish	–	–
2016	Indonesia Soccer Championship B	53	4th, Second round	–	–
2017	Liga 2	61	2nd, Relegation round	–	–
2018	Liga 3	32	2nd, Third round	First round	–
2019	Liga 2	23	10th, West division	First round	–
2020	Liga 3	season abandoned		–	–
2021–22	Liga 3	64	3rd, Third round	–	–
2022–23	Liga 3	season abandoned		–	–
2023–24	Liga 3	80	3rd, Third round	–	–
2024–25	Liga Nusantara	16	4	–	–
2025–26	Liga Nusantara	24	3	–	–
2026–27	Championship	20	TBD	–	TBD
