= 2025 Liga 2 (Indonesia) final =

2025 Liga 2 final
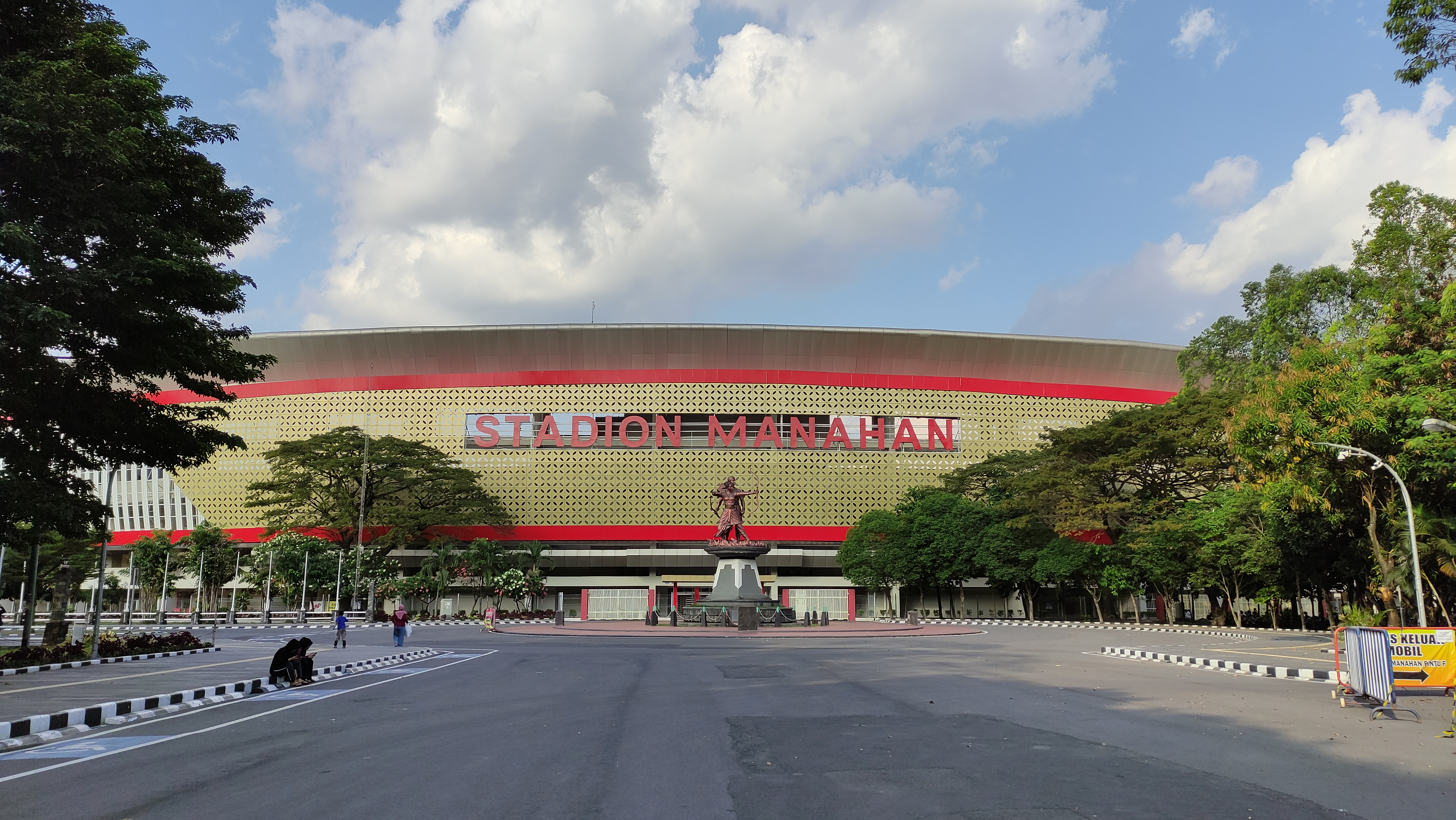
- The final match was held at Manahan Stadium
- Event: 2024–25 Liga 2
PSIM	Bhayangkara Presisi
2	1
- at extra time
- Date: 26 February 2025
- Venue: Manahan Stadium, Surakarta
- Referee: Rio Permana Putra
- Attendance: 15,586

The 2025 Liga 2 final was the final match of the 2024–25 Liga 2, the 15th season of second-tier competition in Indonesia organised by PT Liga Indonesia Baru, and the eighth season since it was renamed from the Liga Indonesia Premier Division to the Liga 2. It was held at the Manahan Stadium in Surakarta, Central Java on 26 February 2025.

== Background ==
=== PSIM ===
PSIM had never reached a Liga 2 final before. Their last second-tier final was in the 2005 Liga Indonesia First Division, where they won the title with a 2–1 victory over Persiwa.

=== Bhayangkara Presisi ===
Since the restructuring of the Premier Division into the second-tier, Bhayangkara Presisi has reached the final once, in the 2013 Liga Indonesia Premier Division final, where they won 2–0 against Perseru. At that time, they were still known as Persebaya DU.

=== Previous finals ===
Team	Previous final appearances (bold indicates winners)
PSIM	None
Bhayangkara Presisi	1 (**2013**)

== Route to the final ==
PSIM
Round
Bhayangkara Presisi
**Group 2** **runner-up**

Pos	Team	Pld	Pts
1	Bhayangkara Presisi	16	**33**
**2**	PSIM	**16**	**29**
3	Persijap	16	**28**
4	Adhyaksa	16	**25**
5	Nusantara United	16	**19**

Source: Liga 2 2024–25
Regular round
**Group 2** **winner**

Pos	Team	Pld	Pts
**1**	Bhayangkara Presisi	**16**	**33**
2	PSIM	16	**29**
3	Persijap	16	**28**
4	Adhyaksa	16	**25**
5	Nusantara United	16	**19**

Source: Liga 2 2024–25
**Group X** **winner**

Pos	Team	Pld	Pts
**1**	PSIM (C, P)	**6**	**15**
2	PSPS	6	**9**
3	Persiraja	6	**9**
4	Deltras	6	**3**

Source: Liga 2 2024–25
(C) Champions; (P) Promoted
Championship round
**Group Y** **winner**

Pos	Team	Pld	Pts
**1**	Bhayangkara Presisi (P)	**6**	**9**
2	Persijap (O, P)	6	**9**
3	PSKC	6	**8**
4	Persela	6	**4**

Source: Liga 2 2024–25
(O) Play-off winners; (P) Promoted

== Format ==
The final will be played as a single match. If tied after regulation time, extra time and, if necessary, a penalty shoot-out will be used to decide the winning team.

== Match ==
26 February 2025
15:00 UTC+7

PSIM	2–1 (a.e.t.)	Bhayangkara Presisi
Rafinha 9'; Roken 95'	Report	71' Ryan

Manahan Stadium, Surakarta
Attendance: 15,586
Referee: Rio Permana Putra

**PSIM**	**Bhayangkara Presisi**

GK	26	(Indonesia) Harlan Suardi
RB	6	(Indonesia) Sunni Hizbullah
CB	14	(Indonesia) Rendra Teddy (c)
CB	3	(Japan) Yusaku Yamadera
LB	29	(Indonesia) Rio Hardiawan
DM	21	(Indonesia) Adittia Gigis
CM	8	(Indonesia) Savio Sheva		(substituted off) 78'
AM	11	(Indonesia) Yudha Alkanza		(substituted off) HT'
RW	20	(Indonesia) Arlyansyah Abdulmanan		(substituted off) 78'
LW	27	(Indonesia) Sugiyanto Rohman		(substituted off) HT'
CF	91	(Brazil) Rafinha
Substitutions:
GK	25	(Indonesia) Riki Pambudi
CB	5	(Indonesia) Asyraq Gufron
AM	7	(Indonesia) Ghulam Fatkur		(substituted on) HT'
CM	10	(Islamic Republic of Afghanistan) Omid Popalzay		(substituted on) 78'
RB	13	(Indonesia) Muhammad Fariz
RW	18	(Indonesia) Saldi Amiruddin
LW	19	(Indonesia) Figo Dennis	(yellow card) 120+3'	(substituted on) 78'
LB	23	(Indonesia) Samuel Simanjuntak
LW	54	(Indonesia) Roken Tampubolon	(yellow card) 87'	(substituted on) HT'
CB	57	(Indonesia) Tegar Islami
LB	74	(Indonesia) Edgard Amping
CF	88	(Indonesia) Irvan Mofu
Manager:
(Indonesia) Erwan Hendarwanto

GK	12	(Indonesia) Awan Setho
RB	2	(Indonesia) Putu Gede		(substituted off) 96'
CB	3	(Brazil) Léo Silva	(yellow card) 56'
CB	28	(Indonesia) Arif Satria
LB	14	(Indonesia) Ruben Sanadi (c)
DM	19	(Indonesia) Teuku Ichsan		(substituted off) 96'
CM	8	(Indonesia) Muhammad Hargianto		(substituted off) 103'
AM	97	(Brazil) Felipe Ryan
RW	10	(Indonesia) Dendy Sulistyawan		(substituted off) 46'
LW	58	(Indonesia) Frengky Missa	(yellow card) 34'	(substituted off) 46'
CF	9	(Indonesia) Ilija Spasojević		(substituted off) 61'
Substitutions:
GK	1	(Indonesia) Aqil Savik
CB	4	(Indonesia) Erwin Gutawa
LB	5	(Indonesia) Muhammad Fatchu Rochman
CB	6	(Indonesia) Andy Setyo		(substituted on) 96'
LW	17	(Indonesia) Raheem Nugraha	(yellow card) 79'	(substituted on) 46'
DM	18	(Indonesia) Taufiq Febriyanto	(yellow card) 110'	(substituted on) 96'
AM	20	(Indonesia) Sani Rizki	(yellow card) 67'	(substituted on) 46'
AM	23	(Indonesia) Wahyu Subo Seto
CB	26	(Indonesia) Ferre Murari
RB	27	(Indonesia) Indra Kahfi
LW	81	(Indonesia) Mufdi Iskandar		(substituted on) 103'
CF	91	(Islamic Republic of Afghanistan) Fareed Sadat	(yellow card) 108'	(substituted on) 61'
Manager:
(Indonesia) Hanim Sugiarto

Man of the Match:
Roken Tampubolon (PSIM)

Assistant referees:
Beni Andriko
Umar
Fourth official:
Aidil Azmi
Video assistant referee:
Armyn Dwi Suryathin
Assistant video assistant referee:
Fuad Qohar

**Match rules**

- 90 minutes
- 30 minutes of extra time if tied after normal time
- Penalty shoot-out if still tied after extra time
- Ten named substitutes, of which up to five may be used, with a sixth allowed in extra time.

== See also ==
- 2024–25 Liga 2
