= Bagas Satrio =

Indonesian footballer

Personal information
- Full name: Bagas Satrio Nugroho
- Date of birth: 26 February 2001 (age 25)
- Place of birth: Kediri, Indonesia
- Height: 1.75 m (5 ft 9 in)
- Position: Midfielder

Youth career
- 2017–2019: SSB Triple S
- 2020–2021: Persedikab Kediri

Senior career*
Years	Team	Apps	(Gls)
2021–2024	Persik Kediri	2	(0)
2022	→ Persedikab Kediri (loan)	0	(0)
2023–2024	→ Nusantara United (loan)	15	(0)
2025	Persikas Subang	6	(0)
2025–2026	Sumsel United	0	(0)
- * Club domestic league appearances and goals as of 9 February 2025

Bagas Satrio Nugroho (born 26 February 2001) is an Indonesian professional footballer who plays as a midfielder.

== Club career ==
=== Persik Kediri ===
He was signed for Persik Kediri to play in Liga 1 in the 2021 season. Bagas made his first-team debut on 23 February 2022 as a substitute in a match against Persiraja Banda Aceh at the Ngurah Rai Stadium, Denpasar.

==== Loan to Persedikab Kediri ====
On 2022, Satrio signed with Liga 3 club Persedikab Kediri, on loan from Liga 1 club Persik Kediri.

== Career statistics ==
=== Club ===
As of 9 February 2025.

Club	Season	League			Cup		Continental		Other		Total	
Club	Season	Division	Apps	Goals	Apps	Goals	Apps	Goals	Apps	Goals	Apps	Goals
Persik Kediri	2021	Liga 1	1	0	0	0	–		0	0	1	0
Persik Kediri	2022–23	Liga 1	1	0	0	0	–		0	0	1	0
Persedikab Kediri (loan)	2022–23	Liga 3	0	0	0	0	–		0	0	0	0
Nusantara United (loan)	2023–24	Liga 2	15	0	0	0	–		0	0	15	0
Persikas Subang	2024–25	Liga 2	6	0	0	0	–		0	0	6	0
Sumsel United	2025–26	Championship	0	0	0	0	–		0	0	0	0
Career total			23	0	0	0	0	0	0	0	23	0
