= Supriyadi Eeng =

Indonesian footballer

Personal information
- Date of birth: 1 November 1993 (age 32)
- Place of birth: Malang, Indonesia
- Height: 1.75 m (5 ft 9 in)
- Position: Winger

Senior career*
Years	Team	Apps	(Gls)
2012–2017	Persekam Metro		
2017	Persatu Tuban		
2017–2018	PSIM Yogyakarta	21	(3)
2019	Badak Lampung	0	(0)
2019	Madura	15	(2)
2020	PSIM Yogyakarta	1	(0)
2021	Persiraja Banda Aceh	15	(0)
2022	PSS Sleman	5	(1)
2022–2024	PSCS Cilacap	18	(2)
2024	Persikas Subang	14	(1)
- * Club domestic league appearances and goals as of 15 December 2024

Supriyadi Eeng (born 1 November 1993) is an Indonesian professional footballer who plays as a winger.

== Playing career ==
=== Club ===
Supriyadi began his professional career at Persekam Metro F.C., where he played for six seasons before moving to Persatu Tuban. He joined PSIM Yogyakarta for two seasons before returning to the club again in 2020 following short spells at Badak Lampung and Madura. Supriyadi joined Persiraja Banda Aceh where he played in fifteen matches. He then transferred to PSS Sleman, where he scored a goal against his former club in his first appearance with his new team.

== Career statistics ==
As of match played 15 December 2024

Appearances and goals by club, season and competition
Club	Season	League			National Cup		League Cup		Continental		Other		Total	
Club	Season	Division	Apps	Goals	Apps	Goals	Apps	Goals	Apps	Goals	Apps	Goals	Apps	Goals
Persiraja Banda Aceh	2021–22	Liga 1	15	0	0	0	0	0	0	0	0	0	15	0
PSS Sleman	2021–22	Liga 1	5	1	0	0	0	0	0	0	0	0	5	1
PSCS Cilacap	2022–23	Liga 2	7	2	0	0	0	0	0	0	0	0	7	2
PSCS Cilacap	2023–24	Liga 2	11	0	0	0	0	0	0	0	0	0	11	0
Persikas Subang	2024–25	Liga 2	14	1	0	0	0	0	0	0	0	0	14	1
Career total			52	4	0	0	0	0	0	0	0	0	52	4
