= 2019 Lao FF Cup =

Tournament details
- Country: Laos
- Dates: 14 July – 28 September
- Teams: 13

Final positions
- Champions: Lao Toyota (1st title)
- Runners-up: Evo United

Tournament statistics
- Matches played: 13
- Goals scored: 25 (1.92 per match)
- Top goal scorer: 12

Awards
- Best player: Kazuo Homma

The 2019 Lao FF Cup is the second edition of the Lao FF Cup, the knockout football tournament in Laos. The tournament returns after last held in 2014. It is scheduled to start on 13 July 2019.

The draw of the tournament was held on 3 July 2019. A total of 14 teams compete in the tournament.

== First round ==
Matches played on 13–14 July 2019.

13 July: LAO TOYOTA FC 9-0 VIENGCHANH FC

13 July: POLICE FC 2-1 MASTER 7 FC

13 July: QUEST UNITED 1-1 VIENTIANE FT ( PK: 5-4 )

14 July: NUOL FC 0-1 EVO UNITED

14 July: VIENTIANE CAPITAL FC 0-0 BEARS LAO FA ( PK: 4-2 )

14 July: ARMY FC 0-3 YOUNG ELEPHANTS FC

Bye to quarter-finals: KPS FC, TRINITY FC

== Quarter-finals ==
Matches played on 10–11 August 2019.

10 August: TRINITY FC 2-8 EVO UNITED

11 August: POLICE FC 7-0 QUEST UNITED

11 August: YOUNG ELEPHANTS FC 2-0 VIENTIANE CAPITAL FC

21 August (postponed from 10 August): KPS FC 0-15 LAO TOYOTA FC

== Semi-finals ==
Matches played on 24 August 2019.

24 August: YOUNG ELEPHANTS FC 0-1 EVO UNITED

24 August: POLICE FC 0-2 LAO TOYOTA FC

== Final ==
Match played on 28 September 2019.

Lao Toyota 8-0 Evo United

== Brackets ==
First round
13 July
POLICE FC	2
MASTER 7 FC	1
13 July
QUEST UNITED	1(5)
VIENTIANE FT	1(4)
13 July
LAO TOYOTA FC	9
VIENGCHANH FC	0
14 July
ARMY FC	0
YOUNG ELEPHANTS FC	3
14 July
VIENTIANE CAPITAL FC	0(4)
BEARS LAO FA	0(2)
14 July
NUOL FC	0
EVO UNITED	1

Quarter-finals
11 August
POLICE FC	7
QUEST UNITED	0
21 August (postponed from 10 August)
KPS FC	0
LAO TOYOTA FC	15
11 August
YOUNG ELEPHANTS FC	2
VIENTIANE CAPITAL FC	0
10 August
TRINITY FC	2
EVO UNITED	8

Semi-finals
24 August
POLICE FC	0
LAO TOYOTA FC	2
24 August
YOUNG ELEPHANTS FC	0
EVO UNITED	1

Finals
28 September 2019
LAO TOYOTA FC	8
EVO UNITED	0

== See also ==
- 2019 Lao Premier League
