= 2019 Lao Premier League =

Lao Premier League
- Season: 2019
- Champions: Lao Toyota
- Relegated: Evo United
- AFC Cup: AFC Cup
- Matches: 15
- Goals: 45 (3 per match)
- Longest winless run: Lao Toyota
- Longest losing run: Lao Army
- All statistics correct as of 9 March 2019.

The 2019 Lao Premier League is the 30th season of the Lao Premier League. The season starts on 23 February 2019. It is played in triple round-robin format, with 15 total rounds.

== Teams ==
A total of 6 teams participated in the 2019 Lao League season, not promoted from the previous season of Lao Division 1 League. 6 teams withdrew from the league.

Locations of the 2019 Lao Premier League teams

=== Stadiums ===
Note: Table lists in alphabetical order.

Team	Stadium	Capacity
Evo United	New Laos National Stadium	25,000
Lao Army	New Laos National Stadium	25,000
Lao Police	New Laos National Stadium	25,000
Lao Toyota	New Laos National Stadium	25,000
Master 7	New Laos National Stadium	25,000
Young Elephants	New Laos National Stadium	25,000

=== Foreign players ===
Club	Player 1	Player 2	Player 3	Asian Player
Evo United	(Nigeria) Murphy Alabi Ebedi	(Cameroon) Koffi Ben David	(Nigeria) Omewiri Oliver Augustine	(South Korea) Lee Dook-yo
Lao Army	-	-	-	-
Lao Police	-	-	-	-
Lao Toyota	(Japan) Kazuo Homma	(Brazil) Rafinha	(Brazil) Victor Amaro	(Japan) Soma Otani
Master 7	(Ivory Coast) Any Ange Mikael Fabrice	(Japan) Koshuke Asano		(Japan) Shota Wada
Young Elephant	-	-	-	-

== League table ==
Pos	Team	Pld	W	D	L	GF	GA	GD	Pts	Qualification or relegation
1	Lao Toyota (C)	15	12	1	2	46	12	+34	37	Qualification for AFC Cup group stage
2	Master 7	15	9	2	4	37	26	+11	29	Qualification for AFC Cup play-off round (Note: Since league champions Lao Toyota were also Lao FF Cup winners, the league runners-up qualified for the AFC Cup play-off round.)
3	Young Elephants	15	8	4	3	35	12	+23	28	
4	Lao Police	15	4	3	8	22	33	−11	15	
5	Lao Army	15	2	4	9	15	35	−20	10	
6	Evo United	15	2	2	11	17	54	−37	8	

Source: Lao Premier League
Rules for classification: 1) Points; 2) Goal difference; 3) Goals scored.
(C) Champions

== Results ==
=== Round 1–10 ===
Home \ Away	ARM	EVO	MAS	POL	TOY	YOU
Lao Army	—					
Evo United	2–0	—	2–0		1–4	
Master 7			—		2–4	0–4
Lao Police	1–0	2–0	2–5	—		
Lao Toyota					—	
Young Elephants	1–1			1–0		—

Updated to match(es) played on 7 April 2019. Source: Lao Premier League
Legend: Blue = home team win; Yellow = draw; Red = away team win.

=== Round 11–15 ===
Home \ Away	ARM	EVO	MAS	POL	TOY	YOU
Lao Army	—					
Evo United		—				
Master 7			—			
Lao Police				—		
Lao Toyota					—	
Young Elephants						—

First match(es) will be played: 23 February 2019. Source: Lao Premier League
Legend: Blue = home team win; Yellow = draw; Red = away team win.

== Attendances ==
The average league attendance was 573.

#	Club	Average
1	Lao Toyota	1,073
2	Master	821
3	Young Elephants	652
4	Lao Police	438
5	Lao Army	267
6	Evo United	184
