= List of football clubs in Potsdam =

There are a number of football clubs based in Potsdam, the capital of Brandenburg in Germany, but the most successful team is the women's football club 1. FFC Turbine Potsdam.

The following teams are ranked according to the league they play in (updated for the 2012–13 season):

Bundesliga (I)

- none

2. Bundesliga (II)

- none

3. Liga (III)

- SV Babelsberg 03

Regionalliga Nord (IV)

- none

NOFV-Oberliga Nord (V)

- none

Brandenburg-Liga (VI)

- SV Babelsberg 03 II
- Werderaner FC Viktoria 1920

Brandenburger Landesliga (Nord) (VII)

- RSV Eintracht Teltow 1949

Brandenburger Landesliga (Süd) (VII)

- SG Michendorf

Brandenburger Landesklasse-Mitte (VIII)

- Fortuna Babelsberg
- FSV Babelsberg 74
- SV Babelsberg 03 III
- Potsdamer Kickers
- Teltower FV 1913

Kreisliga (Havelland-Mitte) (IX)

- Eintracht 90 Babelsberg
- Fortuna Babelsberg II
- SG Blau-Weiß Beelitz
- SG Bornim
- Caputher SV
- Potsdamer Kickers II
- SV Ruhlsdorf 1893
- SG Saarmund
- RSV Eintracht Teltow 1949 II
- Werderaner FC Viktoria 1920 II

1. Kreisklasse (Havelland-Mitte) (X)

- FSV Babelsberg 74 II
- SG Blau-Weiß Beelitz II
- SG Bornim II
- Eintracht Glindow
- SG Grün-Weiß Golm
- SG Rot-Weiß Groß Glienicke
- FSV Groß Kreutz
- SG Michendorf II
- FV Turbine Potsdam 55
- SG Saarmund II
- ESV Lok Seddin

2. Kreisklasse (Havelland-Mitte) (XI)

- Caputher SV II
- SV 1948 Ferch
- Eintracht Glindow II
- SG Grün-Weiß Golm II
- Juventas Crew Alpha
- SG Michendorf III
- Eintracht Potsdam West
- ESV Lokomotiv Potsdam
- Potsdamer Kickers III
- UFK Potsdam
- Teltower FV 1913 II
- Werderaner FC Viktoria 1920 III

3. Kreisklasse Staffel A (Havelland-Mitte) (XII)

- FSV Groß Kreutz II
- SG Paaren

3. Kreisklasse Staffel B (Havelland-Mitte) (XII)

- Eintracht 90 Babelsberg II
- Fortuna Babelsberg III
- FSV Babelsberg 74 III
- Juventas Crew Alpha II
- Potsdamer FC 73
- Eintracht Potsdam West II
- ESV Lokomotiv Potsdam II
- FV Turbine Potsdam 55 II
- Potsdamer Sport-Union 04
- USV Potsdam
- SV 05 Rehbrücke
- SV Ruhlsdorf 1893 II
- SG Saarmund III
- SG Schenkenhorst
- FC Blau-Weiß Stücken
- RSV Eintracht Teltow 1949 III
