= Muhammad Nadhiif =

Indonesian footballer

Nadhiif Firdaus
Personal information
- Full name: Muhammad Nadhiif Rizqi Firdaus
- Date of birth: 17 February 2001 (age 25)
- Place of birth: Bandung, Indonesia
- Height: 1.71 m (5 ft 7 in)
- Position: Central midfielder

Team information
- Current team: Sumsel United
- Number: 7

Youth career
- 2016: Bhayangkara
- 2017: Persib Bandung
- 2018: PS TIRA
- 2019–2020: PSS Sleman

Senior career*
Years	Team	Apps	(Gls)
2021	Persiraja Banda Aceh	10	(0)
2022–2023	Perserang Serang	8	(0)
2023–2024	ASIOP	2	(0)
2025–	Sumsel United	0	(0)
- * Club domestic league appearances and goals as of 13 December 2021

Muhammad Nadhiif Rizqi Firdaus (born 17 February 2001) is an Indonesian professional footballer who plays as a central midfielder for Championship club Sumsel United.

== Club career ==
=== Persiraja Banda Aceh ===
He was signed for Persiraja Banda Aceh to play in Liga 1 in the 2021 season. Nadhiif made his first-team debut on 24 September 2021 as a substitute in a match against Persipura Jayapura at the Si Jalak Harupat Stadium, Soreang.

== Career statistics ==
=== Club ===
As of 13 December 2021.

Club	Season	League			Cup		Continental		Other		Total	
Club	Season	Division	Apps	Goals	Apps	Goals	Apps	Goals	Apps	Goals	Apps	Goals
Persiraja Banda Aceh	2021	Liga 1	10	0	0	0	–		0	0	10	0
Perserang Serang	2022–23	Liga 2	8	0	0	0	–		0	0	8	0
ASIOP	2023–24	Liga 3	2	0	0	0	–		0	0	2	0
Sumsel United	2025–26	Championship	0	0	0	0	–		0	0	0	0
Career total			20	0	0	0	0	0	0	0	20	0
