= Sami El Anabi =

Belgian-Moroccan professional footballer

Personal information
- Full name: Sami El Anabi
- Date of birth: 21 June 2000 (age 26)
- Place of birth: Liège, Belgium
- Height: 1.90 m (6 ft 3 in)
- Position: Defender

Team information
- Current team: Atert Bissen
- Number: 3

Youth career
- Standard Liège
- Visé
- CS Sart Tilman
- RFC Huy
- Virton

Senior career*
Years	Team	Apps	(Gls)
2019–2020	Virton	30	(5)
2020–2021	Real Avilés	9	(0)
2021–2022	Cherno More	2	(0)
2022–2023	Spartak Varna	6	(0)
2022–2023	Wydad AC	1	(0)
2023–2024	→ AS Salé (loan)	12	(4)
2023–2024	Marsaxlokk	3	(0)
2024–2025	Nusantara United	13	(0)
2024–2025	Bekasi City	5	(0)
2025–	Atert Bissen	13	(0)

International career
2019–2021	Morocco U20	18	(2)
2021–2023	Morocco U23	22	(4)
- * Club domestic league appearances and goals as of 30 November 2025

Sami El Anabi (born 21 June 2000) is a Belgian-born Moroccan professional footballer who plays as a defender for Luxembourgian club Atert Bissen.

== Club career ==
=== R.E. Virton ===
El Anabi spent 3 years at Virton. His final season with Virton he was captain of the Virton under-21 Pro League Belgium team.

=== Real Avilès ===
El Anabi joined Real Avilès in January 2021. He made his league debut for the club on 28 February 2021 in a 1–3 away win against SD Lenense. He and his team were promoted from the 4th division to the 3rd division in Spain. El Anabi played a key role in the promotion.

=== Cherno More Varna ===
On 5 August 2021, El Anabi signed his first professional contract with Cherno More. He made his league debut for the club on 18 September 2021 in a league match against FC Lokomotiv 1929 Sofia. His team reaches the Bulgarian top 6 and qualifies for the European Conference League play-offs.

=== Spartak Varna ===
On 1 July 2022, El Anabi joined Cherno More Varna's rival FC Spartak Varna.

=== Wydad AC ===
On 19 January 2023, El Anabi realized one of his biggest dreams by signing for the great Moroccan and African club Wydad AC. With his team he participates in the 2023 Club World Cup. He is a finalist in the African Champions League and the Moroccan championship during the 2022-2023 season. He is loaned at the end of the season to Salé where he plays 12 matches for 4 goals and being the captain of the team.

=== Marsaxlokk ===
On 17 January, El Anabi joins Marsaxlokk Fc in the Maltese Premier League. he made his debut with his new team on February 3, 2024 during the 2–1 victory against Gudja United in championship. El Anabi and his team qualified for the Conference League playoffs by finishing 4th in the Maltese Premier League.

=== Nusantara United ===
On 30 August 2024, El Anabi officially signed a contract with Indonesian club Nusantara United. He was brought in during the initial transfer window of the 2024–25 Liga 2 season. El Anabi is the first player in the history of Nusantara United to have played the most consecutive matches without defeat (9 games).

=== Atert Bissen ===
On 2 July 2025, El Anabi signed an initial one year deal with Luxembourg National Division newcomers Atert Bissen. El Anabi helped Bissen win the 2025–26 National Division title.

== Career statistics ==
=== Club ===
As of 27 May 2022

Club performance			League		Cup		Continental		Other		Total	
Club	League	Season	Apps	Goals	Apps	Goals	Apps	Goals	Apps	Goals	Apps	Goals
Real Avilés	Tercera División	2020–21	9	0	0	0	–		–		9	0
Real Avilés	Total		9	0	0	0	0	0	0	0	9	0
Cherno More	First League	2021–22	1	0	1	0	–		–		2	0
Cherno More	Total		1	0	1	0	0	0	0	0	2	0
Spartak Varna	First League	2022–23	0	0	0	0	–		–		0	0
Spartak Varna	Total		0	0	0	0	0	0	0	0	0	0
Career statistics			10	0	1	0	0	0	0	0	11	0
