= Andreas Ado =

Indonesian footballer

Personal information
- Full name: Andreas Chrismanto Ado
- Date of birth: 15 March 1997 (age 29)
- Place of birth: Jakarta, Indonesia
- Height: 1.74 m (5 ft 9 in)
- Position: Winger

Team information
- Current team: Sumsel United
- Number: 7

Youth career
- 2013–2015: Diklat Ragunan
- 2015–2016: PPLM DKI Jakarta

Senior career*
Years	Team	Apps	(Gls)
2017	PS Bengkulu	7	(4)
2018–2019	Persiwa Wamena	10	(2)
2019–2023	PSIS Semarang	28	(1)
2023–2024	Malut United	1	(1)
2024–2026	Adhyaksa	24	(3)
2026–	Sumsel United	1	(0)
- * Club domestic league appearances and goals as of 13 September 2026

Andreas Chrismanto Ado (born 15 March 1997) is an Indonesian professional footballer who plays as a winger for Championship club Sumsel United.

== Club career ==
=== PS Bengkulu ===
He was signed for PS Bengkulu to play in Liga 2 in the 2017 season. He made 7 league appearances and scored 4 goals for PS Bengkulu.

=== Persiwa Wamena ===
In 2018, Andreas Ado signed a one-year contract with Indonesian Liga 2 club Persiwa Wamena. He made 10 league appearances and scored 2 goals for Persiwa Wamena.

=== PSIS Semarang ===
He was signed for PSIS Semarang to play in Liga 1. Ado made his debut on 18 October 2019 in a match against Persela Lamongan. On 15 October 2021, Ado scored his first goal for PSIS against Persik Kediri in the 21st minute at the Manahan Stadium, Surakarta.

== Career statistics ==
=== Club ===
As of 13 September 2026

Club	Season	League			Cup		Continental		Other		Total	
Club	Season	Division	Apps	Goals	Apps	Goals	Apps	Goals	Apps	Goals	Apps	Goals
PS Bengkulu	2017	Liga 2	7	4	0	0	–		0	0	7	4
Persiwa Wamena	2018	Liga 2	10	2	0	0	–		0	0	10	2
Persiwa Wamena	Total		17	6	0	0	0	0	0	0	17	6
PSIS Semarang	2019	Liga 1	6	0	0	0	–		0	0	6	0
PSIS Semarang	2020	Liga 1	0	0	0	0	–		0	0	0	0
PSIS Semarang	2021–22	Liga 1	12	1	0	0	–		3 (Note: Appearances in Menpora Cup.)	0	15	1
PSIS Semarang	2022–23	Liga 1	10	0	0	0	–		3 (Note: Appearances in Indonesia President's Cup.)	0	13	0
PSIS Semarang	Total		28	1	0	0	0	0	6	0	34	1
Malut United	2023–24	Liga 2	1	1	0	0	–		0	0	1	1
Adhyaksa	2024–25	Liga 2	17	2	0	0	–		0	0	17	2
Adhyaksa	2025–26	Championship	7	1	0	0	–		0	0	7	1
Sumsel United	2026–27	Championship	1	0	0	0	–		0	0	1	0
Career total			71	11	0	0	0	0	6	0	77	11

== Honours ==
Malut United

- Liga 2 third place (play-offs): 2023–24
