= Léo Silva (footballer, born 2000) =

Brazilian footballer

Personal information
- Full name: Vinicius Leonardo da Silva
- Date of birth: 22 April 2000 (age 26)
- Place of birth: Paraná, Brazil
- Height: 1.86 m (6 ft 1 in)
- Position: Centre-back

Senior career*
Years	Team	Apps	(Gls)
2019–2022	Ponte Preta	2	(0)
2021	→ Inter de Limeira (loan)	7	(0)
2022	Ferroviária	13	(0)
2022–2023	São Bento	11	(0)
2023	Sampaio Corrêa	6	(0)
2023–2024	Ararat-Armenia	25	(1)
2024–2026	Bhayangkara	35	(1)
- * Club domestic league appearances and goals as of 22 April 2026

Vinicius Leonardo da Silva (born 22 April 2000), commonly known as Léo Silva, is a Brazilian professional footballer who plays as a centre-back.

== Club career ==
Born in Paraná, Brazil, Léo started off career in the Brazilian club Ponte Preta. He came to Inter de Limeira in 2021, and signed on loan. He made his club debut on 1 March 2021, starting in a 1–0 away lose against Ferroviária in the 2021 Campeonato Paulista.

On 13 April 2022, he joined Ferroviária of Série D.

On 22 November 2022, he joined São Bento on a free transfer. Four months later, Léo signed a contract with Sampaio Corrêa for the 2023 campaign.

=== Ararat-Armenia ===
In July 2023, he decided to go abroad for the first time to Armenia with joined Armenian Premier League side Ararat-Armenia for 2023–24 season. He made his league debut for the club on 30 July 2023 as a starter in a 3–1 away win over Ararat Yerevan. On 11 November 2023, he scored his first league goal for Ararat-Armenia in a 2–0 home win over Shirak.

=== Bhayangkara ===
Ahead of the 2024–25 season, he decided to Asia and joined Indonesian Liga 2 club Bhayangkara. He made his league debut for the club on 3 October 2024 as a starter in a 1–4 away win over Persekat Tegal.

On 7 February 2025, he scored his first league goal for Bhayangkara in a 2–2 draw over Persela Lamongan in a promotion play-off match. He played with the club all the way to the final of the competition, unfortunately losing to PSIM Yogyakarta and finishing as runners-up, ensuring promotion to Liga 1 next season.

== Honours ==
Ararat-Armenia

- Armenian Cup: 2023–24
