= Yusaku Yamadera =

Japanese footballer

Personal information
- Full name: Yusaku Yamadera
- Date of birth: 4 August 1997 (age 29)
- Place of birth: Nagano, Nagano, Japan
- Height: 1.82 m (6 ft 0 in)
- Position: Centre-back

Team information
- Current team: PSIM Yogyakarta
- Number: 3

Youth career
- –2015: Matsumoto Yamaga
- 2015–2019: Nippon Sport Science University

Senior career*
Years	Team	Apps	(Gls)
2019–2020	Pathumthani University		
2021	Tokyo United	1	(0)
2021–2022	Pathumthani University		
2021	→ Siam (loan)		
2022–2023	Ranong United	31	(2)
2023–2024	Nusantara United	17	(2)
2024–	PSIM Yogyakarta	51	(1)
- * Club domestic league appearances and goals as of 22 May 2026

Yusaku Yamadera (山寺 優作, Yamadera Yusaku; born 4 August 1997) is a Japanese professional footballer who plays as a centre-back for Super League club PSIM Yogyakarta.

In August 2023, Yamadera signed a contract with Indonesian club, Nusantara United. In July 2024, he officially signed a contract with the club PSIM Yogyakarta to plays in 2024–25 Liga 2 season.

== Career statistics ==
=== Club ===
As of 22 May 2026.

Club	Season	League			Cup		Continental		Other		Total	
Club	Season	Division	Apps	Goals	Apps	Goals	Apps	Goals	Apps	Goals	Apps	Goals
Ranong United	2022–23	Thai League 2	31	2	0	0	–		0	0	31	2
Nusantara United	2023–24	Liga 2	17	2	0	0	–		0	0	17	2
PSIM Yogyakarta	2024–25	Liga 2	23	1	0	0	–		0	0	23	1
PSIM Yogyakarta	2025–26	Super League	28	0	0	0	–		0	0	28	0
Career total			99	5	0	0	0	0	0	0	99	5
