= Drey Panyalay =

Indonesian footballer (born 2000)

Personal information
- Full name: Drey Buyung Panyalay
- Date of birth: 23 February 2000 (age 26)
- Place of birth: Karawang, Indonesia
- Height: 1.80 m (5 ft 11 in)
- Position: Forward • left winger

Team information
- Current team: Persikotas Nusantara
- Number: 21

Youth career
- 2012: Camenpora Indonesia
- 2019: Persija Jakarta U19

Senior career*
| Years | Team | Apps | (Gls) |
| 2019 | Madura United | 0 | (0) |
| 2021 | Persewangi Banyuwangi | | |
| 2021–2022 | Persipal Palu | 0 | (0) |
| 2022–2025 | Semen Padang | 13 | (0) |
| 2025–2026 | Nusantara Lampung | 9 | (0) |
| 2026– | Persikotas Nusantara | 0 | (0) |

International career
| 2012 | Indonesia U14 | | |
| 2014 | Indonesia U16 | | |
- * Club domestic league appearances and goals as of 23 August 2026

Drey Buyung Panyalay (born 23 February 2000) is an Indonesian professional footballer who plays as a forward or left winger for Liga Nusantara club Persikotas Nusantara.

== Early career ==
Panyalay began his football journey with Camenpora Indonesia, where he showcased his goalscoring instincts abroad. During his time with the youth setup, he scored 7 goals in the Mediterranean International Cup and became the top scorer at the Barcelona Champion Cup after netting 10 goals. In 2019, he joined the Persija Jakarta U19 squad and emerged as the top scorer for the team during the Elite Pro Academy Liga 1 U19 tournament.

== Club career ==
Panyalay started his senior career by joining Madura United during the 2019 Liga 1 season. He later had short stints with Persewangi Banyuwangi and Persipal Palu before signing with Semen Padang on 12 June 2022 to strengthen their squad for the Liga 2 campaign. He expressed that joining the club was a proud moment as a dedication to his parents' hometown in West Sumatra. In 2025, he moved to Nusantara Lampung to compete in the Liga Nusantara competition, where he managed to clear 9 appearances during the 2025–26 season.

== International career ==
Panyalay was called up to the Indonesia under-14 team in 2012. Two years later, in 2014, he received another international call-up to represent the Indonesia under-16 team in regional youth training camps and competitions.
