= Persikas Subang =

Indonesian football club

- Full name: Perserikatan Sepakbola Indonesia Subang
- Nicknames: Singa Subang (Subang Lions)
- Short name: SUB
- Founded: 1951; 75 years ago
- Ground: Persikas Stadium; Subang, West Java
- Capacity: 5,000
- Chairman: Ahmad Buhori
- Manager: H. Oom Abdurohman
- Coach: Mial Armand
- League: None
- 2024–25: Liga 2, 1st in Relegation round Group K
- Website: https://subang.go.id/
Home colours	Away colours

Perserikatan Sepakbola Indonesia Subang, commonly known as Persikas, is an Indonesian football team based in Subang Regency, West Java. They last competed in the Liga 2.

== History ==
For the first time in the club's history, Persikas Subang officially recruited the first foreign player during the club's existence. The first foreign player to join was Yevhen Bokhashvili from Ukraine. He joined to strengthen the team in 2024–25 Liga 2 season.

Due to financial issues, Persikas sold their playing license in the Liga 2 to South Sumatra vice-governor Cik Ujang on 4 June 2025, who went on to establish Sumsel United that took over Persikas' spot in the league, a move that was ratified by the PSSI on 6 June 2025. However, despite withdrawing from the Liga 2, Persikas did not go defunct and instead set plans to start over from the lower leagues in the near future.

== Stadium ==
Persikas homebase called Persikas Stadium which has a capacity of 5,000 seats. This stadium is located on Jl. Pulau Bali No. 1, Pasirkareumbi, Subang.

== Players ==
As of 4 January 2025

Note: Flags indicate national team as defined under FIFA eligibility rules; some limited exceptions apply. Players may hold more than one non-FIFA nationality.

No.	Pos.	Nation	Player
1	GK	IDN	Rahmat Hidayat
2	DF	IDN	Krisna Prastiyo
3	DF	IDN	Dede Juandi
4	DF	IDN	Razan Akbar (on loan from Nusantara United)
5	DF	IDN	Bintang Arrahim
6	MF	IDN	Bagas Satrio
7	MF	BRA	Guilherme Batata
8	MF	IDN	Tito Tohpati
9	MF	IDN	Ega Nugraha
10	MF	IDN	Rudi Hidayat
11	MF	IDN	Fadil Redian
13	FW	IDN	Afdal Yusra
15	DF	IDN	Fajar Zainul
17	MF	IDN	Henry Rivaldy
18	FW	IDN	Dona Saputra
19	DF	IDN	Sulaiman Umar

No.	Pos.	Nation	Player
20	GK	IDN	Nurdin Rijki Nugraha
21	DF	IDN	Hendri Gunawan
22	MF	IDN	Muhammad Ridwan
23	DF	BRA	Pedrão
30	GK	IDN	Jandia Eka Putra (captain)
32	DF	IDN	Vieri Ariyanto
33	FW	IDN	Fardhan Faris
45	FW	IDN	Usman Diarra
48	MF	IDN	Yoga Pratama
55	MF	IDN	Takwir Rahman
63	MF	IDN	Firman Mutalib
64	MF	IDN	Deden Agus
66	DF	IDN	Angga Sukmantoro
73	DF	IDN	Julyano Pratama
92	MF	TLS	Thiago Fernandes

== Supporters ==
Persikas Subang has a supporter group that is spread throughout the Subang Regency, considering its historical record as the only club in the regency. Persikas fans call themselves Super Sub (Supporter Persikas Subang).

After creating a new history of Persikas qualifying for Liga 2 in 2024, the people of Subang who are members of the supporters' community and ordinary people welcomed this team's return to their area. Where they escorted him from the Cilameri toll gate until the convoy headed to Subang Regency square. This was the biggest atmosphere they had ever celebrated.

== Rivalries ==
Purwasuka derbies is a football match between Persipo Purwakarta, Persikas Subang, and Persika Karawang. The name is taken from the history that connects the three regencies in earlier times together. Historically, Subang and Purwakarta was a part of Karawang Residency. So when the teams from each city it always creates quite high tension in the game, because historically the relationship is very close both in terms of culture and politics, but the tension is not as high as the Pasundan derby bring together Persib Bandung against Persikabo 1973 or the Persib–Persija rivalry.

Derbies matches are always happening at the lower-level football Indonesia, precisely in Second Division and Third Division, as Persikas against Persipo and Persikas against Persika. All the games that bring together teams from Region IV proved to be effective in attracting the audience to the stadium, because the game is running with derbies and is considered to have great prestige and high tension.

== Coaches ==
- (Indonesia) Didin Gultom (2023–2024)
- (Indonesia) Mial Armand (2024–2025)

== Season-by-season records ==
Season(s)	League/Division	Teams	Pos.	Piala Indonesia	AFC competition(s)
2016	ISC Liga Nusantara			—	—
2017	Liga 3	32	eliminated in provincial round	—	—
2018	Liga 3	32	withdrew from provincial round	—	—
2019	Liga 3	32	eliminated in provincial round	—	—
2020	Liga 3	season abandoned		—	—
2021–22	Liga 3	64	eliminated in provincial round	—	—
2022–23	Liga 3	season abandoned		—	—
2023–24	Liga 3	80	3rd, fourth round	—	—
2024–25	Liga 2	26	1st, relegation round	—	—

== Honours ==
=== Senior ===
- Jabar Djarum Super Cup
  - Winner: 1989
- Liga 3 West Java Series 1
  - Runners-up: 2023
- Liga 3 West Java Series 2
  - Runners-up: 2021

=== Junior ===
- U-17 Soeratin Cup West Java
  - Runners-up: 1992
- U-15 Soeratin Cup West Java
  - Runners-up: 2009
  - Third-place: 2008
