= Takwir Rahman =

Indonesian footballer

Personal information
- Full name: Takwir Rahman
- Date of birth: 1 January 1999 (age 27)
- Place of birth: Kendari, Indonesia
- Height: 1.72 m (5 ft 8 in)
- Position: Midfielder

Youth career
- SSB Galasiswa
- 2018–2019: PSM Makassar

Senior career*
Years	Team	Apps	(Gls)
2019–2020	PSM Makassar	4	(0)
2020	→ Kalteng Putra (loan)	1	(0)
2021	Kalteng Putra	9	(1)
2022–2023	Persela Lamongan	9	(0)
2023–2024	PSPS Riau	11	(0)
2025	Persikas Subang	7	(0)
2025–2026	Persipal Palu	11	(0)
- * Club domestic league appearances and goals as of 3 January 2026

Takwir Rahman (born 1 January 1999) is an Indonesian professional footballer who plays as a midfielder.

== Honours ==
=== Clubs ===
PSM Makassar

- Piala Indonesia: 2019
