= Dodi Irawan =

Indonesian footballer

Personal information
- Full name: Dodi Irawan
- Date of birth: 7 May 2003 (age 23)
- Place of birth: Bandar Lampung, Indonesia
- Height: 1.79 m (5 ft 10 in)
- Position: Centre-back

Team information
- Current team: Persikotas Nusantara
- Number: 4

Youth career
- 2017–2018: PPLP Musi Banyuasin
- 2019: Badak Lampung
- 2019–2020: Garuda Select
- 2021: Bhayangkara

Senior career*
Years	Team	Apps	(Gls)
2022–2023	Bhayangkara	2	(0)
2022	→ PSMS Medan (loan)	1	(0)
2024–2025	Perserang Serang	0	(0)
2025–2026	Nusantara Lampung	7	(0)
2026–	Persikotas Nusantara	0	(0)
- * Club domestic league appearances and goals as of 30 December 2025

Dodi Irawan (born 7 May 2003) is an Indonesian professional footballer who plays as a centre-back for Liga Nusantara club Persikotas Nusantara.

== Club career ==
=== Bhayangkara ===
He was signed for Bhayangkara to play in Liga 1 in the 2021 season. Dodi made his professional debut on 20 March 2022 in a match against Persela Lamongan at the Kapten I Wayan Dipta Stadium, Gianyar.

==== Loan to PSMS Medan ====
On 2022, Dodi Irawan signed with Liga 2 club PSMS Medan, on loan from Liga 1 club Bhayangkara. He made 1 league appearance for PSMS Medan in the 2022-23 Liga 2 (Indonesia).

== Career statistics ==
=== Club ===
As of 30 December 2025.

Club	Season	League			Cup		Other		Total	
Club	Season	Division	Apps	Goals	Apps	Goals	Apps	Goals	Apps	Goals
Bhayangkara	2021–22	Liga 1	2	0	0	0	0	0	2	0
Bhayangkara	2022–23	Liga 1	0	0	0	0	0	0	0	0
PSMS Medan (loan)	2022–23	Liga 2	1	0	0	0	0	0	1	0
Perserang Serang	2024–25	Liga Nusantara	0	0	0	0	0	0	0	0
Nusantara Lampung	2025–26	Liga Nusantara	7	0	0	0	0	0	7	0
Career total			10	0	0	0	0	0	10	0
