= Rafael Conrado =

Brazilian footballer

Personal information
- Full name: Rafael Conrado Prudente
- Date of birth: 14 January 1995 (age 31)
- Place of birth: Uberlândia, Brazil
- Height: 1.89 m (6 ft 2 in)
- Position: Forward

Team information
- Current team: Nadur Youngster
- Number: 9

Youth career
- 2015–2016: Campinas
- 2016–2017: Goianésia

Senior career*
Years	Team	Apps	(Gls)
2015–2017	Stahl Brandenburg	48	(27)
2017–2019	Werderaner FC Viktoria 1920	51	(35)
2019–2021	MSV Neuruppin	15	(15)
2021–2022	Fgura United	19	(12)
2022–2023	Qala Saints	19	(14)
2023	Persikabo 1973	7	(1)
2024	Oratory Youths	11	(8)
2024	Adhyaksa	3	(0)
2025	Rio Branco	0	(0)
2025–	Nadur Youngster	8	(10)
- * Club domestic league appearances and goals as of 12 April 2025

Rafael Conrado Prudente (born 14 January 1995) is a Brazilian professional footballer who plays as a forward for Gozo Football League First Division club Nadur Youngster.

== Club career ==
Born in Uberlândia, Brazil, at a young age, he has played abroad and joined several local Germany clubs, and finally decided to go to another country. He went to Malta and joined the Maltese Challenge League club Fgura United in the 2021 season.

In 2022–23 season, Conrado signed with Qala Saints. Conrado won the BOV GFA Player of the Month awards for September 2022 and October 2022 respectively, joined the Saints at the beginning of the season from Fgura United is a scorer who also distinguishes himself with the leadership and confidence he inspires in his team-mates in difficult phases during the games. He has also featured this season in Malta with Qala Saints. In all matches, he made 26 appearances and scored total 19 goals.

=== Persikabo 1973 ===
On 5 July 2023, Conrado signed a contract with Indonesian club Persikabo 1973. He made his league debut for the club in a 0–0 draw against Persija Jakarta on 9 July 2023. On 13 August 2023, he scored his first league goal of for the club, scoring in a 3–2 away lose over Borneo Samarinda at the Segiri Stadium.
