= Serdy Ephyfano =

Indonesian footballer (born 2002)

Personal information
- Full name: Serdy Ephyfano Rocky Sipolo
- Date of birth: 29 December 2002 (age 23)
- Place of birth: Jailolo, Indonesia
- Height: 1.80 m (5 ft 11 in)
- Position: Forward

Team information
- Current team: Persikotas Nusantara
- Number: 9

Youth career
- 2018–2019: PPLP Maluku Utara

Senior career*
Years	Team	Apps	(Gls)
2020	Bhayangkara	0	(0)
2021	Semen Padang	8	(2)
2022–2023	Borneo	6	(0)
2022	→ PSIM Yogyakarta (loan)	1	(0)
2022	→ Karo United (loan)	2	(0)
2023	PSPS Riau	4	(0)
2024–2025	Perserang Serang	9	(2)
2025–2026	Nusantara Lampung	9	(0)
2026–	Persikotas Nusantara	0	(0)

International career
2019	Indonesia U19	1	(0)
- * Club domestic league appearances and goals as of 11 January 2026

Serdy Ephyfano Rocky Sipolo (born 29 December 2002) is an Indonesian professional footballer who plays as a forward for Liga Nusantara club Persikotas Nusantara.

== Club career ==
=== Bhayangkara ===
Rocky signed with Bhayangkara to play in the Indonesian Liga 2 for the 2020 season. This season was suspended on 27 March 2020 due to the COVID-19 pandemic. The season was abandoned and was declared void on 20 January 2021.

=== Semen Padang ===
In 2021, Rocky signed a contract with Indonesian Liga 2 club Semen Padang. He made his league debut on 11 October 2021 in a match against Sriwijaya at the Gelora Sriwijaya Stadium, Palembang. He also scored his first goal for the team in 39th minute.

=== Borneo ===
Rocky signed with Borneo to play in the Indonesian Liga 1 for the 2021 season. He made his professional debut on 16 February 2022 in a match against Bhayangkara at the Kapten I Wayan Dipta Stadium, Gianyar.

== International career ==
In November 2019, Rocky was called up to the Indonesia U19 for 2020 AFC U-19 Championship qualification in Indonesia. On 10 November 2019, he debuted in a youth national team when he coming as a starting in a 1–1 draw against North Korea U19 in the 2020 AFC U-19 Championship qualification.

== Career statistics ==
=== Club ===
As of 11 January 2026

Club	Season	League			Cup		Continental		Other		Total	
Club	Season	Division	Apps	Goals	Apps	Goals	Apps	Goals	Apps	Goals	Apps	Goals
Bhayangkara	2020	Liga 1	0	0	0	0	–		0	0	0	0
Semen Padang	2021	Liga 2	8	2	0	0	–		0	0	8	2
Borneo	2021	Liga 1	6	0	0	0	–		0	0	6	0
Borneo	2022–23	Liga 1	0	0	0	0	–		0	0	0	0
PSIM Yogyakarta (loan)	2022–23	Liga 2	1	0	0	0	–		0	0	1	0
Karo United (loan)	2022–23	Liga 2	2	0	0	0	–		0	0	2	0
PSPS Riau	2023–24	Liga 2	4	0	0	0	–		0	0	4	0
Perserang Serang	2024–25	Liga Nusantara	9	2	0	0	–		0	0	9	2
Nusantara Lampung	2025–26	Liga Nusantara	9	0	0	0	–		0	0	9	0
Career total			39	4	0	0	0	0	0	0	39	4
