= Ronny Maza =

Venezuelan footballer (born 1997)

Personal information
- Full name: Ronny Jesús Maza Miranda
- Date of birth: 11 May 1997 (age 29)
- Place of birth: Maracaibo, Venezuela
- Height: 1.82 m (6 ft 0 in)
- Position: Forward

Team information
- Current team: Aragua

Senior career*
Years	Team	Apps	(Gls)
2016–2018	Zulia	15	(3)
2016	→ Portuguesa (loan)	10	(1)
2018–2020	Trujillanos	53	(13)
2021	Valour	0	(0)
2021–2022	Portuguesa	16	(1)
2023–2024	Angostura	45	(9)
2024	Persiku Kudus	12	(2)
2025	RANS Nusantara	8	(0)
2025–2026	Mineros de Guayana	21	(1)
2026–	Aragua	1	(0)
- * Club domestic league appearances and goals as of 9 March 2026

Ronny Jesús Maza Miranda (born 11 May 1997) is a Venezuelan professional footballer who plays as a forward for Venezuelan Segunda División club Aragua.

== Early life ==
Maza was born in the city of Maracaibo in Venezuela's Zulia state.

== Club career ==
=== Zulia ===
Maza began his career with Venezuelan Primera División side Zulia, and made his professional debut in 2016 while on loan with Portuguesa. During his loan, he made a total of ten appearances in league play, scoring one goal, and also scored a goal in the Copa Venezuela.

Maza made his debut for Zulia the following season in a 2–2 draw against Deportivo Lara. On 28 April 2017, he made his continental debut in the Copa Libertadores in a 1–1 draw against Argentine side Lanús. That season, he scored three goals in twelve league appearances and made another two appearances in the Copa Venezuela. In 2018, Maza made three league appearances for Zulia before departing mid-season.

=== Trujillanos ===
In July 2018, Maza signed with nearby Primera División side Trujillanos and made seven league appearances, scoring one goal, and appeared in both of the club's playoff matches that year. The following season, Maza achieved career-highs in both goals and appearances, scoring nine in 29 appearances. He also made two appearances in the playoffs and one in the Copa Venezuela that year. In 2020, Maza scored three goals in seventeen appearances in a season shortened by the COVID-19 pandemic.

=== Valour FC ===
On 7 January 2021, Maza signed with Canadian Premier League side Valour FC.

== Career statistics ==
As of 25 February 2025

Club statistics
Club	Season	League			National Cup (Note: Includes appearances in the Copa Venezuela.)		Continental (Note: Includes appearances in Copa Libertadores.)		Other (Note: Includes appearances in the Venezuelan Primera División playoffs.)		Total	
Club	Season	Division	Apps	Goals	Apps	Goals	Apps	Goals	Apps	Goals	Apps	Goals
Portuguesa (loan)	2016	Venezuelan Primera División	10	1	1	1	—		0	0	11	2
Zulia	2017	Venezuelan Primera División	12	3	2	0	1	0	0	0	15	3
Zulia	2018	Venezuelan Primera División	3	0	0	0	—		0	0	3	0
Zulia	Total		15	3	2	0	1	0	0	0	18	3
Trujillanos	2018	Venezuelan Primera División	7	1	0	0	—		2	0	9	1
Trujillanos	2019	Venezuelan Primera División	29	9	1	0	—		2	0	32	9
Trujillanos	2020	Venezuelan Primera División	17	3	0	0	—		0	0	17	3
Trujillanos	Total		53	13	1	0	0	0	4	0	58	13
Valour FC	2021	Canadian Premier League	0	0	0	0	—		0	0	0	0
Portuguesa	2021	Venezuelan Primera División	16	1	0	0	—		0	0	16	1
Angostura	2023	Venezuelan Primera División	26	5	0	0	—		0	0	26	5
Angostura	2021	Venezuelan Primera División	19	4	2	0	—		0	0	21	4
Angostura	Total		45	9	2	0	0	0	0	0	47	9
Persiku Kudus	2024–25	Liga 2	12	2	0	0	—		0	0	12	2
RANS Nusantara	2024–25	Liga 2	8	0	0	0	—		0	0	8	0
Career total			143	29	6	1	1	0	4	0	154	30
