= Riki Pambudi =

Indonesian association footballer

Personal information
- Full name: Riki Pambudi
- Date of birth: 24 December 1995 (age 30)
- Place of birth: Kutai Kartanegara, Indonesia
- Height: 1.80 m (5 ft 11 in)
- Position: Goalkeeper

Team information
- Current team: Barito Putera

Youth career
- 2013–2014: Mitra Kukar

Senior career*
Years	Team	Apps	(Gls)
2014–2017	Mitra Kukar	5	(0)
2017–2019	Kalteng Putra	26	(0)
2019	→ Persiba Balikpapan (loan)	10	(0)
2020–2024	Persiba Balikpapan	27	(0)
2024–2025	PSIM Yogyakarta	1	(0)
2026	Persiku Kudus	11	(0)
2026–	Barito Putera	0	(0)
- * Club domestic league appearances and goals as of 3 May 2026

Riki Pambudi (born 24 December 1995) is an Indonesian professional footballer who plays as a goalkeeper for Championship club Barito Putera.

== Honours ==
=== Club ===
Kalteng Putra

- Liga 2 third place (play-offs): 2018

PSIM Yogyakarta

- Liga 2: 2024–25
