= 2024–25 Liga 2 (Indonesia) =

Liga 2
- Season: 2024–25
- Dates: 7 September 2024 – 28 February 2025
- Champions: PSIM (1st Liga 2 title, 2nd second-tier title)
- Promoted: PSIM; Bhayangkara Presisi; Persijap
- Relegated: Dejan; Gresik United; Nusantara United; Persewar; Persibo; Persikabo 1973; Persikota; Persipa; RANS Nusantara
- Matches: 291
- Goals: 740 (2.54 per match)
- Best player: Rafinha
- Top goalscorer: Ramai Rumakiek (22 goals)
- Biggest home win: Persipura 8–0 RANS Nusantara (21 February 2025)
- Biggest away win: Persiku 0–5 PSIM (20 October 2024)
- Highest scoring: Persikota 4–6 PSPS (25 September 2024)
- Longest winning run: 5 matches Bhayangkara Presisi; Persibo; PSMS
- Longest unbeaten run: 16 matches Bhayangkara Presisi
- Longest winless run: 17 matches Persikabo 1973
- Longest losing run: 9 matches Persikas
- Highest attendance: 15,835; PSPS 1–0 Persiraja (11 February 2025)
- Lowest attendance: 50; Persikabo 1973 0–4 PSMS (1 December 2024); RANS Nusantara 0–3 Persela (14 December 2024) (excluding matches played behind closed doors)
- Total attendance: 705,952
- Average attendance: 2,426

The 2024–25 Liga 2 (also known as the 2024–25 Pegadaian Liga 2 for sponsorship reasons) was the eighth season of the Liga 2 under its current name and the 15th season under its current league structure. The league format was announced on 25 July 2024. The season started on 7 September 2024.

== Teams ==
26 teams competed in the league – the seventeen teams from the previous season, three teams relegated from the Liga 1 and six teams promoted from Liga 3.

=== Team changes ===
The following teams changed division after the 2023–24 season.

To Liga 2
▼ Relegated from Liga 1
- RANS Nusantara
- Bhayangkara Presisi
- Persikabo 1973
▲ Promoted from Liga 3
- Adhyaksa
- Dejan
- Persibo
- Persikas
- Persikota
- Persiku

From Liga 2
▲ Promoted to Liga 1
- PSBS
- Semen Padang
- Malut United
▼ Relegated to Liga 3
- Kalteng Putra
- Perserang
- Persiba
- Persikab
- PSCS
- PSDS
- Sada Sumut
- Sulut United

=== Name changes ===
- Adhyaksa removed "Farmel" from its official name and changed their full name to Adhyaksa Football Club, underneath the stewardship of the Public Prosecution Service of Indonesia.
- Persipal removed "Babel United" from its official name and change their full name to Persipal Football Club, having previously acquired Muba Babel United to play in 2022–23 season.
- PSPS removed "Riau" from its official name and change back their full name to PSPS Pekanbaru from this season.

=== Teams by province ===
Note: teams are divided within this list according to the location of the stadiums that they're playing at this season instead of their respective home bases

Rank	Province	Number	Teams
1	Central Java	7	Adhyaksa, Bhayangkara Presisi, Nusantara United, Persekat, Persijap, Persiku, and Persipa
2	East Java	5	Deltras, Gresik United, Persela, Persibo, and RANS Nusantara
3	West Java	4	Bekasi City, Persikabo 1973, Persikas, and PSKC
4	Banten	2	Dejan and Persikota
4	(Papua (province)) Papua	2	Persewar and Persipura
6	Aceh	1	Persiraja
6	Central Sulawesi	1	Persipal
6	North Sumatra	1	PSMS
6	Riau	1	PSPS
6	South Sumatra	1	Sriwijaya
6	(Special Region of Yogyakarta) Yogyakarta	1	PSIM

=== Stadiums and locations ===
Locations of non-Java-based 2024–25 Liga 2 teams.
Red: Group 1; Yellow: Group 2; Blue: Group 3
Locations of Java-based 2024–25 Liga 2 teams.
Red: Group 1; Yellow: Group 2; Blue: Group 3

Team	Location	Stadium	Capacity	2023–24 season
Adhyaksa	Tangerang Regency	Sriwedari, at Surakarta (Note: Due to the lack of available stadiums in the Tangerang Regency, Adhyaksa will play their home matches at the Sriwedari Stadium in Surakarta.)	12,000	Liga 3, National Phase Champion
Bekasi City	Bekasi	Purnawarman, at Purwakarta (Note: Due to the ongoing renovation of the Patriot Candrabhaga Stadium, Bekasi City will play their home matches at the Purnawarman Stadium in Purwakarta.)	10,000	4th in Championship Round (Group Y)
Bhayangkara Presisi	Jakarta	Tri Sanja, at Tegal	10,000	17th in Liga 1 (Relegated)
Bhayangkara Presisi	Jakarta	Pakansari, at Bogor	30,000	17th in Liga 1 (Relegated)
Dejan	Depok	Kera Sakti, at South Tangerang	500	Liga 3, National Phase Fourth Round (2nd in Group 1)
Deltras	Sidoarjo	Gelora Delta (Note: Due to the ongoing renovation of the Gelora Delta Stadium, Deltras will play their first three home matches at the Brawijaya Stadium in Kediri.)	19,400	2nd in Championship Round (Group Y)
Gresik United	Gresik	Gelora Joko Samudro (Note: Due to the ongoing renovation of the Gelora Joko Samudro Stadium, Gresik United will play their first four home matches at the Tuban Sport Center Stadium in Tuban.)	25,000	2nd in Championship Round (Group Z)
Nusantara United	Salatiga	Kebo Giro, at Boyolali (Note: As the city of Nusantara is still under construction until at least 2024, Nusantara United will temporarily base themselves at the city of Salatiga, however they will play league games at the Kebo Giro Stadium in nearby Boyolali.)	12,000	1st in Relegation Round (Group B)
Persekat	Tegal	Tri Sanja	10,000	2nd in Relegation Round (Group D)
Persela	Lamongan	Tuban Sport Center, at Tuban (Note: Due to the ongoing renovation of the Surajaya Stadium, Persela will play their home matches at the Tuban Sport Center Stadium in Tuban.)	15,000	3rd in Championship Round (Group Y)
Persewar	Waropen	Mandala, at Jayapura (Note: Due to the lack of available stadiums in Waropen, Persewar will play their home matches at the Mandala Stadium in Jayapura.)	30,000	3rd in Championship Round (Group Z)
Persibo	Bojonegoro	Letjen Haji Sudirman	15,000	Liga 3, National Phase Runner Up
Persijap	Jepara	Gelora Bumi Kartini	8,570	1st in Relegation Round (Group C)
Persijap	Jepara	Moch. Soebroto, at Magelang (Note: Due to the ongoing renovation of the Gelora Bumi Kartini Stadium, Persijap will play their home matches until December 2024 at the Moch. Soebroto Stadium in Magelang.)	30,000	1st in Relegation Round (Group C)
Persikabo 1973	Bogor	Pakansari	30,000	18th in Liga 1 (Relegated)
Persikas	Subang	Persikas	5,000	Liga 3, National Phase Fourth Round (3rd in Group 1)
Persikota	Tangerang	Benteng Reborn	7,500	Liga 3, National Phase Fourth Round (2nd in Group 2)
Persiku	Kudus	Wergu Wetan	15,000	Liga 3, National Phase Fourth Round (3rd in Group 2)
Persipa	Pati	Joyokusumo	10,000	2nd in Relegation Round (Group C)
Persipal	Palu	Gawalise	20,000	4th in Championship Round (Group Z)
Persipura	Jayapura	Mandala	30,000	1st in Relegation Round (Group D)
Persiraja	Banda Aceh	Harapan Bangsa	18,000	4th in Liga 2
Persiraja	Banda Aceh	H. Dimurthala	8,000	4th in Liga 2
PSIM	Yogyakarta	Mandala Krida	35,000	3rd in Championship Round (Group X)
PSKC	Cimahi	Jalak Harupat, at Bandung (Note: Due to the ongoing renovation of the Sangkuriang Stadium, PSKC will play their home matches at the Jalak Harupat Stadium in Bandung.)	27,000	2nd in Relegation Round (Group A)
PSKC	Cimahi	Gelora Bandung Lautan Api, at Bandung	38,000	2nd in Relegation Round (Group A)
PSMS	Medan	Baharuddin Siregar, at Deli Serdang (Note: Due to the ongoing renovation of the Teladan Stadium, PSMS will play their home matches at the Baharuddin Siregar Stadium in Deli Serdang.)	15,000	4th in Championship Round (Group X)
PSPS	Pekanbaru	Kaharudin Nasution	30,000	2nd in Relegation Round (Group B)
RANS Nusantara	Nusantara	Untung Suropati, at Pasuruan	5,000	16th in Liga 1 (Relegated)
Sriwijaya	Palembang	Gelora Sriwijaya	23,000	1st in Relegation Round (Group A)

== Personnel and kits ==
Note: Flags indicate national team as has been defined under FIFA eligibility rules. Players and coaches may hold more than one non-FIFA nationality.

Team	Head coach	Captain	Kit manufacturer	Main kit sponsor	Other kit sponsor(s)
Adhyaksa	(Indonesia) Ade Suhendra	(Indonesia) Dedi Hartono	(Indonesia) Benz	Adhyaksa	List: Front: Pertamina, Farmel, Pelindo, Bank BJB, Le Minerale, Bank Jateng; Back: Farmel Kontraktor, Pakar IPAL Indonesia; Sleeves: RS Premier Bintaro; Shorts: None
Bekasi City	(Indonesia) Widyantoro	(Indonesia) Tegar Pangestu	(Indonesia) Calma	PStore	List: Front: Axioo; Back: None; Sleeves: Air Alam; Shorts: None
Bhayangkara Presisi	(Indonesia) Hanim Sugiarto	(Indonesia) Dendy Sulistyawan	(Indonesia) Mills	BNI	List: Front: Envi; Back: None; Sleeves: Gojek, Jasa Raharja; Shorts: None
Dejan	(Indonesia) Budi Sudarsono	(Indonesia) Boateng Prince	(Indonesia) Asix	Careguard	List: Front: CareFast; Back: Se'Indonesia; Sleeves: None; Shorts: None
Deltras	(Indonesia) Bejo Sugiantoro	(Indonesia) Hariono	(Indonesia) Lekaw	Kapal Api	List: Front: RANS Entertainment; Back: Sarung Al Hijaz; Sleeves: None; Shorts: None
Gresik United	(Indonesia) Djajang Nurdjaman	(Brazil) Renan Silva	(Indonesia) GUS Apparel^{1}	ISO Plus	List: Front: Phonska Plus, Wilmar, PT Smelting; Back: Minyak Goreng Fortune, Sarung Wadimor; Sleeves: None; Shorts: None
Nusantara United	(Indonesia) Stefan Keeltjes	(Indonesia) Supardi Nasir	(Indonesia) Benz	Adaro	List: Front: Trima+, Nasmoco, Alderon, Indosat; Back: Trimegah Sekuritas; Sleeves: None; Shorts: None
Persekat	(Indonesia) I Putu Gede	(Indonesia) Chrystna Bhagascara	(Indonesia) Sebayu^{1}	Ersal Aburizal	List: Front: MerahPutih Advertising, Tegal Road Construction, PT Harbas; Back: Sentosa Beton Perkasa, RS Mitra Keluarga; Sleeves: Bhamada University; Shorts: None
Persela	(Indonesia) Zulkifli Syukur	(Indonesia) Tony Sucipto	(Indonesia) Etams	Belikopi	List: Front: None; Back: Lyly Bakery, Belikopi+; Sleeves: None; Shorts: None
Persewar	(Indonesia) Eduard Ivakdalam	(Indonesia) Yohanis Tjoe	(Indonesia) Zestien	None	List: Front: None; Back: Ndi Sowosio Ndi Korako; Sleeves: None; Shorts: None
Persibo	(Indonesia) Kahudi Wahyu Widodo	(Indonesia) Osas Saha	(Indonesia) PGRPN	None (H & A) / Kapal Api (3rd)	List: Front: Winn Gas; Back: Farmel, Pakar IPAL Indonesia; Sleeves: Kapal Api (H & A) / None (3rd); Shorts: None
Persijap	(Indonesia) Widodo Cahyono Putro	(Indonesia) Fikron Afriyanto	(Indonesia) Adhoc	Oasis Waters	List: Front: None; Back: Honbun Bakery; Sleeves: None; Shorts: None
Persikabo 1973	(Indonesia) Budiardjo Thalib	(Indonesia) Abdul Rahman	(Australia) Rodo Sports (1st half) (Indonesia) KABO Apparel^{1} (2nd half)	None (1st half) / Bejo Bakul Mobilindo (2nd half) / Klinik Utama Citius (relegation round)	List: Front: Le Minerale (1st half) / Klinik Utama Citius (2nd half) / Le Minerale (relegation round); Back: None (regular round) / Bejo Bakul Mobilindo (relegation round); Sleeves: None (1st half) / Le Minerale (2nd half) / None (relegation round); Shorts: None
Persikas	(Indonesia) Didin Gultom	(Indonesia) Hamdan Zamzani	(Indonesia) Abex	Wahana Mitra Semesta	List: Front: Bank BJB, Aqua, PT Subang Sejahtera, Subang Smartpolitan, Forum BUMD, RSUD Subang; Back: by.U, PGRI Subang, BPJS Ketenagakerjaan, KORPRI, Clue Today; Sleeves: Magna; Shorts: None
Persikota	(Indonesia) Miftahudin	(Indonesia) Hapit Ibrahim	(Indonesia) PGRPN	Pakar IPAL Indonesia (1st half) / RCB (2nd half)	List: Front: Farmel, RCB (1st half) / NOB1 Racing, UMA Racing (2nd half); Back: Farmel Kontraktor / Pakar IPAL Indonesia (2nd half); Sleeves: sariasih.com; Shorts: None
Persiku	(Indonesia) Alfiat	(Indonesia) Jajang Mulyana	(Indonesia) Total Sportswear	PLN	List: Front: Poltekun, Pertamina, MIND ID, Mandiri Taspen; Back: PLN, Pertamina, MIND ID; Sleeves: None; Shorts: None
Persipa	(Indonesia) Bambang Nurdiansyah	(Indonesia) Wahyu Sukarta	(Indonesia) Calma	Sukun (H & A) / None (3rd)	List: Front: PSF Group, Bank KCA, Crystalline (H & A) / None (3rd); Back: Monster Laut International, RS Keluarga Sehat (H & A) / Pesantenan (3rd); Sleeves: Dua Kelinci, SJK, SAB (H & A) / None (3rd); Shorts: None
Persipal	(Indonesia) Achmad Zulkifli	(Indonesia) Rendy Saputra	(Indonesia) Bam Sportswear	Bank Sulteng	List: Front: IMIP, Crystalline; Back: None; Sleeves: Poso Energy; Shorts: None
Persipura	(Indonesia) Ricardo Salampessy	(Indonesia) Ian Kabes	(Indonesia) SPECS	Bank Papua	List: Front: PT Freeport Indonesia; Back: SIMANJA, Kartu Debit Persipura; Sleeves: None; Shorts: None
Persiraja	(Indonesia) Akhyar Ilyas	(Indonesia) Andik Vermansah	(Indonesia) Trops	Bank Syariah Indonesia	List: Front: PEMA, Nitrea, Dek Gam Foundation, Pertamina; Back: RSUD Meuraxa Kota Banda Aceh, PDAM Tirta Daroy; Sleeves: Kyriad Muraya Hotel, ARTOTEL Wanderlust; Shorts: None
PSIM	(Indonesia) Erwan Hendrawanto (caretaker)	(Indonesia) Rendra Teddy	(Indonesia) Apex	Bukalapak	List: Front: BMoney, Russ & Co, Rexona, Taro Snack; Back: Tolak Angin, Extra Joss; Sleeves: None; Shorts: None
PSKC	(Indonesia) Kas Hartadi	(Indonesia) Dias Angga Putra	(Indonesia) DRX	Garudayaksa Football Academy	List: Front: DRX Token; Back: Crystalline, Larutan Penyegar Panjang Jiwo; Sleeves: None; Shorts: None
PSMS	(Indonesia) Nil Maizar	(Indonesia) Rachmad Hidayat	(Indonesia) Northon	Bank Sumut	List: Front: Inalum, Mahkota Fertilizer; Back: Jovem Studio, AM Corporate; Sleeves: Oxygen Denim; Shorts: None
PSPS	(Indonesia) Aji Santoso	(Brazil) Douglas Cruz	(Indonesia) Curva Sport	Pusat Grosir Metro Tanah Abang	List: Front: RS Awal Bros, Riau Petroleum; Back: None; Sleeves: None; Shorts: None
RANS Nusantara	(Indonesia) Edy Sugiarto	(Indonesia) Syaiful Indra Cahya	(Singapore) HUNDRED	D’Cellule	List: Front: None; Back: None; Sleeves: None; Shorts: None
Sriwijaya	(Indonesia) Hendri Susilo	(Indonesia) Manda Cingi	(Indonesia) CircleG	BUN	List: Front: Bank Sumsel Babel, Pupuk Sriwidjaja, Cimory, Nox Skin Expresso; Back: None; Sleeves: None; Shorts: None

Notes:

1. Apparel made by team.

=== Coaching changes ===
==== Pre-season ====
Team	Outgoing coach	Manner of departure	Date of vacancy	Replaced by	Date of appointment
PSMS	(Indonesia) Legimin Raharjo	End of caretaker role	3 February 2024	(Indonesia) Nil Maizar	15 June 2024
Persijap	(Indonesia) Alfiat	End of contract	3 February 2024	(Indonesia) Kahudi Wahyu	23 July 2024
Persipal	(Indonesia) Bambang Nurdiansyah	End of contract	3 February 2024	(Indonesia) Achmad Zulkifli	10 July 2024
Deltras	(Indonesia) Widodo C. Putro	Signed by Arema	10 February 2024	(Indonesia) Bejo Sugiantoro	14 July 2024
Persela	(Indonesia) Djadjang Nurdjaman	Signed by Persikabo 1973	13 March 2024	(Indonesia) Didik Ludianto	17 July 2024
Sriwijaya	(Indonesia) Hendri Susilo	Signed by Semen Padang	25 March 2024	(Indonesia) Jafri Sastra	5 July 2024
Persiraja	(Indonesia) Achmad Zulkifli	End of contract	31 March 2024	(Indonesia national football team) Tony Ho	17 July 2024
PSIM	(Indonesia) Kas Hartadi	End of contract	31 March 2024	(Indonesia) Seto Nurdiantoro	4 May 2024
PSPS	(Indonesia) Ridwan Saragih	End of contract	14 April 2024	(Indonesia) Aji Santoso	10 June 2024
Gresik United	(Indonesia) Agus Indra Kurniawan	End of contract	30 April 2024	(Indonesia) Stefan Keeltjes	1 July 2024
RANS Nusantara	(Argentina) Alfredo Vera	End of contract	30 April 2024	(Indonesia) Edi Sudiarto	30 April 2024
PSKC	(Indonesia) Jafri Sastra	End of contract	24 June 2024	(Indonesia) Kas Hartadi	30 July 2024
Persiku	(Indonesia) Denny Rumba	Demoted to assistant coach	1 July 2024	(Indonesia) Sudirman	15 July 2024
Persekat	(Indonesia) Mial Armand	Signed by Persikas	10 July 2024	(Indonesia) I Putu Gede	16 July 2024
Persikas	(Indonesia) Didin Gultom	Became technical director	10 July 2024	(Indonesia) Mial Armand	10 July 2024
Persibo	(Indonesia) I Putu Gede	End of contract	3 July 2024	(Indonesia) Bonggo Pribadi	14 July 2024
Persikota	(Indonesia) Fachrudin	End of contract	19 July 2024	(Indonesia) Delfi Adri	19 July 2024
Persipa	(Indonesia) Nazal Mustofa	End of contract	26 July 2024	(Indonesia) Bambang Nurdiansyah	26 July 2024
Persibo	(Indonesia) Bonggo Pribadi	Resigned	31 July 2024	(Indonesia) Regi Aditya Yonathan	31 July 2024
Persiraja	(Indonesia) Tony Ho	Sacked	28 August 2024	(Indonesia) Akhyar Ilyas	2 September 2024
Bhayangkara Presisi	(Brazil) Gomes de Oliveira	Demoted to assistant coach	1 August 2024	(Indonesia) Hanim Sugiarto	1 August 2024
Dejan	(Indonesia) Herman	Demoted to assistant coach	1 August 2024	(Indonesia) Danang Suryadi	1 August 2024

==== During the season ====
Team	Outgoing coach	Manner of departure	Date of vacancy	Round	Week	Position in table		Replaced by	Date of appointment
Team	Outgoing coach	Manner of departure	Date of vacancy	Round	Week	Group	Position	Replaced by	Date of appointment
Persela	(Indonesia) Didik Ludianto	Resigned	11 September 2024	Regular round	1	3	4th	(Indonesia) Zulkifli Syukur	11 September 2024
Sriwijaya	(Indonesia) Jafri Sastra	Sacked	28 September 2024	Regular round	4	1	9th	(Indonesia) Hendri Susilo	3 October 2024
Persiku	(Indonesia) Sudirman	Resigned	6 October 2024	Regular round	5	2	6th	(Indonesia) Awwaludin (caretaker)	6 October 2024
Gresik United	(Indonesia) Stefan Keeltjes	Resigned	30 October 2024	Regular round	6	3	5th	(Indonesia) Djadjang Nurdjaman	5 November 2024
Persikabo 1973	(Indonesia) Djadjang Nurdjaman	Resigned	31 October 2024	Regular round	9	1	9th	(Indonesia) Budiardjo Thalib	4 November 2024
Dejan	(Indonesia) Danang Suryadi	Sacked	31 October 2024	Regular round	9	1	7th	(Indonesia) Herman (caretaker)	1 November 2024
Persijap	(Indonesia) Kahudi Wahyu Widodo	Mutual consent	1 November 2024	Regular round	9	2	3rd	(Indonesia) Widodo Cahyono Putro	4 November 2024
Persiku	(Indonesia) Awwaludin	End of caretaker role	5 November 2024	Regular round	9	2	6th	(Indonesia) Bonggo Pribadi	5 November 2024
Persibo	(Indonesia) Regi Aditya Yonathan	Mutual consent	19 November 2024	Regular round	8	3	1st	(Indonesia) Kahudi Wahyu Widodo	20 November 2024
Dejan	(Indonesia) Herman	End of caretaker role	6 December 2024	Regular round	13	1	7th	(Indonesia) Budi Sudarsono	6 December 2024
Nusantara United	(Indonesia) Salahudin	Mutual consent	16 December 2024	Regular round	15	2	5th	(Indonesia) I Wayan Arsana (caretaker)	16 December 2024
Nusantara United	(Indonesia) I Wayan Arsana	End of caretaker role	27 December 2024	Regular round	16	2	5th	(Indonesia) Stefan Keeltjes	27 December 2024
PSIM	(Indonesia) Seto Nurdiantoro	Mutual consent	6 January 2025	Regular round	17	2	3rd	(Indonesia) Erwan Hendrawanto (caretaker)	6 January 2025
Persikas	(Indonesia) Mial Armand	Sacked	8 January 2025	Regular round	17	2	9th	(Indonesia) Didin Gultom	8 January 2025
Persikota	(Indonesia) Delfi Adri	Sacked	9 January 2025	Regular round	17	1	6th	(Indonesia) Miftahudin	10 January 2025
Persiku	(Indonesia) Bonggo Pribadi	Sacked	5 February 2025	Relegation round	3	J	4th	(Indonesia) Alfiat	6 February 2025

== Foreign players ==
Starting from this season, Liga Indonesia Baru announced an increase in the foreign player quota to three foreign players.

- Players named in **bold** indicates the player was registered during the mid-season transfer window.
- Former players named in italics are players that were out of squad or left the club within the season, after the pre-season transfer window, or in the mid-season transfer window, and at least had one appearance.

Team	Player 1	Player 2	Player 3	Former players
Adhyaksa	(Mali) **Makan Konaté**	(Serbia) Aleksa Andrejić	(Serbia) Ivan Marić	(Brazil) Rafael Conrado
Bekasi City	(Curaçao) **Meghon Valpoort**	(Morocco) **Sami El Anabi**	(South Korea) **Moon Chang-jin**	(Brazil) Jhon Cley (Brazil) Mosquito (Brazil) Renan Alves
Bhayangkara Presisi	(Islamic Republic of Afghanistan) **Fareed Sadat**	(Brazil) **Felipe Ryan**	(Brazil) Léo Silva	(Brazil) Felipe Ferreira (Uruguay) Matías Mier
Dejan	(Kyrgyzstan) **Danila Sokirchenko**	(Russia) **Artyom Serdyuk**	(Tajikistan) **Komron Tursunov**	(Ivory Coast) Boman Aimé (Mali) Salifii Diarra (Timor-Leste) Thiago Fernandes
Deltras	(Brazil) Artur	(Brazil) Emerson Carioca	(Guinea) **Sekou Sylla**	(Brazil) Nixon Guylherme
Gresik United	(Brazil) **Jose Wilkson**	(Brazil) Renan Silva	(Montenegro) **Marko Ivanovic**	(Serbia) Đorđe Maksimović (Uzbekistan) Azamat Abdullayev
Nusantara United	(Brazil) **Vlademir Everton**	(England) **Adam Mitter**	(Uzbekistan) **Mukhiddin Odilov**	(Japan) Shunta Nakamura (Morocco) Sami El Anabi (United States) Jason Romero
Persekat	(Brazil) **Felipe Ferreira**	(Brazil) Iuri	(Portugal) **Adilson Silva**	(Brazil) Felipe Ryan (Ivory Coast) Ibrahim Dicko
Persela	(Chad) Ezechiel N'Douassel	(France) **Fabien Garcia**	(South Korea) **Kim Do-hyun**	(Brazil) Anderson Nascimento (United States) Lukman Ahmed-Shaibu
Persewar				
Persibo	(France) Enzo Célestine	(Iran) Taher Jahanbakhsh	(Portugal) Vítor Barata	
Persijap	(Brazil) **Léo Lelis**	(Brazil) Rosalvo	(Tajikistan) Rakhmatsho Rakhmatzoda	(Brazil) Elias
Persikabo 1973	(Belarus) **Artyom Sokol**	(Georgia (country)) **Nugzar Spanderashvili**	(Russia) **Nikita Melnikov**	(Islamic Republic of Afghanistan) Fareed Sadat (Mali) Makan Konaté (Brazil) Léo Lelis
Persikas	(Brazil) Guilherme Batata	(Brazil) **Pedrão**	(Timor-Leste) **Thiago Fernandes**	(Ecuador) Kevin Mina (Ukraine) Yevhen Bokhashvili
Persikota	(Brazil) **Eduardo Andrade**	(Brazil) Paulo Henrique	(Serbia) **Nikola Kovačević**	(Brazil) Pedrão (South Korea) Kim Do-hyun
Persiku	(Ghana) **Richard Gadze**	(Japan) Renshi Yamaguchi	(Uzbekistan) **Murodjon Tuychibaev**	(Chile) Reinaldo Ahumada (Venezuela) Ronny Maza
Persipa	(Colombia) Mateo Palacios	(Japan) **Kenta Hara**	(Uzbekistan) Mirkomil Lokaev	(Nigeria) Sunday Song
Persipal	(Ukraine) Mykhaylo Kaluhin	(United States) **Lukman Ahmed-Shaibu**		(Brazil) Lucas Prati (Serbia) Dejan Meleg
Persipura	(Iran) Ali Nouri Zangir	(United States) Jonny Campbell		
Persiraja	(Brazil) **Alef**	(Brazil) **Matheus Machado**	(England) Deri Corfe	(Brazil) Eduardo Andrade (England) Adam Mitter
PSIM	(Islamic Republic of Afghanistan) **Omid Popalzay**	(Brazil) Rafinha	(Japan) Yusaku Yamadera	(Brazil) Pedrinho
PSKC	(Bhutan) **Chencho Gyeltshen**	(Colombia) **Joao Rodríguez**	(Uzbekistan) **Mukhammadali Tursunov**	(Brazil) Matheus Silva (Japan) Kenta Hara (Cape Verde) Steven Pereira
PSMS	(Brazil) Fábio Gama	(Brazil) Juninho Cabral	(Croatia) Sebastijan Antić	
PSPS	(Brazil) Douglas Cruz	(Colombia) Jhon Mena	(Japan) **Noriki Akada**	(Islamic Republic of Afghanistan) Omid Popalzay
RANS Nusantara	(Belarus) **Ivan Veras**	(Kyrgyzstan) Bektur Talgat Uulu	(Venezuela) **Ronny Maza**	(Brazil) Jô Santos (Kenya) Ismael Dunga
Sriwijaya				(Bhutan) Chencho Gyeltshen (Brazil) Gabriel Silva (Curaçao) Meghon Valpoort

== Regular round ==
A total of 26 teams were drawn into 3 groups of nine or eight teams based on the geographical location of their homebase. The regular round will be played in home-and-away round-robin matches.

The top three teams from groups 1 and 2 and the top two teams from group 3 will advance to the championship round. The other 18 teams will enter to the relegation round.

=== Group 1 ===
Pos	Team	Pld	W	D	L	GF	GA	GD	Pts	Qualification	PRJ	PKC	PKU	MDN	FBC	TNG	DJN	SFC	PBO
1	Persiraja	16	10	4	2	33	17	+16	34	Qualification to the Championship round		1–1	1–1	2–1	2–1	6–2	2–0	1–0	3–1
2	PSKC	16	8	3	5	19	15	+4	27 (Note: Ranked on head-to-head points: PSKC 4, PSPS 1.)	Qualification to the Championship round	0–3		1–0	1–0	0–1	3–1	3–0	2–1	2–0
3	PSPS	16	7	6	3	27	19	+8	27	Qualification to the Championship round	1–1	1–1		1–0	0–0	1–0	2–0	2–0	3–1
4	PSMS	16	7	5	4	23	13	+10	26	Qualification to the Relegation round	1–2	4–2	1–1		0–0	1–0	1–1	1–0	4–1
5	Bekasi City	16	7	4	5	23	18	+5	25	Qualification to the Relegation round	2–0	1–0	4–3	0–2		0–0	1–2	2–1	5–0
6	Persikota	16	6	2	8	23	24	−1	20 (Note: Tied on head-to-head points. Ranked on head-to-head goal difference: Persikota +1, Dejan –1.)	Qualification to the Relegation round	1–0	0–1	4–6	0–1	2–1		3–1	2–0	6–1
7	Dejan	16	5	5	6	17	23	−6	20	Qualification to the Relegation round	1–1	1–0	0–1	2–2	1–1	1–0		1–0	3–0
8	Sriwijaya	16	3	5	8	19	23	−4	14	Qualification to the Relegation round	2–4	1–1	3–2	0–0	5–3	0–0	1–1		5–1
9	Persikabo 1973	16	1	2	13	15	47	−32	5	Qualification to the Relegation round	2–4	0–1	2–2	0–4	0–1	1–2	5–2	0–0	

Source: Liga 2 2024–25
Legend: Blue = home team win; Yellow = draw; Red = away team win.
Rules for classification: 1) Points; 2) Head-to-head points; 3) Head-to-head goal difference; 4) Head-to-head goals scored; 5) Goal difference; 6) Goals scored; 7) Fair-play points; 8) Draw.

=== Group 2 ===
Pos	Team	Pld	W	D	L	GF	GA	GD	Pts	Qualification	BFC	JOG	JAP	AFC	NFC	TGL	PTI	KDS	PES
1	Bhayangkara Presisi	16	9	6	1	27	7	+20	33	Qualification to the Championship round		0–1	4–0	1–0	2–1	0–0	1–0	0–0	7–0
2	PSIM	16	8	5	3	28	7	+21	29	Qualification to the Championship round	1–2		0–0	3–0	5–0	3–0	1–0	2–0	5–0
3	Persijap	16	7	7	2	20	9	+11	28	Qualification to the Championship round	0–2	0–0		0–0	3–0	1–0	3–0	0–0	3–0
4	Adhyaksa	16	7	4	5	20	14	+6	25	Qualification to the Relegation round	1–1	0–0	0–1		2–0	0–2	3–1	1–0	5–0
5	Nusantara United	16	4	7	5	14	21	−7	19	Qualification to the Relegation round	0–1	1–1	0–0	2–1		0–0	0–0	0–0	4–2
6	Persekat	16	5	3	8	17	21	−4	18 (Note: Tied on head-to-head points. Ranked on head-to-head goal difference: Persekat +1, Persipa –1.)	Qualification to the Relegation round	1–4	0–0	1–3	0–2	1–2		2–0	2–1	4–0
7	Persipa	16	4	6	6	11	16	−5	18	Qualification to the Relegation round	1–1	3–1	1–1	1–1	1–1	1–0		0–0	1–0
8	Persiku	16	3	7	6	8	15	−7	16	Qualification to the Relegation round	0–0	0–5	1–1	1–2	1–1	1–0	0–1		2–0
9	Persikas	16	2	1	13	10	45	−35	7	Qualification to the Relegation round	1–1	1–0	0–4	1–2	1–2	3–4	1–0	0–1	

Source: Liga 2 2024–25
Legend: Blue = home team win; Yellow = draw; Red = away team win.
Rules for classification: 1) Points; 2) Head-to-head points; 3) Head-to-head goal difference; 4) Head-to-head goals scored; 5) Goal difference; 6) Goals scored; 7) Fair-play points; 8) Draw.

=== Group 3 ===
Pos	Team	Pld	W	D	L	GF	GA	GD	Pts	Qualification	PSL	DTS	PSP	PSB	PAL	GRS	RFC	WAR
1	Persela	14	7	5	2	23	13	+10	26	Qualification to the Championship round		2–2	2–1	3–1	0–0	3–1	1–1	3–0 (Note: The match was awarded as a 3–0 victory to Persela, after Persewar did not send their team for the match and failed to report to PSSI regarding their unpreparedness to play several days before the match.)
2	Deltras	14	6	7	1	22	11	+11	25	Qualification to the Championship round	2–2		2–0	3–0 (Note: The match was supposed to be ended as a 1–0 victory to Deltras but were interrupted after some controversy surfaced during the match especially the Persibo goal scored by Amir Hamzah, where the Deltras team considered the goal invalid because it was scored in a quick free kick position immediately after the foul occurred and the referee had not yet blown the whistle to pointing the free kick spot. The PSSI Disciplinary Committee has given their verdict to annul Persibo's goal and ordered the interrupted match to be resumed at a neutral venue without spectators, but Persibo appealed the decision and was granted as it is not on Disciplinary Committee's stand ground. PT LIB announced the final status of the interrupted match. Persibo decided not to resume the interrupted match on 18 January 2025.)	1–1	2–1	3–0	2–0
3	Persipura	14	7	2	5	25	14	+11	23	Qualification to the Relegation round	0–1	1–1		1–2	4–0	3–1	4–0	2–1
4	Persibo	14	7	2	5	25	17	+8	23	Qualification to the Relegation round	2–0	0–0	2–3		1–0	2–1	7–0	3–0
5	Persipal	14	6	4	4	18	18	0	22	Qualification to the Relegation round	1–1	2–1	0–3	1–0		1–0	2–0	3–2
6	Gresik United	14	6	3	5	18	16	+2	21	Qualification to the Relegation round	2–1	1–1	0–0	1–0	3–2		3–0	1–0
7	RANS Nusantara	14	2	3	9	9	36	−27	9	Qualification to the Relegation round	0–3	0–0	1–0	2–2	0–3	0–2		3–5
8	Persewar (Note: Persewar was deducted nine points by the PSSI Disciplinary Committee.)	14	1	2	11	16	31	−15	−4	Qualification to the Relegation round	0–1	1–2	1–3	2–3	2–2	1–1	1–2	

Source: Liga 2 2024–25
Legend: Blue = home team win; Yellow = draw; Red = away team win.
Rules for classification: 1) Points; 2) Head-to-head points; 3) Head-to-head goal difference; 4) Head-to-head goals scored; 5) Goal difference; 6) Goals scored; 7) Fair-play points; 8) Draw.

== Relegation round ==
The bottom eighteen teams from the regular round will be divided into 4 groups of four teams to play home-and-away round-robin matches.

The bottom two teams from each group will be relegated to the 2025–26 Liga Nusantara, while the third place teams from Group J and K will enter to the relegation play-offs.

=== Group H ===
Pos	Team	Pld	W	D	L	GF	GA	GD	Pts	Relegation	MDN	SFC	NFC	TNG
1	PSMS	6	5	0	1	14	2	+12	15			2–0	4–0	3–1
2	Sriwijaya	6	3	0	3	8	8	0	9		1–0		3–0	1–0
3	Nusantara United (R)	6	2	1	3	6	12	−6	7	Relegation to the 2025–26 Liga Nusantara	0–1	2–1		1–0
4	Persikota (R)	6	1	1	4	8	14	−6	4	Relegation to the 2025–26 Liga Nusantara	0–4	4–2	3–3	

Source: Liga 2 2024–25
Legend: Blue = home team win; Yellow = draw; Red = away team win.
Rules for classification: 1) Points; 2) Head-to-head points; 3) Head-to-head goal difference; 4) Head-to-head goals scored; 5) Goal difference; 6) Goals scored; 7) Fair-play points; 8) Draw.
(R) Relegated

=== Group I ===
Pos	Team	Pld	W	D	L	GF	GA	GD	Pts	Relegation	AFC	FBC	DJN	PBO
1	Adhyaksa	6	3	3	0	8	3	+5	12			0–0	1–0	1–1
2	Bekasi City	6	3	3	0	9	5	+4	12		1–1		1–1	4–2
3	Dejan (R)	6	2	1	3	9	9	0	7	Relegation to the 2025–26 Liga Nusantara	1–2	0–1		4–3
4	Persikabo 1973 (R)	6	0	1	5	8	17	−9	1	Relegation to the 2025–26 Liga Nusantara	0–3	1–2	1–3	

Source: Liga 2 2024–25
Legend: Blue = home team win; Yellow = draw; Red = away team win.
Rules for classification: 1) Points; 2) Head-to-head points; 3) Head-to-head goal difference; 4) Head-to-head goals scored; 5) Goal difference; 6) Goals scored; 7) Fair-play points; 8) Draw.
(R) Relegated

=== Group J ===
Pos	Team	Pld	W	D	L	GF	GA	GD	Pts	Qualification or relegation	KDS	TGL	PSB	GRS	WAR
1	Persiku	8	5	1	2	6	3	+3	16			2–1	1–0	1–0	1–0
2	Persekat	8	4	1	3	12	10	+2	13 (Note: Tied on head-to-head points. Ranked on head-to-head goal difference: Persekat +1, Persibo –1.)		1–0		2–0	1–2	2–1
3	Persibo (R)	8	4	1	3	14	11	+3	13	Qualification to the Relegation play-off	1–0	2–1		0–0	3–1
4	Gresik United (R)	8	3	3	2	10	8	+2	12	Relegation to the 2025–26 Liga Nusantara	0–1	2–2	4–2		2–1
5	Persewar (R)	8	0	2	6	6	16	−10	2	Relegation to the 2025–26 Liga Nusantara	0–0	1–2	2–6	0–0	

Source: Liga 2 2024–25
Legend: Blue = home team win; Yellow = draw; Red = away team win.
Rules for classification: 1) Points; 2) Head-to-head points; 3) Head-to-head goal difference; 4) Head-to-head goals scored; 5) Goal difference; 6) Goals scored; 7) Fair-play points; 8) Draw.
(R) Relegated

=== Group K ===
Pos	Team	Pld	W	D	L	GF	GA	GD	Pts	Qualification or relegation	PES	PAL	PSP	PTI	RFC
1	Persikas	8	5	1	2	8	5	+3	16			0–1	1–0	0–0	2–0
2	Persipal	8	5	0	3	10	5	+5	15		0–1		2–0	2–0	3–0
3	Persipura (O)	8	4	2	2	18	6	+12	14	Qualification to the Relegation play-off	3–0	3–0		1–1	8–0
4	Persipa (R)	8	2	3	3	9	7	+2	9	Relegation to the 2025–26 Liga Nusantara	0–1	1–0	1–2		1–1
5	RANS Nusantara (R)	8	0	2	6	3	25	−22	2	Relegation to the 2025–26 Liga Nusantara	1–3	0–2	1–1	0–5	

Source: Liga 2 2024–25
Legend: Blue = home team win; Yellow = draw; Red = away team win.
Rules for classification: 1) Points; 2) Head-to-head points; 3) Head-to-head goal difference; 4) Head-to-head goals scored; 5) Goal difference; 6) Goals scored; 7) Fair-play points; 8) Draw.
(O) Play-off winners; (R) Relegated

== Championship round ==
The top eight teams from the regular round will be divided into 2 groups of four teams to play home-and-away round-robin matches.

The group winners will advanced to the final and automatically promoted to the 2025–26 Liga 1, while the group runners-up will enter to the third place play-off to determined which team will get the final promotion ticket.

=== Group X ===
Pos	Team	Pld	W	D	L	GF	GA	GD	Pts	Promotion or qualification	JOG	PKU	PRJ	DTS
1	PSIM (C, P)	6	5	0	1	10	4	+6	15	Qualification to the Final and promotion to the 2025–26 Liga 1		2–1	2–0	1–0
2	PSPS	6	3	0	3	6	5	+1	9 (Note: Ranked on head-to-head points: PSPS 6, Persiraja 0.)	Qualification to the Promotion play-off	0–1		1–0	2–0
3	Persiraja	6	3	0	3	9	9	0	9		2–1	0–2		4–1
4	Deltras	6	1	0	5	6	13	−7	3		1–3	2–0	2–3	

Source: Liga 2 2024–25
Legend: Blue = home team win; Yellow = draw; Red = away team win.
Rules for classification: 1) Points; 2) Head-to-head points; 3) Head-to-head goal difference; 4) Head-to-head goals scored; 5) Goal difference; 6) Goals scored; 7) Fair-play points; 8) Draw.
(C) Champions; (P) Promoted

=== Group Y ===
Pos	Team	Pld	W	D	L	GF	GA	GD	Pts	Promotion or qualification	BFC	JAP	PKC	PSL
1	Bhayangkara Presisi (P)	6	2	3	1	7	4	+3	9 (Note: Ranked on head-to-head points: Bhayangkara Presisi 4, Persijap 1.)	Qualifiction to the Final and promotion to the 2025–26 Liga 1		3–0	0–1	2–2
2	Persijap (O, P)	6	2	3	1	8	7	+1	9	Qualification to the Promotion play-off	0–0		4–1	0–0
3	PSKC	6	2	2	2	8	10	−2	8		0–1	3–3		2–1
4	Persela	6	0	4	2	5	7	−2	4		1–1	0–1	1–1	

Source: Liga 2 2024–25
Legend: Blue = home team win; Yellow = draw; Red = away team win.
Rules for classification: 1) Points; 2) Head-to-head points; 3) Head-to-head goal difference; 4) Head-to-head goals scored; 5) Goal difference; 6) Goals scored; 7) Fair-play points; 8) Draw.
(O) Play-off winners; (P) Promoted

== Relegation & promotion play-offs ==
The play-offs will be played as a single match. If tied after regulation time, extra time and, if necessary, a penalty shoot-out will be used to decide the winning team.

=== Relegation play-off ===
The loser will be relegated to the 2025–26 Liga Nusantara.

28 February 2025
15:30 UTC+9

Persipura	2–1	Persibo
Rumakiek 39'; Boaz 90+1' (pen.)	Report	69' (pen.) Saha

Mandala Stadium, Jayapura
Attendance: 4,355
Referee: Naufal Adya Fairuski

=== Promotion play-off ===
The winner will be promoted to the 2025–26 Liga 1.

25 February 2025
19:00 UTC+7

Persijap	1–0	PSPS
Lelis 85'	Report

Gelora Bumi Kartini Stadium, Jepara Regency
Attendance: 8,320
Referee: Clarence Leow (Singapore)

== Final ==
The final will be played as a single match. If tied after regulation time, extra time and, if necessary, a penalty shoot-out will be used to decide the winning team.

26 February 2025
15:00 UTC+7

PSIM	2–1 (a.e.t.)	Bhayangkara Presisi
Rafinha 9'; Roken 95'	Report	71' Ryan

Manahan Stadium, Surakarta
Attendance: 15,586
Referee: Rio Permana Putra

== Season statistics ==
=== Top goalscorers ===
Rank	Player	Team	Goals
1	(Indonesia) Ramai Rumakiek	Persipura	22
2	(Brazil) Rafinha	PSIM	20
3	(Brazil) Juninho Cabral	PSMS	15
4	(England) Deri Corfe	Persiraja	14
5	(Chad) Ezechiel N'Douassel	Persela	13
6	(Indonesia) Osas Saha	Persibo	12
7	(Serbia) Aleksa Andrejić	Adhyaksa	10
7	(Brazil) Rosalvo	Persijap	10
7	(Brazil) Paulo Henrique	Persikota	10
10	(France) Enzo Célestine	Persibo	9
10	(Indonesia) Sirvi Arvani	Persikota	9
10	(Indonesia) Miftahul Hamdi	Persiraja	9
10	(Brazil) Matheus Silva	PSKC	9
13	(Indonesia) Rafly Ariyanto	Persekat	8
13	(Indonesia) Rachmad Hidayat	PSMS	8
13	(Indonesia) Ilham Fathoni	PSPS	8
13	(Curaçao) Meghon Valpoort	Sriwijaya (3); Bekasi City (5)	8
17	(Indonesia) Ilija Spasojević	Bhayangkara Presisi	7
17	(Islamic Republic of Afghanistan) Fareed Sadat	Persikabo 1973 (6); Bhayangkara Presisi (1)	7
17	(Islamic Republic of Afghanistan) Omid Popalzay	PSPS (6); PSIM (1)	7

=== Hat-tricks ===
Player	For	Against	Result	Date
(Islamic Republic of Afghanistan) Omid Popalzay	PSPS	Persikota	6–4 (A)	25 September 2024
(Bhutan) Chencho Gyeltshen^{4}	Sriwijaya	Persikabo 1973	5–1 (H)	6 October 2024
(Chad) Ezechiel N'Douassel	Persela	Gresik United	3–1 (H)	10 November 2024
(Brazil) Rafinha	PSIM	Nusantara United	5–0 (H)	1 December 2024
(Brazil) Paulo Henrique	Persikota	Persikabo 1973	6–1 (H)	8 December 2024
(Indonesia) Ramai Rumakiek	Persipura	Gresik United	3–1 (H)	14 December 2024
(Indonesia) Osas Saha	Persibo	RANS Nusantara	7–0 (H)	4 January 2025
(Indonesia) Sirvi Arvani	Persikota	Sriwijaya	4–2 (H)	30 January 2025
(Brazil) Rosalvo	Persijap	PSKC	4–1 (H)	7 February 2025
(Indonesia) Ramai Rumakiek^{6}	Persipura	RANS Nusantara	8–0 (H)	21 February 2025
(France) Enzo Célestine^{4}	Persibo	Persewar	6–2 (A)	25 February 2025

Note:

- ^{4} – player scored 4 goals
- ^{6} – player scored 6 goals

=== Top assists ===
Rank	Player	Club	Assist
1	(France) Enzo Célestine	Persibo	7
1	(Indonesia) Dwiki Mardiyanto	Deltras	7
3	(Indonesia) Fikri Ardiansyah	Persipal	6
4	(Portugal) Vítor Barata	Persibo	5
4	(Indonesia) Arya Gerryan	PSIM	5
4	(Indonesia) Andik Vermansah	Persiraja	5
4	(Indonesia) Miftahul Hamdi	Persiraja	5
4	(Islamic Republic of Afghanistan) Omid Popalzay	PSPS (4); PSIM (1)	5

=== Discipline ===
- Most yellow card(s): 8
  - (Indonesia) Galuh Nata (Adhyaksa)
- Most red card(s): 2
  - (Indonesia) Ganjar Mukti (Dejan)

== Attendances ==
=== Overall ===
Pos	Team	Total	High	Low	Average	Change
1	PSPS	94,883	15,835	4,529	8,626	+51.4%
2	PSIM	97,397	15,586	4,913	8,116	−11.8%
3	Persela	52,520	11,185	0	5,252	−11.8%
4	Persiraja	56,135	12,271	0	5,103	−66.1%
5	Persipal	50,205	8,321	837	4,564	+59.7%
6	Persijap	49,664	8,520	0	4,139	−21.2%
7	Persiku	43,744	5,749	983	3,977	n/a^{‡}
8	Sriwijaya	43,130	7,221	779	3,921	−24.9%
9	Persibo	41,646	8,372	356	3,786	n/a^{‡}
10	Persipura	28,141	5,267	1,571	2,345	−72.4%
11	Gresik United	22,578	5,356	218	2,258	−50.3%
12	Deltras	18,553	6,192	0	1,855	−61.5%
13	Persikota	18,052	3,219	0	1,641	n/a^{‡}
14	PSMS	16,760	4,000	0	1,524	−72.4%
15	Persekat	14,111	3,504	0	1,283	+3.4%
16	Persipa	11,645	2,567	0	970	−49.0%
17	Bekasi City	9,077	1,618	315	825	+11.8%
18	Bhayangkara Presisi	7,273	2,498	72	661	n/a^{†}
19	Nusantara United	5,811	667	195	528	−6.2%
20	Persikas	5,300	669	302	482	n/a^{‡}
21	Persikabo 1973	4,900	1,277	0	445	n/a^{†}
22	RANS Nusantara	3,315	2,253	0	301	n/a^{†}
23	Persewar	3,234	1,814	0	294	−89.6%
24	PSKC	2,929	500	75	266	−21.5%
25	Dejan	2,531	511	110	230	n/a^{‡}
26	Adhyaksa	1,099	357	0	100	n/a^{‡}
	League total	705,952	15,835	0	2,426	−32.2%

Source: Liga 2 2024–25
Notes:
^{†} Teams played previous season in Liga 1
^{‡} Teams played previous season in Liga 3

=== Home match played ===
Team \ Match played	Regular round								Championship round & Relegation round				Play-offs & Final	Total
Team \ Match played	1	2	3	4	5	6	7	8	1	2	3	4	Play-offs & Final	Total
Adhyaksa	357	98	0	0	150	98	91	96	111	98	0			1,099
Bekasi City	1,618	1,267	1,176	821	486	885	820	486	426	315	777			9,077
Bhayangkara Presisi	594	718	153	180	72	178	104	132	1,059	2,498	1,585			7,273
Dejan	120	155	250	274	511	235	123	353	125	110	275			2,531
Deltras	312	0	0	5,559	3,123	6,192	3,367		0^{9}	0^{9}	0^{9}			18,553
Gresik United	1,107	1,138	218	971	5,356	3,373	5,321		576	2,489	2,029	1,339		23,917
Nusantara United	667	666	557	195	615	480	630	565	470	494	472			5,811
Persekat	1,937	2,416	2,171	0^{1}	0 ^{1}	0^{1}	0^{1}	3,504	727	1,032	943	1,381		14,111
Persela	6,743	4,579	0^{2}	0^{2}	3,296	11,185	7,301		4,885	6,538	7,993			52,520
Persewar	781	1,814	260	205	0	0	0		0	57	52	65		3,234
Persibo	8,025	3,174	8,372	7,617	2,140	356	2,190		532	414	2,043	6,783		41,646
Persijap	1,275	700	3,000	715	1,950	0^{7}	545	8,145	8,154	8,520	8,340		8,320	49,664
Persikabo 1973	0	1,277	946	569	736	0	50	399	594	279	50			4,900
Persikas	669	601	454	481	302	414	365	356	314	425	607	312		5,300
Persikota	3,109	2,088	3,219	1,462	1,966	628	3,075	2,505	0	0	0			18,052
Persiku	5,749	3,639	4,632	5,178	2,767	5,475	983	1,643	2,679	3,909	2,958	4,132		43,744
Persipa	1,700	0^{3}	2,567	200	872	250	2,477	856	460	1,400	863	0		11,645
Persipal	6,225	7,208	8,137	3,700	5,100	5,428	8,321		837	3,440	837	972		50,205
Persipura	5,267	2,371	2,781	2,051	4,125	1,571	1,682		0^{8}	0^{8}	2,185	1,753	4,355	28,141
Persiraja	0^{4}	10,275	0 ^{5}	0^{5}	5,256	7,143	5,300	12,271	7,881	7,430	579			56,135
PSIM	9,408	8,267	7,013	9,304	5,941	5,705	6,032	7,143	4,913	7,033	11,012		15,586	97,397
PSKC	500	311	224	152	75	239	289	217	487	204	231			2,929
PSMS	1,987	2,873	2,983	0 ^{6}	0^{6}	4,000	2,468	486	847	538	578			16,760
PSPS	6,385	7,859	10,030	7,824	4,529	5,270	9,074	8,077	11,500	8,500	15,835			94,883
RANS Nusantara	2,253	0	200	352	0	50	150		100	0	75	135		3,315
Sriwijaya	4,361	2,515	4,357	5,211	2,036	1,366	779	6,350	4,281	4,653	7,221			43,130
League total														705,952

Source: Liga 2 2024–25

Notes:

1. Persekat received sanctions in the form of holding four home matches without spectators and a fine of IDR 10 million.
2. Persela received sanctions in the form of holding four home matches without spectators and a fine of IDR 10 million. Within few days, Persela appealed against the sanction and it was successfully granted so that they only received a sanction of 2 matches without spectators.
3. Persipa received sanctions in the form of holding one home match without spectators and a fine of IDR 10 million.
4. Persiraja received sanctions in the form of holding one home match without spectators and a fine of IDR 10 million.
5. Persiraja received sanctions in the form of holding four home matches without spectators and a fine of IDR 10 million. Within few days, Persiraja appealed against the sanction and it was successfully granted so that they only received a sanction of 2 matches without spectators.
6. PSMS received sanctions in the form of holding two home matches without spectators and a fine of IDR 10 million.
7. Persijap received sanctions in the form of holding one home match without spectators and a fine of IDR 12,5 million.
8. Persipura received sanctions in the form of holding two home matches without spectators and a fine of IDR 10 million.
9. Deltras received sanctions in the form of holding three home matches without spectators and a fine of IDR 125 million.

== Awards ==
=== Monthly awards ===
Month	Coach of the Month		Player of the Month		Young Player of the Month		Goal of the Month		References
Month	Coach	Club	Player	Club	Player	Club	Player	Club	References
September	(Indonesia) Regi Aditya Yonathan	Persibo	(Indonesia) Fikron Afriyanto	Persijap	(Indonesia) Muhammad Fariz	PSIM	(Mali) Makan Konaté	Persikabo 1973	
October	(Indonesia) Hanim Sugiarto	Bhayangkara Presisi	(Islamic Republic of Afghanistan) Omid Popalzay	PSPS	(Indonesia) Arlyansyah Abdulmanan	PSIM	(Indonesia) Ari Maring	Bekasi City	
November	(Indonesia) Ricardo Salampessy	Persipura	(Chad) Ezechiel N'Douassel	Persela	(Indonesia) Frengky Missa	Bhayangkara Presisi	(Indonesia) Arsan Makarin	PSPS	
December	(Indonesia) Zulkifli Syukur	Persela	(England) Deri Corfe	Persiraja	(Indonesia) Arlyansyah Abdulmanan	PSIM	(Brazil) Rafinha	PSIM	
January	(Indonesia) Erwan Hendrawanto	PSIM	(Brazil) Rafinha	PSIM	(Indonesia) Frengky Missa	Bhayangkara Presisi	(Indonesia) Dendy Sulistyawan	Bhayangkara Presisi	

== See also ==
- 2024–25 Liga 1
- 2024–25 Liga Nusantara
- 2024–25 Liga 4
