= Duta Atapelwa =

Indonesian footballer (born 2001)

Personal information
- Full name: Muhammad Duta Atapelwa
- Date of birth: 28 January 2001 (age 25)
- Place of birth: Tangerang, Indonesia
- Height: 1.82 m (6 ft 0 in)
- Positions: Centre-back; defensive midfielder

Team information
- Current team: Sumsel United
- Number: 5

Youth career
- 2016: BMIFA
- 2017–2019: Persita Tangerang
- 2019: Persib Bandung
- 2020: Persita Tangerang

Senior career*
Years	Team	Apps	(Gls)
2021–2023	Persita Tangerang	3	(0)
2023–2024	PSDS Deli Serdang	1	(0)
2024–2025	Dejan	16	(0)
2025–2026	Persiraja Banda Aceh	2	(0)
2026	Persela Lamongan	4	(0)
2026–	Sumsel United	0	(0)
- * Club domestic league appearances and goals as of 18 April 2026

Muhammad Duta Atapelwa (born 28 January 2001) is an Indonesian professional footballer who plays as a centre-back or defensive midfielder for Championship club Sumsel United.

== Club career ==
=== Persita Tangerang ===
He was signed for Persita Tangerang to play in Liga 1 in the 2021 season. Atapelwa made his first-team debut on 18 November 2021 as a substitute in a match against Bhayangkara at the Maguwoharjo Stadium, Sleman.

=== Persiraja Banda Aceh ===
In July 2025, Atapelwa joined Persiraja Banda Aceh for the 2025–26 Liga 2 season. He made two appearances for the club before being released during the mid-season transfer window in January 2026.

=== Persela Lamongan ===
In January 2026, Atapelwa joined Persela Lamongan for the remainder of the 2025–26 season during the mid-season transfer window. He made his debut for the club on 18 January 2026, coming on as a second-half substitute in a 1–1 draw against PSS Sleman.

== Career statistics ==
=== Club ===
As of 18 April 2026

Club	Season	League			Cup		Other		Total	
Club	Season	Division	Apps	Goals	Apps	Goals	Apps	Goals	Apps	Goals
Persita Tangerang	2021–22	Liga 1	3	0	0	0	0	0	3	0
PSDS Deli Serdang	2023–24	Liga 2	1	0	0	0	0	0	1	0
Dejan	2024–25	Liga 2	16	0	0	0	0	0	16	0
Persiraja Banda Aceh	2025–26	Championship	2	0	0	0	0	0	2	0
Persela Lamongan	2025–26	Championship	4	0	0	0	0	0	4	0
Career total			26	0	0	0	0	0	26	0
