= Chrystna Bhagascara =

Indonesian footballer

Personal information
- Full name: Chrystna Bhagascara
- Date of birth: 22 June 1998 (age 28)
- Place of birth: Bojonegoro, Indonesia
- Height: 1.70 m (5 ft 7 in)
- Position: Central midfielder

Team information
- Current team: Sumsel United
- Number: 16

Youth career
- 2016: ASIFA

Senior career*
Years	Team	Apps	(Gls)
2016–2017	Perssu Sumenep	11	(0)
2017–2018	PSGC Ciamis	10	(0)
2018–2019	Muba Babel United	18	(0)
2020	Putra Sinar Giri	0	(0)
2021–2022	Persekat Tegal	10	(1)
2021	→ Persis Solo (loan)	5	(0)
2022–2024	Persis Solo	26	(0)
2024–2025	Persekat Tegal	23	(1)
2025–2026	Adhyaksa	12	(1)
2026–	Sumsel United	0	(0)

International career^{‡}
2016	Indonesia U19	2	(0)
- * Club domestic league appearances and goals as of 12 April 2026 ‡ National team caps and goals as of 18 September 2016

Chrystna Bhagascara (born 22 June 1998) is an Indonesian professional footballer who plays as a central midfielder for Championship club Sumsel United.

Born in Bojonegoro, East Java, Bhagascara is a player who graduated from the ASIFA Academy and became part of the Indonesia U19 squad in the 2016 AFF U-19 Youth Championship.

== Club career ==
=== Muba Babel United ===
He was signed for Muba Babel United to play in Liga 2 in the 2019 season. Bhagascara made his league appearance on 23 June 2019, coming on as a starter in a 1–0 loss against Cilegon United at the Krakatau Steel Stadium.

=== Putra Sinar Giri ===
He was signed for Putra Sinar Giri to play in Liga 2 in the 2020 season. This season was suspended on 27 March 2020 due to the COVID-19 pandemic. The season was abandoned and was declared void on 20 January 2021.

=== Persekat Tegal ===
On 21 April 2021, Bhagascara signed a one-year contract with Liga 2 club Persekat Tegal on a free transfer. He made his league debut for Persekat Tegal when he was part of the starting lineup of a 2021–22 Liga 2 match against Badak Lampung on 27 September, in which Persekat won.

On 5 October, Bhagascara scored his first league goal for Persekat in a 1–2 loss over RANS Cilegon at the Gelora Bung Karno Madya Stadium.

== Honours ==
=== Club ===
Persis Solo

- Liga 2: 2021
