= Evo United =

Laotian football club

EVO United
- Founded: 2018
- Ground: National University of Laos Stadium; Vientiane, Laos
- Capacity: 5,000
- Manager: Valakone Phomphakdy
- League: Lao Premier League

Evo United is a football club based in Vientiane, Laos. They play in the Lao League, the top national football league in Laos.

== Players and staff ==
=== Current squad ===
As of 26 August 2019

Note: Flags indicate national team as defined under FIFA eligibility rules; some limited exceptions apply. Players may hold more than one non-FIFA nationality.

| No. | Pos. | Nation | Player |
|---|---|---|---|
| 1 | GK | LAO | Kaisone Homsin |
| 2 | DF | LAO | Thadthanon Visounnalath |
| 3 | DF | LAO | Anousith Lorvhantien |
| 4 | DF | LAO | Xaiyaphet Somphengboupha |
| 5 | DF | LAO | Kunya Khounvongsa |
| 7 | MF | NGA | Murphy Alabi Ebedi |
| 8 | MF | LAO | Vilakone Vannavong |
| 10 | MF | LAO | Daoneua Siviengxay |
| 11 | FW | CMR | David Koffi Ben |
| 12 | MF | LAO | Hudsadi Bounsavad |
| 14 | MF | LAO | Lekto Louang Aphay |
| 16 | GK | LAO | Souksavanh Sounthavong |
| 17 | MF | LAO | Anousone Homchan |
| 18 | GK | LAO | Vanna Sayyavong |
| 19 | DF | LAO | Panomphone Philavong |

| No. | Pos. | Nation | Player |
|---|---|---|---|
| 20 | MF | LAO | Saysana Keovilai |
| 22 | MF | LAO | Manolom Phomsouvanh |
| 23 | FW | LAO | Nhonghua Lansy |
| 24 | MF | LAO | Somnuek Sibounhueang |
| 25 | DF | NGA | Oliver Augustine Omewiri |
| 26 | DF | LAO | Thavadsay Keomoungkhoun |
| 29 | MF | LAO | Thitsakun Bounmalai |
| 30 | DF | LAO | Vannadeth Nuanmaniaob |
| 31 | MF | LAO | Phommasone Sangkeo |
| 33 | DF | LAO | Visay Vaenpaserth |
| 34 | MF | LAO | Khampha Toulakhom |
| 37 | MF | KOR | Lee Doo-kyo |
| 40 | DF | LAO | Phoomy Chanthalungsy |
| 48 | MF | LAO | Saysamone Phuakphasouk |
| 85 | DF | LAO | Kitthisuk Phounsavath |
