= Felipe Ryan =

Brazilian football player (born 1997)

Personal information
- Full name: Felipe Ryan Alves Silva
- Date of birth: 28 April 1997 (age 29)
- Place of birth: Brazil
- Height: 1.80 m (5 ft 11 in)
- Position: Attacking midfielder

Team information
- Current team: Sumsel United
- Number: 10

Youth career
- 2007–2013: GDR Portugal
- 2013–2015: Barreirense
- 2015–2016: Gil Vicente

Senior career*
Years	Team	Apps	(Gls)
2016–2017	Sernache	28	(2)
2017–2018	Caldas	28	(3)
2018–2019	Académico de Viseu	9	(0)
2019–2020	Real	24	(10)
2020–2022	Alverca	43	(10)
2022	PO Xylotymbou	8	(2)
2023	Varzim	3	(0)
2023–2024	Lokomotiv Sofia	2	(0)
2024	Kukësi	6	(0)
2024	Persekat Tegal	14	(4)
2025	Bhayangkara	6	(1)
2025–2026	Kendal Tornado	17	(3)
2026–	Sumsel United	6	(1)
- * Club domestic league appearances and goals as of 30 October 2026

Felipe Ryan Alves Silva (born 28 April 1997) is a Brazilian professional footballer who plays as an attacking midfielder for Championship club Sumsel United.

== Career statistics ==
=== Club ===
As of match played 2 October 2026

Appearances and goals by club, season and competition
Club	Season	League			National cup		League cup		Other		Total	
Club	Season	Division	Apps	Goals	Apps	Goals	Apps	Goals	Apps	Goals	Apps	Goals
Sernache	2016–17	Campeonato de Portugal	28	2	3	0	—		—		31	2
Caldas	2017–18	Campeonato de Portugal	28	3	8	0	—		—		36	3
Académico de Viseu	2018–19	LigaPro	9	0	0	0	0	0	—		9	0
Real S.C.	2019–20	Campeonato de Portugal	24	10	3	0	—		—		27	10
Alverca	2020–21	Campeonato de Portugal	27	10	2	0	—		—		29	10
Alverca	2021–22	Liga 3	16	0	3	0	—		2 (Note: Appearances in Liga 3 third-place play-off)	0	21	0
Alverca	Total		43	10	5	0	—		2	0	50	10
PO Xylotymbou	2022–23	Cypriot Second Division	8	2	1	0	—		—		9	2
Varzim	2022–23	Liga 3	3	0	0	0	—		0	0	3	0
Lokomotiv Sofia	2023–24	Bulgarian First League	2	0	0	0	—		—		2	0
Kukësi	2023–24	Kategoria Superiore	6	0	2	0	—		—		8	0
Persekat Tegal	2024–25	Liga 2	14	4	0	0	—		—		14	4
Bhayangkara	2024–25	Liga 2	6	1	0	0	—		—		6	1
Kendal Tornado	2025–26	Championship	17	3	0	0	—		—		17	3
Sumsel United	2026–27	Championship	2	0	0	0	—		—		2	0
Career total			190	35	22	0	0	0	2	0	214	35
