= Valakone Phomphakdy =

Laotian footballer and manager

Personal information
- Date of birth: 18 June 1966 (age 60)
- Place of birth: Laos
- Date of death: 18 January 2020 (aged 53)

Senior career*
Years	Team	Apps	(Gls)
- Yotha F.C.

Managerial career
- 2016: National University of Laos
- 2016: Laos
- 2019: EVO United
Medal record
Men's football
Representing Laos (as manager)
AFC Solidarity Cup
Bronze medal – third place	2016
- * Club domestic league appearances and goals

Valakone Phomphakdy (18 June 1966 – 18 January 2020) was a Laotian professional footballer and football manager. He played for Yotha F.C. from October 2004 until 2005 and from January until February 2011 he coached the Laos national football team.

On 18 January 2020, his current team EVO United announced his death on their Facebook page.
