= Danila Sokirchenko =

Kyrgyzstani footballer

Personal information
- Full name: Danila Anatolyevich Sokirchenko
- Date of birth: 15 October 1995 (age 31)
- Place of birth: Sretenka, Kyrgyzstan
- Height: 1.83 m (6 ft 0 in)
- Position: Defender

Senior career*
Years	Team	Apps	(Gls)
2012	FC-95 Bishkek	23	(0)
2013–2022	Abdysh-Ata Kant	106	(7)
2022–2023	Dordoi Bishkek	6	(0)
2023	Dzhalal-Abad	2	(0)
2023–2024	Alay	10	(0)
2024	Dordoi Bishkek	12	(0)
2025	Dejan	6	(0)

International career^{‡}
2016–2021	Kyrgyzstan	2	(0)
- * Club domestic league appearances and goals as of 12:55, 15 February 2025 (UTC) ‡ National team caps and goals as of 12:55, 16 September 2021 (UTC)

Danila Anatolyevich Sokirchenko (Russian: Данила Анатольевич Сокирченко; born 15 October 1995) is a Kyrgyz professional footballer who plays as a defender.

== Club career ==
On 1 August 2022, Dordoi Bishkek announced the signing of Sokirchenko on a contract until the end of the year.

== Career statistics ==
=== International ===
As of match played 16 November 2021.

Kyrgyzstan national team
Year	Apps	Goals
2016	1	0
2017	0	0
2018	0	0
2019	0	0
2020	0	0
2021	1	0
Total	2	0
