= Aleksa Andrejić =

Serbian footballer

Personal information
- Full name: Aleksa Andrejić
- Date of birth: 24 January 1993 (age 33)
- Place of birth: Kruševac, FR Yugoslavia
- Height: 1.75 m (5 ft 9 in)
- Positions: Forward; winger

Team information
- Current team: Persita Tangerang
- Number: 93

Youth career
- Čukarički

Senior career*
Years	Team	Apps	(Gls)
2011–2012	BASK	27	(8)
2012–2013	Znojmo	1	(0)
2014–2015	Baník Most	4	(0)
2016	SEKO Louny	6	(0)
2016–2017	Trayal	17	(0)
2019	Inđija	13	(0)
2019–2020	Tarxien Rainbows	18	(9)
2020–2021	Krupa	14	(0)
2021–2024	Balzan	77	(15)
2024–2025	Adhyaksa	21	(10)
2025–	Persita Tangerang	39	(12)
- * Club domestic league appearances and goals as of 25 October 2026

Aleksa Andrejić (Serbian Cyrillic: Алекса Андрејић; born 24 January 1993) is a Serbian professional footballer who plays as a forward or winger for Super League club Persita Tangerang.

== Club career ==
Born in Kruševac, Andrejić began his career at Čukarički at youth level. Then, he played for Serbian First League club BASK in 2011 season. And in 2012 season, he decided to go abroad for the first time to the Czech Republic and joined Czech National Football League side Znojmo FK. Andrejić made his league debut on 5 August 2012 as a substituted in a 0–0 draw over 1. HFK Olomouc. After four seasons in the Czech League, he decided to return to Serbia and joined clubs such as Trayal and Inđija.

=== Tarxien Rainbows ===
He was signed for Tarxien Rainbows and played in Maltese Challenge League in 2019 season. He made his league debut on 24 August 2019 as a starter in a 0–4 lose over Mosta. On 28 August 2019, Andrejić scored his first goal for Rainbows in a 4–1 away lose over Hibernians. On 9 November 2019, Andrejić scored a brace in a 3–2 lose against Gudja United. On 1 February 2020, Andrejić scored a hat-trick in a 3–2 away win against Ħamrun Spartans. In the 2019–20 season he made 18 league appearances and scored nine goals.

=== FK Krupa ===
In July 2020, Andrejić signed a contract with First League of the Republika Srpska club Krupa. He made his debut on 2 August 2020 in a match against Sarajevo, coming as a substitutes for Nikola Dujaković in 74th minute. On 20 December 2020, Andrejić officially did not renew his contract with Krupa for next season, he contributed with 14 appearances.
