= Muhammad Fariz =

Indonesian footballer

Personal information
- Date of birth: 4 September 2004 (age 22)
- Place of birth: Karanganyar, Indonesia
- Height: 1.60 m (5 ft 3 in)
- Position: Right-back

Team information
- Current team: Adhyaksa Bekasi (on loan from PSS Sleman)
- Number: 2

Youth career
- 2019–2020: Persis Solo
- 2021–2022: PSS Sleman

Senior career*
Years	Team	Apps	(Gls)
2022–	PSS Sleman	16	(0)
2023	→ Sriwijaya (loan)	0	(0)
2024–2025	→ PSIM Yogyakarta (loan)	12	(1)
2026–	→ Adhyaksa Bekasi (loan)	0	(0)
- * Club domestic league appearances and goals as of 10 January 2026

Muhammad Fariz (born 4 September 2004) is an Indonesian professional footballer who plays as a right-back for Championship club Adhyaksa Bekasi, on loan from PSS Sleman.

== Club career ==
=== PSS Sleman ===
Fariz signed for PSS Sleman to play in Liga 1 in the 2022 season. He made his professional debut on 16 December 2022 in a match against PSIS Semarang at the Manahan Stadium, Surakarta.

== Honours ==
PSIM Yogyakarta

- Liga 2: 2024–25

PSS Sleman

- Championship runner up: 2025–26
