= Rafinha (footballer, born March 1992) =

Brazilian footballer

Personal information
- Full name: Rafael de Sá Rodrigues
- Date of birth: 23 March 1992 (age 34)
- Place of birth: Recife, Brazil
- Height: 1.69 m (5 ft 7 in)
- Position: Forward

Youth career
- –2011: CFZ do Rio
- 2010: → America (loan)

Senior career*
Years	Team	Apps	(Gls)
2012–2015	Duque de Caxias	25	(0)
2014	→ Tigres do Brasil (loan)	7	(4)
2015	Mogi Mirim	3	(0)
2016	Nõmme Kalju	0	(0)
2017–2018	Mesquita	23	(11)
2019	Lao Toyota	15	(8)
2020–2021	Wat Bot City	14	(12)
2021	Chanthabouly	3	(2)
2022	Master 7	9	(10)
2022– 2023	Muang Loei United	12	(5)
2023	Master 7	7	(18)
2023–2024	PSCS Cilacap	17	(9)
2024–2025	PSIM Yogyakarta	25	(20)
2026	PSIS Semarang	12	(4)
- * Club domestic league appearances and goals as of 20 September 2026

Rafael de Sá Rodrigues (born 23 March 1992), commonly known as Rafinha, is a Brazilian professional footballer who plays as a forward.

== Career statistics ==
=== Club ===
As of 20 September 2026

Club	Season	League			State league		Cup		Other		Total	
Club	Season	Division	Apps	Goals	Apps	Goals	Apps	Goals	Apps	Goals	Apps	Goals
Duque de Caxias	2012	Série C	0	0	1 (Note: Appearances in the Campeonato Carioca)	0	0	0	0	0	1	0
Duque de Caxias	2013	Série C	5	0	9	0	0	0	1 (Note: Appearances in the Copa Rio)	0	15	0
Duque de Caxias	2014	Série C	8	0	0	0	1 (Note: Appearances in the Copa do Brasil)	1	3	0	12	1
Duque de Caxias	2015	Série D	0	0	2 (Note: Appearances in the Campeonato Carioca 2ªD)	0	0	0	0	0	7	0
Duque de Caxias	Total		13	0	12	0	1	1	4	0	30	1
Tigres do Brasil (loan)	2014	–			7	4	0	0	0	0	7	4
Mogi Mirim	2015	Série B	3	0	0	0	0	0	0	0	3	0
Mesquita	2017	–			14 (Note: Appearances in the Campeonato Carioca 3ªD)	7	0	0	0	0	6	0
Mesquita	2018	–			9	4	0	0	2	0	11	4
Mesquita	Total		0	0	23	11	0	0	2	0	25	11
Lao Toyota	2019	Lao Premier League	15	8	0	0	0	0	0	0	15	8
Wat Bot City	2020–21	Thai League 3	14	12	0	0	0	0	0	0	14	12
Master 7	2022	Lao Premier League	9	10	0	0	0	0	0	0	9	10
Muang Loei United	2022–23	Thai League 3	12	5	0	0	0	0	0	0	12	5
Master 7	2023	Lao Premier League	7	18	0	0	0	0	0	0	7	18
PSCS Cilacap	2023–24	Liga 2	17	9	0	–		0	0	0	17	9
PSIM Yogyakarta	2024–25	Liga 2	22	20	0	–		0	0	0	22	20
PSIM Yogyakarta	2025–26	Super League	3	0	0	–		0	0	0	3	0
PSIS Semarang	2025–26	Championship	10	4	0	–		0	0	0	10	4
PSIS Semarang	2026–27	Championship	2	0	0	–		0	0	0	2	0
Career total			127	86	42	15	1	1	6	0	176	102

== Honours ==
PSIM Yogyakarta

- Liga 2: 2024–25

Individual

- Liga 2 Best Player: 2024–25
