= Potsdamer Kickers =

German football club

- Full name: Potsdamer Kickers 94 e.V.
- Founded: 17 April 1994
- Ground: Sportplatz Kirschallee
- Capacity: 1,000 approx.
- Chairman: Dr. Detlef Harms
- Trainer: Michael Pasche
- League: Landesklasse Brandenburg (VIII)
- 2015–16: Kreisoberliga Havelland (IX), 1st (promoted)

The Potsdamer Kickers are a German football club based in the north of Potsdam in Brandenburg.

After the 2010–11 season and for the first time in their 17 years of existence, the Potsdamer Kickers were relegated; having started playing in the Kreisklasse, the team had slowly worked their way up through the German football league system to the Landesliga Brandenburg-Nord (VII) for the 2009–10 season, only to be relegated back to the Landesklasse after two years. In 2014 Kickers were sent back to the new Kreisoberliga (IX) but returned to the Landesklasse in 2016.

== Women's team ==
The club's women's team took part in the 2013–14 DFB-Pokal, the premier cup competition for women in Germany, and was knocked out in the first round by FC Viktoria 1889 Berlin.

== League positions since 1994–95 ==
Year	Division (Tier)	Position
1994–95	2. Kreisklasse (Havelland-Mitte) (X)	2nd
1995–96	2. Kreisklasse (Havelland-Mitte) (X)	2nd
1996–97	2. Kreisklasse (Havelland-Mitte) (X)	3rd
1997–98	2. Kreisklasse (Havelland-Mitte) (X)	1st
1998–99	1. Kreisklasse (Havelland-Mitte) (IX)	5th
1999–2000	1. Kreisklasse (Havelland-Mitte) (IX)	8th
2000–01	1. Kreisklasse (Havelland-Mitte) (IX)	10th
2001–02	1. Kreisklasse (Havelland-Mitte) (IX)	4th
2002–03	1. Kreisklasse (Havelland-Mitte) (IX)	3rd
2003–04	1. Kreisklasse (Havelland-Mitte) (IX)	1st
2004–05	Kreisliga (Havelland-Mitte) (VIII)	3rd

Year	Division (tier)	Position
2005–06	Kreisliga (Havelland-Mitte) (VIII)	1st
2006–07	Landesklasse Brandenburg-Mitte (VII)	5th
2007–08	Landesklasse Brandenburg-Mitte (VII)	4th
2008–09	Landesklasse Brandenburg-Mitte (VIII)	1st
2009–10	Landesliga Brandenburg-Nord (VII)	13th
2010–11	Landesliga Brandenburg-Nord (VII)	15th
2011–12	Landesklasse Brandenburg-Mitte (VIII)	9th
2012–13	Landesklasse Brandenburg-Mitte (VIII)	5th
2013–14	Landesklasse Brandenburg-Mitte (VIII)	12th
2014–15	Kreisoberliga Havelland (IX)	6th
2015–16	Kreisoberliga Havelland (IX)	1st
