= Werderaner FC Viktoria 1920 =

German football club

- Full name: Werderaner Fußball Club Viktoria 1920 e. V.
- Founded: 11 July 1920
- Ground: Arno-Franz-Sportplatz
- Capacity: 2,000
- Chairman: Klaus-Dieter Bartsch
- Manager: Andre Kather
- League: Brandenburg-Liga (VI)
- 2015–16: 10th

Werderaner FC Viktoria 1920 is a German football club based in Werder (Havel), Brandenburg.

== History ==
The club was established on 11 July 1920 as the football department of Brandenburger Sport Club Victoria 1889. The footballers became independent in 1923 and were active in local competition.

After World War II, sports and football clubs throughout Germany were disbanded by occupying Allied authorities. The Werder side was reestablished in 1946 as Sportgemeinschaft Vorwärts Werder and became part of the separate football competition that emerged in Soviet-occupied East Germany, playing in the Bezirksklasse Brandenburg Süd-West (III). Like other East German clubs, the team underwent frequent name changes playing as Betriebssportgemeinschaft Rat der Stadt Werder (1949), BSG Chemie Werder (1951) and BSG Werder Rotation (1953). In 1959, a number of local sports clubs were merged to create BSG Einheit Werder which included a football department.

Following German reunification, the football department again became independent as Werder Fußball Club Viktoria 1920. The current day sports club has over 450 members and the football side was part of the Landesliga Brandenburg-Nord (VII) until earning promotion to the Brandenburg-Liga in 2011, where it plays today.

== Honours ==
The club's honours:

- Landesliga Brandenburg-Nord
  - Champions: 2011
