= Sumsel United F.C. =

Indonesian football club

Sumsel United
- Full name: Sumatra Selatan United Football Club
- Nickname: The Fireball
- Short name: SSU
- Founded: 4 June 2025; 17 months ago
- Ground: Bumi Sriwijaya Stadium
- Capacity: 6,400
- Owner: PT Cahaya Sumsel United (CSU)
- President: Cik Ujang
- Manager: Syamsuddin Isaac Suryamanggala
- Coach: Mohammad Nasuha
- League: Championship
- 2025–26: 4th (1st Group)
Home colours	Away colours

Sumatra Selatan United Football Club, commonly known as Sumsel United, is an Indonesian football club based in Palembang, South Sumatra. They currently compete in the Championship.

== History ==
Sumsel United was founded after the Vice Governor of South Sumatra, Cik Ujang, took over the playing license of West Java-based Championship club, Persikas Subang. The club was ratified at the 2025 PSSI Congress on 6 June 2025.

== Players ==
=== Current squad ===
As of September 2026

Note: Flags indicate national team as defined under FIFA eligibility rules; some limited exceptions apply. Players may hold more than one non-FIFA nationality.

No.	Pos.	Nation	Player
4	DF	IDN	Razan Akbar
5	MF	IDN	Duta Atapelwa
6	MF	IDN	Tegar Pangestu
7	FW	IDN	Andreas Ado
9	FW	IDN	Dedi Hartono
10	MF	BRA	Felipe Ryan
11	FW	IDN	Kadir Toyo
14	FW	JPN	Hibiki Mochizuki
15	MF	IDN	Fajar Romadhon
16	MF	IDN	Chrystna Bhagascara
17	MF	IDN	Rizki Ramadhan (on loan from Persita Tangerang)
18	MF	IDN	Aziz Yamantoro
21	FW	IDN	Masagus Zakaria
22	FW	IDN	Tomi Darmawan
23	DF	IDN	Ragil Dimas

No.	Pos.	Nation	Player
24	GK	IDN	Maikchel Wijaya
25	DF	IDN	Frank Sokoy
26	DF	IDN	Kartika Vedhayanto
27	MF	IDN	Aidil Subhi (on loan from Persita Tangerang)
28	DF	IDN	Arif Satria
31	GK	IDN	Komang Aryantara
32	FW	NGR	Kenneth Ngwoke
34	DF	IDN	Fedly Damara
42	DF	IDN	Zakaria
47	MF	IDN	Daffa Hardi
55	DF	IDN	Wafa Habiby
64	GK	IDN	Panggih Triatmojo
78	FW	IDN	Wahyu Poru
81	GK	IDN	Ramadhan
97	FW	IDN	Pasha Andrio
99	FW	IDN	Fajar Firdaus

== Coaching staff ==
Position	Staff
Team manager	(Indonesia) Syamsuddin Isaac Suryamanggala
Head coach	(Indonesia) Mohammad Nasuha
Assistant coach	(Indonesia) Mahyadi Panggabean (Indonesia) Tony Sucipto
Goalkeeper coach	(Indonesia) Tema Mursadat
Fitness coach	(Indonesia) Andar Suhendar
Video analyst	(Indonesia) Arifin Syafril

== Season-by-season records ==
Season(s)	League	Tier	Tms.	Pos.	Piala Indonesia	I-League Cup
2025–26	Championship	2	20	4th, Group 1	–	–
2026–27	Championship	2	20	TBD	–	TBD
