= Kazuo Honma =

Japanese footballer

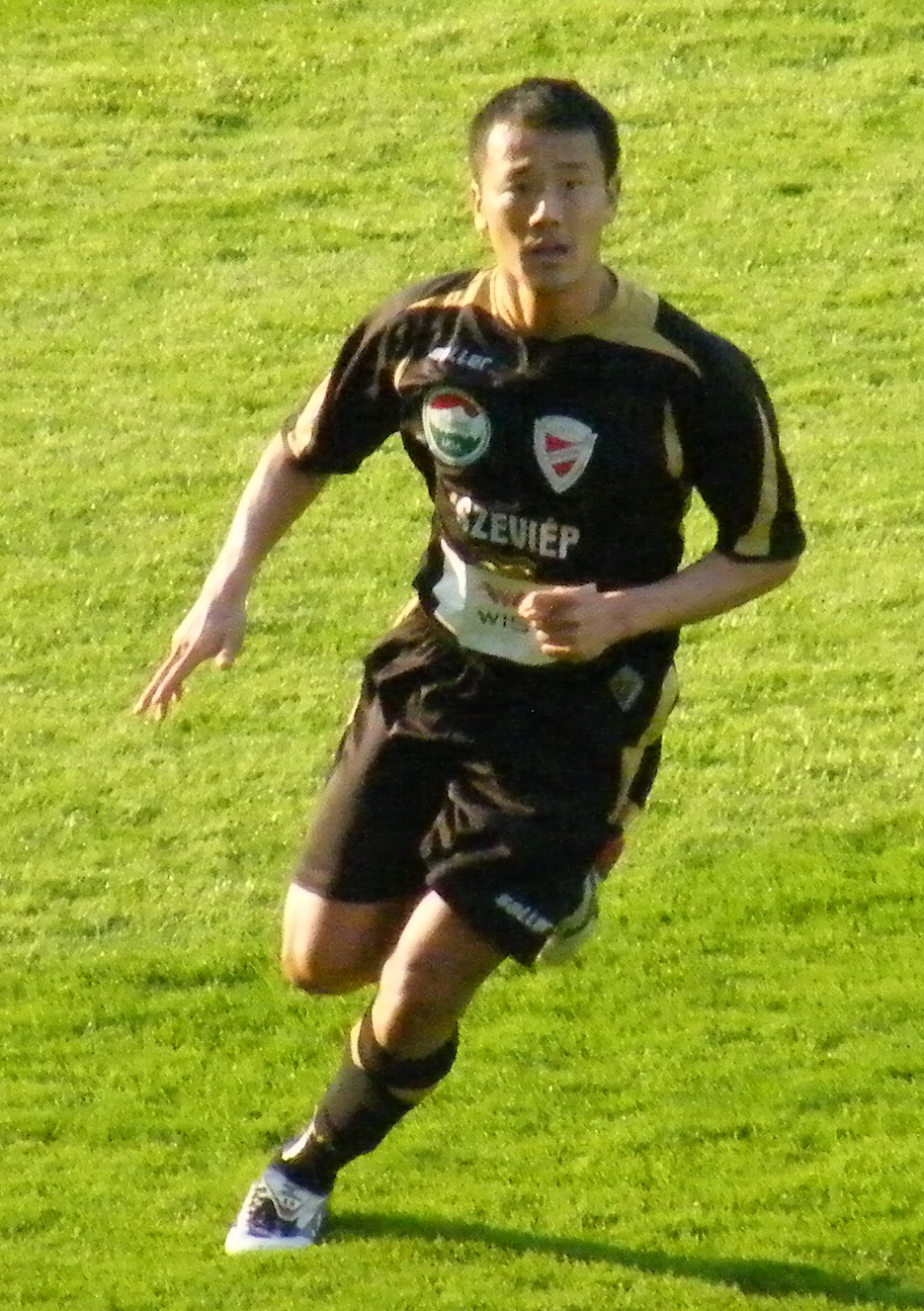
- Honma with Diósgyőri in 2009

Personal information
- Date of birth: 17 March 1980 (age 46)
- Place of birth: Yokohama, Kanagawa Prefecture, Japan
- Height: 1.75 m (5 ft 9 in)
- Position: Striker

Youth career
- 1994–1997: Omiya Higashi High School

Senior career*
Years	Team	Apps	(Gls)
1998–1999	Koshigaya FC		
2000–2001	Thespa Kusatsu		
2002–2004	Mačva Šabac		
2005	Tisza Volán		
2005–2006	Lombard-Pápa TFC	28	(4)
2007–2009	Diósgyőri VTK	43	(15)
2009–2011	Nyíregyháza	29	(8)
2010–2011	→ BFC Siófok (loan)	25	(8)
2011	Vasas SC	5	(0)
2011	Ferencvárosi TC II		
2011–2012	Ferencvárosi TC		
2012–2013	FC Veszprém	28	(15)
2014–2020	Lao Toyota		
2021	Samut Prakan	24	(10)
2022–2023	Paro	35	(67)
2023	Samut Prakan	11	(3)
2024	Paro		
- * Club domestic league appearances and goals

Kazuo Honma (also spelled Homma) (born 17 March 1980) is a Japanese professional footballer who plays as striker.

== Club career statistics ==
Season	Team	Country	Division	Apps	Goals
2001	Thespa Kusatsu	Japan	5		
2002–03	Mačva Šabac	Serbia and Montenegro	2		
2003–04	Mačva Šabac	Serbia and Montenegro	2		
2004–05	Tisza Volán	Hungary	2		
2005–06	Lombard-Pápa TFC	Hungary	1	16	3
2006–07	Lombard-Pápa TFC	Hungary	2	12	1
2007–08	Diósgyőri VTK	Hungary	1	13	7
2008–09	Diósgyőri VTK	Hungary	1	30	8
2009–10	Nyíregyháza Spartacus	Hungary	1	29	8
2010–11	BFC Siófok	Hungary	1	25	8
2011–12	Vasas SC	Hungary	1	5	0
2011–12	Ferencvárosi TC	Hungary	1		
2012–13	FC Veszprém	Hungary	2	28	15
2014–20	Lao Toyota	Laos	1		
2021–22	Samut Prakan	Thailand	3	24	10
2022–23	Paro	Bhutan	1	35	67
