= Persikotas Nusantara F.C. =

Indonesian football club

Persikotas Nusantara
- Full name: Persatuan Sepakbola Indonesia Kota Tasikmalaya Nusantara Football CLub
- Nickname: Laskar Wiradadaha
- Short name: PNFC
- Founded: 30 May 2022; 4 years ago as Nusantara United; 11 August 2025; 13 months ago as Nusantara Lampung; 30 July 2026; 2 months ago as Persikotas Nusantara
- Ground: Wiradadaha Stadium, Tasikmalaya, West Java, Indonesia
- Capacity: 10,000
- Chairman: Ecep Suwardaniyasa
- League: Liga Nusantara
- 2025–26: Liga Nusantara/Regular Round (Group A), 3rd
Home colours	Away colours

Persatuan Sepakbola Indonesia Kota Tasikmalaya Nusantara Football Club, commonly known as Persikotas Nusantara or previously known as Nusantara Lampung, is an Indonesian football club based in Tasikmalaya, West Java. They will compete in the Liga Nusantara.

== History ==
The club was established as Mataram Utama Football Club in May 2022, after Mataram Utama management handed over control to a group of investors who subsequently rebranded the club as Nusantara United Football Club. Mataram Utama still exist, deciding to focus on youth development and their football academy.

On 5 July 2022, in an Instagram post unveiling their new logo, Nusantara United announced that they will represent Nusantara, the future new capital of Indonesia, within the country's footballing pyramid. While the new Capital City of Nusantara in development, Nusantara United has determined to choose Salatiga as a temporary homebase and training camp ahead of the 2022–23 season. However, as the Kridanggo Stadium in Salatiga does not fulfil the necessary requirements to hold Liga 2 matches, Nusantara United plays their league games at the Moch. Soebroto Stadium in nearby Magelang for the 2022–23 season and at the Kebo Giro Stadium in nearby Boyolali for the 2023–24 season and holds their training sessions and operates their day-to-day activities in Banyudono, Boyolali.

Ahead of the 2025–26 season, the club relocated its home base to Bandar Lampung, Lampung and officially changed its name to Nusantara Lampung Football Club.

Ahead of the 2026–27 season, the club license to play in Liga Nusantara was acquired by Persikotas Tasikmalaya, and the club changed its name to Persikotas Nusantara Football Club.

== Players ==
=== Current squad ===
As of October 2026

Note: Flags indicate national team as defined under FIFA eligibility rules; some limited exceptions apply. Players may hold more than one non-FIFA nationality.

No.	Pos.	Nation	Player
1	GK	IDN	Daffa Daem
2	DF	IDN	Zidhan Putra
4	DF	IDN	Dodi Irawan
6	MF	IDN	Rizki Arohman
7	MF	IDN	Faisal Adnin
8	MF	IDN	Albelard Tegar
9	FW	IDN	Serdy Ephyfano
10	FW	IDN	Aqsal Mustafa
11	FW	IDN	Rio Rizki Herimukti
12	DF	IDN	Adi Setiawan
13	FW	IDN	Aditya Wedantara
15	FW	IDN	Rido Kurniawan
17	FW	IDN	Difa Zanuar
19	DF	IDN	Abiyyu Barikli
20	GK	IDN	Surya Rizky Saputra
21	MF	IDN	Drey Panyalay
22	FW	IDN	Dzikri Hidayat
23	DF	IDN	Akmal Palamani
24	DF	IDN	Muselih Agil
25	DF	IDN	Fadhil Aksah

No.	Pos.	Nation	Player
26	MF	IDN	Dharma Saputra
27	FW	IDN	Adika Ardhiswara
28	DF	IDN	Wahyu Pratama
29	DF	IDN	Didik Setyawan
31	DF	IDN	Aji Restu
52	GK	IDN	Govindra Ryzaqa
58	MF	IDN	Adi Purnama
87	FW	IDN	Habib Ausoni
—	DF	IDN	Arya Pratama
—	DF	IDN	Fahmi Ardianshya
—	DF	IDN	Iswahyudi Ardinata
—	DF	IDN	Reza Fahlevi
—	DF	IDN	Wawan Sumadi
—	MF	IDN	Andi Sopian
—	MF	IDN	Aziz Fathahilah
—	MF	IDN	Boateng Prince
—	MF	IDN	Eros Dermawan
—	MF	IDN	Muhammad Mishbah
—	MF	IDN	Nevy Duaramury
—	MF	IDN	Reza Zuhro
—	FW	IDN	Dafa Pratama
—	FW	IDN	Donald Bissa

== Coaching staff ==
Position	Name
President	(Indonesia) Arie Nanda Djausal
Head coach	(Indonesia) Ismed Sofyan
Assistant coach	(Indonesia) Richi Anshori
Goalkeeper coach	(Indonesia) M. Farid Ridwan

== Season by season records ==
=== As Mataram Utama ===
Season	League/Division	Tms.	Pos.	Piala Indonesia
2021–22	Liga 3	64	Semi-finalist	–

=== As Nusantara United ===
Season	League/Division	Tms.	Pos.	Piala Indonesia
2022–23	Liga 2	28	did not finish	–
2023–24	Liga 2	28	1st, Relegation round	–
2024–25	Liga 2	26	3rd, Relegation round	–

=== As Nusantara Lampung ===
Season	League/Division	Tms.	Pos.	Piala Indonesia
2025–26	Liga Nusantara	24	3rd, Group A	–

=== As Persikotas Nusantara ===
Season	League/Division	Tms.	Pos.	Piala Indonesia
2026–27	Liga Nusantara	24	TBD	–

== Affiliated clubs ==
- (Singapore) Lion City Sailors
- (Singapore) Balestier Khalsa
- (Philippines) Davao Aguilas
- (Laos) Master 7

== Logo history ==
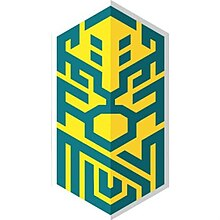
Nusantara United (2022–2025)

Nusantara Lampung (2025–2026)
