= List of Persib Bandung players =

This is a list of people who have played for the Indonesian professional football club Persib Bandung.

== Foreign players ==
Europe

- (Poland) Maciej Dołęga (2003)
- (Poland) Piotr Orliński (2003)
- (Poland) Mariusz Mucharski (2003)
- (Poland) Paweł Bocian (2003)
- (Romania) Leo Chițescu (2008)
- (Montenegro) Miljan Radović (2011–2012)
- (Montenegro) Zdravko Dragićević (2011)
- (Montenegro) Vladimir Vujović (2014–2017)
- (Montenegro) Ilija Spasojević (2015)
- (Spain) Juan Belencoso (2016)
- (England) Carlton Cole (2017)
- (Serbia) Bojan Mališić (2018–2019)
- (Slovenia) Rene Mihelič (2019)
- (Netherlands) Kevin van Kippersluis (2019)
- (Netherlands) Nick Kuipers (2019–2025)
- (Netherlands) Geoffrey Castillion (2020–2021)
- (Italy) Stefano Beltrame (2023–2024)
- (Spain) Alberto Rodríguez (2023–2024)
- (Spain) Tyronne del Pino (2023–2025)
- (Croatia) Mateo Kocijan (2024–2025)

South America

- (Chile) Rodrigo Sanhueza (2003)
- (Chile) Claudio Lizama (2003–2004)
- (Chile) Alejandro Tobar (2003–2004)
- (Chile) Rodrigo Lemunao (2003)
- (Chile) Julio Lopez (2004)
- (Chile) Angelo Espinosa (2004)
- (Uruguay) Adrián Colombo (2004)
- (Paraguay) Osvaldo Moreno (2004)
- (Chile) Cristian Molina (2004)
- (Brazil) Antônio Cláudio (2005–2006)
- (Brazil) Uilian Souza (2005)
- (Chile) Patricio Jiménez (2007–2008)
- (Paraguay) Lorenzo Cabanas (2007–2009)
- (Brazil) Fábio Lopes (2008)
- (Brazil) Rafael Bastos (2008–2009)
- (Brazil) Hilton Moreira (2008–2011, 2013)
- (Uruguay) (Indonesia) Cristian Gonzáles (2009–2011)
- (Paraguay) Christian René Martínez (2009–2010)
- (Argentina) Pablo Francés (2010)
- (Brazil) Márcio Souza (2012)
- (Argentina) Robertino Pugliara (2016)
- (Argentina) Marcos Flores (2016)
- (Argentina) Jonatan Bauman (2018)
- (Brazil) (Indonesia) Fabiano Beltrame (2019–2021)
- (Brazil) Wander Luiz (2020–2021)
- (Brazil) Bruno Cantanhede (2022)
- (Brazil) David da Silva (2021–2025)
- (Brazil) Ciro Alves (2022–2025)
- (Brazil) Gustavo França (2024–2025)

Africa

- (Nigeria) Ekene Ikenwa (2005)
- (Nigeria) Chioma Kingsley (2005)
- (Morocco) Redouane Barkaoui (2006–2008)
- (Cameroon) Ayock Berty (2006)
- (Burkina Faso) Brahima Traoré (2006)
- (Cameroon) Nyeck Nyobe (2007, 2008–2009)
- (Cameroon) Christian Bekamenga (2007–2008)
- (Cameroon) Abanda Herman (2011–2013)
- (Ghana) Moses Sakyi (2011)
- (Cameroon) (Indonesia) Herman Dzumafo (2013)
- (Cameroon) Mbida Messi (2013)
- (Mali) Makan Konaté (2014–2015)
- (Mali) Djibril Coulibaly (2014)
- (Ghana) Michael Essien (2017)
- (Chad) Ezechiel N'Douassel (2017-2019)
- (Gabon) Lévy Madinda (2023)
- (Cape Verde) Mailson Lima (2024)

Asia

- (Thailand) Pradit Taweechai (2005–2006)
- (Thailand) Nipont Chanarwut (2006)
- (Thailand) Sinthaweechai Hathairattanakool (2006, 2009)
- (Thailand) Suchao Nuchnum (2009)
- (Japan) (Philippines) Satoshi Ōtomo (2010)
- (Singapore) Baihakki Khaizan (2010)
- (Singapore) Shahril Ishak (2010)
- (Japan) Shohei Matsunaga (2011, 2017)
- (Australia) Robert Gaspar (2011–2012)
- (Singapore) Noh Alam Shah (2012)
- (Syria) Naser Al Sebai (2013)
- (Japan) Kenji Adachihara (2013)
- (Australia) Diogo Ferreira (2016)
- (South Korea) Oh In-Kyun (2018)
- (Turkmenistan) Artur Geworkýan (2019)
- (Philippines) Omid Nazari (2019–2021)
- (Afghanistan) Farshad Noor (2021)
- (Palestine) Mohammed Bassim (2021–2022)
- (Philippines) Daisuke Sato (2022–2024)
- (Philippines) Kevin Ray Mendoza (2023–2025)

== Indonesian players ==
- Max Timisela
- Anas Wiradikarta
- Kwee Kiat Sek
- Aang Witarsa
- Sunar
- Jahja
- Aten
- Sunarnoyo
- Emen Suwarman
- Sharunah
- Willy Ang Ching Siang
- Hafid Sijaya Hasan
- Sunarto
- Fattah Hidayat
- Rukma Sudjana
- Wowo Sunaryo
- Omo Suratmo
- Hengki Timisela
- Djadjang Nurdjaman
- Robby Darwis
- Sutiono Lamso
- Yusuf Bachtiar
- Anwar Sanusi
- Yudi Guntara
- Suwandi Siswoyo
- Budiman Yunus
- Peri Sandria
- Ansyari Lubis
- Nandang Kurnaedi
- Muhammad Halim
- Imam Riyadi
- Yaris Riyadi
- Imran Nahumarury
- Nur'Alim
- Gendut Doni
- Alexander Pulalo
- Aliyudin
- Yandri Pitoy
- Budi Sudarsono
- Isnan Ali
- Harry Saputra
- Charis Yulianto
- Bayu Sutha
- Muhammad Ilham
- Nova Arianto
- Muhammad Ridwan
- Maman Abdurahman
- Eka Ramdani
- Airlangga Sutjipto
- Jajang Sukmara
- Mohammad Nasuha
- Cristian Gonzáles
- Sergio van Dijk
- Muhammad Taufiq
- Tantan
- Samsul Arif
- I Made Wirawan
- Firman Utina
- Atep
- Hariono
- Zaenal Arief
- Supardi Nasir
- Markus Horison
- Achmad Jufriyanto
- Zulkifli Syukur
- Tony Sucipto
- Abdul Rahman
- Ferdinand Sinaga
- Zulham Zamrun
- Yandi Sofyan
- Dedi Kusnandar
- Kim Jeffrey Kurniawan
- Muhammad Natshir
- Yanto Basna
- Gian Zola
- Febri Haryadi
- Raphael Maitimo
- Henhen Herdiana
- Victor Igbonefo

=== Only played in junior squad ===
- Jajang Mulyana
- Hanif Sjahbandi
- Ryuji Utomo
- Sutanto Tan
- I Nyoman Adi Parwa
- Abdul Aziz
- Andritany Ardhiyasa
- Johan Juansyah
