= Julio César Armentia =

Argentine footballer

Personal information
- Date of birth: 2 August 1974 (age 52)
- Place of birth: San Cayetano, Buenos Aires, Argentina
- Height: 1.77 m (5 ft 10 in)
- Position: Goalkeeper

Youth career
- Independiente San Cayetano
- 1990–1991: Necochea (partido team)

Senior career*
Years	Team	Apps	(Gls)
1989–1991	Independiente San Cayetano		
1992–1994	Jorge Newbery Lobería		
1994–1995	Sarmiento		
1995–1996	Cúcuta Deportivo		
1997	Ñublense		
1998	Cobreloa	0	(0)
1998–2000	O'Higgins	63	(0)
2001	Universidad de Concepción		
2001	Atlante	0	(0)
2002	Acapulco	17	(0)
2002–2003	San José	22	(0)
2003–2004	Cipolletti	1	(0)
2005	Alumni Villa María		
2005	Unión Central Villa María		
2005	Jorge Newbery Lobería		
2006	Villa del Parque Necochea		
2006	Independiente Lobería		
2007–2011	Rivadavia Necochea		
2012	Independiente Lobería		

Managerial career
- 2006–2013: CAI Lobería (youth)
- San Manuel
- * Club domestic league appearances and goals

Julio César Armentia (born 2 August 1974) is an Argentine former professional footballer who played as a goalkeeper.

== Career ==
Armentía was born in San Cayetano, Buenos Aires, Argentina. In his homeland, he played at minor categories for clubs such as Jorge Newbery from Lobería, Sarmiento, Alumni de Villa María, Villa del Parque from Necochea, among others.

In Colombia, he played for Cúcuta Deportivo, winning the 1995–96 Primera B.

In Chile, he played for Ñublense, Cobreloa, O'Higgins and Universidad de Concepción in both the Primera División and the Primera B. As a member of O'Higgins, he got promotion to the 1999 Primera División after being the runner-up in the 1998 Primera B alongside players such as Darío Gálvez, Alejandro Tobar, Mario Núñez, Iván Sepúlveda, among others.

In Mexico, he was a member of Atlante in the Liga MX and Acapulco in the Ascenso MX.

In Bolivia, he played for San José in the top division.

== Post-retirement ==
Armentía has worked as a fitness and goalkeeping coach. As a football coach, he has led Club Atlético San Manuel.
