= Jaime González (Chilean footballer) =

Chilean footballer (born 1977)

Personal information
- Full name: Jaime Camilo González Vidal
- Date of birth: 15 April 1977 (age 49)
- Place of birth: San Antonio, Chile
- Height: 1.80 m (5 ft 11 in)
- Position: Forward

Youth career
- O'Higgins

Senior career*
Years	Team	Apps	(Gls)
1998–1999	O'Higgins	61	(32)
2000	Colo-Colo	4	(3)
2000–2002	Bari	0	(0)
2001–2002	→ Universidad Católica (loan)	34	(6)
2003	Cobreloa	39	(11)
2004–2006	Audax Italiano	79	(18)
2007–2008	Huachipato	55	(13)
Total		272	(83)

Managerial career
- 2011: San Antonio Unido
- * Club domestic league appearances and goals

Jaime Camilo González Vidal (born 15 April 1977) is a former Chilean professional footballer who played as a forward for clubs in his country and for Bari in Italy. He has been coach of San Antonio Unido.

== Career ==
A product of O'Higgins, as a member of the 1998 squad, he got promotion to the 1999 Primera División after being the runner-up in the Primera B alongside players such as Darío Gálvez, Alejandro Tobar, Danilo Miranda, Iván Sepúlveda, among others.

Between 2001 and 2002, he played on loan at Universidad Católica from Bari.

In 2011, he worked as manager of San Antonio Unido in the Chilean Tercera A.

== Honours ==
Universidad Católica

- Primera División de Chile: 2002 Apertura

Cobreloa

- Primera División de Chile: 2003 Apertura, 2003 Clausura
