= Pedro Rivera (footballer) =

Chilean footballer (born 1976)

Personal information
- Full name: Pedro Rubén Rivera Porra
- Date of birth: 27 September 1976 (age 50)
- Place of birth: Coínco, Chile
- Height: 1.83 m (6 ft 0 in)
- Position: Defender

Team information
- Current team: Universidad Católica (youth) (coach)

Senior career*
Years	Team	Apps	(Gls)
1996–2002	O'Higgins	146	(9)
2002–2003	Cobresal	56	(4)
2004–2006	Universidad de Concepción	99	(7)
2007	Everton	12	(0)
2007	Coquimbo Unido	8	(0)
2008	Ñublense	26	(2)
2009–2010	Santiago Morning	23	(0)
2011	Magallanes	15	(0)
Total		385	(22)

Managerial career
- 2011–2022: Magallanes (youth)
- 2015: Magallanes (interim)
- 2016–2017: Magallanes (interim)
- 2023–: Universidad Católica (youth)
- * Club domestic league appearances and goals

Pedro Rubén Rivera Porra (born 27 September 1976) is a Chilean football manager and former player who played as a defender. He currently works in the Universidad Católica youth system. .

== Playing career ==
A product of O'Higgins, as a member of the 1998 squad, he got promotion to the 1999 Primera División after being the runner-up in the 1998 Primera B alongside players such as Darío Gálvez, Alejandro Tobar, Danilo Miranda, Iván Sepúlveda, among others.

In the Chilean Primera División, he also played for Cobresal, Universidad de Concepción, Everton, Coquimbo Unido, Ñublense and Santiago Morning.

In the Primera B de Chile, he also played for Magallanes in 2011, his last club.

== Coaching career ==
Rivera graduated as a football manager at INAF (National Football Institute) and has worked in the Magallanes youth system. In 2015 and 2016, he assumed as interim coach of the first team.

In 2023, he switched to the Universidad Católica youth system.
