= Germán Osorio =

Chilean footballer

Personal information
- Full name: Germán Jesús Osorio Ramírez
- Date of birth: 16 May 1974 (age 52)
- Place of birth: Chile
- Position: Forward

Youth career
- Universidad de Chile

Senior career*
Years	Team	Apps	(Gls)
1994–1996	Universidad de Chile		
1994	→ Deportes Concepción (loan)	17	(6)
1995	→ Deportes La Serena (loan)	6	(0)
1996	Real Zacatecas		(1)
1997	Deportes Temuco	3	(1)
1998	Deportes Linares		(5)
1999	Deportes Melipilla		(12)
2000	Coquimbo Unido	3	(0)
2003–2004	PSIS Semarang		(5)

International career
2009	Chile (beach soccer)		
- * Club domestic league appearances and goals

Germán Jesús Osorio Ramírez (born 16 May 1974) is a Chilean former professional football forward who played for clubs in Chile, Mexico, and Indonesia.

== Career ==
A product of Universidad de Chile, Osorio made his debut in the 1994 Copa Chile and scored a goal against Unión San Felipe. In the Chilean Primera División, he also played for Deportes La Serena, Deportes Temuco and Coquimbo Unido.

In the Chilean second division, he played for Deportes Concepción, with whom he won the league title in 1994, Deportes Linares and Deportes Melipilla.

Abroad, he had stints with Real Sociedad Zacatecas in Mexico and PSIS Semarang in Indonesia.

== Post-retirement ==
Osorio represented the Chile beach soccer team in the 2009 South American Championship, alongside retired professional footballers such as Rodrigo Cuevas, Rodrigo Sanhueza, Cristian Olivares, Jorge Torres and Carlos Medina, with Miguel Ángel Gamboa as coach. Previously, he had taken part of a team from SIFUP, the trade union of professional football players in Chile, alongside players such as Esteban Valencia, Ignacio Parra, Patricio Correa and Francisco Bozán.

He graduated as a football manager at INAF (National Football Institute) in 2009, alongside fellows such as Dante Poli, José Luis Sierra, Pedro Reyes, among others. Subsequently, he started the Escuela de Fútbol Lo Valledor, a football academy to help the children from surrounding neighborhoods to Lo Valledor market in Pedro Aguirre Cerda commune.
