= Cristian Olivares (footballer, born 1976) =

Chilean footballer

Personal information
- Full name: Cristian Andrés Olivares López
- Date of birth: 23 May 1976 (age 50)
- Place of birth: Antofagasta, Chile
- Height: 1.68 m (5 ft 6 in)
- Position: Attacking midfielder

Youth career
- Deportes Antofagasta

Senior career*
Years	Team	Apps	(Gls)
1994	Deportes Antofagasta	0	(0)
1995–1999	Magallanes		
1999	Coquimbo Unido	16	(1)
2000	Colo-Colo	0	(0)
2000–2001	Coquimbo Unido	29	(1)
2002	Deportes Temuco	19	(0)
2003	Deportes Antofagasta		
2004	Persekabpas Pasuruan		(1)
2005	Petrokimia Putra		(4)
2006–2007	Persema Malang		(5)

International career
2008–2010	Chile (beach soccer)		
2010	Chile (futsal)		
- * Club domestic league appearances and goals

Cristian Andrés Olivares López (born 23 May 1976) is a Chilean former professional footballer who played as an attacking midfielder for clubs in Chile and Indonesia. He also was a Chile international beach soccer and futsal player.

== Club career ==
A product of Deportes Antofagasta youth system, he played for Magallanes from 1995 to 1999, winning the 1995 Tercera División.

After a stint with Coquimbo Unido in 1999, he joined Colo-Colo in 2000. Despite he made appearances in friendly matches and the Copa Gato during the preseason, he made no appearances in the league. Then he returned to Coquimbo Unido until 2001, playing after for Deportes Temuco and Deportes Antofagasta.

Abroad, he played in Indonesia between 2004 and 2007 for Persekabpas Pasuruan, Petrokimia Putra and Persema Malang.

== International career ==
Following his retirement as a football player, he represented the Chile beach soccer team in both the 2008 and the 2009 South American Championships, alongside retired professional footballers such as Rodrigo Sanhueza, Rodrigo Cuevas, Jorge Torres, Germán Osorio and Carlos Medina, with Miguel Ángel Gamboa as coach. In 2010, he also won the XI Copa Latina.

In 2010, he also represented the Chile futsal team in the South American Games, while he was a futsal player of Unión Española.

== Post-retirement ==
Olivares graduated as a PE teacher at the Alberto Hurtado University and has spent time as futsal and football coach, teacher and sports assistant at the same university as well as other institutions such as Andrés Bello University and football academies.

He has taken part of matches for "Colo-Colo de Todos los Tiempos", a team made up by former players of Colo-Colo.

== Personal life ==
He is the older brother of Richard Olivares, who also played for Magallanes, Deportes Temuco, Deportes Antofagasta and Coquimbo Unido.

He was nicknamed Chico (Little) due to his height.

== Honours ==
=== Club ===
Magallanes

- Tercera División de Chile: 1995

Chile (beach soccer)

- Copa Latina: 2010

=== Individual ===
- Best Amateur Player of the Season: 1995
