= Danilo Miranda =

Chilean footballer (born 1977)

Personal information
- Full name: Danilo Alejandro Miranda Araya
- Date of birth: 2 September 1977 (age 49)
- Place of birth: Machalí, Chile
- Position: Midfielder

Youth career
- O'Higgins

Senior career*
Years	Team	Apps	(Gls)
1996–2003	O'Higgins	133	(19)
2004	Rangers	5	(0)
2004–2005	Cobresal	47	(2)
2006	Ñublense		
2007	Kelantan		

International career
1997	Chile U20	5	(0)
- * Club domestic league appearances and goals

Danilo Alejandro Miranda Araya (born 2 September 1977) is a Chilean former footballer who played as a midfielder.

== Career ==
A product of O'Higgins youth system, Miranda made his debut in the 1996 season in the top division and stayed with them until 2003. As a member of the 1998 squad, he got promotion to the 1999 Primera División after being the runner-up in the 1998 Primera B alongside players such as Darío Gálvez, Alejandro Tobar, Mauricio Dinamarca, Iván Sepúlveda, among others.

After, he played for Rangers de Talca (2004), Cobresal (2004–05), Ñublense (2006) and Malaysian side Kelantan (2007).

At international level, he represented Chile at under-20 level in the 1997 South American Championship, making five appearances.

== Post-retirement ==
Miranda went on playing football at amateur level for clubs such as República del Chile and Viejos Crack Santa Filomena from Rancagua, Chile.
