= Rodrigo Cuevas =

Chilean footballer (born 1973)

Personal information
- Full name: Rodrigo Eduardo Cuevas González
- Date of birth: 18 September 1973 (age 53)
- Place of birth: Quintero, Chile
- Position: Goalkeeper

Youth career
- Quintero Unido
- Santiago Wanderers

Senior career*
Years	Team	Apps	(Gls)
1992–2000	Santiago Wanderers		
1998	→ Santiago Morning (loan)		
2001	Fernández Vial		
2001–2003	Santiago Morning		
2004	Mitra Kukar		
2005	Unión San Felipe		

International career
1994	Chile U23 B		
2008–2010	Chile (beach soccer)		
- * Club domestic league appearances and goals

Rodrigo Eduardo Cuevas González (born 18 September 1973 in Quintero) is a Chilean former footballer who played as a goalkeeper.

== Career ==
Cuevas played for Chilean clubs Santiago Wanderers (1994–1997 and 2000), Santiago Morning (1998–1999 and 2001–2004) and Unión San Felipe (2005).

At international level, he took part of a Chile national under-23 squad made up by players from the Segunda División.

Following his retirement as a football player, he represented the Chile beach soccer team in both the 2008 and the 2009 South American Championships, alongside retired professional footballers such as Rodrigo Sanhueza, Germán Osorio, Cristian Olivares, Jorge Torres and Carlos Medina, with Miguel Ángel Gamboa as coach. In 2010, he also won the XI Copa Latina.

== Honours ==
Santiago Wanderers

- Segunda División: 1995

Chile (beach soccer)

- Copa Latina: 2010
