= Ignacio Parra =

Chilean footballer (born 1985)

Personal information
- Full name: Ignacio Alonso Parra Román
- Date of birth: 5 July 1985 (age 41)
- Place of birth: Chile
- Position: Midfielder

Youth career
- Unión Española

Senior career*
Years	Team	Apps	(Gls)
2002–2007	Unión Española	24	(1)
2004	→ Deportes Melipilla (loan)		
2005	→ Fernández Vial (loan)		
2007	→ Trasandino (loan)		
2008	CSM Focșani		
2009	Palestino	9	(0)
2010	Deportes Copiapó	7	(0)
2011	Junior		
2012	Provincial Osorno	17	(2)
- * Club domestic league appearances and goals

Ignacio Alonso Parra Román (born 5 July 1985) is a Chilean former professional footballer who played as a midfielder for clubs in Chile and Romania.

== Career ==
A product of Unión Española youth system, Parra coincided with players such as Gabriel Vilches, Alexis Norambuena, Roberto Órdenes, among athers. He made his professional debut in 2002. In the Chilean Primera División, he also played for Palestino.

In his homeland, he also played for Deportes Melipilla, Fernández Vial, Trasandino, Deportes Copiapó and Provincial Osorno. As a member of Deportes Melipilla, he won the league title of the Primera B in 2004.

Abroad, he had a stint with Romanian side CSM Focșani in 2008 and a brief stint with Colombian side Junior in 2011.

== Post-retirement ==
In 2008, Parra took part of a beach soccer team from SIFUP, the trade union of professional football players in Chile, alongside players such as Esteban Valencia, Germán Osorio, Patricio Correa and Francisco Bozán.

== Honours ==
Deportes Melipilla

- Primera B de Chile: 2004
