= Rodrigo Lemunao =

Chilean footballer (born 1978)

Personal information
- Full name: Rodrigo Andrés Lemunao Torres
- Date of birth: 26 September 1978 (age 48)
- Place of birth: Santiago, Chile
- Height: 1.80 m (5 ft 11 in)
- Positions: Attacking midfielder; forward

Youth career
- Palestino

Senior career*
Years	Team	Apps	(Gls)
1996–1999	Palestino	7	(0)
1999	→ Fernández Vial (loan)		(0)
2000	Fernández Vial		(0)
2002	Rangers	9	(0)
2003–2004	Persib Bandung		
2005	Deportes Copiapó	26	(8)
2007	Provincial Osorno		
- * Club domestic league appearances and goals

Rodrigo Andrés Lemunao Torres (born 26 September 1978) is a Chilean former professional footballer who played as an attacking midfielder or forward for clubs in Chile and Indonesia.

== Career ==
A product of Palestino youth system, Lemunao made appearances for the first team in 1997 and 1998.

In Chile, he also played for Fernández Vial, Rangers de Talca, Deportes Copiapó and Provincial Osorno.

Abroad, he played in Indonesia for Persib Bandung in 2003–04, where he coincided with compatriots such as Claudio Lizama, Alejandro Tobar and the coach Juan Páez.

== Personal life ==
Lemunao is of Mapuche descent. His surname means "mountain lion" or "puma".

In 2018, he was involved in legal issues in Buenos Aires, Argentina.
