= Esteban Valencia (footballer, born 1972) =

Chilean footballer and manager

Personal information
- Full name: Esteban Andrés Valencia Bascuñán
- Date of birth: 8 January 1972 (age 54)
- Place of birth: Santiago, Chile
- Height: 1.66 m (5 ft 5 in)
- Position: Midfielder

Team information
- Current team: Deportes Temuco (women) (manager)

Youth career
- 1982–1990: Universidad de Chile

Senior career*
Years	Team	Apps	(Gls)
1991–1999	Universidad de Chile	196	(26)
1993	→ Provincial Osorno (loan)	27	(5)
2000–2001	Colón	39	(3)
2001	Deportes Puerto Montt	7	(0)
2002	Palestino	35	(9)
2003–2004	Universidad Católica	27	(2)
2004	Palestino	17	(0)
2004–2006	Universidad de Chile	50	(3)
2007–2008	Persegi Bali	–	(–)
Total		398	(48)

International career
1994–2001	Chile	48	(3)
2008	Chile (beach soccer)		

Managerial career
- 2012–2023: Universidad de Chile (youth)
- 2018: Universidad de Chile (interim)
- 2021: Universidad de Chile (interim)
- 2021: Universidad de Chile
- 2024–: Deportes Temuco (youth)
- 2024: Deportes Temuco (interim)
- 2025: Deportes Temuco (women)
- 2025: Deportes Temuco
- 2026–: Deportes Temuco (women)
- * Club domestic league appearances and goals

Esteban Andrés Valencia Bascuñán (born 8 January 1972) is a Chilean football manager and former player who played as a midfielder. He is currently in charge of Deportes Temuco (women).

== Club career ==
A historical player of Universidad de Chile, in Chile he also played for Provincial Osorno, Deportes Puerto Montt, Palestino and Universidad Católica.

Abroad he played for Colón in Argentina and Persegi Bali in Indonesia at the end of his career, where he faced other Chilean players such as Francisco Rotunno.

== International career ==
Nicknamed "Huevito" (Little Egg), Valencia obtained a total number of 48 caps for the Chile national football team, scoring three goals between 1994 and 2001. He made his full international debut on 30 April 1994.

Following his return from Indonesia in 2008, he represented the Chile beach soccer team in the South American Championship, alongside retired professional footballers such as Rodrigo Cuevas, Rodrigo Sanhueza, Jorge Torres and Carlos Medina, with Miguel Ángel Gamboa as coach.

== Managerial career ==
After working in the Universidad de Chile youth system, in 2021 he took the challenge of managing the first team as a caretaker after Rafael Dudamel was released. Later, he was confirmed until the end of the 2021 season. After this experience, he assumed as Technical Coordinator for the youth system.

In 2024, Valencia assumed as coach for the reserve team of Deportes Temuco. On 20 October of the same year, he assumed as interim coach of the first team.

In 2026, Valencia assumed as coach of the Deportes Temuco women's team.

== Personal life ==
He is the father of the professional footballer Esteban Valencia Reyes.

== Honours ==
=== Player ===
Universidad de Chile

- Primera División (5): 1994, 1995, 1999, 2000, 2004 Apertura
- Copa Chile (2): 1998, 2000
