= Christian González (footballer) =

Chilean footballer (born 1977)

Personal information
- Full name: Christian Alejandro González Peña
- Date of birth: 1977 (age 48–49)
- Place of birth: Los Ángeles, Chile
- Position: Forward

Senior career*
Years	Team	Apps	(Gls)
1997–2001	Huachipato	35	(1)
1998–1999	→ Malleco Unido (loan)		
2001	Deportes Concepción		
2002	Everton		(8)
2003	Semen Padang		(1)
2004–2005	PSMS Medan		(3)
2006	Pelita Jaya		
2007	Persiku Kudus		
2012	Sabor Latino (minifootball)		
2013	Persisko Bangko		
2014	PSM Makassar		
2016–2017	Assalam FC		
2018	Aceh United		
- * Club domestic league appearances and goals

Christian Alejandro González Peña (born 2 March 1977), known as Christian Alejandro in Indonesia, is a Chilean former professional footballer who played as a forward for clubs in Chile and Asia.

== Career ==
Born in Los Ángeles, Chile, González was a Chile youth international and played for Huachipato, Malleco Unido, Deportes Concepción and Everton in his homeland.

In 2003 he moved to Indonesia, where he had an extensive career playing for Semen Padang, PSMS Medan, Pelita Jaya, Persiku Kudus, Persisko Bangko and PSM Makassar. He also took part of minifootball club Sabor Latino in 2012, becoming the top goalscorer of the team. As a member of PSMS Medan, he won the 2005 Piala Emas Bang Yos (Gold Cup Bang Yos) alongside his compatriots Mario Quiñones, Luis Hicks and Alejandro Tobar. In Persiku Kudus, he coincided with his compatriot Octavio Pozo,

After a stint playing in Thailand, in 2016 he joined Assalam FC in the Liga Futebol Amadora Segunda Divisão thanks to Chilean coach Simón Elissetche, with whom he also returned to Indonesia by joining Aceh United in 2018.

== Honours ==
PSMS Medan

- Piala Emas Bang Yos (Gold Cup Bang Yos): 2005
