= Roberto González (Chilean footballer) =

Chilean footballer (born 1976)

Personal information
- Full name: Roberto Andrés González Beltrán
- Date of birth: 19 May 1976 (age 50)
- Place of birth: Olivar, Chile
- Height: 1.80 m (5 ft 11 in)
- Position: Goalkeeper

Senior career*
Years	Team	Apps	(Gls)
1998–2003	O'Higgins	103	(0)
2004–2006	Everton	54	(0)
2006	O'Higgins	1	(0)
2007–2009	Cobresal	114	(0)
2010–2016	O'Higgins	32	(0)
Total		304	(0)
- * Club domestic league appearances and goals

Roberto Andrés González Beltrán (born 19 May 1976) is a Chilean former footballer who played as a goalkeeper.

== Career ==
=== Youth career ===
González started his career at Primera División de Chile club O'Higgins. He progressed from the under categories club all the way to the senior team.

=== O'Higgins ===
As a member of the 1998 squad, he got promotion to the 1999 Primera División after being the runner-up in the Primera B alongside players such as Darío Gálvez, Alejandro Tobar, Danilo Miranda, Iván Sepúlveda, among others.

In 2012, González was runner-up with O'Higgins, after lose the final against Universidad de Chile in the penalty shoot-out.

González won the Apertura 2013-14 with O'Higgins. In the tournament, he played in 2 of 18 matches.

In 2014, he won the Supercopa de Chile against Deportes Iquique, being the goalkeeper of this match, and saving two penalty shoots at the shoot-out that won O'Higgins.

He participated with the club in the 2014 Copa Libertadores where they faced Deportivo Cali, Cerro Porteño and Lanús, being third and being eliminated in the group stage.

== Career statistics ==
=== Club ===
As of 16 January 2015

Club	Season	League			Copa Chile		Supercopa		Continental		Total	
Club	Season	Division	Apps	Goals	Apps	Goals	Apps	Goals	Apps	Goals	Apps	Goals
O'Higgins	2006	Primera División	1	0	—						1	0
O'Higgins	2010	Primera División	6	0	1	0	—				7	0
O'Higgins	2011	Primera División	5	0	1	0	—				6	0
O'Higgins	2012	Primera División	1	0	10	0	—		0	0	11	0
O'Higgins	2013	Primera División	4	0	—						4	0
O'Higgins	2013–14	Primera División	4	0	8	0	1	0	0 (Note: Appearances in the Copa Libertadores)	0	13	0
O'Higgins	2014–15	Primera División	4	0	3	0	—				7	0
Career total			25	0	23	0	1	0	0	0	49	0

== Honours ==
=== Club ===
O'Higgins

- Primera División: Apertura 2013-14
- Supercopa de Chile: 2014

=== Individual ===
O'Higgins

- Medalla Santa Cruz de Triana: 2014
