= 1998 Campeonato Nacional Primera División =

Campeonato Nacional Copa Banco del Estado
- Dates: 4 April – 13 December 1998
- Champions: Colo-Colo (22nd title)
- Relegated: Provincial Osorno (Rel. Play-off); Santiago Wanderers; Deportes Temuco
- 1999 Copa Libertadores: Colo-Colo; Universidad Católica (Liguilla winners)
- 1998 Copa CONMEBOL: Audax Italiano (Copa runners-up)
- 1999 Copa CONMEBOL: Deportes Concepción (Liguilla Semifinals)
- Matches: 239
- Goals: 695 (2.91 per match)
- Top goalscorer: Pedro González (23 goals)
- Biggest home win: Palestino 9–0 Deportes Temuco (26 April)
- Total attendance: 1,635,154
- Average attendance: 6,842

The 1998 Campeonato Nacional, known as Campeonato Nacional Copa Banco del Estado 1998 for sponsorship purposes, was the 67th season of top-flight football in Chile. Colo-Colo won their 22nd title following a 2–1 home win against Deportes Iquique on 13 December. Universidad Católica also qualified for the next Copa Libertadores as Liguilla winners.

== Standings ==
Pos	Team	Pld	W	D	L	GF	GA	GD	Pts	Qualification or relegation
1	Colo-Colo	30	19	7	4	54	19	+35	64	Champions and qualified for the 1999 Copa Libertadores
2	Universidad de Chile	30	18	9	3	62	37	+25	63	Qualified for the Liguilla Pre-Copa Libertadores
3	Universidad Católica	30	14	11	5	57	34	+23	53	Qualified for the Liguilla Pre-Copa Libertadores
4	Cobreloa	30	16	3	11	50	36	+14	51	Qualified for the Liguilla Pre-Copa Libertadores
5	Deportes Concepción	30	12	9	9	39	36	+3	45	Qualified for the Liguilla Pre-Copa Libertadores
6	Huachipato	30	11	7	12	39	38	+1	40	
7	Deportes Puerto Montt	30	10	9	11	43	46	−3	39	
8	Deportes Iquique	30	12	3	15	35	52	−17	39	
9	Deportes La Serena	30	10	7	13	39	47	−8	37	
10	Palestino	30	9	9	12	50	50	0	36	
11	Rangers	30	9	7	14	45	49	−4	34	
12	Audax Italiano	30	9	7	14	37	43	−6	34	
13	Coquimbo Unido	30	8	9	13	36	41	−5	33	Promotion/relegation play-offs
14	Provincial Osorno	30	8	7	15	41	52	−11	31	Promotion/relegation play-offs
15	Santiago Wanderers	30	6	12	12	40	56	−16	30	Relegated to Segunda División
16	Deportes Temuco	30	6	10	14	28	59	−31	13	Relegated to Segunda División

Primera División Chilena
1998 champion

22nd title

== Results ==
Home \ Away	AUD	CLO	COL	DCO	COQ	HUA	DIQ	DLS	POS	PAL	DPM	RAN	DTE	UCA	UCH	SWA
Audax		0–3	1–2	1–1	1–2	2–0	1–2	0–1	3–0	2–0	3–1	4–2	0–1	1–1	2–3	1–0
Cobreloa	3–0		0–0	4–0	2–1	2–0	6–3	2–1	1–0	1–0	2–0	1–2	5–0	2–1	1–0	1–0
Colo-Colo	1–2	3–0		1–0	1–0	1–0	2–1	4–1	3–2	0–0	4–0	4–0	3–0	0–2	1–1	2–0
Concepción	0–0	3–2	0–1		3–1	2–1	1–0	1–1	2–1	3–0	2–0	1–1	1–0	0–0	0–3	3–2
Coquimbo	1–2	4–1	0–0	1–3		2–0	2–1	3–2	3–3	2–1	0–0	1–1	3–0	1–1	0–1	0–0
Huachipato	3–3	6–1	1–2	1–0	1–0		4–0	1–0	0–0	1–1	2–1	2–1	2–1	0–2	2–1	1–1
Iquique	1–0	1–0	1–0	0–3	1–4	1–0		1–0	2–1	1–2	1–2	1–2	2–3	1–1	4–1	1–0
La Serena	2–1	1–0	1–0	1–1	1–0	0–0	1–2		3–2	4–2	2–2	1–0	1–1	1–2	0–3	1–1
Osorno	2–2	3–1	0–3	2–1	4–0	1–0	3–1	1–3		2–1	1–4	4–0	0–1	2–2	2–4	3–2
Palestino	1–0	0–2	2–2	2–2	3–1	1–1	1–2	2–1	1–0		4–0	2–1	9–0	1–1	2–2	6–2
P. Montt	1–1	1–0	0–0	1–0	3–0	3–1	4–1	2–4	0–0	1–1		1–0	2–0	0–1	1–1	6–1
Rangers	0–1	2–0	1–3	2–0	1–1	2–0	0–0	5–2	5–1	5–1	2–2		1–1	1–2	0–0	2–3
Temuco	2–0	1–1	0–5	0–3	0–0	1–2	0–0	2–2	0–0	3–1	4–1	1–3		1–1	0–1	1–1
U. Católica	6–1	0–4	1–3	3–1	2–2	1–3	4–0	1–0	1–0	1–1	4–1	4–0	5–1		1–3	6–1
U. Chile	2–1	2–1	1–1	2–2	1–0	3–2	3–1	3–1	2–1	3–1	2–2	3–1	4–2	1–1		3–1
S. Wanderers	1–1	1–1	1–2	2–2	2–1	2–2	1–2	2–0	0–0	4–1	2–1	2–1	1–1	1–1	3–3	

Legend: Blue = home team win; Yellow = draw; Red = away team win.

== Topscorers ==
Pos	Name	Team	Goals
1	(Chile) Pedro González	Universidad de Chile	23
2	(Chile) Marco Antonio Figueroa	Universidad Católica	16
3	(Chile) Héctor Tapia	Colo-Colo	15
4	(Chile) Marcelo Corrales	Palestino	14
5	(Chile) Héctor Vega	Deportes Iquique	13

== Liguilla Pre-Copa Libertadores ==
=== Semifinals ===
16 December 1998 1st leg	Cobreloa	2–2	Universidad Católica	Calama
	Vallejos 2'; Donoso 35'		25' Figueroa; 51' Ormazábal	Stadium: Municipal; Attendance: 3,758; Referee: Guido Aros

16 December 1998 1st leg	Deportes Concepción	1–3	Universidad de Chile	Concepción
	Bravo 38'		42', 90' P. González; 70' Maestri	Stadium: Collao; Attendance: 6,930; Referee: Eduardo Gamboa

18 December 1998 2nd leg	Universidad Católica	0–0 (2a–2 agg.)	Cobreloa	Las Condes, Santiago
				Stadium: San Carlos de Apoquindo; Attendance: 8,000; Referee: Pablo Pozo

18 December 1998 2nd leg	Universidad de Chile	1–0 (4–1 agg.)	Deportes Concepción	Independencia, Santiago
	Acuña 35'			Stadium: Santa Laura; Attendance: 10,000; Referee: Rubén Selman

=== Finals ===
20 December 1998 1st leg	Universidad Católica	0–0	Universidad de Chile	Ñuñoa, Santiago
				Stadium: Nacional; Attendance: 15,000; Referee: Mario Sánchez

23 December 1998 2nd leg	Universidad de Chile	0–0 (0–0 agg.) (2–4 p)	Universidad Católica	Ñuñoa, Santiago
				Stadium: Nacional; Attendance: 25,000; Referee: Guido Aros
	Penalties
	P. González (penalty scored); Rodríguez (penalty missed); Fuentes (penalty scored); C. Castañeda (penalty missed)		(penalty scored) Lepe; (penalty scored) Parraguez; (penalty scored) Ramírez; (penalty scored) Ríos

Universidad Católica qualified for the 1999 Copa Libertadores

== Promotion/relegation play-offs ==
19 December 1998	Santiago Morning	2 – 0	Provincial Osorno	Santa Laura
	Nuñez 29'; Avalos 78' (pen.)			Referee: Eduardo Gamboa

19 December 1998	Unión Española	1 – 6	Coquimbo Unido	Santa Laura
	Ibañez 2'		de Gregorio 23' 32'; Ortega Sánchez 45' 64'; Caro 52'; Cabello 55'	Attendance: 8,978; Referee: Christian Lemus

22 December 1998	Provincial Osorno	1 – 1	Santiago Morning	Parque Schott
	Calabresse		Gullace	Referee: Pablo Pozo

22 December 1998	Coquimbo Unido	1 – 3	Unión Española	Francisco Sánchez Rumoroso
	Ortega Sánchez		Villán; Gutiérrez

== See also ==
- 1998 Copa Apertura
