= 1947–48 Polska Liga Hokejowa season =

Polish ice hockey season

The 1947-48 Polska Liga Hokejowa season was the 13th season of the Polska Liga Hokejowa, the top level of ice hockey in Poland. 16 teams were set to participate in the playoffs, but the season was cancelled after only several games due to a mild winter. KS Cracovia, which was considered the best Polish club at the time, was named champions by the Polish Federation.

== Kraków Championship ==
- 2/29: Legia Kraków - Czuwaj Przemyśl 4:2

== Lower Silesian Championship ==
Played in Wrocław on 29 February 1948.

- Odra Opole - IKS Wrocław 2:1 (1:0, 1:1, 1:0)
- Odra Opole - OMTUR Jelenia Góra 7:1 (1:0, 3:0, 3:1)
- Len Wałbrzych - IKS Wrocław 5:3 (1:2, 1:1, 3:0)
- OMTUR Jelenia Gora - IKS Wrocław 4:2 (3:0, 1:1, 1:0)
- Len Wałbrzych - Odra Opole 2:0 (1:0, 0:0, 1:0)

Len won the championship.

== Pomeranian Championship ==
- 1/18: KH Pomorzanin Toruń - Partyzant Bydgoszcz 8:1 (1:0, 2:0, 5:0) [sic]
- 1/25: KH Pomorzanin Toruń - Partyzant Bydgoszcz 3:0 (2:0, 0:0, 1:0)
- 1/25: Brda Bydgoszcz - Wisła Tczew 4:2 (1:1, 1:0, 2:1)
- 1/25: Partyzant Bydgoszcz - Wisła Tczew 6:0 (1:0, 1:0, 4:0)
- 2/29: KH Pomorzanin Toruń - Brda Bydgoszcz 4:3 (1:0, 2:2, 1:1)
- 2/29: Brda Bydgoszcz - Partyzant Bydgoszcz 5:4
- 2/29: Partyzant Bydgoszcz - Brda Bydgoszcz 7:2

Table as of January 29:

	Club	GP	Goals	Pts
1	KH Pomorzanin Toruń	4	34:1	8
2	Brda Bydgoszcz	3	8:17	4
3	Partyzant Bydgoszcz	3	7:11	4
4	AZS Toruń	3	8:18	2
5	Wisła Tczew	3	5:15	0

== AZS Championship ==
- AZS Warszawa - AZS Poznań 4:1 (0:0, 2:1, 2:0)
- AZS Lublin - AZS Toruń 6:3 (1:0, 1:1, 4:2)
- AZS Warszawa - AZS Toruń 5:4 (2:0, 0:2, 3:2)
- AZS Poznań - AZS Lublin 4:3 (4:1, 0:1, 0:1)
- AZS Toruń - AZS Poznań 7:3 (1:1, 3:0, 3:2)
- AZS Lublin - AZS Warszawa 4:2 (2:2, 0:0, 2:0)

	Club	GP	Goals	Pts
1	AZS Lublin	3	13:9	4
2	AZS Warszawa	3	11:9	4
3	AZS Toruń	3	14:14	2
4	AZS Poznań	3	8:14	2

== Other games ==
- 12/21: KKS Mysłowice - KH Siemianowice 6:4 (4:1, 1:2, 1:1)
- 12/21: Polonia Bytom - Baildon Katowice 2:1 (1:1, 1:0, 0:0)
- 12/21: Polska Południowa - Polska Północna 5:2 (1:0, 2:0, 2:2)
- 12/21: Polish Olympic Team - Bydgoszcz 10:0 (2:0, 3:0, 5:0)
- 1/2: Wisła Kraków - KS Cracovia 7:6 (3:1, 3:3, 1:2) - both sides were re-enforced with players from other teams
- 1/?: Legia Warszawa - LKS Łódź 5:3 (2:2, 2:0, 1:1)
- 1/?: Legia Warszawa - LKS Łódź 6:5 (2:3, 3:2, 1:0)
- 1/24: KTH Krynica - Wisła Kraków 5:2
- 1/25: KTH Krynica - Wisła Kraków 2:2
- 1/25: Lech Poznań I - Lech Poznań II 7:2 (1:1, 3:0, 3:1)
- 1/?: KH Pomorzanin Toruń - Legia Warszawa 4:3
- 1/?: KH Pomorzanin Toruń - Legia Warszawa 1:1
- 2/18: KS Cracovia - KH Siemianowice 8:0 (1:0, 3:0, 4:0)
- 2/21: KS Cracovia - Legia Warszawa 7:2 (0:0, 2:2, 5:0)
- 2/22: KS Cracovia - Legia Warszawa 14:3 (6:0, 5:2, 3:1)
- 2/22: KTH Krynica - Wisła Kraków 6:1 (2:0, 2:1, 2:0)
- 2/22: AZS Warszawa - Brda Bydgoszcz 11:1 (3:1, 7:0, 1:0)
- 2/22: AZS Lublin - Międzyszkolny Klub Sportowy 10:0 (4:0, 4:0, 2:0)
- 2/22: Lech Poznań - Stella Gniezno 3:2 (0:1, 1:0, 2:1)
- 2/22: Lech Poznań - Stella Gniezno 8:2 (2:0, 3:2, 3:0)
- 2/22: Siła Giszowiec - KKS Mysłowice 4:1 (0:1, 2:0, 2:0)
- 2/22: Siła Giszowiec - KH Siemianowice 3:1 (1:1, 0:0, 2:0)
- 2/?: LKS Łódź - AZS Warszawa 13:1
- 2/?: LKS Łódź - AZS Warszawa 6:3
- 2/25: Lech Poznań - AZS Poznań 2:0 (0:0, 0:0, 2:0)
- 2/28: KS Cracovia - Legia Warszawa 5:5 (1:2, 0:2, 4:1)
- 2/29: KS Cracovia - Legia Warszawa 8:2 (2:1, 4:1, 2:0)
- 2/29: Wisła Kraków - Wisła Zakopane 9:3
- 2/?: Odra Opole - Pogoń Prudnik 11:0 (6:0, 1:0, 4:0)
- 3/?: KSZO Ostrowiec - HKS 1:1 (0:0, 0:1, 1:0)
- 3/7: Wisła Zakopane - RKS Legia 2:0
- KS Cracovia - LKS Łódź 5:1
- KS Cracovia - Siła Giszowiec 7:2
- KS Cracovia - Siła Giszowiec 2:2
