= Ryszard Fudali =

Polish footballer

Personal information
- Date of birth: 16 August 1971 (age 55)
- Place of birth: Kraków, Poland
- Height: 1.79 m (5 ft 10 in)
- Position: Defender

Senior career*
Years	Team	Apps	(Gls)
1990–1997	Hutnik Kraków		
1997	Śląsk Wrocław		
1998	Czuwaj Przemyśl		
1998–2002	Cracovia		
2002–2003	Stal Stalowa Wola	28	(2)
2003–2005	Proszowianka Proszowice		
2005–2007	Puszcza Niepołomice		
2007	Zjednoczeni Branice		
- * Club domestic league appearances and goals

Ryszard Fudali (born 16 August 1971) is a Polish former professional footballer who played as a defender.
