= 1998 Copa Apertura =

Tournament details
- Country: Chile
- Teams: 16

Final positions
- Champions: Universidad de Chile
- Runners-up: Audax Italiano

Tournament statistics
- Top goal scorer: Alejandro Carrasco (5 goals)

The 1998 Copa Apertura was the 27th edition of the Chilean Cup tournament. The competition started on February 14, 1998, and concluded on April 1, 1998. Only first level teams took part in the tournament. Universidad de Chile won the competition for their second time, beating Audax Italiano on the finals.

== Calendar ==
Round	Date
Group Round	14 February 1998; 8 March 1998
Semi-finals	14–21 March 1998
Finals	28 March 1998; 1 April 1998

== Group Round ==
Key to colours in group tables
Teams that progressed to the Semifinals

=== Group 1 ===
	CLOA	COQU	DLSE	DIQU
Cobreloa		5–0	1–1	4–1
Coquimbo U.	4–1		1–2	2–0
D. La Serena	3–2	0–1		2–0
D. Iquique	2–2	2–0	2–1	

Rank	Team	Points
1	Deportes La Serena	10
2	Coquimbo Unido	9
3	Cobreloa	8
4	Deportes Iquique	7

=== Group 2 ===
	UCHI	COLO	RANG	SWAN
U. de Chile		1–0	2–1	2–0
Colo-Colo	1–0		0–1	1–0
Rangers	0–3	1–0		3–0
S. Wanderers	1–1	3–1	2–2	

Rank	Team	Points
1	Universidad de Chile	13
2	Rangers	10
3	Colo-Colo	6
4	Santiago Wanderers	5

=== Group 3 ===
	AUDI	PALE	DCON	UCAT
Audax I.		4–0	2–1	2–0
Palestino	2–4		1–0	1–4
D. Concepción	1–0	2–2		1–0
U. Católica	1–1	2–2	5–3	

Rank	Team	Points
1	Audax Italiano	13
2	Universidad Católica	8
3	Deportes Concepción	7
4	Palestino	5

=== Group 4 ===
	DTEM	DPMO	POSO	HUAC
D. Temuco		0–3	1–0	1–1
D. Puerto Montt	1–1		1–0	0–1
P. Osorno	1–3	1–2		2–1
Huachipato	1–2	3–2	0–1	

Rank	Team	Points
1	Deportes Temuco	11
2	Deportes Puerto Montt	10
3	Huachipato	7
4	Provincial Osorno	6

== Semifinals ==
March 14, 1998

Deportes La Serena	0 – 3	Universidad de Chile
		26', 33' Maestri; 48' Barrera

Estadio La Portada, La Serena
Attendance: 13,182
Referee: M. Peña

March 15, 1998

Deportes Temuco	0 – 0	Audax Italiano

Estadio Municipal Germán Becker, Temuco
Attendance: 8,000
Referee: M. Sánchez

March 21, 1998

Audax Italiano	2 – 0	Deportes Temuco
Guirland 1', 83' (pen.)

Estadio San Carlos de Apoquindo, Santiago
Attendance: 1,500
Referee: E. Gamboa

March 21, 1998

Universidad de Chile	2 – 2	Deportes La Serena
Mafla 34'; Maestri 40'		18' Ceballos; 19' Flores

Estadio Nacional, Santiago
Attendance: 17,587
Referee: R. Selman

== Finals ==
=== First leg ===
March 28, 1998
19:10 (UTC-4)

Universidad de Chile	1–1	Audax Italiano
Valencia 10'		44' Carrasco

Estadio Nacional, Santiago
Attendance: 21,000
Referee: G. Aros

=== Second leg ===
April 1, 1998
20:10 (UTC-4)

Audax Italiano	0–2	Universidad de Chile
		4' Valencia; 7' Mafla

Estadio Santa Laura, Santiago
Attendance: 20,000
Referee: C. Lemus

Copa Chile
1998 Champion
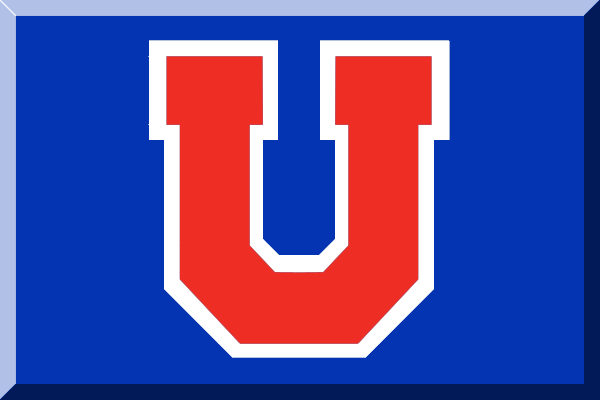
U. de Chile
Second Title

== Top goalscorer ==
- Alejandro Carrasco (Audax Italiano) 5 goals

== See also ==
- 1998 Campeonato Nacional
