= Dinamarca =

Dinamarca is the term for Denmark in several of the Romance languages. As a surname, it may refer to the following people:

- Mauricio Dinamarca, Chilean footballer
- Rossana Dinamarca, Swedish politician
