= Angelo Espinosa =

Chilean footballer

Personal information
- Full name: Angelo Andrés Espinosa Celis
- Date of birth: 1975 (age 50–51)
- Place of birth: Santiago, Chile
- Position: Midfielder

Senior career*
| Years | Team | Apps | (Gls) |
| 1997 | Santiago Morning | 24 | (0) |
| 2001 | PSMS Medan | | |
| 2003–2004 | Persib Bandung | | |
| 2005 | Persiba Balikpapan | | (3) |
- * Club domestic league appearances and goals

Angelo Andrés Espinosa Celis (born 1975), commonly referred to as Angelo Espinoza, is a Chilean former professional football midfielder who played for clubs in Chile and Indonesia.

== Career ==
Born in Santiago, in his country of birth, Espinosa played for Santiago Morning in the Primera B in 1997, making 24 appearances.

Abroad, he played in Indonesia for PSMS Medan (2001), Persib Bandung (2003–04), and Persiba Balikpapan (2005).

In Persib Bandung, he coincided with his compatriots Rodrigo Sanhueza, Alejandro Tobar, Claudio Lizama, Julio Lopez, and coach Juan Páez.

== After football ==
Espinosa worked in the football academy of Universidad Católica and studied at INACAP.
