= Mauricio Dinamarca =

Chilean footballer

Personal information
- Full name: Mauricio Hernán Dinamarca Hidalgo
- Date of birth: 9 February 1976 (age 50)
- Place of birth: Rancagua, Chile
- Height: 1.76 m (5 ft 9 in)
- Position: Midfielder

Youth career
- O'Higgins

Senior career*
| Years | Team | Apps | (Gls) |
| 1998–2000 | O'Higgins | 69 | (19) |
| 2001–2004 | Cobreloa | 128 | (27) |
| 2005 | Unión Española | 12 | (1) |
| 2005 | Deportivo Pasto | 15 | (2) |
| 2006 | Deportes Antofagasta | 14 | (1) |
| 2007 | Ñublense | 8 | (0) |
| 2008 | San Luis | 16 | (1) |
| Total | | 262 | (51) |
- * Club domestic league appearances and goals

Mauricio Hernán Dinamarca Hidalgo (born 9 February 1976) is a Chilean former footballer who played as a midfielder for clubs in Chile and Colombia.

== Career ==
A product of O'Higgins youth system, Dinamarca made his debut in the 1998 season, when the club got promotion to the 1999 Primera División de Chile, alongside players such as Iván Sepúlveda, Roberto González, Alejandro Tobar, Mario Núñez, among others. He is better known by his seasons with Cobreloa (2001–03), with whom he won three league titles, being the final matches against Colo-Colo in 2003 well remembered.

In his homeland, he also played for Unión Española, winning the 2005 Apertura of the Primera División, Deportes Antofagasta, Ñublense and San Luis de Quillota.

In second half 2005, he played for Colombian side Deportivo Pasto.

He retired after leaving San Luis de Quillota in 2009.
