= Claudio Martínez =

Chilean footballer and actor

Personal information
- Full name: Claudio Hernán Martínez Gallardo
- Date of birth: 18 July 1980 (age 46)
- Place of birth: Santiago, Chile
- Position: Striker

Senior career*
Years	Team	Apps	(Gls)
2004	Persim Maros		(1)
2005	Mitra Kukar		(3)
- Persekaba Badung
- PSMS Medan
2008	Persigo Gorontalo		(8)
2009	PPSM Magelang		
2016	Assalam FC		
- * Club domestic league appearances and goals

Claudio Hernán Martínez Gallardo (born 18 July 1980) is a Chilean actor and former professional footballer who played as a goalkeeper for clubs in Indonesia.

== Football career ==
Born in Santiago, Chile, Martínez played mainly as a striker in Indonesia and used to wear the number 99.

In Indonesia, he played for Persim Maros, Mitra Kukar, Persekaba Badung, PSMS Medan, Persigo Gorontalo, where he scored eight goals, and PPSM Magelang.

He retired in 2009 and has continued playing football at exhibition games alongside players such as Cristian Carrasco and Alejandro Tobar.

In 2016, he had a stint with East Timorese side Assalam FC with his compatriot Simón Elissetche as coach.

== Acting career ==
Following his retirement as a football player, he made his home in Indonesia and switched to showbiz and acting. Using the stage name of Claudio, he became famous after making appearances in the TV series Tendangan Si Madun (Madun's Kick).

He also has been renowned by his appearances in series such as Pangeran (Prince), Samson dan Dahlia (Samson and Delilah) and ABG Jadi Manten.

He has also acted in films and took part in advertising for brands such as Mitsubishi and Richesee Nabati.

== Personal life ==
Martínez came to Indonesia in 2001.

His wife is an Indonesian called Musriana, but he prefers calling her Ana. They have a daughter named Alexandra.

=== Controversies ===
In 2005, he was arrested by taking part in a party with drug use, when he was a player of Mitra Kukar.

In November 2018, Martínez was arrested by drug possession in his home in Depok.

In July 2022, Martínez was assaulted by the employees of a bar located in Kuningan, Jakarta.
