= Yohanes Kandaimu =

Indonesian footballer (born 1995)

Personal information
- Full name: Yohanes Kandaimu
- Date of birth: 12 August 1995 (age 31)
- Place of birth: Mappi, Indonesia
- Height: 1.89 m (6 ft 2 in)
- Position: Centre-back

Team information
- Current team: Persiku Kudus
- Number: 50

Youth career
- PS Cigombong Putra

Senior career*
Years	Team	Apps	(Gls)
2017	Persimap Mappi		
2018	Sukabumi 28		
2021	PSG Pati		
2021	PSBS Biak	7	(0)
2022–2023	Persita Tangerang	21	(1)
2023	Persebaya Surabaya	6	(0)
2023–2024	PSPS Riau		
2024–2025	PSBS Biak		
2025	Persiku Kudus	7	(1)
2026	Persipal Palu		
2026	Kelantan TRW	5	(0)
2026–	Persiku Kudus	0	(0)
- * Club domestic league appearances and goals as of 10 April 2026

Yohanes Kandaimu (born 12 August 1995) is an Indonesian professional footballer who plays as a centre-back for Championship club Persiku Kudus.

== Club career ==
=== Persimap Mappi ===
In the 2017 season, at the same time as the 2017 Liga 3 Papua zone, he was part of the Persimap Mappi squad for the competition.

=== PSBS Biak ===
On 2021, Kandaimu signed a one-year contract with Liga 2 club PSBS Biak. He made 7 league appearances for PSBS Biak in the 2021 Liga 2 (Indonesia).

=== Persita Tangerang ===
He was signed for Persita Tangerang to play in Liga 1 in the 2022 season. Kandaimu made his league debut on 25 July 2022 in a match against Persik Kediri at the Indomilk Arena, Tangerang.

=== Persebaya Surabaya ===
Kandaimu was signed for Persebaya Surabaya to play in Liga 1 in the 2023–24 season.

== Career statistics ==
=== Club ===
As of 10 April 2026

Club	Season	League			Cup		Other		Total	
Club	Season	Division	Apps	Goals	Apps	Goals	Apps	Goals	Apps	Goals
PSBS Biak	2021–22	Liga 2	7	0	0	0	0	0	7	0
Persita Tangerang	2022–23	Liga 1	21	1	0	0	3 (Note: Appearances in Indonesia President's Cup)	0	24	1
Persebaya Surabaya	2023–24	Liga 1	6	0	0	0	0	0	6	0
PSPS Riau	2023–24	Liga 2	4	0	0	0	0	0	4	0
PSBS Biak	2024–25	Liga 1	3	0	0	0	0	0	3	0
Persiku Kudus	2025–26	Liga 2	7	1	0	0	0	0	7	1
Persipal Palu	2025–26	Liga 2	1	0	0	0	0	0	1	0
Kelantan TRW	2025–26	Malaysia Super League	5	0	0	0	3 (Note: Appearances in MFL Challenge Cup)	0	8	0
Career total			54	2	0	0	6	0	60	2
