= Octavio Pozo =

Chilean footballer (born 1983)

Personal information
- Full name: Octavio Ernesto Pozo Miranda
- Date of birth: 31 July 1983 (age 43)
- Place of birth: Santiago, Chile
- Height: 1.70 m (5 ft 7 in)
- Position: Midfielder

Senior career*
Years	Team	Apps	(Gls)
2003–2005	Audax Italiano	3	(0)
2006–2007	Persiku Kudus		(1)
2007–2008	Palestino	17	(0)
2009	Naval	16	(1)
2009	Deportes Melipilla	14	(3)
2010–2011	Unión La Calera	69	(7)
2012–2013	Huachipato	33	(0)
2013–2016	Ñublense	98	(2)
2016–2017	San Marcos	40	(2)
2018	Ñublense	28	(1)
2009–2012	Deportes Puerto Montt	18	(0)
2020–2021	Colchagua	38	(1)
Total			(18)
- * Club domestic league appearances and goals

Octavio Ernesto Pozo Miranda (born 31 July 1983) is a Chilean former footballer who played as a midfielder.

== Career ==
In 2006–07, Pozo had a stint with Persiku Kudus, where he coincided with his compatriot Christian González.

He retired at the end of the 2021 season.

== Honours ==
=== Player ===
Palestino

- Primera División de Chile (1): Runner-up 2008 Clausura

Huachipato

- Primera División de Chile (1): 2012
