= Luis Hicks =

Chilean footballer (born 1978)

Personal information
- Full name: Luis Eduardo Hicks Castillo
- Date of birth: November 27, 1978 (age 47)
- Place of birth: Puerto Natales, Chile
- Height: 1.78 m (5 ft 10 in)
- Position: Defensive midfielder

Senior career*
Years	Team	Apps	(Gls)
1997–2000	Provincial Osorno	25	(0)
2001–2002	Rangers de Talca	22	(0)
2002–2004	Unión Española	15	(0)
2004–2006	PSMS Medan	42	(5)
2006–2007	Medan Jaya	24	(2)
2007–2008	Persikabo Bogor	22	(0)
2008–2009	Sengkang Punggol		(1)
2009–2010	Woodlands Wellington		
2010–2012	Medan Chiefs	18	(0)
- * Club domestic league appearances and goals

Luis Eduardo Hicks Castillo (born November 27, 1978) is a Chilean former footballer who played as a defender.

== Playing career ==
Hicks first played for Provincial Osorno, before moving to Rangers de Talca, and Unión Española, all three clubs being in his homeland.

His next destination was to be Indonesia, where he played for another three clubs, PSMS Medan, Medan Jaya and Persikabo Bogor until 2008 when he moved to Singapore to play for Sengkang Punggol and Woodlands Wellington FC. As a member of PSMS Medan, he won the 2005 Piala Emas Bang Yos (Gold Cup Bang Yos) alongside his compatriots Mario Quiñones, Christian González and Alejandro Tobar.

His last club was Medan Chiefs in Liga Premier Indonesia. It is a club that owned by Sihar Sitorus, a businessman tha own Pro Titan FC in Medan, Indonesia.

== Coaching career ==
Following his retirement at the age of 33 in 2011, Hicks began studying to become a football coach. He has developed a career as coach at youth academies.

He later coached the football team in ACS Jakarta school. He coached the team during the JSSL Singapore Professional Academy 7s 2024 tournament in the u16 division, where they lost in the quarter finals.

== Honours ==
PSMS Medan

- Piala Emas Bang Yos (Gold Cup Bang Yos): 2005
- ACS Honours Day commendation award
