= 2007 Campeonato Nacional Primera B =

Primera B de Chile
- Season: 2007
- Champions: Provincial Osorno
- Promoted: Curicó Unido; C.S.D. Rangers
- Relegated: Deportivo Temuco
- Top goalscorer: Mario Núñez (19)

The 2007 Primera B de Chile was the 57th completed season of the Primera B de Chile.

== Table ==
Pos	Team	Pld	W	D	L	GF	GA	GD	Pts	Promotion or relegation
1	Provincial Osorno (C)	40	17	13	10	50	41	+9	64	Champion Promoted to 2008 Primera División de Chile season
2	Rangers	40	18	12	10	52	36	+16	63 (Note: 3 points deducted for not paying players on time)	Promoted to 2008 Primera División de Chile season
3	Santiago Morning	40	16	15	9	54	44	+10	63	Category's Promotion Playoffs
4	Deportes Copiapó	40	18	11	11	53	33	+20	60 (Note: 5 points deducted for using ineligible players)	Category's Promotion Playoffs
5	Unión La Calera	40	16	9	15	49	42	+7	57	
6	San Luis Quillota	40	14	13	13	57	54	+3	55	
7	Municipal Iquique	40	12	15	13	33	41	−8	51	
8	Unión San Felipe	40	10	14	16	40	47	−7	44	
9	Curicó Unido	40	11	11	18	34	44	−10	44	
10	Fernández Vial	40	13	8	19	31	47	−16	44	
11	Deportivo Temuco	40	10	9	21	31	55	−24	39	Relegated to Tercera División

Source: RSSSF
(C) Champions

== See also ==
- Chilean football league system
