= Persiku Kudus =

Association football team in Indonesia

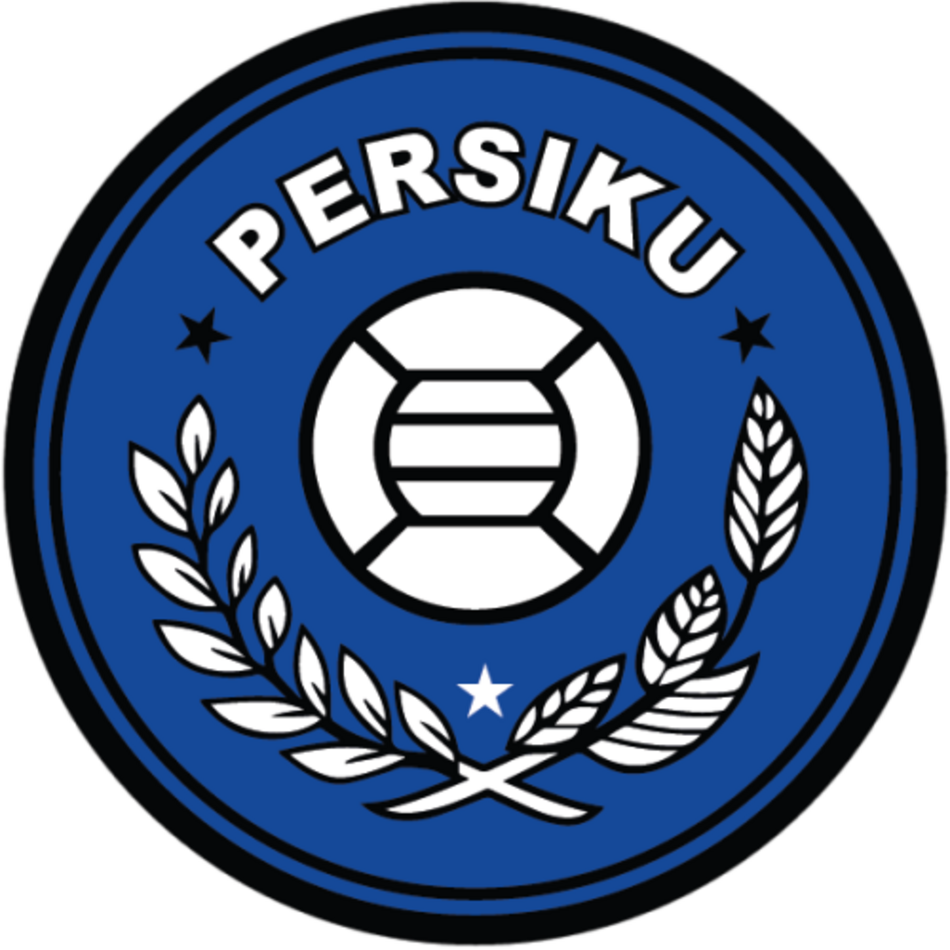
- Full name: Persatuan Sepak Bola Indonesia Kudus
- Nicknames: Macan Muria (The Muria Tigers); Laskar Telingsing (Telingsing Warriors)
- Short name: KDS
- Founded: 1 January 1934; 92 years ago (Pre-independence Indonesia); 12 April 1955; 71 years ago (Post-independence Indonesia)
- Ground: Wergu Wetan Stadium
- Capacity: 15,000
- Owner: PT Relasi Sport Muria Indonesia
- President: Anthonius Budiawan Perwata
- Head coach: Bambang Pujo Sumantri
- League: Championship
- 2025–26: 7th (2nd Group)
- Website: www.persiku.com
Home colours	Away colours

Persatuan Sepak Bola Indonesia Kudus (lit. 'Indonesian Football Association of Kudus'), simply known as Persiku Kudus is an Indonesian professional football club based in Kudus Regency, Central Java. Persiku is currently competing in the Championship. It has the nicknames Macan Muria and Laskar Telingsing, and its supporters are known as the SMM (Suporter Macan Muria). Persiku is headquartered at the Wergu Wetan Stadium.

Persiku's best achievement was in the 2005 Liga Indonesia Second Division, as they managed to become champions in a 2–1 victory over Perserang Serang. Persiku's player Agus Santiko was the top scorer with 16 goals.

== History ==
Football activities in Kudus have actually existed since the Dutch East Indies era, but there was no organization to oversee it. It is officially stated that Persiku Kudus was founded on 1 January 1934. Football in Kudus got an umbrella organization on 12 April 1955 with the establishment of the Indonesian Football Association of Kudus or Persiku Kudus, which was initiated by a TNI officer Major Supardiyono, who at the time served as Dandim Kudus. Since then, Persiku Kudus has become association that oversees all football activities in Kudus Regency. Football became a kind of self-identification, social, and cultural process for the people of Kudus.

== Identity ==
=== Logo ===
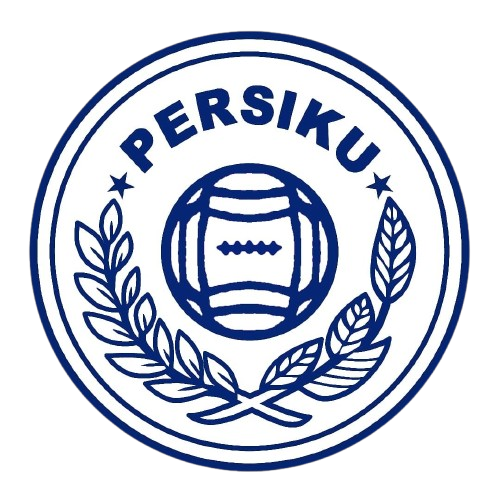
The First Logo of Persiku Kudus

=== Motto ===
Sengkuyung Bareng (working together in a spirit of mutual cooperation) is the foundation for Persiku Kudus. This motto is the result of cooperation between various parties, including supporters, government, and the private sector, to realize the club glory.

== Records ==
=== Divisi Utama Liga Indonesia ===
- 2009–10: Divisi Utama, 11th in group 3

=== League 3 ===
- 2017: League 3, last 6 round (Central Java Region)
- 2018: 3rd in Group 1 (Central Java Region)
- 2019: Central Java champions, Java Regional round
- 2020: Canceled due COVID–19 pandemic in Indonesia
- 2021–22: 5th in group A (Central Java Region)
- 2022–23: Last 18 round (Central Java Region), Liga 3 National Phase abandoned after due Kanjuruhan Stadium disaster
- 2023–24: Semifinal (Central Java Region) & 3rd in the last 8 round (National Phase), promoted

=== League 2 / Championship ===
- 2024–25: 1st in group J (Relegation Round)
- 2025-26: 7th in Group 2 (East)

== Players ==
=== Current squad ===
As of September 2026

Note: Flags indicate national team as defined under FIFA eligibility rules; some limited exceptions apply. Players may hold more than one non-FIFA nationality.

No.	Pos.	Nation	Player
4	DF	BRA	Willian Correia
5	DF	IDN	Nurhidayat (captain)
7	MF	POR	Vítor Barata
8	MF	IDN	Yulius Pamungkas
9	FW	BLR	Ivan Veras
11	FW	IDN	Muhammad Isa
12	DF	IDN	Tirto Wicaksono
14	MF	IDN	Dheo Budi
15	MF	IDN	Arjuna Agung
17	FW	IDN	Bagus Pradana
18	DF	IDN	Rezal Pohan
19	FW	IDN	Dwi Aditya
21	GK	IDN	Muhammad Ridwan
22	MF	IDN	Krisna Vincensius
23	MF	IDN	Restu Akbar
24	FW	IDN	Marinus Wanewar
25	MF	IDN	Kanu Helmiawan
26	MF	IDN	Safna Delpi
28	MF	IDN	Bagas Umar

No.	Pos.	Nation	Player
32	DF	IDN	Rasha Efendi
37	MF	IDN	Zahran Alamsah
45	DF	IDN	Syiha Buddin
50	DF	IDN	Yohanes Kandaimu
51	GK	IDN	Rangga Pratama
56	MF	IDN	Irfan Afghoni
57	GK	IDN	Fidelis Davin
66	DF	IDN	Fadil Agha
67	FW	IDN	Mufid Zainun Falah
71	FW	IDN	Khoirul Anam
73	DF	IDN	Bhima Wibnu
77	DF	IDN	Iqbal Hadi
79	FW	IDN	Federico Assis
87	DF	IDN	Mochamad Tegar
88	DF	IDN	Raja Doli Nasution
90	FW	IDN	Muntasir Osman
93	DF	IDN	Lucky Oktavianto

== Notable foreign players ==
- (Chile) Alejandro Tobar
- (Chile) Christian Alejandro Gonzalez
- (Chile) Edson Leonardo
- (Chile) Octavio Pozo
- (Chile) Reinaldo Ahumada
- (Brazil) Caíque Souza
- (Brazil) Igor Henrique
- (Brazil) Jaime Xavier
- (Paraguay) Richard Caceres
- (Venezuela) Ronny Maza
- (Guinea) Lamarana Diallo
- (Liberia) Varney Pas Boakay
- (Japan) Renshi Yamaguchi

== Non-playing staff ==
=== Advisory board ===
Position	Name
Chairman	(Indonesia) Nusron Wahid
Deputy chairman	(Indonesia) Mawahib Afkar

=== Management ===
The current management of Persiku Kudus is as follows:

Position	Name
General director	(Indonesia) Abdul Fuad Amirul Adha
Deputy general director	(Indonesia) Irwan Syah
Finance director	(Indonesia) Imam Baikuni
Operations and business director	(Indonesia) Muh. Abdul Idris
Technical director	(Argentina) Marcos Guillermo Samso
President	(Indonesia) Anthonius Budiawan Perwata
Manager	(Indonesia) Widhoro Heriyanto
Assistant manager	(Indonesia) M. Failani Fasa
Media officer	(Indonesia) Syaiful Romansah

==== Coaching staff ====
Position	Name
Head coach	(Indonesia) Bambang Pujo Sumantri
Assistant coaches	(Indonesia) M. Syaiful Annas
Physical coach	(Indonesia) Budi Kurnia
Goalkeeper coach	(Indonesia) Wahyudi
Team doctor	(Indonesia) Andy Permana
Physiotherapist	(Indonesia) Dewan Widya Darma
Masseur	(Indonesia) Agus Fariqi
Kitman	(Indonesia) Rebo
Kitman	(Indonesia) Mulyono
Kitman	(Indonesia) Safrudin Yusuf

== Head coaching history ==
Season	Name
2004–2006	(Indonesia) M. Hanafing Ibrahim
2007	(Indonesia) Subangkit
2008	(Indonesia) Lukas Tumbuan
2008	(Indonesia) Kasiadi
2009	(Indonesia) Welly Podungge
2010	(Indonesia) Lukas Tumbuan
2011–2012	(Indonesia) Riono Asnan
2013	(Indonesia) Lukas Tumbuan
2014	(Indonesia) Agus Riyanto
2015	(Indonesia) Riono Asnan
2016–2018	(Indonesia) Yayat R. Hidayat
2019	(Indonesia) Subangkit
2020	(Indonesia) Hartono Ruslan
2021	(Indonesia) Cucun Sulistyo
2022	(Indonesia) M. Irfan
2023–24	(Indonesia) Denny Rumba
2024/2025	(Indonesia) Sudirman
2024/2025	(Indonesia) Awaludin (Caretaker)
2024/2025	(Indonesia) Bonggo Pribadi
2024/2025	(Indonesia) Alfiat
2025/2026	(Indonesia) Alfiat
2025/2026	(Indonesia) Noor Hadi (Caretaker)
2025/2026	(Indonesia) Bambang Pujo Sumantri

== Apparel ==
The following is the official apparel of Persiku Kudus.

Period	Kit manufacturer
1994–1995	(Germany) Adidas
2005	(Thailand) FBT Sports 1952
2007	(Germany) Adidas
2008–2010	(Indonesia) Vilour
2012	(Indonesia) Vilour
2014	(Indonesia) Vienna Sport
2015	(Indonesia) Moeria Jersey
2017	(Indonesia) Calsie Sport
2018	(Indonesia) PSO Apparel
2019	(Indonesia) Vilour
2020	(Indonesia) Total Sportswear
2021	(Indonesia) PSO Apparel
2022	(Indonesia) MJS Apparel
2023–	(Indonesia) Total Sportswear

== Season-by-season records ==
Season(s)	League/Division	Tms.	Pos.	Piala Indonesia	I-League Cup	AFC competition(s)	
1994–95	Premier Division	34	12th, West division	–	–	–	–
1995–96	Premier Division	31	Withdrew	–	–	–	–
2004	Second Division	41	3rd, First round	–	–	–	–
2005	Second Division	24	1	First round	–	–	–
2006	First Division	36	8th, Group 2	Round of 16	–	–	–
2007	First Division	40	2nd, Group 2	–	–	–	–
2008–09	Premier Division	29	13th, Group 2	First round	–	–	–
2009–10	Premier Division	33	11th, Group 3	–	–	–	–
2010–11	Premier Division	39	7th, Group 3	–	–	–	–
2011–12	Premier Division	22	4th, Second round	–	–	–	–
2013	Premier Division	39	4th, Group 2	–	–	–	–
2014	Premier Division	60	7th, Group 4	–	–	–	–
2015	Liga Nusantara	season abandoned		–	–	–	–
2016	ISC Liga Nusantara	32	4	–	–	–	–
2017	Liga 3	32	Eliminated in Provincial round	–	–	–	–
2018	Liga 3	32	Eliminated in Provincial round	–	–	–	–
2019	Liga 3	32	Eliminated in Regional round	–	–	–	–
2020	Liga 3	season abandoned		–	–	–	–
2021–22	Liga 3	64	Eliminated in Provincial round	–	–	–	–
2022–23	Liga 3	season abandoned		–	–	–	–
2023–24	Liga 3	80	3rd, Fourth round	–	–	–	–
2024–25	Liga 2	26	1st, Relegation round	–	–	–	–
2025–26	Championship	20	7th, Group 2	–	–	–	–
2026–27	Championship	20	TBD	–	TBD	–	–

== Honours ==
- Liga Indonesia Second Division
  - Champions (1): 2005
- Liga Nusantara
  - Fourth place: 2016
- Liga 3 Central Java
  - Champions (2): 2016, 2019
