= Richard Olivares =

Chilean footballer (born 1978)

Personal information
- Full name: Richard Hans Olivares López
- Date of birth: 7 September 1978 (age 48)
- Place of birth: Antofagasta, Chile
- Height: 1.70 m (5 ft 7 in)
- Position: Forward

Senior career*
Years	Team	Apps	(Gls)
1996–2001	Magallanes		
2002	Deportes Temuco	24	(4)
2003	Unión Española	13	(1)
2003–2004	América	0	(0)
2004	→ Tigrillos Coapa (loan)	18	(8)
2004	San Luis Potosí	11	(4)
2005–2006	Delfines de Coatzacoalcos	36	(3)
2006–2007	Lobos BUAP	28	(5)
2007–2014	Deportes Antofagasta	174	(31)
2014–2015	Coquimbo Unido	24	(0)
2015–2016	Colchagua	30	(6)

Managerial career
- 2021: Deportes Antofagasta women (assistant)
- 2021: Deportes Antofagasta women
- * Club domestic league appearances and goals

Richard Hans Olivares Lopez (born 4 September 1978) is a Chilean former footballer who played as a forward.

== Playing career ==
Olivares played for Deportes Antofagasta and other clubs in his country and Mexico.

== Coaching career ==
In June 2021, Olivares assumed as the head coach of Deportes Antofagasta women after Luciano Poggi was released. Previously he was the assistant coach. He left the charge at the beginning of 2022.

== Personal life ==
He is the younger brother of Cristian Olivares, who also played for Deportes Antofagasta, Magallanes, Coquimbo Unido and Deportes Temuco.

He is nicknamed Corazón Valiente (Brave Heart), since he has a pacemaker due to a heart defect detected while he was a player of Deportes Antofagasta in 2008.

== Honours ==
=== Player ===
Deportes Antofagasta

- Primera B de Chile: 2011 Apertura
