= Rodrigo Sanhueza =

Chilean footballer (born 1977)

Personal information
- Full name: Rodrigo Alejandro Sanhueza Godoy
- Date of birth: 21 October 1977 (age 49)
- Place of birth: Temuco, Chile
- Height: 1.78 m (5 ft 10 in)
- Position: Attacking midfielder

Youth career
- Colo-Colo

Senior career*
Years	Team	Apps	(Gls)
1996–1999	Colo-Colo	18	(0)
2000–2001	Santiago Morning	24	(5)
2000–2002	Deportes Concepción	35	(7)
2003	Persib Bandung		(2)
2004	Persigo Gorontalo		(1)
2004–2005	Deportes Temuco	51	(4)

International career
2008–2011	Chile (beach soccer)		
- * Club domestic league appearances and goals

Rodrigo Alejandro Sanhueza Godoy (born 21 October 1977) is a Chilean former professional footballer who played as an attacking midfielder for clubs in Chile and Indonesia. He also was a Chile international beach soccer player.

== Club career ==
A product of Colo-Colo youth system, Sanhueza made appearances for the first team in 1997, 1998 and 1999. As an anecdote, he took part in the first derby against Universidad Católica played in the Estadio San Carlos de Apoquindo, alongside players such as Luis Mena, Pablo Contreras and Nicolás Córdova.

In Chile, he after played for Santiago Morning, Deportes Concepción and Deportes Temuco.

Abroad, he played in Indonesia for Persib Bandung in 2003 and Persigo Gorontalo in 2004.

== International career ==
Following his retirement as a football player, he represented the Chile beach soccer team from 2008 to 2011. In 2009, he took part in the South American Championship, alongside retired professional footballers such as Cristian Olivares, Rodrigo Cuevas, Jorge Torres, Germán Osorio and Carlos Medina, with Miguel Ángel Gamboa as coach. In 2010, they won the Copa Latina after defeating Argentina, being named the best player of the tournament.

== Personal life ==
As a beach soccer player, he was nicknamed El Acróbata (The Acrobat).

== Honours ==
Colo-Colo

- Primera División de Chile (3): 1996, 1997 Clausura, 1998
- Copa Chile (1): 1996

Chile (beach soccer)

- Copa Latina (1): 2010
