= Syiha Buddin =

Indonesian footballer

Personal information
- Full name: Ahmad Syiha Buddin
- Date of birth: 5 April 2001 (age 25)
- Place of birth: Jepara, Indonesia
- Height: 1.75 m (5 ft 9 in)
- Position: Centre-back

Team information
- Current team: Persiku Kudus
- Number: 45

Youth career
- 2017: Porprov Jepara
- 2018: Persijap Jepara
- 2019: PSS Sleman
- 2020: PSIS Semarang

Senior career*
Years	Team	Apps	(Gls)
2021–2026	PSIS Semarang	36	(0)
2026–	Persiku Kudus	2	(0)
- * Club domestic league appearances and goals as of 20 September 2026

Ahmad Syiha Buddin (born 5 April 2001) is an Indonesian professional footballer who plays as a centre-back for Championship club Persiku Kudus. He is also a soldier in the Indonesian Navy.

== Career ==
=== PSIS Semarang ===
He was signed for PSIS Semarang to play in Liga 1 in the 2021 season. Syiha made his debut on 6 February 2022 in a match against Persik Kediri at the Kapten I Wayan Dipta Stadium, Gianyar.

== Career statistics ==
As of 12 September 2026

Club	Season	League			Cup		Continental		Other		Total	
Club	Season	Division	Apps	Goals	Apps	Goals	Apps	Goals	Apps	Goals	Apps	Goals
PSIS Semarang	2021–22	Liga 1	3	0	0	0	–		0	0	3	0
PSIS Semarang	2022–23	Liga 1	3	0	0	0	–		2 (Note: Appearances in Indonesia President's Cup.)	0	5	0
PSIS Semarang	2023–24	Liga 1	8	0	0	0	–		0	0	8	0
PSIS Semarang	2024–25	Liga 1	11	0	0	0	–		0	0	11	0
PSIS Semarang	2025–26	Championship	11	0	0	0	–		0	0	11	0
Persiku Kudus	2026–27	Championship	1	0	0	0	–		0	0	1	0
Career total			37	0	0	0	–		2	0	39	0
