= Mauricio Salazar =

Chilean footballer (born 1979)

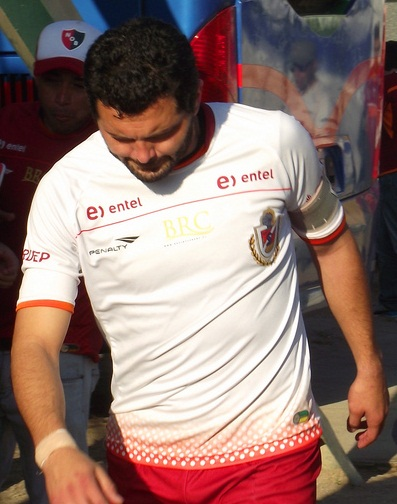

Personal information
- Full name: Mauricio Javier Salazar Durán
- Date of birth: 21 September 1979 (age 47)
- Place of birth: La Serena, Chile
- Height: 1.76 m (5 ft 9 1/2 in)
- Position: Striker

Youth career
- Academia Santa Inés
- Deportes La Serena

Senior career*
Years	Team	Apps	(Gls)
2004–2008	Deportes La Serena	17	(8)
2004–2006	→ Huachipato (loan)	59	(7)
2008–2009	Audax Italiano	30	(1)
2009–2018	Deportes La Serena	252	(62)
- * Club domestic league appearances and goals

Mauricio Javier Salazar Durán (born 21 September 1979) is a Chilean retired footballer who played as a striker.

== Career ==
As a youth player, Salazar was with Academia de Fútbol Santa Inés, before joining Deportes La Serena.

== Personal life ==
An idol of Deportes La Serena, he was nicknamed Ingeniero ( Engineer). Similarly, he received as mining engineer at the University of La Serena.

=== Controversies ===
In October 2024, Salazar and his partner, the former footballer Marcelo Caro, were charged with scam by also former footballer Jorge Vargas, regarding business in La Serena, Chile.
