= Mario Maldonado =

Chilean footballer and manager (born 1949)

Personal information
- Full name: Mario Óscar Maldonado Ceballos
- Date of birth: 14 December 1949 (age 76)
- Place of birth: Iquique, Chile
- Position: Centre-back

Youth career
- 1963–1964: Los Cóndores
- 1965–1966: Rubén Donoso
- 1965–1967: Iquique (city team)
- 1967–1969: Universidad Católica

Senior career*
Years	Team	Apps	(Gls)
1969–1973	Universidad Católica	119	(0)
1974–1975	Unión Española	23	(1)
1975–1980	Tecos		
1980	Universidad Católica		
1980–1986	Coyotes Neza		

International career
1969	Chile U20	2	(0)

Managerial career
- 1986: Cachorros Neza
- 1987–1989: Irapuato
- 1989–1991: Tecos
- 1993: Deportes Iquique
- 1994–1995: Querétaro
- 1995–1997: Tecomán
- * Club domestic league appearances and goals

Mario Óscar Maldonado Ceballos (born 14 December 1949) is a Chilean football manager and former professional footballer who played as a centre-back for clubs in Chile and Mexico.

== Club career ==
Born in Iquique, he began to play football at the age of 13, representing the local clubs Los Cóndores and Rubén Donoso as well as the Iquique city team from 1965 to 1967. Then, he moved to Santiago and joined Universidad Católica youth system, making his debut in the 1969 season, where he made ten appearances.

After playing for Universidad Católica, he played for Unión Española (1974–75), with whom he became the runner-up in the 1975 Copa Libertadores.

In 1975 he moved to Mexico and joined Tecos, recommended by his compatriots Fernando Riera and Carlos Reinoso. In the club, he also coincided with his compatriot Miguel Ángel Gamboa. With a brief stint with Universidad Católica in 1980, he also played for Coyotes Neza until 1986.

As an anecdote, he became the team captain in all clubs where he played.

== International career ==
He took part of the Chile national team at youth level in 1969, when Fernando Riera was the manager. He made two appearances in friendly matches with views to the 1974 FIFA World Cup qualifiers.

At senior level, he took part of the Chile national team in friendly international tournaments and training sessions when Raúl Pino and Rudi Gutendorf were the managers.

== Coaching career ==
Following his retirement, he began his career with Cachorros Neza. Next, he coached Irapuato, Tecos, Querétaro and Tecomán in Mexico.

He also had a stint with Deportes Iquique in the 1993 Primera División de Chile.

== Other works ==
He got a Bachelor's Degree in Tourism at the UAG and worked at the same university as Director of Marketing Department.

== Personal life ==
His father was a stevedore and his mother was a housewife.
