= Maciej Dołęga =

Polish footballer

Personal information
- Date of birth: 22 January 1976 (age 50)
- Place of birth: Przemyśl, Poland
- Height: 1.77 m (5 ft 10 in)
- Position: Forward

Senior career*
Years	Team	Apps	(Gls)
-1996	Czuwaj Przemyśl		
1997	Cracovia		
1997	Czuwaj Przemyśl		
1998	Stomil Olsztyn	14	(1)
1999	Warmia Olsztyn		
1999-2000	Pogoń Szczecin	10	(0)
- KSZO Ostrowiec Świętokrzyski
2003	Persib Bandung		
2004	Drwęca Nowe Miasto Lubawskie		
- * Club domestic league appearances and goals

Maciej Dołęga (born ) is a Polish former footballer who is last known to have played as a forward for Drwęca Nowe Miasto Lubawskie.

== Career ==
Before the second half of 1997/98, Dołęga signed for Polish top flight side Stomil Olsztyn after playing for Czuwaj Przemyśl in the Polish lower leagues.

Before the 2003 season, he signed for Persib Bandung, Indonesia's most successful club, where he became their first foreign scorer.

Before the second half of 2003/04, he signed for Drwęca Nowe Miasto Lubawskie in the Polish lower leagues.
