= Mario Quiñones =

Chilean footballer

Personal information
- Full name: Mario Alberto Quiñones Alarcón
- Date of birth: 20 May 1979 (age 47)
- Place of birth: Chile
- Height: 1.70 m (5 ft 7 in)
- Position: Defender

Senior career*
| Years | Team | Apps | (Gls) |
| 1999–2002 | Coquimbo Unido | 71 | (0) |
| 2003–2004 | Fernández Vial | | |
| 2005 | PSMS Medan | | |
- * Club domestic league appearances and goals

Mario Alberto Quiñones Alarcón (born 20 May 1979), sometimes referred as Mario Quiñonez, is a Chilean former professional footballer who played as a defender for clubs in Chile and Indonesia.

== Career ==
Quiñones played in his country of birth for Coquimbo Unido in the top division from 1999 to 2002 and for Fernández Vial in the Primera B from 2003 to 2004.

Abroad, he played in Indonesia for PSMS Medan, with whom he won the 2005 Piala Emas Bang Yos (Gold Cup Bang Yos). alongside his compatriots Luis Hicks and Alejandro Tobar.

== Post-retirement ==
Quiñones has worked as an adviser of football players in managing of contracts. He made links with Universidad Católica and the ANFP in the area of marketing.

== Honours ==
PSMS Medan

- Piala Emas Bang Yos (Gold Cup Bang Yos): 2005
