= Juan Páez =

Chilean footballer and manager (born 1950)

Personal information
- Full name: Juan Antonio Páez Cepeda
- Date of birth: 13 February 1950 (age 76)
- Place of birth: Santiago, Chile
- Height: 1.75 m (5 ft 9 in)
- Position: Centre-back

Youth career
- Juventud Universitaria

Senior career*
Years	Team	Apps	(Gls)
1969–1970	Universidad Católica		
1971–1972	Ferroviarios		
1973–1975	Palestino	71	(4)
1975–1979	Lota Schwager	110	(7)
1980–1981	Cobreloa	47	(8)
1982	Regional Atacama	28	(0)
1983	Santiago Wanderers	7	(0)
1984	Green Cross-Temuco	11	(0)
1985	Deportes Concepción		
1986	Curicó Unido		
1987	Soinca Bata		
1987	Coquimbo Unido		

Managerial career
- 1991: Soinca Bata (youth)
- 1992: Municipal Talagante
- 1993: Deportes Melipilla
- 1994: Provincial Osorno
- 1995: Deportes Iquique
- 1997: Deportes Linares
- 1998: San Antonio Unido
- 1998–1999: Magallanes
- 2000–2001: San Antonio Unido
- 2003–2004: Persib Bandung
- 2007: San Antonio Unido
- * Club domestic league appearances and goals

Juan Antonio Páez Cepeda (born 13 February 1950) is a Chilean football manager and former footballer who played as a centre-back.

== Playing career ==
Born in Santiago, as a child Páez was with Juventud Universitaria and next he moved to Universidad Católica. After playing for Ferroviarios in Segunda División, he played in the Primera División for Palestino, Lota Schwager, Cobreloa, Regional Atacama, Santiago Wanderers, Green Cross-Temuco and Deportes Concepción.

With Palestino, he won the 1975 Copa Chile, making 6 appearances in the tournament. At league level, he made 71 appearances and scored 4 goals from 1973 to 1975.

Lota Schwager, with Páez in the squad, got the best season in its history after reached the sixth place in the 1977 Primera División. At league level, he made 110 appearances and scored 7 goals from 1975 to 1979.

He played for Cobreloa in 1980 and 1981, making 47 appearances and scoring 8 goals and winning the league title in 1980. In addition, he took part in the 1981 Copa Libertadores, where Cobreloa was the runner-up after being defeated by Flamengo.

In his last years as footballer, he played in the Segunda División for Curicó Unido, Soinca Bata and Coquimbo Unido.

== Coaching career ==
Páez mainly developed his career in Chile at both the second and the third divisions. San Antonio Unido was the club what he coached more times: 1998, 2000–01 and 2007. In the Primera División, he led Deportes Melipilla in 1993.

Abroad, Páez had a stint with the Indonesian club Persib Bandung (2003–04), saving it from the relegation to the lower division. In the club, he coached his compatriots Alejandro Tobar, Claudio Lizama, Julio Lopez and Angelo Espinosa.

== Personal life ==
He is the younger brother of the Chilean former international footballer Guillermo Páez.

== Honours ==
=== Player ===
Palestino

- Copa Chile: 1975

Cobreloa

- Primera División: 1980
