= Gabriel Vilches =

Chilean footballer (born 1985)

Personal information
- Full name: Gabriel Alejandro Vilches Sandoval
- Date of birth: 1 May 1985 (age 41)
- Place of birth: Peñalolén, Santiago, Chile
- Height: 1.72 m (5 ft 8 in)
- Position: Midfielder

Youth career
- Real Los Héroes
- Unión Española

Senior career*
Years	Team	Apps	(Gls)
2004–2008	Unión Española	9	(0)
2005–2006	→ Trasandino (loan)		
2007	→ Trasandino (loan)		
2008	→ Trasandino (loan)		
2009	Unión San Felipe		
2009	Unión La Calera		
2011–2012	San Luis	11	(0)
2012	Iberia	13	(1)
2013–2014	Coquimbo Unido	11	(0)
- * Club domestic league appearances and goals

Gabriel Alejandro Vilches Sandoval (born 1 May 1985) is a Chilean former professional footballer who played as a midfielder for Trasandino in three different stints (2005–2008), Unión Española (2008), Unión San Felipe (2009), Unión La Calera (2009–2010), San Luis de Quillota (2011–2012), Iberia (2012), and Coquimbo Unido.
