= Cristián Molina =

Chilean footballer (born 1978)

Personal information
- Full name: Cristián José Molina Varela
- Date of birth: 19 March 1978 (age 48)
- Place of birth: Antofagasta, Chile
- Position: Striker

Senior career*
Years	Team	Apps	(Gls)
1998-2003	Deportes Antofagasta		(36)
2004	Universidad de Chile	1	(0)
2004–2005	Persib Bandung		(2)
2006–2007	Deportes Antofagasta	5	(1)
2007	Deportes La Serena	2	(0)
Total			(39)
- * Club domestic league appearances and goals

Cristián José Molina Varela (born 19 March 1978) is a Chilean former footballer who played as a striker.

== Career ==
In his career, Molina mainly played for Deportes Antofagasta. In 2004, he joined Universidad de Chile, where he just made one appearance. In the second half 2004, he moved to Indonesia and joined Persib Bandung. He returned to Chile in 2005 and played for Deportes Antofagasta (2006–07) and Deportes La Serena (2007).

== Personal life ==
Following his retirement, he switched to work in the mining industry in Antofagasta.

== Honours ==
Universidad de Chile

- Primera División de Chile: 2004 Apertura
