= Mario Núñez =

Chilean footballer (born 1976)

Personal information
- Full name: Mario Antonio Núñez Villarreal
- Date of birth: 2 March 1976 (age 50)
- Place of birth: Rancagua, Chile
- Height: 1.70 m (5 ft 7 in)
- Position: Forward

Youth career
- O'Higgins

Senior career*
Years	Team	Apps	(Gls)
1995–1999	O'Higgins	102	(64)
2000	Universidad Católica	9	(6)
2000	Independiente	3	(0)
2001	Universidad Católica	18	(6)
2001	Litex Lovech	0	(0)
2002	Neftochimic Burgas	9	(3)
2002–2003	Palestino	34	(17)
2003–2004	Rangers	28	(6)
2005–2006	O'Higgins	44	(18)
2007–2010	Provincial Osorno	89	(37)
2009	→ Coquimbo Unido (loan)	32	(9)
2011	Magallanes	17	(0)
Total		385	(166)

International career
2000	Chile	7	(2)
- * Club domestic league appearances and goals

Mario Antonio Núñez Villarreal (born 2 March 1976) is a Chilean former footballer well remembered for his spell at O'Higgins. He played as a striker.

== Club career ==
A product of the O'Higgins youth system, Núñez is one of the historical goalscorers of the club. As a member of them, he got promotion to the 1999 Primera División after being the runner-up in the 1998 Primera B alongside players such as Darío Gálvez, Pedro Rivera, Rolando Azas, among others. In the 1999 season, he became the top goalscorer of the league.

Abroad, he had stints with Independiente in Argentina and Litex Lovech in Bulgaria. He also had trials with both Central Córdoba and Sarmiento in 1997 and the Spanish side Salamanca in 2000.

His last club was Magallanes in 2011.

== International career ==
Núñez made seven appearances and scored two goals for the Chile national team in 2000. Along with Chile, he won the Copa Ciudad de Valparaíso.

== Personal life ==
His nickname is Oso (Bear), but he doesn't know its origin.

His son, Daniel, is a professional tennis player.

== Post-retirement ==
Núñez worked in the mining industry at El Teniente.

Settled in Rancagua, Núñez coaches amateur and school football teams and owns a football academy.

== Honours ==
Provincial Osorno

- Primera B: 2007

Chile

- Copa Ciudad de Valparaíso: 2000

Individual

- Primera B de Chile Top-Scorer: 1998, 2007
- Chilean Primera División top scorer: 1999
- Chilean Primera División Ideal Team: 1999
- IFFHS World's Best Top Division Goal Scorer Second place: 1999
