= Mariusz Mucharski =

Polish footballer

Personal information
- Date of birth: 8 September 1970 (age 56)
- Place of birth: Kielce, Poland
- Height: 1.88 m (6 ft 2 in)
- Position: Goalkeeper

Team information
- Current team: KSZO Ostrowiec Świętokrzyski (interim goalkeeping coach)

Senior career*
Years	Team	Apps	(Gls)
1989–1993	Korona Kielce		
1993–1997	Wisła Kraków	38	(0)
1999	Odra Opole		
2000	Korona Kielce		
2001–2002	Pogoń Staszów		
2003	Persib Bandung		
2003–2005	AKS Busko-Zdrój		
2005–2006	Zenit Chmielnik		
2006–2007	Bucovia Bukowa		
2007–2008	Orlicz Suchedniów		
- * Club domestic league appearances and goals

Mariusz Mucharski (born 8 September 1970) is a Polish former professional footballer who played as a goalkeeper. Following retirement, he began working as a goalkeeping coach, which is a role he currently holds at III liga club KSZO Ostrowiec Świętokrzyski on an interim basis.
