= Miguel Ángel Gamboa =

Chilean footballer (born 1951)

Miguel Angel Gamboa
Personal information
- Full name: Miguel Ángel Luis Gamboa Pedemonte
- Date of birth: 21 June 1951 (age 75)
- Place of birth: Santiago, Chile
- Height: 1.75 m (5 ft 9 in)
- Position: Forward

Senior career*
Years	Team	Apps	(Gls)
1970–1972	Audax Italiano		
1973	Lota Schwager		
1974–1975	Colo Colo		
1976–1978	Tecos		
1978–1980	América		
1981–1982	Universidad de Chile		
1983–1985	Deportivo Neza		

International career
1974–1983	Chile	18	(6)

Managerial career
- 2009: Rapanui
- 2009: Chile (beach soccer)
- * Club domestic league appearances and goals

Miguel Ángel Luis Gamboa Pedemonte (born June 21, 1951) is a former football striker from Chile.

== Career ==
He represented his native country at the 1982 FIFA World Cup, wearing the number 21 jersey. He also played for several clubs in Chile, including Universidad de Chile and Colo Colo, and in Mexico for Tecos UAG, where he coincided with his compatriot Mario Maldonado, and América.

== Post-retirement ==
Gamboa has coached the Rapanui national football team. He also led the Chile beach soccer team in the 2009 South American Championship, where he called up some retired professional footballers such as Rodrigo Sanhueza, Rodrigo Cuevas, Cristian Olivares, Jorge Torres and Carlos Medina.

He has taken part in friendly matches along with historical players of Universidad de Chile such as Cristián Castañeda, Patricio Mardones, Martín Gálvez, among others.
