= Alejandro Carrasco =

Chilean footballer (born 1978)

Personal information
- Full name: Alejandro Ulises Carrasco Orellana
- Date of birth: 23 March 1978 (age 48)
- Place of birth: Santiago, Chile
- Height: 1.70 m (5 ft 7 in)
- Position: Midfielder

Youth career
- Audax Italiano

Senior career*
Years	Team	Apps	(Gls)
1995–2004	Audax Italiano	105	(12)
2003	→ Skoda Xanthi (loan)	5	(0)
2005	Colo-Colo	7	(0)
2005–2008	Deportes Melipilla	67	(11)
2006	→ Santiago Wanderers (loan)	20	(2)
2008–2014	Palestino	104	(4)
2014–2015	San Luis	33	(0)
2015–2016	Everton	33	(0)
Total		374	(29)

International career
1997	Chile U20		
- * Club domestic league appearances and goals

Alejandro Ulises Carrasco Orellana (born 23 March 1978) is a Chilean former footballer who played as a midfielder.

His last club was Everton.

== Club career ==
Born in Santiago, Carrasco began playing professional football with Audax Italiano. He helped the club earn promotion from the Chilean second division during the 1995 season. He would play for Audax Italiano in the Chilean first division over the next 7.5 seasons.

Carrasco moved to Greece in July 2003, joining Greek first division side Skoda Xanthi, but played in only five league matches before leaving in December 2003.

He returned to Audax Italiano for the 2004 season, before moving to Chilean first division sides Colo-Colo, Deportes Melipilla, Santiago Wanderers and Palestino.

== International career ==
Carrasco represented Chile at under-20 level in the 1997 South American Championship.

He was called up to the Chile national team for the friendly matches against Turkey in 2002 and Costa Rica in 2003, but he didn't make his debut.

== Personal life ==
He is known by his nickname Bocha.

Following his retirement, Carrasco has worked in services for the tyre vulcanisation.

== Honours ==
=== Player ===
Palestino

- Primera División de Chile (1): Runner-up 2008 Clausura
