= 1999 Campeonato Nacional Primera División =

Campeonato Nacional Copa Banco del Estado
- Dates: 27 February – 16 December 1999
- Champions: Universidad de Chile (10th title)
- Relegated: Rangers; Deportes La Serena; Deportes Iquique (relegation play-off); Cobresal (relegation play-off)
- 2000 Copa Libertadores: Universidad de Chile; Universidad Católica (2nd place); Cobreloa (3rd place)
- Matches: 352
- Goals: 1,126 (3.2 per match)
- Top goalscorer: Mario Núñez (34)
- Total attendance: 2,209,345
- Average attendance: 6,276

The 1999 Campeonato Nacional was Chilean first tier's 67th season which Universidad de Chile reached its tenth professional title. The relegated teams were Rangers, Deportes La Serena, Deportes Iquique and Cobresal. The tournament was played in two stages, the 8 first places qualified to the Championship Stage, where they carry over their points from the previous stage, but divided by four. For the Relegation Stage the complete points were carried over.

== First stage ==
Pos	Team	Pld	W	D	L	GF	GA	GD	Pts	Qualification
1	Universidad de Chile	30	23	6	1	66	27	+39	75	Qualified to Championship Stage
2	Universidad Católica	30	19	7	4	67	31	+36	64	Qualified to Championship Stage
3	Cobreloa	30	16	8	6	62	29	+33	56	Qualified to Championship Stage
4	Colo-Colo	30	13	10	7	45	37	+8	49	Qualified to Championship Stage
5	Audax Italiano	30	11	8	11	42	37	+5	41	Qualified to Championship Stage
6	Huachipato	30	11	8	11	46	47	−1	41	Qualified to Championship Stage
7	Palestino	30	11	6	13	48	53	−5	39	Qualified to Championship Stage
8	Santiago Morning	30	10	8	12	41	41	0	38	Qualified to Championship Stage
9	Deportes Puerto Montt	30	10	8	12	52	55	−3	38	Qualified to Relegation Stage
10	O'Higgins	30	11	5	14	47	59	−12	38	Qualified to Relegation Stage
11	Deportes Concepción	30	9	8	13	38	41	−3	35	Qualified to Relegation Stage
12	Cobresal	30	9	8	13	39	45	−6	35	Qualified to Relegation Stage
13	Deportes Iquique	30	8	8	14	37	47	−10	32	Qualified to Relegation Stage
14	Coquimbo Unido	30	6	10	14	44	70	−26	28	Qualified to Relegation Stage
15	Rangers	30	6	6	18	26	52	−26	24	Qualified to Relegation Stage
16	Deportes La Serena	30	4	12	14	30	59	−29	24	Qualified to Relegation Stage

Home \ Away	AUD	CLO	CSA	COL	COQ	DCO	DIQ	HUA	DLS	OHI	PAL	DPM	RAN	SMO	UCA	UCH
Audax		1–0	1–0	1–3	4–2	2–1	0–0	0–1	2–0	0–2	3–1	6–1	2–2	2–2	1–1	1–2
Cobreloa	1–0		3–1	1–1	9–1	2–0	2–0	3–0	3–0	6–0	3–2	2–2	2–0	4–0	0–2	0–1
Cobresal	0–0	2–2		2–2	4–0	1–0	1–1	3–2	3–1	4–0	0–0	2–1	2–1	0–2	3–3	3–3
Colo-Colo	3–1	0–1	3–0		2–1	1–0	0–0	3–2	2–2	0–0	1–0	3–2	1–0	3–3	0–2	5–2
Coquimbo	0–1	0–0	2–1	1–3		1–0	1–0	1–1	3–3	0–0	1–5	4–3	4–0	0–0	2–3	0–2
Concepción	3–3	1–1	2–0	0–1	3–3		2–0	1–3	2–0	0–1	2–0	1–1	2–1	1–0	0–2	1–1
Iquique	1–1	1–4	2–0	1–1	3–3	2–0		1–3	2–0	2–2	1–2	5–3	3–1	1–0	2–0	1–2
Huachipato	1–1	1–3	1–1	2–0	4–2	1–3	1–2		2–2	2–1	3–2	1–1	1–0	3–3	2–4	1–1
La Serena	1–0	0–0	1–0	1–1	2–2	1–1	2–0	0–3		0–4	4–4	2–2	0–0	2–3	1–5	0–2
O'Higgins	5–3	2–1	1–0	1–2	3–1	1–3	3–2	0–1	1–3		1–4	2–2	2–0	1–0	2–5	0–3
Palestino	0–1	1–1	2–1	1–1	2–2	2–1	2–1	0–1	0–0	4–2		2–3	3–1	0–3	1–4	0–5
P. Montt	0–2	4–1	0–1	2–0	2–4	1–1	3–0	2–0	3–0	1–1	1–3		2–1	2–0	2–0	1–2
Rangers	0–2	3–3	2–0	1–1	2–1	1–0	2–1	1–0	1–1	0–2	2–1	1–3		0–1	1–6	1–1
S. Morning	1–0	0–1	1–3	2–1	5–0	2–4	0–0	1–1	3–1	3–2	1–2	2–2	1–0		0–1	1–2
U. Católica	1–0	1–2	4–1	2–1	1–1	1–1	4–1	3–2	2–0	2–1	1–2	3–0	3–1	0–0		1–1
U. Chile	2–1	2–1	2–0	3–0	2–1	5–2	2–1	2–0	3–0	5–4	2–0	3–0	1–0	2–1	0–0	

Legend: Blue = home team win; Yellow = draw; Red = away team win.

== Relegation stage ==
Pos	Team	Pld	W	D	L	GF	GA	GD	Pts	Qualification or relegation
9	O'Higgins	44	18	8	18	77	86	−9	62	
10	Deportes Concepción	44	16	12	16	60	59	+1	60	
11	Coquimbo Unido	44	15	14	15	77	84	−7	59	
12	Deportes Puerto Montt	44	14	12	18	71	84	−13	54	
13	Cobresal	44	14	11	19	64	74	−10	53	Plays promotion/relegation play-offs
14	Deportes Iquique	44	13	12	19	65	72	−7	51	Plays promotion/relegation play-offs
15	Rangers	44	10	8	26	52	78	−26	38	Relegated to Primera B
16	Deportes La Serena	44	7	12	25	53	97	−44	33	Relegated to Primera B

Home \ Away	CSA	COQ	DCO	DIQ	DLS	DPM	OHI	RAN
Cobresal		3–1	4–2	2–3	5–2	2–2	1–3	0–1
Coquimbo	6–0		3–3	2–2	2–1	2–0	4–0	3–1
Concepción	3–1	2–2		1–0	1–0	0–1	1–1	2–1
Iquique	0–0	1–1	1–1		5–0	4–0	3–1	3–2
La Serena	2–3	0–1	0–1	5–3		1–2	4–6	4–1
P. Montt	1–1	0–1	3–2	2–1	1–3		1–1	3–3
O'Higgins	2–1	1–3	0–1	5–2	3–1	3–2		2–1
Rangers	1–2	0–2	1–2	3–0	4–0	5–1	2–2	

Legend: Blue = home team win; Yellow = draw; Red = away team win.

== Championship stage ==
Pos	Team	Pld	W	D	L	GF	GA	GD	BP	Pts	Qualification
1	Universidad de Chile	14	8	4	2	90	43	+47	19	47	Champions & qualified to 2000 Copa Libertadores
2	Universidad Católica	14	8	4	2	102	50	+52	16	44	Qualified to 2000 Copa Libertadores
3	Cobreloa	14	8	2	4	94	49	+45	14	40	Qualified to 2000 Copa Libertadores
4	Colo-Colo	14	5	3	6	62	57	+5	12	30	
5	Santiago Morning	14	3	6	5	65	66	−1	10	25	
6	Palestino	14	4	3	7	73	88	−15	10	25	
7	Audax Italiano	14	3	4	7	59	60	−1	10	23	
8	Huachipato	14	2	4	8	62	79	−17	10	20	

Home \ Away	AUD	CLO	COL	HUA	PAL	SMO	UCA	UCH
Audax		1–2	0–1	3–1	1–1	2–1	2–2	0–2
Cobreloa	1–0		4–0	3–0	7–2	1–3	2–1	1–1
Colo-Colo	2–1	3–1		1–1	1–3	3–3	0–1	0–1
Huachipato	0–0	1–1	3–0		3–2	0–2	0–4	1–2
Palestino	1–2	1–0	1–1	3–2		2–4	2–2	1–3
S. Morning	2–2	3–5	0–2	2–2	1–2		2–3	0–0
U. Católica	3–1	3–1	1–0	6–1	5–3	1–1		1–1
U. Chile	4–2	1–3	0–3	3–1	1–0	0–0	3–2	

Legend: Blue = home team win; Yellow = draw; Red = away team win.

== Topscorers ==
Pos	Name	Team	Goals
1	(Chile) Mario Núñez	O'Higgins	34
2	(Chile) Pedro González	Universidad de Chile	28
3	(Paraguay) Domingo Arévalo	Deportes Puerto Montt	25
4	(Argentina) José Luis Díaz	Audax Italiano	23
	(Chile) Jaime González	O'Higgins	23
6	(Paraguay) Raúl Duarte	Huachipato	22
	(Chile) Sebastián Rozental	Universidad Católica	22

== Promotion/relegation play-offs ==
19 December 1999	Provincial Osorno	4 – 3	Cobresal	Estadio Parque Schott
	Muñoz 41'; Olea 65' 66'; Soto 83'		Retamal 24' 69'; Nuñez 59'	Referee: Eduardo Gamboa

19 December 1999	Everton	1 – 0	Deportes Iquique	Estadio Sausalito
	Riep 30'			Referee: Mario Sánchez

22 December 1999	Cobresal	2 – 3	Provincial Osorno	Estadio El Cobre
	Cisternas 15'; Nuñez 70'		Olea 45'; Díaz 51'; Muñoz 60'	Referee: Rubén Selman

22 December 1999	Deportes Iquique	0 – 1	Everton	Estadio Tierra de Campeones
	Pereyra 7'			Referee: Mario Sánchez
