= Osvaldo Gullace =

Chilean-Argentine footballer

Personal information
- Full name: Osvaldo Alfredo Gullace Morales
- Date of birth: 1 April 1979 (age 47)
- Place of birth: Santiago, Chile
- Position: Midfielder

Youth career
- 1989–1996: Huracán Las Heras

Senior career*
| Years | Team | Apps | (Gls) |
| 1997 | Coquimbo Unido | 8 | (0) |
| 1998 | Santiago Morning | | (1) |
| 1999 | Coquimbo Unido | 12 | (0) |
| 2001 | Pachuca | | |
| 2001 | Barcelona B | | |
| 2002 | Santiago Morning | 10 | (1) |
| 2003–2004 | Luján de Cuyo | 15 | (3) |
| 2004–2005 | Aldosivi | 19 | (4) |
| 2005 | Sportivo Desamparados | 14 | (3) |
| 2006 | Santamarina | 28 | (6) |
| 2007 | Sportivo Patria | 12 | (1) |
| 2007–2008 | Deportivo Maipú | 18 | (1) |
| 2009 | Coquimbo Unido | 25 | (3) |
| 2011–2012 | Huracán Las Heras | 28 | (7) |
| 2012 | Deportivo Maipú | 15 | (4) |
| 2013 | Huracán Las Heras | 14 | (3) |
| 2013–2014 | Gutiérrez | 10 | (0) |
| 2014 | Leonardo Murialdo | | |
| 2017 | Fray Luis Beltrán | | |
- * Club domestic league appearances and goals

Osvaldo Alfredo Gullace Morales (born 1 April 1979) is a Chilean-Argentine former footballer who played as a midfielder.

== Career ==
Born in Santiago, Chile, Gullace moved to Argentina at the age of ten and joined Huracán Las Heras youth ranks.

Back in Chile, he played for Coquimbo Unido in the Primera División in both 1997 and 1999, with a stint with Santiago Morning in 1998, with whom he got promotion to the top division. He returned to play for them in the 2002 season as well as for Coquimbo Unido in the 2009 season.

After his first step in Chile, he had stints with Pachuca in Mexico and Barcelona B in Spain in 2001. In addition, he had trials with Celtic and Manchester United.

In Argentina, he had an extensive career, with successful stints with Aldosivi, with whom he had promotion to the Primera Nacional in 2004–05, and Huracán Las Heras, with whom he got promotion to the Torneo Argentino B in 2011.

After retiring in 2014 playing for club Leonardo Murialdo from Mendoza, Argentina, he returned to play for Club Atlético Fray Luis Beltrán in 2017 at the age of thirty-eight.

== Personal life ==
Gullace was born in Santiago, Chile, to an Argentine father and a Chilean mother. From his paternal line, he also is of Italian descent since his grandfather was Italian.
