= Claudio Lizama =

Chilean footballer (born 1973)

Personal information
- Full name: Claudio Mauricio Lizama Villegas
- Date of birth: 21 March 1973 (age 53)
- Place of birth: Providencia, Santiago, Chile
- Height: 1.72 m (5 ft 8 in)
- Positions: Left-back; centre-back

Youth career
- Universidad Católica

Senior career*
Years	Team	Apps	(Gls)
1991–1997	Universidad Católica	86	(1)
1993	→ Deportes Concepción (loan)	25	(3)
1998	Santiago Wanderers	7	(0)
1999–2000	Coquimbo Unido	41	(1)
2001	Deportes Puerto Montt	17	(1)
2002	Fernández Vial		(0)
2003–2004	Persib Bandung		(0)
2005	PSPS Pekanbaru		(1)
Total			(7)

International career
1993	Chile U20		
1995	Chile	1	(0)
1996	Chile U23	4	(0)
- * Club domestic league appearances and goals

Claudio Mauricio Lizama Villegas (born 21 March 1973) is a Chilean former professional footballer who played as a defender for clubs in Chile and Indonesia.

== Club career ==
A product of Universidad Católica youth system, as a member of the team he won the 1993 Copa Interamericana, 1995 Copa Chile and the 1997 Apertura of the Primera División, in addition to be the runner-up in the 1993 Copa Libertadores.

In Chilean Primera División, he also played for Deportes Concepción (loan on 1993), Santiago Wanderers (1998), Coquimbo Unido (1999–2000) and Deportes Puerto Montt (2001). In Chilean Primera B, he played for Fernández Vial (2002).

Abroad, he played in Indonesia for Persib Bandung in 2003–04, where he coincided with compatriots such as Rodrigo Lemunao, Alejandro Tobar and the coach Juan Páez, and for PSPS Pekanbaru in 2005, where he scored a goal.

== International career ==
Lizama represented Chile at under-20 level in 1993 alongside players such as Francisco Rojas, Claudio Villan and Marcelo Salas. At under 23-level, he represented Chile in the 1996 Pre-Olympic Tournament. Previously, he had represented the Chile senior team in a 2–0 win versus Canada in 11 October 1995.

== Personal life ==
Lizama started a door manufacturing company.

== Honours ==
Universidad Católica

- Chilean Primera División: 1997 Apertura
- Copa Chile: 1995 Copa Chile
- Copa Interamericana: 1993
