= Marcelo Caro =

Chilean footballer (born 1971)

Personal information
- Full name: Marcelo Osvaldo Caro Cubillos
- Date of birth: 22 September 1971 (age 55)
- Place of birth: La Serena, Chile
- Height: 1.76 m (5 ft 9 in)
- Position: Forward

Youth career
- 1982–1990: Universidad Católica

Senior career*
Years	Team	Apps	(Gls)
1989–1994	Universidad Católica	17	(1)
1992	→ Huachipato (loan)	17	(4)
1995	Coquimbo Unido	27	(11)
1996	Universidad Católica	10	(0)
1997–1999	Coquimbo Unido	49	(11)
1999	Deportes Concepción	16	(4)
2000	Deportes Antofagasta	15	(8)
2000	Audax Italiano	11	(5)
2001	Palestino	10	(3)
2002	Audax Italiano	3	(0)
2002	Charlotte Eagles	2	(0)
2002–2003	Palestino	10	(1)
2004–2007	Deportes La Serena	72	(7)
Total		259	(55)

International career
1991	Chile U20		

Managerial career
- 2012: Deportes La Serena
- * Club domestic league appearances and goals

Marcelo Osvaldo Caro Cubillos (born 22 September 1971) is a Chilean former football manager and player who played as a forward. Besides Chile, he played in the United States.

== Career ==
A product of Universidad Católica, Caro came to the youth system in 1982 and made his professional debut in 1990. As a member of them, he took part in both the 1993 Copa Libertadores, where they were the runners-up, and the 1994 Copa Interamericana, where they were the champions.

He played almost his entire career in the Chilean Primera División. Besides Universidad Católica, he played for Huachipato, Coquimbo Unido, where he coincided with his teammate in Universidad Católica, Jorge Vargas, Deportes Concepción, Audax Italiano, Palestino and Deportes La Serena, where he retired.

In the Primera B, he played for Deportes Antofagasta in 2000.

Abroad, he had a stint with Charlotte Eagles in the 2002 USL A-League.

At international level, he represented Chile U20 in the 1991 South American Championship.

== Post-retirement ==
Caro has served as technical director of Deportes La Serena. As the head coach, he led them in the 2012 Torneo Clausura, where they were relegated to the Primera B.

Caro got a degree in business management and has worked for institutions such as Caja Los Andes, a compensation fund, and Cámara Chilena de la Construcción, an association of entrepreneurs in the building sector.

=== Controversies ===
In October 2024, Caro and his partner, the former footballer Mauricio Salazar, were charged with scam by also former footballer Jorge Vargas, regarding business in La Serena, Chile.
