= Rolando Azas =

Paraguayan footballer

Personal information
- Full name: Rolando Aníbal Azas Velazco
- Date of birth: 22 January 1971 (age 55)
- Place of birth: Pilar, Ñeembucú, Paraguay
- Positions: Forward; defender

Youth career
- Capitán Bado

Senior career*
Years	Team	Apps	(Gls)
1986–1989	Capitán Bado		
1989–1991	Cerro Porteño		
1992	Oriente Petrolero		
1992	Libertad		
1993	Cobreloa	16	(3)
1994–1995	Provincial Osorno	57	(12)
1996	Regional Atacama	23	(4)
1997	Libertad		
1998–1999	O'Higgins	66	(9)
2000	Everton	11	(2)
2001	Chinese football		
2002	Santiago Morning	14	(0)
2004	Deportivo Quevedo		

Managerial career
- 2011–2012: Universidad Católica (youth)
- 2013: Deportivo Quevedo (assistant)
- 2014–2015: Delfín (assistant)
- 2016: Fuerza Amarilla (assistant)
- 2016–2017: Delfín (assistant)
- 2017: LDU Portoviejo (assistant)
- 2017–2018: Manta
- 2018–2019: Delfín (assistant)
- 2020–2021: Barcelona SC (assistant)
- 2022: Atlético Samborondón
- 2023–2024: Naranja Mekánica
- 2024: LDU Portoviejo (assistant)
- 2024: Delfín (assistant)
- 2025: Resistencia (assistant)
- * Club domestic league appearances and goals

Rolando Aníbal Azas Velazco (born 22 January 1971) is a Paraguayan football manager and former footballer who played as a forward and defender.

== Club career ==
Born in Pilar, Paraguay, Azas made his senior debut with the local club, Capitán Bado, aged 15, and later represented the Pilar city team. In 1989, he signed with Paraguayan giant Cerro Porteño. After a stint with Bolivian club Oriente Petrolero in 1992, he returned to his homeland with Libertad. He had another stint with Libertad in 1997.

Azas stood out in Chilean football, where he came in 1993 to Cobreloa. The next years, he played for Provincial Osorno, Regional Atacama, O'Higgins, Everton and Santiago Morning, mainly in the top level.

Azas also had a 7-month stint in Chinese football in 2001 and won the 2004 Ecuadorian Serie B with Deportivo Quevedo, his last club.

In 2001, Azas suffered a thrombosis in his left leg which accelerated his retirement.

== Style of play ==
Azas developed his career as a forward since his youth career until 1998 as player of O'Higgins. That season, he replaced a fellow defender and kept that position until his retirement.

== Coaching career ==
In 2011, Azas started a football academy for the Universidad Católica youth system in Osorno, Chile alongside the former Chilean footballer Carlos Cáceres.

Azas has mainly developed a career as an assistant coach for Ecuadorian clubs such as Delfín, Fuerza Amarilla, Barcelona, among others.

As head coach, Azas coached Manta in 2017–18, Atlético Samborondón in 2022 and Naranja Mekánica in 2023–24.

In 2025, Azas served as assistant coach of Hugo Ovelar in Paraguayan club Resistencia.
