= Norberto Ortega Sánchez =

Argentine footballer

Norberto Ortega Sánchez (born 24 September 1963 in Victoria (Buenos Aires), Argentina) is a former professional footballer who played as a midfielder for clubs in Argentina, Spain, Chile and Colombia.

== Career ==
Born in Victoria, Buenos Aires to a father from Almería, Spain, Ortega began playing football with Club Atlético Tigre. He had spells at San Lorenzo de Almagro and Racing Club de Avellaneda before buying out his contract from Racing so he could sign with the Segunda División's Elche CF in August 1989.

== Clubs ==
- San Lorenzo de Almagro
- Racing Club
- Elche
- Vélez Sársfield
- Talleres de Córdoba
- Argentinos Juniors
- Godoy Cruz de Mendoza
- Tigre
- Platense
- Deportivo Cali
- Coquimbo Unido
