= Copa Latina (beach soccer) =

- Founded: 1998
- Abolished: 2011
- Region: International (FIFA)
- Number of teams: 4
- Last champions: Uruguay (1st title)
- Most successful team(s): Brazil (9 titles)

The Copa Latina (English: Latin Cup) was an international beach soccer tournament that took place annually in Brazil between 1998 and 2011 (save for 2007 and 2008). Four teams took part which were invitees from Latin Europe or Latin America (with the exception of 2003 participant Canada, which nevertheless has a substantial Latin sub-region). First played in Vitória, the competition rotated between several cities. After the knockout format of the inaugural tournament, all subsequent editions featured a round-robin format.

Few nations won the tournament: Brazil dominated the event, winning nine titles; Chile, Portugal and Uruguay also won one title each.

== Venues ==
The following is a table showing when and where the Copa Latina has been held:

Year(s)	City
1998	Vitória
1999	São Paulo
2000	Salvador
2001–2004	Vitória
2005	Fortaleza
2006	Florianópolis
2009–2010	Rio Quente
2011	Rio de Janeiro

== Tournaments ==
No.	Year	Winners	Runners-up	Third place	Fourth place	Best player	Best goalkeeper	Top scorer(s)
1	1998	Brazil	Portugal	Spain	France	(Brazil) Neném	(Brazil) Paulo Sérgio	(Brazil) Neném
2	1999	Brazil	Portugal	Argentina	Spain	(Portugal) Madjer	(Argentina) Dardo Cortes	(Portugal) Alan, (Portugal) Madjer, (Brazil) Júnior
3	2000	Portugal	Spain	Brazil	Uruguay	(Portugal) Madjer	(Spain) Roberto Valeiro	(Portugal) Madjer
4	2001	Brazil	Portugal	Uruguay	Argentina	(Brazil) Juninho	(Uruguay) Loco	(Brazil) Júnior Negão
5	2002	Brazil	Portugal	Uruguay	Argentina	(Brazil) Júnior Negão	(Brazil) Robertinho	(Portugal) Madjer
6	2003	Brazil	Portugal	Argentina	Canada	(Brazil) Jorginho	(Portugal) João Carlos	(Portugal) Madjer
7	2004	Brazil	Spain	Uruguay	Argentina			(Brazil) Neném
8	2005	Brazil	Uruguay	Portugal	Argentina	(Brazil) Buru	(Uruguay) Diego Monserrat	(Portugal) Madjer
9	2006	Brazil	Argentina	Uruguay	Spain	(Spain) Amarelle		(Spain) Amarelle
10	2009	Brazil	Chile	Argentina	Uruguay	(Brazil) Benjamin	(Brazil) Mão	(Brazil) Daniel
11	2010	Chile	Brazil	Argentina	Uruguay	(Chile) Rodrigo Sanhueza	(Chile) Gonzalo Mall	(Brazil) Benjamin
12	2011	Uruguay	Brazil	Mexico	Argentina	(Brazil) Benjamin	(Brazil) Mão	(Brazil) Benjamin

== Medal summary ==
Rank	Nation	Gold	Silver	Bronze	Total
1	Brazil	9	2	1	12
2	Portugal	1	5	1	7
3	Uruguay	1	1	4	6
4	Chile	1	1	0	2
5	Spain	0	2	1	3
6	Argentina	0	1	4	5
7	Mexico	0	0	1	1
Totals (7 entries)		12	12	12	36
