= Iván Sepúlveda =

Chilean footballer (born 1978)

Personal information
- Full name: Iván Ulises Sepúlveda González
- Date of birth: 1 September 1978 (age 48)
- Place of birth: Rancagua, Chile
- Height: 1.73 m (5 ft 8 in)
- Position: Defender

Youth career
- O'Higgins

Senior career*
Years	Team	Apps	(Gls)
1998–2001	O'Higgins	62	(1)
2002	Santiago Wanderers	6	(0)
2003	Centauros Villavicencio		
2004–2005	Deportes Puerto Montt	37	(1)
2007	Deportes Melipilla	10	(1)
2007–2010	Curicó Unido	54	(1)
2010–2011	Lota Schwager		
- * Club domestic league appearances and goals

Iván Ulises Sepúlveda González (born 1 September 1978) is a Chilean former footballer who played as a defender for clubs in Chile and Colombia.

== Career ==
A product of O'Higgins youth system, Sepúlveda made his debut in the 1998 season, when the club got promotion to the 1999 Primera División de Chile, alongside players such as Mauricio Dinamarca, Roberto González, Alejandro Tobar, Mario Núñez, among others.

In Chilean Primera División, he also played for Santiago Wanderers, Deportes Puerto Montt, Deportes Melipilla and Curicó Unido.

In the second level, he also played for Curicó Unido, with whom he won the league title in 2008, and Lota Schwager.

Abroad, he had a stint with Colombian side Centauros Villavicencio in 2003.

== Honours ==
Curicó Unido

- Primera B de Chile: 2008
