= 2008 South American Beach Soccer Championship =

2008 FIFA Beach Soccer World Cup CONMEBOL qualifier
2008 South American Beach Soccer Championship

Tournament details
- Host country: Argentina
- Dates: 23–27 April
- Teams: 7 (from 1 confederation)
- Venue: 1 (in 1 host city)

Final positions
- Champions: Brazil (2nd title)
- Runners-up: Argentina
- Third place: Uruguay
- Fourth place: Venezuela

Tournament statistics
- Matches played: 13
- Goals scored: 118 (9.08 per match)

The 2008 FIFA Beach Soccer World Cup CONMEBOL qualifier, also later and commonly known as the 2008 South American Beach Soccer Championship, was the second Beach Soccer World Cup qualification championship for South America, held from 23–27 April in Buenos Aires, Argentina.

The qualifiers were not coordinated by CONMEBOL at the time. The event was organised by Beach Soccer Worldwide (BSWW), under the FIFA Beach Soccer World Cup Qualifier title. CONMEBOL began recognising the tournaments in 2013, under the title South American Beach Soccer Championship, also acknowledging the 2006–11 events as historic editions of the championship. CONMEBOL eventually began organising the qualifiers in 2017, under a new title.

Brazil won the championship for a second consecutive time, with Argentina finishing second and Uruguay winning the third place play of to finish third. The three nations moved on to play in the 2008 FIFA Beach Soccer World Cup in Marseille, France, from 17–27 July.

== Participating nations ==
- Argentina
- Brazil
- Chile
- Paraguay
- Peru
- Uruguay
- Venezuela

== Group stage ==
=== Group A ===
Team	Pts	Pld	W	W+	L	GF	GA	GD
Argentina	9	3	3	0	0	26	10	16
Venezuela	6	3	2	0	1	13	11	2
Chile	3	3	1	0	2	17	16	1
Peru	0	3	0	0	3	10	23	-13

2008-04-23

Chile	8 – 5	Peru

Buenos Aires

2008-04-23

Argentina	2 – 1	Venezuela

Buenos Aires

2008-04-24

Venezuela	5 – 4	Chile

Buenos Aires

2008-04-24

Peru	0 – 8	Argentina

Buenos Aires

2008-04-25

Venezuela	7 – 5	Peru

Buenos Aires

2008-04-25

Argentina	6 – 5	Chile

Buenos Aires

=== Group B ===
Team	Pts	Pld	W	W+	L	GF	GA	GD
Brazil	6	2	2	0	0	14	7	7
Uruguay	3	2	1	0	1	8	12	-4
Paraguay	0	2	0	0	2	8	11	-3

2008-04-23

Brazil	8 – 3	Uruguay

Buenos Aires

2008-04-24

Brazil	6 – 4	Paraguay

Buenos Aires

2008-04-23

Uruguay	5 – 4	Paraguay

Buenos Aires

== Knockout stage ==
Semi-finals
B1	Brazil	8
A2	Venezuela	3
A1	Argentina	5
B2	Uruguay	3

Final
SF1	Brazil	6
SF2	Argentina	1
3rd/4th-place match
SF1	Venezuela	1
SF2	Uruguay	5

=== Semi-finals ===
2008-04-26

Brazil	8 – 3	Venezuela

Buenos Aires

2008-04-26

Argentina	5 – 3	Uruguay

Buenos Aires

=== Third Place Play Off ===
2008-04-27

Venezuela	1 – 5	Uruguay

Buenos Aires

=== Final ===
2008-04-27

Brazil	6 – 1	Argentina

Buenos Aires

== Winners ==
(2008) FIFA Beach Soccer World Cup
Qualification (CONMEBOL) Winners:

Brazil
Second title

== Awards ==
Best Player
(Brazil) André
Top Scorer
(Argentina) Ezequiel Hilaire
7 goals
Best Goalkeeper
(Uruguay) Diego

== Final standings ==
Rank	Team
1	Brazil
2	Argentina
3	Uruguay
4	Venezuela
5	Chile
6	Paraguay
7	Peru
