= Darío Gálvez =

Chilean footballer

Personal information
- Full name: Darío del Carmen Gálvez Vargas
- Date of birth: 11 July 1975 (age 51)
- Place of birth: Quinta de Tilcoco, Chile
- Position: Defensive midfielder

Youth career
- Tricolor Quinta
- 1990–1995: O'Higgins

Senior career*
Years	Team	Apps	(Gls)
1996	Rengo (city team)	–	(–)
1996–2001	O'Higgins	138	(3)
1996	→ Ñublense (loan)		
2002	Santiago Wanderers	2	(0)
2002	→ Santiago Morning (loan)	11	(0)
2003	O'Higgins		
2004	Deportes Arica		
2004	Deportivo Quevedo		
2007	Rangers	23	(0)
2008	Deportes Copiapó	29	(0)
- * Club domestic league appearances and goals

Darío del Carmen Gálvez Vargas (born 11 July 1975) is a Chilean former footballer who played as a defensive midfielder for clubs in Chile and Ecuador.

== Career ==
Born in Quinta de Tilcoco, Chile, Gálvez represented the Rengo city team and won the 1996 national amateur championship.

At club level, he was with Tricolor Quinta in his hometown before joining the O'Higgins youth system at the age of fifteen. He made his debut in a 1995 Primera División match against Provincial Osorno by replacing Claudio Borghi. The next season, he was loaned out to Ñublense.

Back to O'Higgins, then in the Segunda División, he got promotion to the Primera División after being the runner-up in the 1998 Primera B alongside players such as Mario Núñez, Pedro Rivera, Rolando Azas, among others. It is well remembered a goal that Gálvez scored from the middle of the field in a match against Santiago Morning on 30 October 1998.

After spending three seasons with O'Higgins in the top division (1999–2001), he played for Santiago Wanderers and Santiago Morning.

In 2003, he rejoined to O'Higgins. The next years, he played for Deportes Arica, Rangers and Deportes Copiapó in his homeland.

Abroad, he had a stint with Deportivo Quevedo in the Ecuadorian second level, getting the promotion to the top division in 2004.

== Post-retirement ==
Gálvez graduated as a football manager at INAF (National Football Institute) and has worked as coach for children in his hometown.

== Personal life ==
On his mother side, he is the cousin of former Chile international Alejandro Osorio.
