= Czuwaj Przemyśl =

Polish football club

KS Czuwaj Przemyśl
- Full name: Klub Sportowy Czuwaj Przemyśl
- Nickname: Harcerzyki (The Scouts)
- Founded: 30 March 1918; 107 years ago
- Ground: Major Mieczysław Słaby Stadium
- Capacity: 2,200
- Chairman: Kamil Kowalski
- Manager: Marek Rybkiewicz
- League: Regional league Jarosław
- 2023–24: Regional league Jarosław, 3rd of 16
- Website: http://www.ksczuwaj.pl/
Home colours	Away colours	Third colours

Klub Sportowy Czuwaj is a sports club from the Polish city of Przemyśl, founded by the scouting movement. Originally a multi-sports club with many sections, only the football and handball sections have survived to date.

== History ==
=== Origins ===
The club was founded on 30 March 1918 as a sports club of the scouting movement. The name "Czuwaj" means "Be Vigilant", a scout greeting and motto of the Polish Scouting and Guiding Association. Originally it was a multi-sports club with many sections however few of them have survived very long. In 1922 the club held its first AGM, and the boxing section of the club was founded. In 1931, the handball section was founded, the longest continuously functioning section of the club.

=== Communist era ===
The handball section played 11-a-side handball until 1961, until the teams were re-organised and they switched to 7-a-side. In 1947, with the arrival of communism in Poland, the club was under the patronage of the Polish State Railways. This is when the club enjoyed its golden years, reaching an all-time high of 7th place in 1950 in the second division. In 1957 the boxing club was dissolved.

=== Success and decline ===
By the end of the 1990s, the club ran into serious financial difficulties, despite the handball team reaching their highest ever division, the Ekstraklasa between 1997 and 1999, and the football team reaching the second division for the second time in its history in the 1997–98 season. Both the handball and the football sections were liquidated in 1999 during a general meeting where a vote of 25–21 in favour of liquidating the club was held. A different association reactivated the football team almost immediately under the name "Klub Sportowy Czuwaj". The handball club had to wait until 2007, when it was revived with the help of the city. In 2012, the handball club was given to "A. Fredry Club of the University College of Teachers in Przemysl" ("Klub Uczelnianego Kolegium Nauczycielskiego im. A. Fredry w Przemyślu"), ceasing to be formally part of the club. In 2014, the club formally revived its handball section.

== Naming Timeline ==
- 1918 – Harcerski Klub Sportowy Czuwaj
- 1947 – Kolejowy Klub Sportowy Kolejarz
- 1955 – Kolejowy Klub Sportowy Czuwaj
- 1999 – Klub Sportowy Czuwaj Przemyśl

== Sections of the club ==
- Acrobatics (defunct)
- Archery (defunct)
- Association football (1918–1999, 1999–present)
- Athletics (defunct)
- Basketball (defunct)
- Boxing (1922–1957)
- Canoeing (defunct)
- Chess (defunct)
- Contract bridge (defunct)
- Cycling (defunct)
- Fencing (defunct)
- Field hockey (defunct)
- Gymnastics (defunct)
- Handball
  - Men's (1931–1999, 2007–2012, 2014–)
  - Women's 7-a-side (defunct)
- Ice hockey (defunct)
- Motorcycle club (defunct)
- Sailing (defunct)
- Shooting sports (defunct)
- Skiing (defunct)
- Sports tourism (defunct)
- Swimming (defunct)
- Table Tennis (defunct)
- Tennis (defunct)
- Volleyball
  - Men's (defunct)
  - Women's (defunct)
- Water sports (defunct)

== Honours ==
- Scout Champions – 1924

== Rivalries ==
The club has a fierce rivalry with neighbours Polonia Przemyśl and Zaglebie Sosnowiec.

== Notable players ==
Internationally capped players

- (Latvia) Andrejs Prohorenkovs
