= 1998 Campeonato Nacional Primera B =

Primera B de Chile
- Season: 1998
- Champions: Cobresal
- Promoted: Cobresal; O'Higgins; Santiago Morning
- Relegated: Deportes Colchagua

The 1998 Primera B de Chile was the 48th completed season of the Primera B de Chile.

Cobresal was tournament’s champion and was promoted to 1999 Primera División de Chile alongside O'Higgins and Santiago Morning, which achieved the promotion in the Promotion Playoffs.

== League table ==
Pos	Team	Pld	W	D	L	GF	GA	GD	Pts
1	Cobresal	30	19	8	3	79	22	+57	65
2	O'Higgins	30	19	2	9	61	39	+22	59
3	Santiago Morning	30	17	7	6	40	23	+17	58
4	Unión Española	30	17	5	8	60	44	+16	56
5	Universidad de Concepción	30	16	4	10	59	44	+15	52
6	Everton	30	14	6	10	43	30	+13	48
7	Deportes Linares	30	12	8	10	47	52	−5	44
8	Deportes Melipilla	30	10	13	7	42	35	+7	43
9	Magallanes	30	10	10	10	37	41	−4	40
10	Unión San Felipe	30	11	2	17	40	65	−25	35
11	Deportes Ovalle	30	8	10	12	39	44	−5	34
12	Deportes Antofagasta	30	6	11	13	30	45	−15	29
13	Fernández Vial	30	5	12	13	36	53	−17	27
14	Deportes Arica	30	5	10	15	24	47	−23	25
15	Ñublense	30	5	8	17	28	54	−26	23
16	Regional Atacama	30	3	10	17	23	50	−27	19

== Promotion/relegation play-offs ==
19 December 1998	Santiago Morning	2 – 0	Provincial Osorno	Santa Laura
	Nuñez 29'; Avalos 78' (pen.)			Referee: Eduardo Gamboa

19 December 1998	Unión Española	1 – 6	Coquimbo Unido	Santa Laura
	Ibañez 2'		de Gregorio 23' 32'; Ortega Sánchez 45' 64'; Caro 52'; Cabello 55'	Attendance: 8,978; Referee: Christian Lemus

22 December 1998	Provincial Osorno	1 – 1	Santiago Morning	Parque Schott
	Calabresse		Gullace	Referee: Pablo Pozo

22 December 1998	Coquimbo Unido	1 – 3	Unión Española	Francisco Sánchez Rumoroso
	Ortega Sánchez		Villán; Gutiérrez
