= Alejandro Tobar =

Chilean footballer (born 1976)

Personal information
- Full name: Alejandro Andrés Tobar Vargas
- Date of birth: 4 June 1976 (age 50)
- Place of birth: Rancagua, Chile
- Height: 1.80 m (5 ft 11 in)
- Position: Attacking midfielder

Youth career
- O'Higgins

Senior career*
Years	Team	Apps	(Gls)
1995–2000	O'Higgins	112	(12)
1997	→ Palestino (loan)	4	(0)
2001	Deportes Puerto Montt	11	(0)
2001–2002	Deportes La Serena	30	(4)
2003–2004	Persib Bandung		(14)
2005–2006	PSMS Medan		(12)
2007	DPMM FC		(4)
2008–2010	Persikab Bandung		
2010–2012	Persiku Kudus		
2013	Persikabo Bogor		
- * Club domestic league appearances and goals

Alejandro Andrés Tobar Vargas (Note: In this Spanish name, the first or paternal surname is Tobar and the second or maternal family name is Vargas.) (born 4 June 1976) is a Chilean former professional footballer who played as an attacking midfielder.

== Career ==
A product of O'Higgins youth system in his hometown, Tobar stayed with the club until 2000 and got promotion to the 1999 Primera División, alongside players such as Mauricio Dinamarca, Roberto González, Darío Gálvez, Iván Sepúlveda, Mario Núñez, among others. In the first half 1997, he played on loan at Palestino.

In Chile, he also played for Deportes Puerto Montt (2001) and Deportes La Serena (2001–02).

Then, he moved to Asia and played mainly in Indonesia. In 2004 he joined Persib Bandung, coinciding with his compatriots Claudio Lizama, Julio Lopez, Angelo Espinosa and the coach Juan Páez. He also played for PSMS Medan (2005–06), Persikab Bandung (2008–2010) and Persikabo Bogor (2013), where he coincided with Julio Lopez again. As a member of PSMS Medan, he won the 2005 Piala Emas Bang Yos (Gold Cup Bang Yos), alongside his compatriots Luis Hicks and Mario Quiñones.

In 2007, he had a stint with the Bruneian club DPMM FC in the Malaysia Super League.

== Post-retirement ==
Tobar has continued on playing football at amateur level in clubs such as Kuda Sakti FC in the Rambo Cup 4294-Kuda Sakti FC I 2021. He also has taken part in exhibition games alongside players such as Cristian Carrasco and Claudio Martínez.

== Honours ==
PSMS Medan

- Piala Emas Bang Yos (Gold Cup Bang Yos): 2005
