= 2009 South American Beach Soccer Championship =

2009 FIFA Beach Soccer World Cup CONMEBOL qualifier
2009 South American Beach Soccer Championship

Tournament details
- Host country: Uruguay
- Dates: 11–15 March
- Teams: 8
- Venue: 1 (in 1 host city)

Final positions
- Champions: Brazil (4th title)
- Runners-up: Uruguay
- Third place: Argentina
- Fourth place: Ecuador

Tournament statistics
- Matches played: 16
- Goals scored: 147 (9.19 per match)

The 2009 FIFA Beach Soccer World Cup CONMEBOL qualifier, also later and commonly known as the 2009 South American Beach Soccer Championship, was the third Beach Soccer World Cup qualification championship for South America, held from March 11–15 in Montevideo, Uruguay.

The qualifiers were not coordinated by CONMEBOL at the time. The event was organised by Beach Soccer Worldwide (BSWW), under the FIFA Beach Soccer World Cup Qualifier title. CONMEBOL began recognising the tournaments in 2013, under the title South American Beach Soccer Championship, also acknowledging the 2006–11 events as historic editions of the championship. CONMEBOL eventually began organising the qualifiers in 2017, under a new title.

Brazil won the championship, with the hosts Uruguay taking 2nd place. Third place Argentina scraped through to move on to play in the 2009 FIFA Beach Soccer World Cup in Dubai, United Arab Emirates along with the two finalists.

== Participating nations ==
- Argentina
- Brazil
- Chile
- Ecuador
- Paraguay
- Peru
- Uruguay
- Venezuela

== Group stage ==
=== Group A ===
Team	Pts	Pld	W	W+	L	GF	GA	GD
Uruguay	6	3	2	0	1	11	5	6
Argentina	6	3	2	0	1	15	9	6
Chile	6	3	2	0	1	13	13	0
Peru	0	3	0	0	3	7	19	-12

- Ranking among URU, ARG, CHI by tiebreak

11 March 2009

Argentina	5–6	Chile

Montevideo

11 March 2009

Peru	1–6	Uruguay

Montevideo

12 March 2009

Argentina	9–3	Peru

Montevideo

12 March 2009

Uruguay	5–3	Chile

Montevideo

13 March 2009

Chile	4–3	Peru

Montevideo

13 March 2009

Uruguay	0–1	Argentina

Montevideo

=== Group B ===
Team	Pts	Pld	W	W+	L	GF	GA	GD
Brazil	9	3	3	0	0	26	4	22
Ecuador	6	3	2	0	1	17	15	2
Paraguay	3	3	1	0	2	8	14	-6
Venezuela	0	3	0	0	3	10	28	-18

11 March 2009

Venezuela	4–6	Paraguay

Montevideo

11 March 2009

Ecuador	3–8	Brazil

Montevideo

12 March 2009

Venezuela	6–12	Ecuador

Montevideo

12 March 2009

Brazil	8–1	Paraguay

Montevideo

13 March 2009

Paraguay	1–2	Ecuador

Montevideo

13 March 2009

Brazil	10–0	Venezuela

Montevideo

== Knockout stage ==
Semi-finals
B1	Brazil	3
A2	Argentina	1
A1	Uruguay	6
B2	Ecuador	2

Final
SF1	Brazil	10
SF2	Uruguay	1
3rd/4th-place match
SF1	Argentina	9
SF2	Ecuador	8

=== Semi-finals ===
14 March 2009

Brazil	3–1	Argentina

Montevideo

14 March 2009

Uruguay	6–2	Ecuador

Montevideo

=== Third Place Play Off ===
15 March 2009

Argentina	9–8 (AET)	Ecuador

Montevideo

=== Final ===
15 March 2009

Brazil	10–1	Uruguay

Montevideo

2009 CONMEBOL Beach Soccer Championship winners

Brazil
Fourth title
