= 2026–27 I-League Cup =

Tournament details
- Country: Indonesia
- Dates: 3 November 2026 – 19 May 2027
- Teams: 38

Tournament statistics
- Matches played: 12
- Goals scored: 51 (4.25 per match)
- Attendance: 37,971 (3,164 per match)
- All statistics correct as of 4 November 2026.

The 2026–27 I-League Cup is the inaugural season of the I-League Cup under its current title. The I-League Cup is open to all clubs participating in the Super League and the Championship.

== Teams ==
All 38 clubs in the Super League and Championship entered the season's I-League Cup.

=== Distribution ===
Phase	Clubs entering in this round	Clubs advancing from previous round	Number of games	Date
Group stage (36 clubs)	16 clubs from Super League (not involved in Asian & ASEAN competitions); 20 clubs from Championship	—N/a	36	3–5 November 2026 (Matchday 1); 24–25 November 2026 (Matchday 2); 1–3 December 2026 (Matchday 3)
Round of 12 (12 clubs)	—N/a	12 group winners	6	12–13 January 2027
Quarter-finals (8 clubs)	2 clubs from Super League (involved in Asian & ASEAN competitions)	6 winners	4	26–27 January 2027
Semi-finals (4 clubs)	—N/a	4 winners	2	21 April 2027
Final (2 clubs)	—N/a	2 winners	1	19 May 2027

=== Location ===
Locations of teams in the 2026–27 I-League Cup.
Blue: Western Zone 1; Cyan: Western Zone 2; Red: Eastern Zone 1; Orange: Eastern Zone 2; Gold : Asian & ASEAN competitions participants
Locations of teams in the 2026–27 I-League Cup from Java region.
Blue: Western Zone 1; Cyan: Western Zone 2; Red: Eastern Zone 1; Orange: Eastern Zone 2; Gold : Asian & ASEAN competitions participants

== Foreign players ==
Each I-League Cup participant can only register 3 foreign players.

Team	Player 1	Player 2	Player 3	Former players
Adhyaksa Bekasi	(Brazil) Artur Vieira	(Japan) Tatsuhide Shimizu	(Trinidad and Tobago) Rundell Winchester	
Arema	(Brazil) Gustavo França	(Colombia) Julián Guevara	(Nigeria) Samuel Otusanya	
Bali United	(Japan) Teppei Yachida	(Netherlands) Tim Receveur	(New Zealand) Jay Herdman	
Barito Putera	(Brazil) Murilo	(Brazil) Renan Alves	(Japan) Kodai Nagashima	
Bhayangkara Presisi	(Costa Rica) Jefferson Brenes	(North Macedonia) Milan Ristovski	(North Macedonia) Nehar Sadiki	
Borneo Samarinda				
de Red	(Brazil) Dimitri Lima	(Brazil) Fellipe Veloso	(Brazil) Keven Alleson	
Deltras	(Brazil) Rian Lopes	(Iran) Taher Jahanbakhsh	(Portugal) Mohcine Nader	
Dewa United Banten	(Brazil) Denílson	(Jamaica) Damion Lowe	(Japan) Taisei Marukawa	
Garudayaksa	(Brazil) Carlos Iury	(Brazil) Paulo Ricardo	(Serbia) Aleksandar Busnić	
Isenmulang Kalteng	(Bolivia) Adriel Fernández	(Brazil) Léo Lelis	(Brazil) Sergio Mendonça	
Java United	(Brazil) Ciro Alves	(Brazil) Gustavo França	(Brazil) Lukas Brambilla	
Kendal Tornado	(Brazil) Diego Dall’Oca	(Brazil) Patrick Cruz	(Japan) Yushi Yamaya	
Madura United	(Brazil) Mendonça	(Bulgaria) Dimitar Mitkov	(Paraguay) Danilo Santacruz	
Persebaya	(Mexico) Francisco Rivera	(North Macedonia) Risto Mitrevski	(Portugal) Miguel Pereira	
Persela	(Brazil) Caíque Souza	(Brazil) Daniel Gonçalves	(Brazil) Juninho Cabral	
Persib				
Persiba	(Japan) Ryohei Yoshihama	(Japan) Takumu Nishihara	(Japan) Tomoki Taniguchi	
Persija	(Bosnia and Herzegovina) Kerim Memija	(Japan) Kyohei Yoshino	(South Korea) Kwon Chang-hoon	
Persijap	(Brazil) China	(Costa Rica) Paulo Santamaría	(Ghana) Samuel Ofori	
Persik	(Portugal) Kiko	(Spain) Jon Toral	(Spain) José Enrique	
Persikad	(Brazil) Gustavo França	(Colombia) Jhon Mena	(Ivory Coast) Habib Fofana	
Persiku	(Belarus) Ivan Veras	(Brazil) Willian Correia	(Portugal) Vítor Barata	
Persipura	(Brazil) Alexsandro	(Brazil) Ricardo Lima	(Japan) Takuya Matsunaga	
Persiraja	(Brazil) Daniel Alemão	(Ivory Coast) Djakaridja Traoré	(Uruguay) Martín Cháves	
Persis	(Armenia) Wbeymar Angulo	(Brazil) Vico Duarte	(Ivory Coast) Bernard Doumbia	
Persita	(Brazil) Éber Bessa	(Brazil) Luquinhas	(Kyrgyzstan) Tamirlan Kozubayev	
PSBS				
PSGC	(Chad) Ezechiel N'Douassel	(Costa Rica) Johan Bonilla	(South Korea) Kim Min-hyeok	
PSIM	(Costa Rica) Marvin Loría	(Japan) Yusaku Yamadera	(Paraguay) Mauro Caballero	
PSIS	(Argentina) Felipe Cadenazzi	(Argentina) Jonathan Bustos	(England) Deri Corfe	
PSM	(Brazil) Victor Luiz	(Japan) Kodai Tanaka	(Serbia) Nenad Lalić	
PSMS	(Brazil) Phillerson	(Portugal) Ângelo Meneses	(Spain) Javier Siverio	
PSPS	(Brazil) Antônio Gamaroni	(Brazil) Luiz Henrique Motta	(Brazil) Matheus Machado	
PSS	(Brazil) Gustavo Tocantins	(Brazil) Lucão	(North Macedonia) Stefan Ashkovski	
RANS Nusantara	(Mali) Ladji Mallé	(Norway) Martin Hoel Andersen	(South Sudan) Amanhom Khamis	
Semen Padang	(Brazil) Júnior Batista	(Brazil) Sávio Roberto	(Montenegro) Igor Ćuković	
Sumsel United	(Brazil) Felipe Ryan	(Japan) Hibiki Mochizuki	(Nigeria) Kenneth Ngwoke	

== Group stage ==
A total of 36 teams will compete in the group stage: 16 clubs from the Super League not involved in Asian & ASEAN competitions and 20 clubs from the Championship. The teams were divided into 12 groups of three teams each in a draw held on 7 October 2026. The group stage will be played in a single round-robin format, with each team playing two matches, one at home and one away. The 12 group winners will advance to the round of 12.

Times are WIB as listed by I-League (local times, if different, are in parentheses).

Number of teams per tier still in the competition
Super League (Note: The two Super League teams involved in Asian & ASEAN competitions joined the competition in the quarter-finals.)	Championship	Total
18 / 18	20 / 20	38 / 38

=== Draw ===
The group stage draw was made on 7 October 2026 by Ferry Paulus, Firman Utina and Ponaryo Astaman in Jakarta. The 36 teams were divided into four geographical zones based on their home bases. Within each zone, the teams were allocated to three pots according to their final standings in the previous season's league competition. Each zone consisted of three groups of three teams, with one team from each pot drawn into each group.

	Western Zone 1			Western Zone 2			Eastern Zone 1			Eastern Zone 2		
Pot 1	Persija (1)	Bhayangkara Presisi (1)	Dewa United Banten (1)	Java United (1)	PSIM (1)	Garudayaksa (1)	Persebaya (1)	Persik (1)	Persijap (1)	Bali United (1)	Arema (1)	PSM (1)
Pot 2	Persita (1)	Semen Padang (2)	Sumsel United (2)	PSS (1)	Adhyaksa Bekasi (2)	Persikad (2)	Madura United (1)	Persis (2)	PSBS (2)	Isenmulang Kalteng (1)	Persipura (2)	Barito Putera (2)
Pot 3	Persiraja (2)	PSPS (2)	PSMS (2)	Persiku (2)	PSIS (2)	PSGC (2)	Deltras (2)	Persela (2)	Kendal Tornado (2)	Persiba (2)	RANS Nusantara (2)	de Red (2)

=== Western Zone 1 ===
==== Group A ====
Pos	Team	Pld	W	D	L	GF	GA	GD	Pts	Qualification
1	PSMS (2)	1	0	1	0	1	1	0	1 (Note: Ranked on fair-play points: PSMS –1, Persija –2.)	Advance to round of 12
2	Persija (1)	1	0	1	0	1	1	0	1	
3	Sumsel United (2)	0	0	0	0	0	0	0	0	

Updated to match(es) played on 3 November 2026. Source: 2026–27 I.League Cup
Rules for classification: 1) Points; 2) Head-to-head points; 3) Head-to-head goal difference; 4) Head-to-head goals scored; 5) Goal difference; 6) Goals scored; 7) Fair-play points; 8) Draw.
Notes:

3 November 2026	PSMS (2)	1–1	Persija (1)	Deli Serdang
19:00	Phillerson 80'	Report	Dennis 42'	Stadium: North Sumatra Stadium; Attendance: 22.158; Referee: Yudi Nurcahya

24 November 2026	Persija (1)	v	Sumsel United (2)	Bantul
16:00		Report		Stadium: Sultan Agung Stadium

3 December 2026	Sumsel United (2)	v	PSMS (2)	Palembang
16:00		Report		Stadium: Gelora Sriwijaya Stadium

==== Group B ====
Pos	Team	Pld	W	D	L	GF	GA	GD	Pts	Qualification
1	Bhayangkara Presisi (1)	1	1	0	0	3	1	+2	3	Advance to round of 12
2	Semen Padang (2)	0	0	0	0	0	0	0	0	
3	PSPS (2)	1	0	0	1	1	3	−2	0	

Updated to match(es) played on 4 November 2026. Source: 2026–27 I.League Cup
Rules for classification: 1) Points; 2) Head-to-head points; 3) Head-to-head goal difference; 4) Head-to-head goals scored; 5) Goal difference; 6) Goals scored; 7) Fair-play points; 8) Draw.

4 November 2026	PSPS (2)	1–3	Bhayangkara Presisi (1)	Pekanbaru
19:00		Report		Stadium: Kaharudin Nasution

24 November 2026	Bhayangkara Presisi (1)	v	Semen Padang (2)	Bandar Lampung
19:00		Report		Stadium: Sumpah Pemuda Stadium

3 December 2026	Semen Padang (2)	v	PSPS (2)	Bekasi
19:00		Report		Stadium: Patriot Candrabhaga Stadium

==== Group C ====
Pos	Team	Pld	W	D	L	GF	GA	GD	Pts	Qualification
1	Dewa United Banten (1)	1	1	0	0	3	1	+2	3	Advance to round of 12
2	Persiraja (2)	0	0	0	0	0	0	0	0	
3	Persita (1)	1	0	0	1	1	3	−2	0	

Updated to match(es) played on 3 November 2026. Source: 2026–27 I.League Cup
Rules for classification: 1) Points; 2) Head-to-head points; 3) Head-to-head goal difference; 4) Head-to-head goals scored; 5) Goal difference; 6) Goals scored; 7) Fair-play points; 8) Draw.

3 November 2026	Dewa United Banten (1)	3–1	Persita (1)	Serang
19:00	Denílson 7' 85'; Struick 43'	Report	Bessa 56'	Stadium: Banten International Stadium; Attendance: 510; Referee: Axel Febrian Sinaga

24 November 2026	Persiraja (2)	v	Dewa United Banten (1)	Banda Aceh
20:30		Report		Stadium: Harapan Bangsa Stadium

2 December 2026	Persita (1)	v	Persiraja (2)	Tangerang
19:00		Report		Stadium: Indomilk Arena

=== Western Zone 2 ===
==== Group D ====
Pos	Team	Pld	W	D	L	GF	GA	GD	Pts	Qualification
1	Java United (1)	1	1	0	0	5	0	+5	3	Advance to round of 12
2	PSIS (2)	0	0	0	0	0	0	0	0	
3	Adhyaksa Bekasi (2)	1	0	0	1	0	5	−5	0	

Updated to match(es) played on 4 November 2026. Source: 2026–27 I.League Cup
Rules for classification: 1) Points; 2) Head-to-head points; 3) Head-to-head goal difference; 4) Head-to-head goals scored; 5) Goal difference; 6) Goals scored; 7) Fair-play points; 8) Draw.

4 November 2026	Java United (1)	5–0	Adhyaksa Bekasi (2)	Semarang
16:00		Report		Stadium: Jatidiri Stadium

25 November 2026	Adhyaksa Bekasi (2)	v	PSIS (2)	Bekasi
19:00		Report		Stadium: Patriot Candrabhaga Stadium

2 December 2026	PSIS (2)	v	Java United (1)	Semarang
19:00		Report		Stadium: Jatidiri Stadium

==== Group E ====
Pos	Team	Pld	W	D	L	GF	GA	GD	Pts	Qualification
1	Persikad (2)	1	1	0	0	6	2	+4	3	Advance to round of 12
2	PSIM (1)	0	0	0	0	0	0	0	0	
3	Persiku (2)	1	0	0	1	2	6	−4	0	

Updated to match(es) played on 4 November 2026. Source: 2026–27 I.League Cup
Rules for classification: 1) Points; 2) Head-to-head points; 3) Head-to-head goal difference; 4) Head-to-head goals scored; 5) Goal difference; 6) Goals scored; 7) Fair-play points; 8) Draw.

4 November 2026	Persikad (2)	6–2	Persiku (2)	Bogor
16:00		Report		Stadium: Pakansari Stadium

25 November 2026	Persiku (2)	v	PSIM (1)	Lamongan
15:30		Report		Stadium: Surajaya Stadium

2 December 2026	PSIM (1)	v	Persikad (2)	Bantul
19:00		Report		Stadium: Sultan Agung Stadium

==== Group F ====
Pos	Team	Pld	W	D	L	GF	GA	GD	Pts	Qualification
1	PSS (1)	1	1	0	0	6	0	+6	3	Advance to round of 12
2	Garudayaksa (1)	0	0	0	0	0	0	0	0	
3	PSGC (2)	1	0	0	1	0	6	−6	0	

Updated to match(es) played on 4 November 2026. Source: 2026–27 I.League Cup
Rules for classification: 1) Points; 2) Head-to-head points; 3) Head-to-head goal difference; 4) Head-to-head goals scored; 5) Goal difference; 6) Goals scored; 7) Fair-play points; 8) Draw.

4 November 2026	PSS (1)	6–0	PSGC (2)	Sleman
15:30		Report		Stadium: Maguwoharjo Stadium

24 November 2026	Garudayaksa (1)	v	PSS (1)	Bogor
16:00		Report		Stadium: Pakansari Stadium

3 December 2026	PSGC (2)	v	Garudayaksa (1)	Ciamis
16:00		Report		Stadium: Galuh Stadium

=== Eastern Zone 1 ===
==== Group G ====
Pos	Team	Pld	W	D	L	GF	GA	GD	Pts	Qualification
1	Kendal Tornado (2)	1	1	0	0	3	2	+1	3	Advance to round of 12
2	PSBS (2)	0	0	0	0	0	0	0	0	
3	Persebaya (1)	1	0	0	1	2	3	−1	0	

Updated to match(es) played on 3 November 2026. Source: 2026–27 I.League Cup
Rules for classification: 1) Points; 2) Head-to-head points; 3) Head-to-head goal difference; 4) Head-to-head goals scored; 5) Goal difference; 6) Goals scored; 7) Fair-play points; 8) Draw.

3 November 2026	Kendal Tornado (2)	3–2	Persebaya (1)	Surakarta
19:00	Akbar 59'; Dimas 86'; Cruz 90'	Report	Sananta 71'; Toni 78'	Stadium: Sriwedari; Attendance: 232; Referee: Candra

24 November 2026	Persebaya (1)	v	PSBS (2)	Surabaya
16:00		Report		Stadium: Gelora Bung Tomo Stadium

3 December 2026	PSBS (2)	v	Kendal Tornado (2)	Surakarta
16:00		Report		Stadium: Sriwedari

==== Group H ====
Pos	Team	Pld	W	D	L	GF	GA	GD	Pts	Qualification
1	Persik (1)	1	1	0	0	2	0	+2	3	Advance to round of 12
2	Deltras (2)	0	0	0	0	0	0	0	0	
3	Persis (2)	1	0	0	1	0	2	−2	0	

Updated to match(es) played on 4 November 2026. Source: 2026–27 I.League Cup
Rules for classification: 1) Points; 2) Head-to-head points; 3) Head-to-head goal difference; 4) Head-to-head goals scored; 5) Goal difference; 6) Goals scored; 7) Fair-play points; 8) Draw.

4 November 2026	Persik (1)	2–0	Persis (2)	Kediri
19:00		Report		Stadium: Brawijaya Stadium

25 November 2026	Deltras (2)	v	Persik (1)	Sidoarjo
19:00		Report		Stadium: Gelora Delta Stadium

2 December 2026	Persis (2)	v	Deltras (2)	Surakarta
19:00		Report		Stadium: Manahan Stadium

==== Group I ====
Pos	Team	Pld	W	D	L	GF	GA	GD	Pts	Qualification
1	Persela (2)	1	1	0	0	2	0	+2	3	Advance to round of 12
2	Madura United (1)	0	0	0	0	0	0	0	0	
3	Persijap (1)	1	0	0	1	0	2	−2	0	

Updated to match(es) played on 3 November 2026. Source: 2026–27 I.League Cup
Rules for classification: 1) Points; 2) Head-to-head points; 3) Head-to-head goal difference; 4) Head-to-head goals scored; 5) Goal difference; 6) Goals scored; 7) Fair-play points; 8) Draw.

3 November 2026	Persela (2)	2–0	Persijap (1)	Lamongan
19:00	Kushedya 67', 70'	Report		Stadium: Surajaya Stadium; Attendance: 2,014; Referee: Muhammad Tri Santoso

24 November 2026	Madura United (1)	v	Persela (2)	Pamekasan
19:00		Report		Stadium: Gelora Ratu Pamelingan Stadium

1 December 2026	Persijap (1)	v	Madura United (1)	Jepara
19:00		Report		Stadium: Gelora Bumi Kartini Stadium

=== Eastern Zone 2 ===
==== Group J ====
Pos	Team	Pld	W	D	L	GF	GA	GD	Pts	Qualification
1	Bali United (1)	1	1	0	0	6	1	+5	3	Advance to round of 12
2	Barito Putera (2)	0	0	0	0	0	0	0	0	
3	Persiba (2)	1	0	0	1	1	6	−5	0	

Updated to match(es) played on 4 November 2026. Source: 2026–27 I.League Cup
Rules for classification: 1) Points; 2) Head-to-head points; 3) Head-to-head goal difference; 4) Head-to-head goals scored; 5) Goal difference; 6) Goals scored; 7) Fair-play points; 8) Draw.

4 November 2026	Persiba (2)	1–6	Bali United (1)	Surakarta
19:00		Report		Stadium: Manahan Stadium

25 November 2026	Bali United (1)	v	Barito Putera (2)	Gianyar
19:00 (20:00 UTC+8)		Report		Stadium: Kapten I Wayan Dipta Stadium

2 December 2026	Barito Putera (2)	v	Persiba (2)	Banjarmasin
19:00 (20:00 UTC+8)		Report		Stadium: 17th May Stadium

==== Group K ====
Pos	Team	Pld	W	D	L	GF	GA	GD	Pts	Qualification
1	PSM (1)	1	1	0	0	2	0	+2	3	Advance to round of 12
2	Persipura (2)	0	0	0	0	0	0	0	0	
3	de Red (2)	1	0	0	1	0	2	−2	0	

Updated to match(es) played on 3 November 2026. Source: 2026–27 I.League Cup
Rules for classification: 1) Points; 2) Head-to-head points; 3) Head-to-head goal difference; 4) Head-to-head goals scored; 5) Goal difference; 6) Goals scored; 7) Fair-play points; 8) Draw.

3 November 2026	de Red (2)	0–2	PSM (1)	Surabaya
16:00		Report	Abdul 25'; Tanaka 48'	Stadium: Gelora 10 November Stadium; Attendance: 302; Referee: Eristo Rinenggo

25 November 2026	PSM (1)	v	Persipura (2)	Parepare
19:00 (20:00 UTC+8)		Report		Stadium: Gelora B.J. Habibie Stadium

2 December 2026	Persipura (2)	v	de Red (2)	Jayapura
16:00 (18:00 UTC+9)		Report		Stadium: Lukas Enembe Stadium

==== Group L ====
Pos	Team	Pld	W	D	L	GF	GA	GD	Pts	Qualification
1	Arema (1)	1	1	0	0	4	0	+4	3	Advance to round of 12
2	Isenmulang Kalteng (1)	0	0	0	0	0	0	0	0	
3	RANS Nusantara (2)	1	0	0	1	0	4	−4	0	

Updated to match(es) played on 3 November 2026. Source: 2026–27 I.League Cup
Rules for classification: 1) Points; 2) Head-to-head points; 3) Head-to-head goal difference; 4) Head-to-head goals scored; 5) Goal difference; 6) Goals scored; 7) Fair-play points; 8) Draw.

3 November 2026	RANS Nusantara (2)	0–4	Arema (1)	Malang
16:00		Report	Otusanya 26', 35', 53'; Sjahbandi 68'	Stadium: Kanjuruhan; Attendance: 886; Referee: Roberto Putra

25 November 2026	Arema (1)	v	Isenmulang Kalteng (1)	Malang
19:00		Report		Stadium: Kanjuruhan

1 December 2026	Isenmulang Kalteng (1)	v	RANS Nusantara (2)	Palangka Raya
19:00		Report		Stadium: Tuah Pahoe Stadium

== Round of 12 ==
The 12 group winners from the group stage will compete in the round of 12. The home team for each match will be determined by the teams' final group-stage standings, based on points, goal difference, goals scored, and fair-play records. If all criteria are equal, the home team will be determined by a draw.

Times are WIB as listed by I-League (local times, if different, are in parentheses).

12–13 January 2027	Winner Group A/J	v	Winner Group A/J

12–13 January 2027	Winner Group B/K	v	Winner Group B/K

12–13 January 2027	Winner Group C/L	v	Winner Group C/L

12–13 January 2027	Winner Group D/G	v	Winner Group D/G

12–13 January 2027	Winner Group E/H	v	Winner Group E/H

12–13 January 2027	Winner Group F/I	v	Winner Group F/I

== Quarter-finals ==
A total of eight teams will compete in the quarter-finals: the two Super League clubs involved in Asian & ASEAN competitions (Persib and Borneo Samarinda) will enter at this stage, along with the six winners from the round of 12. The match pairings and the home team for each fixture will be determined by a draw.

Times are WIB as listed by I-League (local times, if different, are in parentheses).

26–27 January 2027	Borneo Samarinda (1)	v	Knockout Winner 1/2/3	Samarinda
				Stadium: Segiri Stadium

26–27 January 2027	Knockout Winner 1/2/3	v	Knockout Winner 1/2/3

26–27 January 2027	Persib (1)	v	Knockout Winner 4/5/6	Bandung
				Stadium: Gelora Bandung Lautan Api Stadium

26–27 January 2027	Knockout Winner 4/5/6	v	Knockout Winner 4/5/6

== Semi-finals ==
The four winners of the quarter-finals will advance to the semi-finals. The match pairings and the home team for each fixture will be determined by a draw.

Times are WIB as listed by I-League (local times, if different, are in parentheses).

21 April 2027	Quarter-final 1 Winner	v	Quarter-final 2 Winner

21 April 2027	Quarter-final 3 Winner	v	Quarter-final 4 Winner

== Final ==
The two winners of the semi-finals will advance to the final, which will be played at a neutral venue that will be determined by I-League.

Times are WIB as listed by I-League (local times, if different, are in parentheses).

19 May 2027

Semi-final 1 Winner	v	Semi-final 2 Winner

== Statistics ==
=== Top goalscorers ===
Table correct as of 4 November 2026.

Rank	Player	Club	Goals
1	(Brazil) Gustavo Tocantins	PSS	4
2	(Brazil) Gustavo França	Java United	3
2	(Nigeria) Samuel Otusanya	Arema	3
2	(Brazil) Gustavo França	Persikad	3

== See also ==
- 2026–27 Super League
- 2026–27 Championship
