= 2026–27 Championship (Indonesia) =

17th Season of 2nd tier of football in Indonesia

Championship
- Season: 2026–27
- Dates: 11 September 2026 – 9 May 2027
- Matches: 99
- Goals: 293 (2.96 per match)
- Top goalscorer: Javier Siverio (15 goals)
- Biggest home win: Persis 7–0 PSBS (20 September 2026)
- Biggest away win: PSBS 0–6 Kendal Tornado (20 November 2026)
- Highest scoring: Persis 7–0 PSBS (20 September 2026); PSBS 1–6 Persipura (17 October 2026)
- Longest winning run: PSPS (6 games)
- Longest unbeaten run: Kendal Tornado (10 games)
- Longest winless run: PSBS (10 games)
- Longest losing run: PSBS (10 games)
- Highest attendance: 15,123; Semen Padang 0–1 PSPS (4 October 2026)
- Lowest attendance: 43; Persiku 1–2 PSGC (3 October 2026)
- Total attendance: 87,521
- Average attendance: 4,376
- All statistics correct as of 22 November 2026.

The 2026–27 Championship (also known as the 2026–27 Pegadaian Championship for sponsorship reasons) is the second season of the Championship for men's football, under its current name, and the 17th season under its current league structure. The season began on 11 September 2026 and will conclude in 9 May 2027.

== Overview ==
=== General ===
20 teams will compete in the league – the fourteen teams from the previous season, three teams relegated from the Super League and three teams promoted from Liga Nusantara.

==== Teams promoted to Super League ====
Garudayaksa and PSS became the first two teams to be promoted in the final matchweek. Garudayaksa defeated Persikad on 2 May 2026, while PSS defeated PSIS on 3 May 2026 requiring both to stay in the second division for just one season. For Garudayaksa, this marked their first season as their current entity after acquiring PSKC in the previous season.

Adhyaksa Banten became the last team to be promoted after winning over Persipura in the promotion playoff on 8 May 2026, which ended their two-season stay in the second division.

==== Teams relegated from Super League ====
PSBS and Semen Padang return to second division after both spent two seasons in the top division. In the matchweek 31, PSBS suffered a defeat to Persebaya on 2 May 2026 while Semen Padang lost to Dewa United Banten on 3 May 2026.

Madura United's victory over PSM in the final matchweek on 23 May 2026 saw Persis return to the second division after spending four seasons in the top division despite their victory over Persita.

==== Teams promoted from Liga Nusantara ====
Dejan and RANS Nusantara became the first two teams to be promoted after reaching the final on 3 February 2026 and both teams returned after one season absence. In the semifinals, Dejan defeated PSGC while RANS Nusantara defeated Persiba Bantul.

The victory over Persiba Bantul on penalties in the promotion playoff on 7 February 2026 made PSGC the last team to be promoted and return to the second division after six seasons absence.

==== Teams relegated to Liga Nusantara ====
The defeat against Sumsel United in matchweek 21 held on 28 February 2026 resulted in Sriwijaya being the first team to be relegated after spending seven seasons in the second division and recording the lowest points record since the Championship was formed as the second division in the current Indonesian football league pyramid.

Persipal became the second team to be relegated after losing to Deltras in the matchweek 24 on 12 April 2026. Persipal was relegated after spending four seasons in the second division as their current entity after acquiring Muba Babel United in 2022–23 season.

Persekat became the last team to be relegated after losing to Persiba Balikpapan in the relegation playoff on 8 May 2026, ending their six-season stay in the second division.

=== Grouping ===
This is the second season of the two-region system since its reintroduction in previous season. West Group consists of 10 teams based in Sumatra and the western part of Java, while East Group consists of 10 teams based in the eastern part of Java, Kalimantan, and Papua region. Teams that hold a Super League level license are written in bold.

However, de Red, Persiku and PSIS moved their regions when the draw was announced.

West Group	East Group
Adhyaksa Bekasi; Persikad; Persiku; Persiraja; PSGC; PSIS; **PSMS**; **PSPS**; **Semen Padang**; Sumsel United	**Barito Putera** de Red; **Deltras**; Kendal Tornado; Persela; Persiba; **Persipura**; **Persis**; PSBS; RANS Nusantara

== Teams ==
=== Changes ===
The following teams changed division since the 2025–26 season.

To Championship
▼ Relegated from Super League
- PSBS
- Semen Padang
- Persis
▲ Promoted from Liga Nusantara
- RANS Nusantara
- de Red (Note: formerly Dejan)
- PSGC

From Championship
▲ Promoted to Super League
- Garudayaksa
- PSS
- Adhyaksa Banten
▼ Relegated to Liga Nusantara
- Sriwijaya
- Persipal
- Persekat

=== Name changes and relocated teams ===
Clubs can no longer relocate their home base once they have obtained an I-League license. Any club that violates this rule will be deducted one point.

- FC Bekasi City changed its official name to Adhyaksa Football Club Bekasi as of this season, following a takeover by the Public Prosecution Service of Indonesia.
- Dejan has relocated to East Java and will be using the Gelora 10 November Stadium in Surabaya as its home base starting this season, after the club's ownership was handed over to the East Java Regional Leadership of the Indonesian Democratic Party of Struggle. As part of the acquisition, the club has been renamed de Red Football Club, with the new identity being ratified at the 2026 PSSI General Congress.

=== Teams by province ===
Number	Province	Team(s)
4	Central Java	Kendal Tornado, Persiku, Persis, and PSIS
4	East Java	de Red, Deltras, Persela, and RANS Nusantara
3	West Java	Adhyaksa Bekasi, Persikad, and PSGC
2	Papua	Persipura and PSBS
1	Aceh	Persiraja
1	East Kalimantan	Persiba
1	North Sumatra	PSMS
1	Riau	PSPS
1	South Kalimantan	Barito Putera
1	South Sumatra	Sumsel United
1	West Sumatra	Semen Padang

=== Location and stadiums ===
Locations of teams in the 2026–27 Championship.
Red: West Group; Blue: East Group
Locations of teams in the 2026–27 Championship from Java region.
Red: West Group; Blue: East Group

Team	Location	Stadium	Capacity	2025–26 season
Adhyaksa Bekasi	Bekasi	Patriot Candrabhaga	30,000	3rd in Group 1
Barito Putera	Banjarmasin	17th May (Note: Barito Putera have also registered the Demang Lehman Stadium at Banjarbaru as an alternate venue.)	30,000	3rd in Group 2
de Red^{↑}	Surabaya	Gelora 10 November	20,000	Liga Nusantara runner-up
Deltras	Sidoarjo	Gelora Delta	19,400	5th in Group 2
Kendal Tornado	Kendal	Sriwedari, at Surakarta (Note: Due to the ongoing renovation of Kebondalem Stadium, Kendal Tornado will play their home matches at Sriwedari Stadium in Surakarta.)	23,000	4th in Group 2
Persela	Lamongan	Surajaya	12,097	6th in Group 2
Persiba	Balikpapan (Note: Due to pitch works at Batakan Stadium, Persiba will hold their home matches at Surajaya Stadium in Lamongan and Manahan Stadium in Surakarta for this season.)	Surajaya, at Lamongan	12,097	Relegation playoff winner
Persiba	Balikpapan	Manahan, at Surakarta	20,000	Relegation playoff winner
Persikad	Depok	Pakansari, at Bogor (Note: Due to Merpati Stadium not meeting the league requirements, Persikad will play their home matches at Pakansari Stadium in Bogor.)	30,000	8th in Group 1
Persiku	Kudus	Sultan Agung, at Bantul (Note: Due to the Wergu Wetan Stadium being rebuilt, Persiku will hold their home matches at Sultan Agung Stadium in Bantul for this season.)	25,000	7th in Group 2
Persipura	Jayapura	Lukas Enembe (Note: Persipura will play their home games for the first half of the season at Gelora Delta Stadium in Sidoarjo due to PSSI sanctions over riots that occurred after last season's promotion play-off match.)	40,263	4th in Championship
Persiraja	Banda Aceh	H. Dimurthala	7,000	5th in Group 1
Persis^{↓}	Surakarta	Manahan	20,000	16th in Super League
PSBS^{↓}	Biak Numfor	Sriwedari, at Surakarta (Note: Due to Cendrawasih Stadium not meeting the league requirements, PSBS will play their home matches at Sriwedari Stadium in Surakarta.)	23,000	18th in Super League
PSGC^{↑}	Ciamis	Galuh	20,000	Promotion playoff winner
PSIS	Semarang	Jatidiri	18,000	8th in Group 2
PSMS	Medan	North Sumatra Main, at Deli Serdang (Note: Due to the ongoing renovation of Teladan Stadium, PSMS will play their home matches at North Sumatra Main Stadium in Deli Serdang.)	26,000	7th in Group 1
PSPS	Pekanbaru	Kaharudin Nasution	25,000	6th in Group 1
RANS Nusantara^{↑}	Batu	Kanjuruhan, at Malang (Note: Due to Brantas Stadium not meeting the league requirements, RANS Nusantara will play their home matches at Kanjuruhan Stadium in Malang.)	21,603	Liga Nusantara champion
Semen Padang^{↓}	Padang	Patriot Candrabhaga, at Bekasi (Note: Due to the renovation of Gelora Haji Agus Salim Stadium, Semen Padang will hold their home matches at Patriot Candrabhaga Stadium for this season. Semen Padang have also registered the Gelora Bandung Lautan Api Stadium at Bandung as an alternate venue.) (Note: Semen Padang played their home game against Adhyaksa Bekasi on November 8 at Gelora Bung Karno Madya Stadium in Jakarta due to Patriot Candrabhaga Stadium being unavailable at that time as it was hosting the 2026 West Java Provincial Sports Week.)	30,000	17th in Super League
Sumsel United	Palembang	Gelora Sriwijaya (Note: Sumsel United have also registered the Bumi Sriwijaya Stadium as an alternate venue.)	23,000	4th in Group 1

^{↓}	Relegated from the Super League
^{↑}	Promoted from the Liga Nusantara

Location notes:

=== Personnel and kits ===
Note: Flags indicate national team as has been defined under FIFA eligibility rules. Players may hold more than one non-FIFA nationality. No foreign coaches are allowed.

Team	Manager	Captain	Kit manufacturer	Kit sponsors	
Team	Manager	Captain	Kit manufacturer	Main	Other(s)
Adhyaksa Bekasi	(Indonesia national football team) Amirul Mukminin (caretaker)	(Indonesia national football team) Delvin Rumbino	(Indonesia) Calma	balé by BTN	List: Front: Siloam Hospitals, Bank Mandiri; Back: PStore, RS EMC Pekayon; Sleeves: Air Alam; Shorts: None
Barito Putera	(Indonesia national football team) Djadjang Nurdjaman	(Indonesia national football team) Bayu Pradana	(Indonesia) Eazywear	Hasnur Group	List: Front: TCT, AKSEL by Bank Kalsel, Jhonlin Group; Back: PLN; Sleeves: None; Shorts: None
de Red	(Indonesia national football team) Aji Santoso	(Indonesia national football team) Wisal El Burji	(Indonesia) RMB Apparel	Myze Hotel	List: Front: None; Back: None; Sleeves: None; Shorts: None
Deltras	(Indonesia national football team) Leonard Tupamahu	(Indonesia national football team) Muhammad Idris	(Indonesia) Made by club	Kopi Ya!	List: Front: Sumber Urip Sejati; Back: Mitra Orphys; Sleeves: Sungai Indah Group; Shorts: None
Kendal Tornado	(Indonesia national football team) Stefan Keltjes	(Indonesia national football team) Dimas Sukarno	(Indonesia) Calma	Bank BRI	List: Front: DigiNIX, Agung Prakarsa Metalindo, Baja Indoraya, Charlie Hospital; Back: Charlie Sport Center; Sleeves: None; Shorts: None
Persela	(Indonesia national football team) Bima Sakti	(Indonesia national football team) Dendy Sulistyawan	(Indonesia) Octagon^{1}	Duta Merpati	List: Front: Altop Group, DR.SHIELD, M-Truss, Toserba Pesantren Sunan Drajat; Back: DOWA Ecosystem, Greda; Sleeves: None; Shorts: None
Persiba	(Indonesia national football team) Yus Arfandy (caretaker)	(Indonesia national football team) Meru Kimura	(Indonesia) Arche	MBSS	List: Front: None; Back: None; Sleeves: BT Pacific; Shorts: None
Persikad	(Indonesia national football team) Achmad Zulkifli	(Indonesia national football team) Herwin Tri Saputra	(Indonesia) XTen	Bank Syariah Nasional	List: Front: None; Back: Mitra Orphys; Sleeves: Bank Syariah Nasional; Shorts: None
Persiku	(Indonesia national football team) Agus Yuwono	(Indonesia national football team) Nurhidayat	(Indonesia) Total Sportswear	None	List: Front: None; Back: None; Sleeves: None; Shorts: None
Persipura	(Indonesia national football team) Regi Aditya	(Indonesia national football team) Ruben Sanadi	(Indonesia) Cendrawasih Karsa^{1}	Kapal Api	List: Front: Bank Papua; Back: Ulam Laut; Sleeves: SAGA Supermarket; Shorts: None
Persiraja	(Indonesia national football team) Muhammad Ridwan	(Indonesia national football team) Jayus Hariono	(Indonesia) Trops	Bank Syariah Nasional	List: Front: The Kaluna Resort, Dek Gam Foundation, Mifa Bersaudara, ARI 98; Back: Moya, PDAM Tirta Daroy; Sleeves: Muraya Hotel Aceh; Shorts: None
Persis	(Indonesia national football team) Nurcholis (caretaker)	(Indonesia national football team) Asep Berlian	(Indonesia) Made by club	Aladin Bank	List: Front: Call of Duty: Mobile; Back: None; Sleeves: None; Shorts: None
PSBS	(Indonesia national football team) Miskardi	(Indonesia national football team) Patrias Rumere	(Indonesia) ADSport	None	List: Front: None; Back: None; Sleeves: None; Shorts: None
PSGC	(Indonesia national football team) Herry Kiswanto	(Chad national football team) Ezechiel N'Douassel	(Indonesia) Zestien	RSOP Ciamis^{2}	List: Front: Bank BJB, Indofood; Back: None; Sleeves: None; Shorts: None
PSIS	(Indonesia national football team) Widodo C. Putro	(Indonesia national football team) Komang Tri	(Indonesia) RIORS	Belikopi	List: Front: Lyly Bakery, Immoderma, PStore, Indomie, Cordova Edupartment; Back: Yamaha Mataram Sakti, Titan Home; Sleeves: SanQua Water; Shorts: None
PSMS	(Indonesia national football team) Eko Purdjianto	(Portugal national football team) Ângelo Meneses	(Indonesia) DRX	Bank Sumut	List: Front: None; Back: Inalum, Cap Angsa Terbang; Sleeves: PDAM Tirtanadi; Shorts: None
PSPS	(Indonesia national football team) Akhyar Ilyas	(Indonesia national football team) Alfin Tuasalamony	(Indonesia) Curva Sport	PSF Group	List: Front: RS Awal Bros, Riau Petroleum; Back: None; Sleeves: None; Shorts: None
RANS Nusantara	(Indonesia national football team) Kas Hartadi	(Indonesia national football team) Dias Angga Putra	(Indonesia) Reds!	Cipung Land	List: Front: Sigma Auto, FFAR; Back: None; Sleeves: None; Shorts: None
Semen Padang	(Indonesia national football team) Stefano Cugurra	(Indonesia national football team) Safrudin Tahar	(Indonesia) Calma	Semen Padang	List: Front: Ces Tailor, Do Rent, UPI YPTK, ENG Group, Indibiz, UHA Group, Bank Nagari, CTV Trans Utama, Taspen, Mandiri Taspen; Back: Indofood, RS Premier Bintaro, Elif Air Mineral, Oxygen Denim; Sleeves: Semen Padang; Shorts: None
Sumsel United	(Indonesia national football team) Mohammad Nasuha	(Indonesia national football team) Arif Satria	(Indonesia) XTen	Bank Sumsel Babel	List: Front: Adaro, Serasan Coffee Community, Pupuk Sriwidjaja, MedcoEnergi, PT Ayik Batu Gung; Back: PT Budi Gema Gempita, RMK Energy; Sleeves: None; Shorts: None

1. Apparel made by club.
2. PSGC lacked a main sponsor in Matchweek 1 before being sponsored by Bank BJB from Matchweek 2 to 4 and then RSOP Ciamis from Matchweek 5 onwards.

=== Coaching changes ===
==== Pre-season ====
Team	Outgoing head coach	Manner	Date of vacancy	Replaced by	Date of arrival
Deltras	(Indonesia) Nurul Huda	End of caretaker role	9 May 2026	(Indonesia) Leonard Tupamahu	12 July 2026
PSIS	(Indonesia) Kas Hartadi	End of contract	18 May 2026	(Indonesia) Widodo C. Putro	18 May 2026
Persipura	(Indonesia) Rahmad Darmawan	End of contract	19 May 2026	(Indonesia) Andri Ramawi	15 July 2026
Persis	(Bosnia and Herzegovina) Milomir Šešlija	End of contract	23 May 2026	(Indonesia) Ricky Nelson	15 June 2026
PSBS	(Romania) Marian Mihail	End of contract	23 May 2026	(Indonesia) Miskardi	2 September 2026
Semen Padang	(Indonesia) Imran Nahumarury	End of contract	23 May 2026	(Indonesia) Nil Maizar	3 June 2026
Sumsel United	(Indonesia) Nil Maizar	Signed by Semen Padang	3 June 2026	(Indonesia) Mohammad Nasuha	9 July 2026
PSPS	(Indonesia) Aji Santoso	Resigned	6 June 2026	(Indonesia) Akhyar Ilyas	22 June 2026
de Red	(Indonesia) Nurcholis	Signed by Persis	7 July 2026	(Indonesia) Aji Santoso	3 August 2026
Persiba	(Indonesia) Leonard Tupamahu	Signed by Deltras	12 July 2026	(Indonesia) Sudirman	24 July 2026
Barito Putera	(Indonesia) Stefano Cugurra	End of contract	25 July 2026	(Indonesia national football team) Hendri Susilo	8 August 2026
Persiku	(Indonesia) Bambang Pujo Sumantri	End of contract	7 September 2026	(Indonesia national football team) Kahudi Wahyu	7 September 2026

==== During the season ====
Team	Outgoing head coach	Manner	Date of vacancy	Week	Position in table		Replaced by	Date of appointment
Team	Outgoing head coach	Manner	Date of vacancy	Week	Group	Position	Replaced by	Date of appointment
Persipura	(Indonesia) Andri Ramawi	Sacked	23 September 2026	2	East	8th	(Indonesia) Regi Aditya	23 September 2026
Persiraja	(Indonesia) Jaya Hartono	Sacked	27 September 2026	3	West	9th	(Indonesia) Muhammad Ridwan	28 September 2026
Semen Padang	(Indonesia) Nil Maizar	Sacked	5 October 2026	4	West	5th	(Indonesia) Stefano Cugurra	5 October 2026
Barito Putera	(Indonesia national football team) Hendri Susilo	Sacked	6 October 2026	4	East	7th	(Indonesia) Frans Sinatra (caretaker)	6 October 2026
Persiku	(Indonesia national football team) Kahudi Wahyu	Became technical director	9 October 2026	4	West	10th	(Indonesia) Bambang Pujo (caretaker)	9 October 2026
Persiba	(Indonesia national football team) Sudirman	Sacked	10 October 2026	5	East	9th	(Indonesia) Yus Arfandy (caretaker)	10 October 2026
Persis	(Indonesia national football team) Ricky Nelson	Sacked	16 October 2026	5	East	6th	(Indonesia) Nurcholis (caretaker)	16 October 2026
Barito Putera	(Indonesia national football team) Frans Sinatra (caretaker)	End of caretaker role	20 October 2026	6	East	5th	(Indonesia) Djadjang Nurdjaman	20 October 2026
Persiku	(Indonesia national football team) Bambang Pujo (caretaker)	End of caretaker role	22 October 2026	6	West	10th	(Indonesia) Agus Yuwono	22 October 2026
Adhyaksa Bekasi	(Indonesia national football team) Widyantoro	Sacked	6 November 2026	8	West	8th	(Indonesia national football team) Amirul Mukminin (caretaker)	6 November 2026

== Foreign players ==
Starting from two seasons prior, I-League announced an increase in the foreign player quota to three foreign players. All of them are allowed to be registered in the matchday squad and placed in the starting eleven at the same time.

Team	Player 1	Player 2	Player 3	Unregistered players^{1}	Former players
Adhyaksa Bekasi	(Brazil) Artur Vieira	(Japan) Tatsuhide Shimizu	(Trinidad and Tobago) Rundell Winchester		
Barito Putera	(Brazil) Murilo	(Brazil) Renan Alves	(Japan) Kodai Nagashima		
de Red	(Brazil) Dimitri Lima	(Brazil) Fellipe Veloso	(Brazil) Keven Alleson		
Deltras	(Brazil) Rian Lopes	(Iran) Taher Jahanbakhsh	(Portugal) Mohcine Nader		(Japan) Takuya Matsunaga (Republic of Ireland) Abdeen Abdul
Kendal Tornado	(Brazil) Diego Dall’Oca	(Brazil) Patrick Cruz	(Japan) Yushi Yamaya		
Persela	(Brazil) Caíque Souza	(Brazil) Daniel Gonçalves	(Brazil) Juninho Cabral		
Persiba	(Japan) Ryohei Yoshihama	(Japan) Takumu Nishihara	(Japan) Tomoki Taniguchi		
Persikad	(Brazil) Gustavo França	(Colombia) Jhon Mena	(Ivory Coast) Habib Fofana		
Persiku	(Belarus) Ivan Veras	(Brazil) Willian Correia	(Portugal) Vítor Barata		
Persipura	(Brazil) Alexsandro	(Brazil) Ricardo Lima	(Japan) Takuya Matsunaga	(Argentina) David Müller	
Persiraja	(Brazil) Daniel Alemão	(Ivory Coast) Djakaridja Traoré	(Uruguay) Martín Cháves		
Persis	(Armenia) Wbeymar Angulo	(Brazil) Vico Duarte	(Ivory Coast) Bernard Doumbia	(Montenegro) Slavko Damjanović	(Spain) Juan Mera
PSBS^{2}					
PSGC	(Chad) Ezechiel N'Douassel	(Costa Rica) Johan Bonilla	(South Korea) Kim Min-hyeok		
PSIS^{3}	(Argentina) Felipe Cadenazzi	(Argentina) Jonathan Bustos	(England) Deri Corfe		(Brazil) Rafinha
PSMS	(Brazil) Phillerson	(Portugal) Ângelo Meneses	(Spain) Javier Siverio		
PSPS	(Brazil) Antônio Gamaroni	(Brazil) Luiz Henrique Motta	(Brazil) Matheus Machado		
RANS Nusantara	(Mali) Ladji Mallé	(Norway) Martin Hoel Andersen	(South Sudan) Amanhom Khamis		
Semen Padang^{4}	(Brazil) Júnior Batista	(Brazil) Sávio Roberto	(Montenegro) Igor Ćuković	(Serbia) Lazar Zličić	
Sumsel United	(Brazil) Felipe Ryan	(Japan) Hibiki Mochizuki	(Nigeria) Kenneth Ngwoke		(Brazil) Gilberto Carrara

Notes:

1. Players who were still under contract but de-registered due to various reasons (such as injury).
2. PSBS is banned from making transfers for 3 registration periods by FIFA.
3. PSIS was initially banned from making transfers for 3 registration periods by FIFA, but their name was now removed from the FIFA Registration Bans website.
4. Semen Padang is banned from making transfers by FIFA.

== League table ==
A total of 20 teams will be divided into two groups based on the geographical location of their homebase. Each group consists of 10 teams, with each team playing against the other teams in their group three times in a triple round-robin format.

=== West Group ===
Pos	Team	Pld	W	D	L	GF	GA	GD	Pts	Promotion, qualification or relegation
1	PSPS	10	7	2	1	20	12	+8	23	Promotion to the 2027–28 Super League and qualification for the final
2	PSMS	10	6	3	1	25	8	+17	21	Qualification for the promotion play-off
3	PSIS (Note: PSIS had 1 point deduction due to licensing issues.)	10	5	3	2	14	8	+6	17	
4	Persikad	9	5	1	3	15	13	+2	16	
5	Semen Padang (Note: Semen Padang had 1 point deduction due to licensing issues.)	10	4	3	3	10	8	+2	14	
6	Sumsel United (Note: Sumsel United had 1 point deduction due to licensing issues.)	10	3	3	4	15	16	−1	11	
7	Persiraja (Note: Persiraja had 1 point deduction due to licensing issues.)	10	3	2	5	13	17	−4	10	
8	Adhyaksa Bekasi	9	1	5	3	9	8	+1	8	
9	PSGC	10	2	1	7	9	17	−8	7	Qualification for the relegation play-off
10	Persiku (Note: Persiku had 2 points deduction due to licensing issues.)	10	1	1	8	8	31	−23	2	Relegation to the 2027–28 Liga Nusantara

Updated to match(es) played on 21 November 2026. Source: Championship 2026–27
Rules for classification: 1) Points; 2) Head-to-head points; 3) Head-to-head goal difference; 4) Head-to-head goals scored; 5) Goal difference; 6) Goals scored; 7) Fair-play points; 8) Draw.

=== East Group ===
Pos	Team	Pld	W	D	L	GF	GA	GD	Pts	Promotion, qualification or relegation
1	Kendal Tornado (Note: Kendal Tornado had 1 point deduction due to licensing issues.)	10	6	4	0	26	5	+21	21	Promotion to the 2027–28 Super League and qualification for the final
2	Barito Putera	10	6	2	2	18	10	+8	20	Qualification for the promotion play-off
3	RANS Nusantara	10	5	4	1	21	13	+8	19 (Note: Ranked on head-to-head points: RANS Nusantara 3, Persela 0.)	
4	Persela (Note: Persela had 1 point deduction due to licensing issues.)	10	6	2	2	20	9	+11	19	
5	Deltras	10	4	3	3	19	16	+3	15	
6	Persipura (Note: Persipura had 1 point deduction due to licensing issues.)	10	4	2	4	22	16	+6	13 (Note: Ranked on head-to-head points: Persipura 3, de Red 0.)	
7	de Red	10	3	4	3	14	12	+2	13	
8	Persis	10	1	5	4	16	15	+1	8	
9	Persiba (Note: Persiba had 4 points deduction due to licensing issues.)	10	2	0	8	8	20	−12	2	Qualification for the relegation play-off
10	PSBS (Note: PSBS had 4 points deduction due to licensing issues.)	10	0	0	10	3	51	−48	−4	Relegation to the 2027–28 Liga Nusantara

Updated to match(es) played on 21 November 2026. Source: Championship 2026–27
Rules for classification: 1) Points; 2) Head-to-head points; 3) Head-to-head goal difference; 4) Head-to-head goals scored; 5) Goal difference; 6) Goals scored; 7) Fair-play points; 8) Draw.

== Results ==
Teams play each other three times, twice in the first half of the season (home and away) and once in the second half of the season (either home or away) with each team playing 27 matches.

=== West Group ===
Home \ Away	ADB	KAD	KDS	ACH	CMS	SMG	MDN	PKU	SMP	SSU
Adhyaksa Bekasi		1–2			4–0		0–1	1–1		1–1
Persikad	1–0		4–0	2–1	2–1			2–3	2–1	
Persiku	1–1			1–3		0–3 (Note: The Persiku vs PSIS match on 27 September 2026 did not take place as planned, and therefore PSIS won on walkover.)			1–2	
Persiraja	0–0				2–1			2–2	0–1	1–2
PSGC			1–2			0–0	1–2		0–2	2–0
PSIS	1–0	0–0		1–3				2–1	1–0	
PSMS		4–0	6–0	5–0		2–1				1–1
PSPS			4–1	2–1	2–1		2–1			
Semen Padang	1–1					1–1	1–1	0–1		1–0
Sumsel United		2–1	5–1			1–4	2–2	1–2		

Updated to match(es) played on 22 November 2026. Source: Championship 2026–27
Legend: Blue = home team win; Yellow = draw; Red = away team win.
For upcoming matches, an "a" indicates there is an article about the rivalry between the two participants.

=== East Group ===
Home \ Away	BAR	RED	DTS	TRD	PSL	BPP	PSP	PSO	BIK	RAN
Barito Putera					0–1	2–0	3–2	2–1		1–1
de Red	0–2			0–1			1–3	1–1	4–0	3–3
Deltras	3–2	0–2			0–3	2–0		3–3		
Kendal Tornado	2–2		2–2		4–1				6–0	
Persela		2–2	1–1				3–1	2–0	6–0	
Persiba	0–1	0–1		0–3	0–1				3–1	
Persipura			2–1	0–0		5–1		1–1		1–3
Persis		0–0		0–2		1–2			7–0	2–2
PSBS	0–3		0–5	0–6			1–6			1–5
RANS Nusantara			1–2	0–0	1–0	3–2	2–1			

Updated to match(es) played on 21 November 2026. Source: Championship 2026–27
Legend: Blue = home team win; Yellow = draw; Red = away team win.
For upcoming matches, an "a" indicates there is an article about the rivalry between the two participants.

== Relegation & promotion play-offs ==
The play-offs will be played as a single match. If tied after regulation time, extra time and, if necessary, a penalty shoot-out will be used to decide the winning team. Both promotion and relegation play-offs will be held at neutral venue.

=== Relegation play-off ===
The loser will be relegated to the 2027–28 Liga Nusantara.

8 May 2027

9th-place of West Group	v	9th-place of East Group

=== Promotion play-off ===
The winner will be promoted to the 2027–28 Super League.

8 May 2027

Runner-up of West Group	v	Runner-up of East Group

== Final ==
The final will be played as a single match. If tied after regulation time, extra time and, if necessary, a penalty shoot-out will be used to decide the winning team.

9 May 2027

Winner of West Group	v	Winner of East Group

== Attendances ==
=== Overall ===
Pos	Team	Total	High	Low	Average	Change
1	PSIS	33,048	14,874	8,051	11,016	+237.4%
2	Persela	27,488	11,200	5,673	9,163	n/a^{★}
3	Semen Padang	25,823	15,123	10,700	12,912	n/a^{†}
4	PSGC	20,868	11,263	9,605	10,434	n/a^{‡}
5	PSPS	19,545	13,040	6,505	9,773	+68.8%
6	Barito Putera	16,802	6,674	4,425	5,361	+8.1%
7	Persis	13,875	7,062	1,215	4,625	n/a^{†}
8	Persiraja	7,800	5,763	2,037	3,900	+13.0%
9	PSMS	7,277	5,160	2,117	3,639	+53.2%
10	Persiba	6,690	6,640	50	3,345	+15.7%
11	Deltras	5,449	2,732	2,718	2,725	+0.9%
12	Sumsel United	4,180	1,451	1,339	1,393	+10.0%
13	Adhyaksa Bekasi	3,323	1,333	977	1,108	+77.6%
14	Persikad	2,683	1,062	559	894	+14.6%
15	RANS Nusantara	1,783	1,565	218	892	n/a^{‡}
16	de Red	673	333	136	224	n/a^{‡}
17	Kendal Tornado	401	325	76	201	+107.2%
18	Persiku	243	200	43	122	−94.9%
19	Persipura	0	0	0	0	−100.0%
20	PSBS	0	0	0	0	n/a^{†}
	League total	220,914	15,123	43	3,744	+23.4%

Updated to games played on 18 October 2026
Source: Championship 2026–27
Notes:
^{†} Teams played previous season in Super League
^{‡} Teams played previous season in Liga Nusantara
^{★} Persela was sanctioned with a ban on having spectators attend all of its home matches last season.
Attendants who entered with free ticket are not counted.

=== Home match played ===
As of 18 October 2026

Team \ Match played	Regular phase														Play-offs & Final	Total
Team \ Match played	1	2	3	4	5	6	7	8	9	10	11	12	13	14	Play-offs & Final	Total
Adhyaksa Bekasi	977	1,333	1,013													3,323
Barito Putera	6,674	5,703	4,425													16,082
de Red	204	136	333	155												828
Deltras	2,718	2,731	11,206													16,655
Kendal Tornado	325	76														401
Persela	10,615	5,673	11,200													27,488
Persiba	6,640	50	0^{2}													6,690
Persikad	1,062	559	1,061													2,683
Persiku	200	43														243
Persipura	0^{1}	0^{1}	0^{1}	0^{1}	0^{1}											0
Persiraja	5,763	2,037	3,089													10,889
Persis	7,062	5,598	1,215													13,875
PSBS	0^{2}	0^{2}	0^{2}													0
PSGC	9,605	11,263	10,921													20,868
PSMS	2,117	5,160														7,277
PSIS	14,874	10,123	8,051													33,048
PSPS	6,505	13,040	7,870													19,545
RANS Nusantara	218	1,565	2,265													4,048
Semen Padang	10,700	15,123	5,907													31,730
Sumsel United	1,451	1,339	1,390	1,061												5,241
League total																220,914

Source: Championship 2026–27

Notes

1. Based on Persipura's appeal result, Persipura received sanctions in the form of five home matches without spectators and a fine of IDR 200 million.
2. Match played behind closed doors.

== Season statistics ==
=== Top scorers ===
As of 23 November 2026

Rank	Player	Club	Goals
1	(Spain) Javier Siverio	PSMS Medan	15
2	(Norway) Martin Hoel Andersen	Rans Nusantara	11
3	(Brazil) Antônio Gamaroni	PSPS Pekanbaru	10
4	(Ivory Coast) Bernard Doumbia	Persis Solo	8
5	(Brazil) Juninho Cabral	Persela Lamongan	7
5	(Brazil) Alexsandro	Persipura Jayapura	7
5	(Brazil) Phillerson	PSMS Medan	7
8	(Brazil) Renan Alves	Barito Putera	6
8	(Brazil) Fellipe Veloso	De Red	6
8	(Brazil) Patrick Cruz	Kendal Tornado	6
11	(Brazil) Murilo	Barito Putera	5
11	(Indonesia) Nico Sitepu	Persikad Depok	5
11	(Chad) Ezechiel N'Douassel	PSGC Ciamis	5
14	Seven Players		4

=== Hat-tricks ===
Player	For	Against	Result	Date
(Spain) Javier Siverio	PSMS	Persiku	6–0 (H)	20 September 2026
(Ivory Coast) Bernard Doumbia^{4}	Persis	PSBS	7–0 (H)	20 September 2026
(Norway) Martin Hoel Andersen	RANS Nusantara	PSBS	5–1 (A)	3 October 2026
(Spain) Javier Siverio	PSMS	Persikad	4–0 (H)	3 October 2026
(Brazil) Alexsandro	Persipura	PSBS	6–1 (A)	17 October 2026
(Ivory Coast) Bernard Doumbia	Persis	Deltras	3–3 (A)	18 October 2026
(Brazil) Fellipe Veloso^{4}	de Red	PSBS	4–0 (H)	7 November 2026
(Spain) Javier Siverio^{4}	PSMS	Persiraja	5–0 (H)	7 November 2026

Note:
^{4} Player scored 4 goals

== See also ==
- 2026–27 Super League
- 2026–27 Liga Nusantara
- 2026–27 Liga 4
- 2026–27 I-League Cup
