= Bryan Cesar =

Indonesian association footballer

Personal information
- Full name: Bryan Cesar Ramadhan
- Date of birth: 16 March 1993 (age 33)
- Place of birth: Balikpapan, Indonesia
- Height: 1.70 m (5 ft 7 in)
- Position: Midfielder

Team information
- Current team: Persiba Balikpapan
- Number: 8

Youth career
- 2011: Persiba Balikpapan
- 2012–2014: Barito Putera
- 2016: PON Kalimantan Timur

Senior career*
Years	Team	Apps	(Gls)
2015–2021	Persiba Balikpapan	74	(5)
2022–2023	PSM Makassar	8	(0)
2023–2024	PSIM Yogyakarta	16	(2)
2024–	Persiba Balikpapan	19	(1)
- * Club domestic league appearances and goals as of 13 September 2026

Bryan Cesar Ramadhan (born 16 March 1993) is an Indonesian professional footballer who plays as a midfielder for Championship club Persiba Balikpapan.

== Career statistics ==
=== Club ===
As of match played 13 September 2026

Club	Season	League		Cup (Note: Includes Piala Indonesia)		Continental		Other		Total	
Club	Season	Apps	Goals	Apps	Goals	Apps	Goals	Apps	Goals	Apps	Goals
Persiba Balikpapan	2015	0	0	0	0	—		0	0	0	0
Persiba Balikpapan	2017	30	3	0	0	—		0	0	30	3
Persiba Balikpapan	2018	21	1	0	0	—		0	0	21	1
Persiba Balikpapan	2019	11	1	0	0	—		0	0	11	1
Persiba Balikpapan	2020	1	0	0	0	—		0	0	1	0
Persiba Balikpapan	2021	11	0	0	0	—		0	0	11	0
Persiba Balikpapan	Total	74	5	0	0	—		0	0	74	5
PSM Makassar	2022–23	8	0	0	0	3 (Note: Appearances in AFC Cup)	0	3 (Note: Appearances in Indonesia President's Cup)	0	14	0
PSIM Yogyakarta	2023–24	16	2	0	0	–		0	0	16	2
Persiba Balikpapan	2024–25	11	0	0	0	–		0	0	11	0
Persiba Balikpapan	2025–26	7	1	0	0	–		0	0	7	1
Persiba Balikpapan	2026–27	1	0	0	0	–		0	0	1	0
Career total		117	8	0	0	3	0	3	0	123	8

== Honours ==
PSM Makassar

- Liga 1: 2022–23

Persiba Balikpapan

- Liga Nusantara Promotion play-offs: 2024–25
