= Prince Kallon =

Indonesian footballer

Personal information
- Full name: Prince Patrick Kallon
- Date of birth: 3 February 2002 (age 24)
- Place of birth: Tabanan, Indonesia
- Height: 1.74 m (5 ft 9 in)
- Position: Winger

Team information
- Current team: Persiba Balikpapan
- Number: 9

Youth career
- 2012–2017: SSB Kallon
- 2017–2021: PSM Makassar

Senior career*
Years	Team	Apps	(Gls)
2022–2026	PSM Makassar	6	(0)
2022–2023	→ Dewa United (loan)	0	(0)
2023–2026	→ Persijap Jepara (loan)	32	(5)
2026–	Persiba Balikpapan	0	(0)
- * Club domestic league appearances and goals as of 12 January 2026

Prince Patrick Kallon (born 3 February 2002) is an Indonesian professional footballer who plays as a winger for Championship club Persiba Balikpapan.

== Club career ==
=== PSM Makassar ===
He signed for PSM Makassar in 2021. He made his professional debut on 18 January 2022 in a match against Persik Kediri, coming on as a substitute for Rizky Eka Pratama in the 66th minute.

==== Loan to Dewa United ====
Kallon signed a season-long loan deal with Dewa United for the 2022–23 Liga I season.

== Career statistics ==
=== Club ===
As of 12 January 2026

Club	Season	League			Cup		Continental		Other		Total	
Club	Season	Division	Apps	Goals	Apps	Goals	Apps	Goals	Apps	Goals	Apps	Goals
PSM Makassar	2021–22	Liga 1	6	0	0	0	–		0	0	6	0
Dewa United (loan)	2022–23	Liga 1	0	0	0	0	–		0	0	0	0
Persijap Jepara (loan)	2023–24	Liga 2	12	3	0	0	–		0	0	12	3
Persijap Jepara (loan)	2024–25	Liga 2	17	2	0	0	–		0	0	17	2
Persijap Jepara (loan)	2025–26	Super League	3	0	0	0	–		0	0	3	0
Persiba Balikpapan	2026–27	Championship	0	0	0	0	–		0	0	0	0
Career total			38	5	0	0	0	0	0	0	38	5

== Honours ==
Persijap Jepara

- Liga 2 Promotion play-offs: 2024–25

== Personal life ==
Kallon has a Sierra Leonean blood from his father Musa Kallon, a PSM Makassar legend at that time and the nephew of former Inter Milan player Mohamed Kallon.
