= Korneles Howay =

Indonesian footballer (born 2008)

Personal information
- Date of birth: 14 October 2008 (age 18)
- Place of birth: Manokwari, Indonesia
- Height: 1.69 m (5 ft 7 in)
- Positions: Left winger; striker

Team information
- Current team: Barito Putera
- Number: 8

Youth career
- SSB Doberay
- 2025–2026: Barito Putera U19

Senior career*
Years	Team	Apps	(Gls)
2026–	Barito Putera	3	(3)
- * Club domestic league appearances and goals as of 26 September 2026

Korneles Howay (born 14 October 2008) is an Indonesian professional footballer who plays as a left winger or striker for Championship club Barito Putera.

== Club career ==
=== Early career ===
Howay spent his early youth training at SSB Doberay, a local youth football academy based in Manokwari, West Papua. His talent was recognized by elite scouts, leading to his recruitment into the youth academy of Barito Putera.

=== Barito Putera ===
Howay initially starred for Barito Putera's youth squad in the Elite Pro Academy (EPA). During the 2025–26 EPA U19 Championship, he finished the tournament as the joint-top scorer with 9 goals and 3 assists in 8 appearances.

Following his exceptional performances in the youth league, Howay was promoted to the senior squad on 12 June 2026 ahead of the 2026–27 Championship campaign. On 12 September 2026, he made his professional debut in the starting lineup against Persipura Jayapura. He scored a brace in the 23rd and 65th minutes, guiding his team to a 3–2 victory at the 17th May Stadium. Howay was named the Championship "Young Player of the Week" for the opening gameweek. On 26 September, he scored equalizer in a 2–2 away draw over Kendal Tornado at the Sriwedari Stadium.

== Career statistics ==
=== Club ===
As of 26 September 2026

Club	Season	League			Cup		Continental		Other		Total	
Club	Season	Division	Apps	Goals	Apps	Goals	Apps	Goals	Apps	Goals	Apps	Goals
Barito Putera	2026–27	Championship	3	3	0	0	–		0	0	3	3
Career total			3	3	0	0	0	0	0	0	3	3
