= Marginal budgeting for bottlenecks =

The marginal budgeting for bottlenecks tool (MBB) is an analytical costing and budgeting tool that helps countries develop their health plans by taking into account the most effective interventions, cost and budget marginal allocations of their implementation to health services and assess their potential impact on health coverage, Health related Millennium Development Goals (MDGs) and health outcomes of the poor. It builds on the High Impact Interventions to reduce mortality as published in various scientific articles including The Lancet series on Child, Maternal and neonatal survival. The tool has been developed in the context of Highly Indebted Poor Country Initiative and Poverty Reduction Strategy Papers

== Concept ==
The MBB mainly addresses the following six questions:

- Who does what? Which high impact interventions can be integrated into existing providers/service delivery arrangements to accelerate progress towards the health MDGs?
- Equity
- What are the major hurdles or "bottlenecks" hampering the delivery of health services, and what is the potential for their improvement?
- How much money is needed for the expected results?
- How much can be achieved in health outcomes such as mortality reduction by removing the bottlenecks?
- Which amounts of financing is it possible to mobilize and how should these be allocated and channelled ?

It builds on theoretical knowledge:

- The Tanahashi model of evaluating the health service delivery performance by looking at 5 determinants of the health system
- The implementation of effective interventions also called High Impact Interventions
- Fiscal Space where governments can collect the money to implement the marginal cost required

== Development ==
It has initially been developed by teams from the World Bank's Africa Region, South Asia region and Health Nutrition and Population Anchor, jointly with UNICEF and the World Health Organization. It is a development of health systems performance monitoring tools that were used in the West African Region in the nineties. At a certain point, WHO left the boat to develop their own approach. Since 2008, the MBB has the possibility to use the LiST tool to calculate impacts. Currently, there are discussions going on to produce an integrated model that would reunify different models proposed by different agencies (UNICEF, WHO, UNAIDS? UNFPA into one comprehensive planning and budgeting tool. Since 2008, the tool is available in three languages.

Until now, the tool runs on Excel ₢ which makes it vulnerable to users' ability to correctly input data. (MBB 5, the current version, runs on Excel 2007 ₢ or later). DevInfo has been tasked to provide support to users; they have developed an online support platform where the latest version can be downloaded along with on-the-job support.

== Use ==
Since its inception in 2002, the tool has been used at country and sub-country level in more than 17 countries across Africa and Asia. It has been used to prepare mid-term expenditures frameworks, investment cases, child survival strategic plans, national health plans,....

== Key steps ==
The MBB consists of five key steps:

- An assessment of the key indicators of your health system at the baseline
- Identification of system-wide supply and demand bottlenecks
- Selection of interventions and the estimation of the expected impact on survival rates for each of the interventions.
- Selection of the types, quantities and costs of additional inputs,
- Analysis of budgetary implications, and the comparison of the marginal costs to the ’fiscal space’
