= MBB =

MBB may refer to:

== Television ==
- Men Behaving Badly, a British television sitcom
- Mrs. Brown's Boys, a television sitcom

== Brands and enterprises ==
- Malayan Banking Berhad, a bank and financial group in Malaysia
- McKinsey, Boston Consulting Group, and Bain, the world's three largest strategy consulting firms, referred to as "MBB". See Big Three (management consultancies)
- Meridien Bank Burundi, a defunct bank in Burundi
- Messerschmitt-Bölkow-Blohm, a former West German aircraft company, now part of Airbus
- MBB Architects, an American architecture firm

== Other uses ==
- Magandang Balita Biblia, a Tagalog translation of the Holy Bible
- Maharaja Bir Bikram University, in Tripura, India
- Make-before-break, a type of contact arrangement of an electrical switch
- Marginal Budgeting for Bottlenecks, a planning and costing tool to "buy health results"
- Master Black Belt, a certification in the study of Six Sigma and Lean Six Sigma
- Medal for Bravery (Bronze), an honour in Hong Kong
- Men's Basketball, men's college basketball
- Millie Bobby Brown, an English actress
- Minimum bounding box, the box or hyperrectangle of minimal dimensions that contains the set of interest
- Mobile broadband, the name used to describe various types of wireless high-speed internet access through a portable modem, telephone, or other device
- Molecular Biology and Biochemistry, the name of departments in several universities
- Montgomery bus boycott
