= Abdeen Abdul =

Irish footballer

Personal information
- Full name: Abdeen Temitope Abdul
- Date of birth: 30 April 1995 (age 31)
- Place of birth: Nigeria
- Height: 1.89 m (6 ft 2 in)
- Position: Forward

Youth career
- Navan Town
- 2015–2016: Cork City
- 2018–2019: Bedfont Sports

Senior career*
Years	Team	Apps	(Gls)
2019–2020	Nybergsund	1	(0)
2020–2021	Gżira United	1	(0)
2020	→ Pembroke Athleta (loan)	20	(13)
2021–2022	Gudja United	12	(1)
2022	Pietà Hotspurs	9	(7)
2022–2023	Skënderbeu	24	(12)
2023–2024	Penang	8	(2)
2024	Dalvík/Reynir	9	(4)
2024–2025	Ferizaj	29	(5)
2025–2026	Intercity	6	(0)
2026	Feronikeli 74	0	(0)
2026	Deltras	0	(0)
- * Club domestic league appearances and goals as of 11 January 2026

Abdeen Temitope Abdul (born 30 April 1995) is an Nigerian-born Irish professional footballer who plays as a forward.

== Club career ==
=== Early career and Europe ===
Abdul began his football development in Ireland, featuring with Navan Town during his youth years. In early 2015, he spent the pre-season training period with League of Ireland club Cork City, though he eventually returned to amateur football. Then, he moved abroad to mainland Europe, joined Norwegian club Nybergsund in 2019 season. And in 2020 season, he move to Malta, joined Maltese Premier League side Gżira United. He made his league debut for Gżira United on 26 September 2020 as a starter in a 1–1 draw over Tarxien Rainbows. That same year, Abdul was loaned to Pembroke Athleta. He scored his first league goal in his debut match on 4 October 2020 against Marsaxlokk despite draw 1–1. After his contract with Gzira United was not renewed, he played for another Maltese club Gudja United in 2021 and Pietà Hotspurs in 2022.

=== Penang ===
In July 2023, Abdul officially completed a transfer to Malaysia Super League club Penang, he previously plays for Albanian club Skënderbeu. On 9 August 2023, he made his club debut, coming on as a starter of a 1–3 loss at Perak. Abdul scored his first league goal on 26 November 2023, scored a brace in a game against Sri Pahang.

=== Back to Europe ===
Abdul subsequently back to Europe, represented Dalvík/Reynir, before signing with Kosovan club Ferizaj in August 2024.

=== Deltras ===
In August 2026, Abdul move to Indonesia and signed a contract with Deltras ahead of the 2026–27 Championship campaign. He was registered as one of the club's key foreign allocations, brought in to serve as a target man and spearhead the team's offensive line.
