= Meru Kimura =

Japanese footballer

Personal information
- Full name: Meru Kimura
- Date of birth: 27 June 2001 (age 25)
- Place of birth: Tokyo, Japan
- Height: 1.87 m (6 ft 2 in)
- Position: Centre-back

Team information
- Current team: Persiba Balikpapan
- Number: 27

Youth career
- 2019–2025: Bali United Youth

Senior career*
Years	Team	Apps	(Gls)
2020–2021	Persik Kediri	0	(0)
2021–2022	PSKC Cimahi	2	(0)
2022–2023	RANS Nusantara	0	(0)
2023	→ PSIS Semarang (loan)	7	(0)
2023	→ Sriwijaya (loan)	4	(0)
2024	Bali United	0	(0)
2025–2026	Persitara North Jakarta	14	(0)
2026	Persipal Palu	5	(1)
2026–	Persiba Balikpapan	1	(0)
- * Club domestic league appearances and goals as of 13 September 2026

Meru Kimura (Japanese: 木村メル; born 28 June 2001) is a Japanese professional footballer who plays as a centre-back for Championship clubs Persiba Balikpapan.

== Club career ==
=== PSKC Cimahi ===
Ahead of the third match of Group B of the 2021–22 Liga 2 competition, PSKC Cimahi has officially signed a young player with Japanese blood, Meru Kimura. Before joining PSKC Cimahi, Meru Kimura played for Bali United Youth and had played for Persik Kediri. In addition, he also took part in the selection at Persebaya Surabaya.

=== RANS Nusantara F.C. ===
He was signed for RANS Nusantara to play in 2022–23 Liga 1.

=== PSIS Semarang (loan) ===
PSIS Semarang has again brought in players in the 2022–23 Liga 1 half-season transfer market. This time Laskar Mahesa Jenar brought in defender Meru Kimura on loan from RANS Nusantara. The 21-year-old player was brought in to add depth to the squad at the back. Meru made his professional debut on 16 January 2023 in a match against RANS Nusantara at the Pakansari Stadium, Bogor.

== Career statistics ==
=== Club ===
As of 13 September 2026

Club	Season	League			Cup		Continental		Other		Total	
Club	Season	Division	Apps	Goals	Apps	Goals	Apps	Goals	Apps	Goals	Apps	Goals
Persik Kediri	2020	Liga 1	0	0	0	0	–		0	0	0	0
PSKC Cimahi	2021–22	Liga 2	2	0	0	0	–		0	0	2	0
RANS Nusantara	2022–23	Liga 1	0	0	0	0	–		0	0	0	0
PSIS Semarang (loan)	2022–23	Liga 1	7	0	0	0	–		0	0	7	0
Sriwijaya (loan)	2023–24	Liga 2	4	0	0	0	–		0	0	4	0
Persitara North Jakarta	2025–26	Liga Nusantara	14	0	0	0	–		0	0	14	0
Persipal Palu	2025–26	Championship	5	1	0	0	–		0	0	5	1
Persiba Balikpapan	2026–27	Championship	1	0	0	0	–		0	0	1	0
Career total			33	1	0	0	0	0	0	0	33	1
