= Yus Arfandy Djafar =

Indonesian footballer

Personal information
- Full name: Yus Arfandy Djafar
- Date of birth: 11 January 1987 (age 39)
- Place of birth: Makassar, Indonesia
- Height: 1.66 m (5 ft 5 1/2 in)
- Position: Midfielder

Senior career*
Years	Team	Apps	(Gls)
2008–2009	PSM Makassar	20	(7)
2009–2010	Persidafon Dafonsoro	32	(9)
2010–2011	Mitra Kukar	17	(0)
2011–2012	Bontang FC	21	(2)
2013	Persiba Balikpapan	26	(1)
2014	Persisam Samarinda	19	(0)
2014–2015	Persiram Raja Ampat	13	(2)
2016–2017	Persita Tangerang	33	(0)
2017	PS TNI	6	(0)
2018	Persiba Balikpapan	26	(1)
2019	Persita Tangerang	24	(0)
- * Club domestic league appearances and goals

Yus Arfandy Djafar (born 11 January 1987) is an Indonesian former footballer who plays as a midfielder. He previously played for PSM Makassar, Persidafon, Mitra Kukar, Bontang FC, Persiba, Persisam, Persiram and Persita
