= DevInfo =

- Founded: 2001
- Area served: Worldwide
- Website: DevInfo.org

DevInfo was a database system developed under the auspices of the United Nations and endorsed by the United Nations Development Group for monitoring human development with the specific purpose of monitoring the Millennium Development Goals (MDGs), which is a set of Human Development Indicators. DevInfo was a tool for organizing, storing and presenting data in a uniform way to facilitate data sharing at the country level across government departments, UN agencies and development partners. It was distributed royalty-free to all UN member states. It was a further development of the earlier UNICEF database system ChildInfo.

The Global DevInfo Initiative, led by UNICEF on behalf of the UN system, is dedicated to furthering human development by offering information technology-based solutions aimed at addressing development-related challenges. This is achieved by integrating management information systems, geographic information systems, software training, technical support services, data dissemination solutions and technical publications. The DevInfo Initiative takes a strategic approach towards strengthening the monitoring and evaluation capacity of governments and agencies by developing innovative technological solutions to better track human development progress.

== Description and history ==
The DevInfo Initiative supported a vision of a day when national and local governments use internationally accepted common database standards for tracking human development indicators, containing high-quality data with adequate coverage and depth to sustain good governance around the agenda of achieving development goals.

DevInfo strived to add value to national statistics systems by complementing existing databases and bridging data dissemination gaps, with the objective of more fully engaging both government and civil society in policy choices for human development that yield measurable results.

DevInfo implementation is supported by trained experts at the country, regional, and global levels, and through support services provided by the DevInfo Support Group consisting of international staff located around the world.

Since DevInfo was retired in 2015, the home page has a DevInfo Data Request Form for authorized national statistical agency administrators to request migration of active DevInfo sites.

== Ownership ==
The UN System maintains proprietary ownership of the DevInfo software, which is managed in its behalf by UNICEF, with the support of the UNDG.

== Application and use ==
The DevInfo software is free software that can be downloaded from the DevInfo website. The software is easily customizable, allowing DevInfo to have been adapted to over 370 customized adaptations so far.

By the end of October 2012, over 120 countries had developed national statistical data systems based on DevInfo. They include:

- Benin (BenInfo, 2008)
- Brazil (ODMInfo, 2010)
- Cambodia (CamInfo, 2010)
- Russian Federation (MCInfo, 2009)
- Pacific Islands (PacificInfo, 2010)

By the end of October 2012, over 200 trainings had been conducted in the use of DevInfo.

In addition to the adaptations made using the DevInfo platform are some customized data visualization applications developed by the DevInfo initiative such as:

- CME Info which allows users to generate estimate graphs on child mortality indicators.
- MICS Compiler provides easy access to viewing data on key indicators collected through UNICEF's Multiple Indicator Cluster Surveys.
- data visualization tool which allows users to view and present data in animated scatter plots, to explore trends over time.
- CensusInfo - is an innovative and flexible database technology for the dissemination of population and housing census results.
- EmergencyInfo is a powerful decision support system, based on DevInfo database technology that helps people to respond better in emergency situations.
- Polio Communication Info is a DevInfo 6.0 adaptation launched jointly by the Government of India and UNICEF intended to monitor and track polio eradication programmes in Northern India.

== Release history and future releases ==
(1995–2003)

ChildInfo - UNICEF developed a database to monitor the World Summit for Children goals and offered the technology to the UN system to monitor human development. ChildInfo is a database management system launched in 1995 by UNICEF to monitor the worldwide situation of children and women. ChildInfo was the system which preceded DevInfo. It provides powerful features to organize data on social indicators and query data by indicator, time period and area. Correct interpretation of the data generated by ChildInfo helps governments protect the rights, improve health, and nurture development of children and women.

(2004–2005)

DevInfo 4.0 - ChildInfo was upgraded and launched as DevInfo 4.0 with UN Development Group endorsement in April 2004. The system provides access to indicators organized by sectors, goals, themes and other data management schemes. DevInfo 4.0 is a user-friendly software application for easy presentation of data in tables, graphs and maps, which can be included in MDG reports, presentations and advocacy materials. DevInfo 4.0 contributed to setting universal standards for data storage, access and dissemination of human development indicators, specifically the MDGs.

(2006–2008)

DevInfo 5.0 - This updated version featuring state-of-the-art database technology was launched in May 2006 with royalty-free distribution as a desktop application and on the web. DevInfo 5.0 offers an intuitive user interface providing easy navigations to search for data and produce customizable tables, graphs and maps. Compliant with emerging international standards for metadata (SDMX), the system contains a powerful data exchange module enabling users to easily share data across a variety of formats.

(2009)

DevInfo 6.0 - A powerful new version of DevInfo database technology, DevInfo 6.0 delivers significant enhancements for easy access to information on human development. Building on the technology of DevInfo 5.0, DevInfo 6.0 contains significant advancements in usability with a reduced learning curve for first-time users. The database system boasts greatly improved performance for large data sets and includes new animated data presentation objects. Two toolbars contain buttons which help users easily navigate through the system to search for data, analyze the results, and create presentation objects.

(2012)

DevInfo 7.0 - The most advanced version of DevInfo yet, DevInfo 7.0 is web-based and introduces exciting new features such as the ability to upload one's own data to visualize it without creating a database. With My Data, copy and paste your data into DevInfo to generate a data visualization on the fly with automatic mapping of geographical areas. DevInfo 7.0 makes available twenty-two visualization tools and introduces the catalog, which provides a large amount of online national and subnational data from countries around the world. Search the catalog to find data across multiple databases, and contribute your own database to the DevInfo worldwide catalog. In addition to this, the new Quick Data Search feature allows users to find their data instantly.

(2015)

DevInfo is no longer supported after 2015 since it was designed to manage Millennium Development Goals, which were retired in 2015. The focus since 2015 is on Sustainable Development Goals, rather than Millennium Development Goals.

== Social media ==
DevInfo uses social media networking such as Facebook and Twitter to allow users to connect with each other and share experiences and difficulties in human development.
