= Gustavo França (footballer, born 2002) =

Brazilian footballer (born 2002)

Personal information
- Full name: Gustavo Evaristo de França
- Date of birth: 30 June 2002 (age 24)
- Place of birth: São Paulo, Brazil
- Height: 1.88 m (6 ft 2 in)
- Position: Forward

Team information
- Current team: Persikad Depok
- Number: 9

Youth career
- –2019: América-SP
- 2020: Itumbiara
- 2021–2022: São Caetano

Senior career*
| Years | Team | Apps | (Gls) |
| 2022 | São Caetano | 3 | (0) |
| 2023–2026 | São Bernardo | 8 | (0) |
| 2023–2024 | → Tondela (loan) | 6 | (0) |
| 2024–2025 | → União de Santarém (loan) | 22 | (5) |
| 2025 | → Cherno More (loan) | 12 | (1) |
| 2026 | → Caspiy (loan) | 6 | (0) |
| 2026– | Persikad Depok | 4 | (1) |
- * Club domestic league appearances and goals as of 3 October 2026

Gustavo Evaristo de França (born 30 June 2002) is a Brazilian professional footballer who plays as a forward for Championship club Persikad Depok.

== Career ==
=== São Bernardo ===
Born in São Paulo, França played youth football for América-SP, Itumbiara and São Caetano. On 6 July 2022, he made his professional debut for São Caetano, coming on as a late substitute in a 0–0 away draw against Oeste in the Copa Paulista. In November 2022, he joined São Bernardo.

=== Tondela ===
On 5 July 2023, França signed for Liga Portugal 2 club Tondela on loan for the 2023–24 season. On 29 July 2023, he made his debut for the club when he came on as an 81st-minute substitute in a 4–2 penalty shoot-out win against Santa Clara in the first round of the 2023–24 Taça da Liga at Estádio de São Miguel. During the season he played just ten matches for Tondela in all competitions.

=== São Bernardo return ===
In July 2024, França returned to São Bernardo.

=== União de Santarém ===
In September 2024, he signed for Liga 3 club União de Santarém in Portugal on a season-long loan.

=== Cherno More loan ===
On 14 June 2025, França joined Bulgarian club Cherno More Varna, signing on loan. França missed the club's European games in the Conference League because he couldn't get registered. On 27 July 2025 França made his debut in a 2-1 home win against Botev Plovdiv in the 2nd round of the First League coming on in the 67th minute. On 29 August 2025 França played his match as a starter in a 1-0 away lose against Botev Vratsa in the 7th round playing only 45 minutes. On 29 October 2025 França scored his first goal for Cherno More in the Round of 32 of the Bulgarian Cup against Minyor Pernik, scoring from a penalty in the 51st minute. On 3 December 2025 França scored his 1st league goal against Beroe in the 17th round scoring a 90+3 minute scoring winner for 2-1 away win. On 4 January 2026 França left Cherno More because he didn't receive enough playing time and returned to São Bernardo.

=== São Bernardo second return ===
On 4 January 2026 França returned again to São Bernardo after his 6 month loan in Cherno More after agreement between the 2 clubs.

=== Persikad Depok ===
On 8 September 2026, França completed a transfer to Southeast Asia, officially signing with Indonesian side Persikad Depok ahead of the 2026–27 Championship campaign.
