= Martin Hoel Andersen =

Norwegian footballer (born 1995)

Personal information
- Full name: Jan Martin Hoel Andersen
- Date of birth: 4 December 1995 (age 30)
- Place of birth: Halden, Norway
- Height: 1.89 m (6 ft 2 in)
- Position: Forward

Team information
- Current team: RANS Nusantara
- Number: 9

Youth career
- –2011: Tistedalen
- Sarpsborg 08

Senior career*
Years	Team	Apps	(Gls)
2011	Tistedalen	1	(0)
2012–2014	Sarpsborg 08 2	37	(32)
2013–2015	Sarpsborg 08	1	(0)
2015	→ Kvik Halden (loan)	23	(8)
2015	→ Kvik Halden 2 (loan)	2	(7)
2016	Kvik Halden	24	(11)
2016	Kvik Halden 2	3	(0)
2017–2019	Jerv	50	(4)
2017–2019	Jerv 2	15	(11)
2020	Øygarden	13	(5)
2020–2022	Kongsvinger	41	(20)
2023–2024	Sarpsborg 08	14	(0)
2023	→ Kongsvinger (loan)	15	(4)
2024	Östers	11	(1)
2025	Skeid	29	(11)
2026	Suwon FC	3	(0)
2026–	RANS Nusantara	4	(6)
- * Club domestic league appearances and goals as of 3 October 2026

Jan Martin Hoel Andersen (born 4 December 1995) is a Norwegian professional footballer who plays as a forward for Championship club RANS Nusantara.

== Club career ==
He played youth and senior football Tistedalen TIF before joining Sarpsborg 08 FF's junior setup. He also made his senior debut in May 2013 against Haugesund. After this one game he was sent on loan to Kvik Halden FK in the entire 2015 season, permanently in 2016. Scoring double digits in the 2016 2. divisjon, he went up one tier when signing for FK Jerv.

On 7 January 2025, Hoel Andersen signed with Skeid Fotball. On 23 February 2026, Hoel Andersen signed with the K League 2 club Suwon FC.

On 15 August 2026, Hoel Andersen officially completed a transfer to Indonesian Championship club RANS Nusantara. On 13 September 2026, Hoel Andersen scored his first goal in his debut against Persiba Balikpapan, a match that ended in a 3–2 win for RANS Nusantara.
