= Persiba Balikpapan =

Association football team in Indonesia

- Full name: Persatuan Sepakbola Indonesia Balikpapan
- Nicknames: Beruang Madu (The Sun Bear); Selicin Minyak (Slippery as Oil)
- Short name: PBA; PSBA; BPP
- Founded: 3 August 1950; 76 years ago
- Ground: Batakan Stadium
- Capacity: 40,000
- Owner: PT Persiba Beriman
- Chairman: Riyandi Ramadhana
- Head coach: Sudirman
- League: Championship
- 2025–26: Championship Group 1, 9th of 10
- Website: www.persiba.co.id
Home colours	Away colours

Persatuan Sepakbola Indonesia Balikpapan, commonly known as Persiba Balikpapan, is a professional football club based in Balikpapan, East Kalimantan, Indonesia. The club competes in the Championship, the second tier of Indonesian football.

The club is nicknamed Beruang Madu (The Sun Bear), taken from the city mascot of Balikpapan. Founded in 1950, the club plays its home games at Batakan Stadium, which has a capacity of 40,000. In the media, a tautology is often used to distinguish the club from another club with the same acronym, Persiba Bantul. The club also carries the nickname Selicin Minyak (Slippery as Oil), a reference to Balikpapan's status as the centre of Indonesia's oil and gas industry.

Persiba plays in all-blue kits at home. Their rivals are Borneo and Mitra Kukar, two clubs also based in East Kalimantan.

== History ==
=== Early years ===
The club, known as Tim Selicin Minyak, was founded on 3 August 1950. Since its founding, the club has competed in various tournaments at the provincial and national levels. Before adopting the name Persiba Balikpapan, the club was originally known as PS Belalang, before changing its name in 1963.

=== 1980s: Golden era ===
The 1980s represented the golden age of Persiba. The club's rise began with the 1983 Third Division title. In the final standings, Persiba faced stiff competition from hosts Persisam Samarinda, who needed a 7–0 victory in the last match to claim first place. Although Persisam came close, PSTK Tarakan prevented the final goal, and the match ended 6–0, leaving Persiba at the top.

The Third Division title earned Persiba a place in the central regional round, hosted by Persipal Palu and Persigo Gorontalo. Despite playing away from home, Persiba defeated each host side 1–0. The club went on to win the Second Division trophy in 1984, earning promotion to the First Division in Yogyakarta.

Persiba continued their strong run and advanced through each round until reaching the final at Diponegoro Stadium in Semarang on Wednesday, 4 December 1985. Their opponents were PSIM Yogyakarta, a well-respected side at the time. Persiba legend Junaedi scored the only goal of the match in the 72nd minute, securing a 1–0 victory and the First Division title. Johny Rinning was named the best player of the tournament, capping a remarkable individual season. Playing as a libero, Rinning collected four best player awards: the Gorontalo Regent's Cup in 1984, the First Division in 1985, the Surabaya Mayor's Cup in 1985, and the East Kalimantan Governor's award.

With their First Division title, Persiba earned a place in the top flight of Indonesian football. During this period, the Persiba Stadium was constructed under the chairmanship of Syarifuddin Yoes, who also served as Mayor of Balikpapan. The stadium was built on Parikesit Street, on land owned by PT Pertamina, and was completed within a year to meet the requirements for Premier Division participants.

In the top flight, Persiba performed respectably, finishing in the top six on two occasions — in the 1987–88 and 1989–90 seasons.

=== Liga Indonesia era ===
From the 1994–95 season, the Perserikatan and Galatama competitions were merged to form the Liga Indonesia Premier Division. During this era, Persiba struggled to maintain their place in the top tier, consistently finishing one or two positions above the relegation zone in their first three Premier Division seasons. In 1998–99, the club was eventually relegated to the Liga Indonesia First Division after finishing sixth (last) in the East Division.

Under chairman Zainal Abidin, Persiba went through four changes in leadership before finally winning promotion under Syahril HM Taher, who took charge in 2003. In 2004, the club returned to the Premier Division after finishing fourth in the regional 2 First Division.

Back in the top flight in 2005, Persiba showed immediate promise, finishing fifth in the East Division with 41 points from 26 matches — just two points behind Persebaya Surabaya, who qualified for the second round. In 2006, the club reached the second round after finishing fourth in the East Division, behind Persmin Minahasa, Persik Kediri, and PSM Makassar.

=== ISL era ===
In the Indonesia Super League (ISL) era, Persiba's performances were inconsistent. In their first ISL season, under coach Daniel Roekito, the club finished 12th with 45 points.

However, Persiba impressed in the 2009–10 season, with key players including I Made Wirawan, Mijo Dadic, Robertino Pugliara, Gendut Doni, and Julio Lopez. The team finished third, behind Arema Indonesia and Persipura Jayapura, and ahead of both Persib Bandung and Persija Jakarta. The other East Kalimantan clubs, Bontang FC and Persisam Putra Samarinda, finished outside the top ten. That season, Persiba also became the only team to defeat Arema in both home and away fixtures, and the only side to take three points at Kanjuruhan Stadium.

At the Inter Island Cup, a pre-season tournament for leading clubs, Persiba was the only representative from Kalimantan. In the 2010 edition, they defeated the reigning Piala Indonesia champions, Sriwijaya, by a large margin and advanced to the semi-finals. Despite these achievements, Persiba's form declined in subsequent seasons.

=== 2017: Financial problems and relegation to Liga 2 ===
Persiba's performances continued to fluctuate in the years that followed. By the inaugural Liga 1 season, the club — the oldest in East Kalimantan — was struggling financially, with funding heavily dependent on the club's owner and no significant sponsorship secured. The club's nomadic situation was made worse by the fact that Pertamina, the landowner of Persiba Stadium, had scheduled the site for redevelopment, while the replacement venue, Batakan Stadium, was still under construction.

As a temporary measure, Persiba relocated to Gajayana Stadium in Malang, East Java. However, the team failed to win a single home match there and returned to Parikesit after just four games, before eventually settling at Batakan Stadium. The season ended poorly, with only seven wins from 34 matches. Persiba finished second from bottom, alongside Semen Padang and Persegres Gresik United in the relegation zone.

The situation did not improve in Liga 2, where Persiba came close to a second successive relegation, finishing just one point above the drop zone in the East Region.

In November 2018, Syahril HM Taher was reappointed as chairman. He cleared hundreds of billions of rupiah in club debt and announced that Rp 5 billion in shares were available for new investors. Ownership was subsequently transferred back to the Balikpapan City Government, and Balikpapan Deputy Mayor Rahmad Mas'ud was announced as the new owner. Mas'ud set a clear target of returning Persiba to the top division. However, shortly before the new season began, he resigned from the role, citing complications in the ownership transfer process. Despite a personal appeal from Balikpapan Mayor Rizal Effendi to reconsider, Mas'ud's resignation stood.

=== 2019: New era under Gede Widiade ===
The new investor was Gede Widiade, former managing director of Persija Jakarta. His appointment was confirmed following a meeting between Mayor Rizal Effendi, Syahril HM Taher, and Widiade on Monday, 29 April 2019.

Widiade was a well-known figure in Indonesian football, having managed several clubs and led Persija to the 2018 Indonesia President's Cup and the 2018 Liga 1 title. His decision to join Persiba, rather than the similarly relegated Sriwijaya, was partly attributed to his personal relationship with former chairman Syahril. "I am grateful to the Mayor and to my elder, Mr. Syahril. I am not here as an investor, but as his son," Widiade said after the meeting.

With Liga 2 scheduled to begin on 15 June 2019, Widiade had fewer than two months to assemble a squad. Nevertheless, he expressed confidence in completing the mission of returning Persiba to the top flight. "I was asked to help bring Persiba back to where it belongs. God willing, I can fulfil that mandate," he added.

=== 2025: Return to Liga 2 from Liga Nusantara ===
On 27 February 2025, Persiba secured promotion to Liga 2 after defeating PSGC Ciamis 4–3 on penalties following a 2–2 draw, with both goals scored by Herman Dzumafo. The result ended the club's one-year absence from the second tier.

== Club rivalries ==
=== Derby Kaltim (until 2014) ===
Matches between Persiba Balikpapan and Persisam Putra Samarinda (now Bali United) were known as the "Derby Kaltim", widely regarded as the fiercest and most intense derby on the island of Kalimantan.

According to historical witness and match committee chairman Warsito, the rivalry between the two clubs dates back to the 1970s. "If we flash back to the 1970s, the dispute began between the players themselves — there were no supporters involved yet. Then, as fanaticism grew, it spread to the fans," Warsito explained. Over time, the hostility extended beyond the stadium, with no formal peace agreement reached for many years.

The derby was suspended after 2015, when Putra Samarinda was renamed Bali United and relocated its home base from Samarinda to Gianyar.

=== Derby Kaltim (continued) ===
The Derby Kaltim was revived through matches between Persiba Balikpapan and Borneo FC (formerly Pusamania Borneo), another club based in Samarinda. Borneo FC was promoted to the Indonesia Super League in 2015 following their Liga Indonesia Premier Division title the previous year.

=== Rivalry with Mitra Kukar ===
Mitra Kukar is also considered one of Persiba Balikpapan's main rivals.

== Stadium ==
=== Persiba Stadium (1986–2017) ===
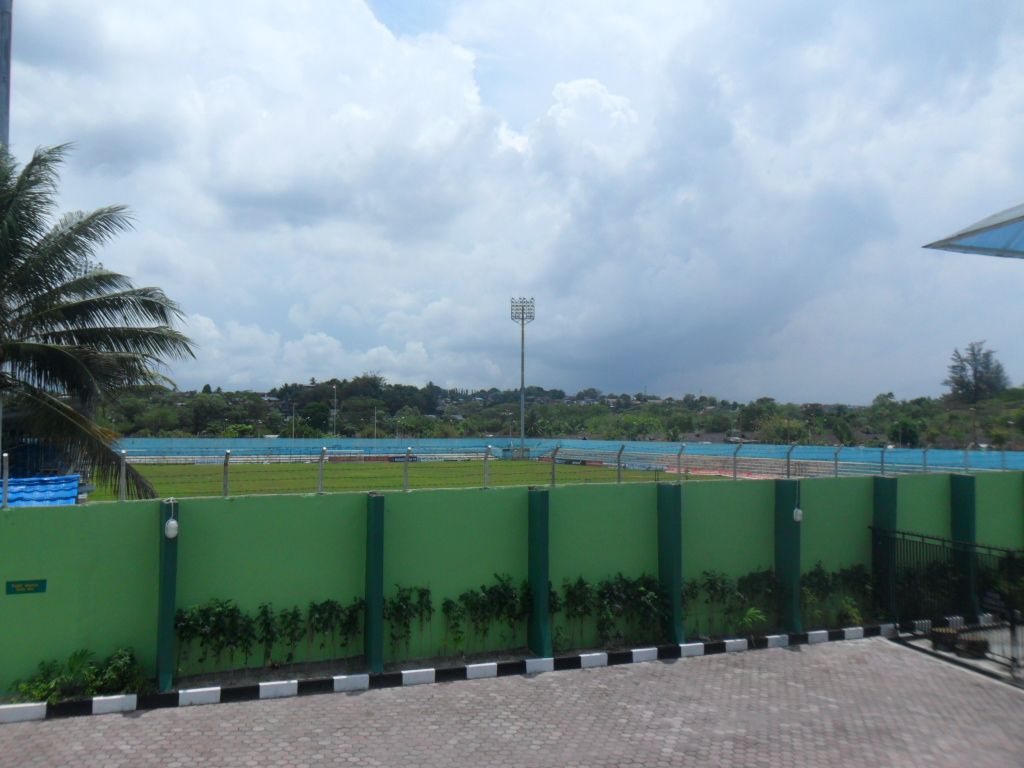
Persiba Stadium

At the start of the 2017 Liga 1 season, Persiba was forced to use Gajayana Stadium in Malang as their temporary home, as Pertamina — the landowner of Persiba Stadium — was proceeding with plans to demolish the site. The newly built replacement, Batakan Stadium, was not ready. Pertamina permitted Persiba to return to Persiba Stadium. Following further negotiations, the permit was extended until Batakan Stadium was ready and had passed verification. Persiba's final match at the stadium took place on 22 August 2017 against PS TNI, with the club winning 1–0 thanks to a last-minute header from Anmar Almubaraki. The stadium has since been taken over by PT Pertamina.

=== Batakan Stadium (2017–present) ===
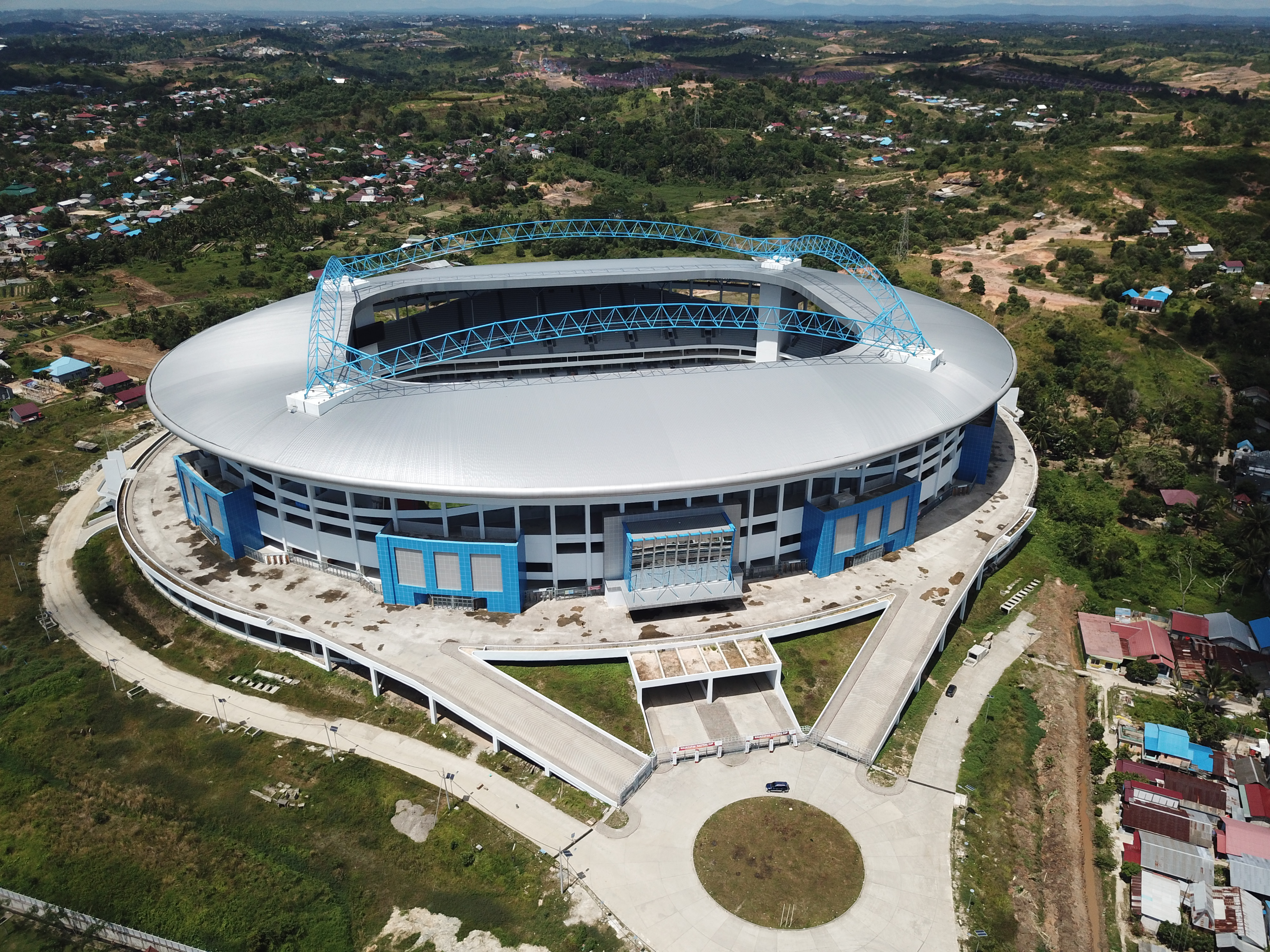
Aerial view of Batakan Stadium

Completed in August 2017, Batakan Stadium has a capacity of 40,000 and has been compared to the Emirates Stadium. Persiba first used the stadium on 9 September, in a 2017 Liga 1 fixture against Persegres Gresik United, winning 3–0.

== Coaching staff ==
Position	Name
Head coach	(Indonesia) Sudirman
Assistant coach	(Indonesia) Yus Arfandi (Indonesia) Gunawan Dwi Cahyo (Indonesia) Bayu Guntoro
Goalkeeper coach	(Indonesia) Deny Marsel
Fitness coach	(Indonesia)
Analysis	(Indonesia)

== Players ==
=== Current squad ===
As of September 2026

Note: Flags indicate national team as defined under FIFA eligibility rules; some limited exceptions apply. Players may hold more than one non-FIFA nationality.

No.	Pos.	Nation	Player
1	GK	IDN	Pancar Widiastono
4	DF	IDN	Muhammad Ilham
5	DF	IDN	Yudha Firdana
6	DF	JPN	Tomoki Taniguchi
7	DF	IDN	Abdul Rachman
8	MF	IDN	Bryan Cesar
9	FW	IDN	Prince Kallon
10	FW	JPN	Takumu Nishihara
11	MF	IDN	Rizal
13	GK	IDN	Risky Sudirman
14	MF	IDN	Fatihul Alif
16	MF	IDN	Fabio Royyan
17	DF	IDN	Ahmad Mujtaba (at Persebaya Surabaya)
18	FW	IDN	Andi Mukhram
19	MF	IDN	Ardi Ardiana

No.	Pos.	Nation	Player
20	DF	IDN	Cerilus Seran
23	MF	IDN	Yusran Al Makassar
24	DF	IDN	Valda Uzlah
27	DF	IDN	Meru Kimura (captain)
25	MF	IDN	Cois Artomoro
29	DF	IDN	Gardhika Arya
32	MF	IDN	Ilham Romadhona (at Persebaya Surabaya)
37	MF	IDN	Flavio Cameron
41	MF	JPN	Ryohei Yoshihama
66	FW	IDN	Jay Amru
67	MF	IDN	Akbar Hermawan
80	GK	IDN	Achmad Alfarizi
85	MF	IDN	Evan Anwar
91	FW	IDN	Arsa Ahmad

== Former coaches ==
Period	Coach
2004	(Indonesia) Gusnul Yakin
2005	(Indonesia) Jaya Hartono
2006	(Indonesia) Riono Asnan
2006	(Indonesia) Eddy Simon Badawi
2006–2008	(England) Peter Butler
2008–2010	(Indonesia) Daniel Roekito
2010	(Indonesia) Junaidi
2010–2012	(Indonesia) Haryadi
2012	(England) Peter Butler
2012	(Australia) Hans-Peter Schaller
2012–2013	(Indonesia) Herry Kiswanto
2013–2014	(Indonesia) Jaya Hartono
2014	(Indonesia) Liestiadi
2014–2015	(Indonesia) Eddy Simon Badawi
2015–2016	(Indonesia) Eduard Tjong

Period	Coach
2016	(Brazil) Jaino Matos
2017	(Germany) Timo Scheunemann
2017	(Bosnia and Herzegovina) Milomir Šešlija
2017	(Indonesia) Haryadi
2017–2018	(Brazil) Wanderley da Silva
2018	(Indonesia) Haryadi
2019	(Indonesia) Salahudin
2019	(Indonesia) Satia Bagdja
2020–2021	(Argentina) Alfredo Vera
2021	(Indonesia) Fakhri Husaini
2022–2023	(Indonesia) Ilham Romadhona
2023	(Indonesia) Nil Maizar
2023	(Indonesia) Zainal Abidin (caretaker)
2023–2024	(Indonesia) Rudy Eka Priyambada
2024–2025	(Indonesia) Amir Yusuf Pohan

== Kit suppliers and shirt sponsors ==
Period	Kit manufacturer	Shirt sponsor (chest)	Shirt sponsor (sleeve)	Shirt sponsor (back)
1980s–1994	Adidas	None	None	None
1994–1996	Adidas	Dunhill	None	None
1996–1997	Adidas	Kansas	None	None
1997–2008	Adidas	None	None	None
2008–2009	Adidas	Bankaltim	None	None
2009–2011	Reebok	Bankaltim	None	None
2011–2013	Specs	Bankaltim; Artha Reka Satria	None	None
2014	Injers	Bankaltim; Philips	None	PT. Anugerah Jaya Beton
2015	Eureka	Bankaltim; Philips	None	PT. Anugerah Jaya Beton
2016	Eureka	None	None	PT. Anugerah Jaya Beton
2017	MBB	Anugerah Group & Go-Jek	Cahaya Indonesia Wisata	None
2018	RIORS	Anugerah Group	Cahaya Indonesia Wisata	None
2019	MBB	PT. Cindara Pratama Lines; HBICS PT. BRM Pile, Go-pay	Permata Abadi Group	Bankaltimtara
2020	GW Apparel	Indika Energy	None	Pancoran Soccer Field
2021	GW Apparel	Indika Energy; Podiy Beauty Studio	NG Corporation	None
2022	GW Apparel	PSF Group	Herald Indonesia	None
2023	Equalnesia	PSF Group	Royal Suite Hotel	None
2023–2024	Equalnesia	Robot & Co	Royal Suite Hotel	None
2024–	Equalnesia	Cindara Pratama Group, MIP Poultry; Angel's Wing Indonesia PTMB	None	Bizhub 52X, Raja Lalapan

== Notable players ==
Local

- (Indonesia) Ponaryo Astaman (1997–1999)
- (Indonesia) Bima Sakti (2004–05), (2015–16)
- (Indonesia) Talaohu Musafri (2006–2009)
- (Indonesia) I Made Wirawan (2006–2012)
- (Indonesia) Sultan Samma (2006–2012)
- (Indonesia) Johan Yoga Utama (2009–10), (2012–13)
- (Indonesia) Gendut Doni Christiawan (2009–2010)
- (Indonesia) Hendro Siswanto (2009–2010)
- (Indonesia) Eddy Gunawan (2009–2011, 2020, 2022)
- (Indonesia) Dwi Joko (2009–2011)
- (Indonesia) Galih Sudaryono (2010–2011)
- (Indonesia) Asri Akbar (2010–2012)
- (Indonesia) Absor Fauzi (2010–2017)
- (Indonesia) Syakir Sulaiman (2012–2013)
- (Indonesia) Wawan Hendrawan (2012–2014)
- (Indonesia) Rendy Siregar (2013–2014)
- (Indonesia) Fengky Turnando (2013–2018)
- (Indonesia) Bryan Cesar (2015–2021)
- (Indonesia) Oktovianus Maniani (2016, 2020–2021)
- (Indonesia) Syamsir Alam (2016)
- (Indonesia) Kurniawan Ajie (2016–2017)
- (Indonesia) Hanif Sjahbandi (2016–2017)
- (Indonesia) Heri Susanto (2016–2017)

- (Indonesia) Alfath Fathier (2017)
- (Cameroon) (Indonesia) Herman Dzumafo (2024–2025)
- (Indonesia) I Gede Sukadana (2024–)
- (Indonesia) Ferdinand Sinaga (2024–2025)

Asia

- (Australia) Robert Gaspar (2006–2009)
- (Australia) Ryan Townsend (2007–2008)
- (Iraq) Anmar Almubaraki (2017)
- (Japan) Shohei Matsunaga (2011–12), (2016)
- (Japan) Kenji Adachihara (2011–2012)
- (Japan) Masahito Noto (2017)
- (Japan) Takumu Nishihara (2025–)
- (South Korea) Park Jung-hwan (2009–10)
- (South Korea) Kim Yong-hee (2010–2011)
- (South Korea) Kim Young-kwang (2013–2014)
- (Lebanon) Mahmoud El Ali (2013)
- (Lebanon) Mostafa El Qasaa (2013)
- (Philippines) Jason de Jong (2011)
- (Singapore) Khairul Amri (2010–2011)
- (Singapore) Precious Emuejeraye (2012–2013)
- (Indonesia) (Timor-Leste) Miro Baldo Bento (2007)

Africa

- (Cameroon) Patrice Nzekou (2012–13), (2014)
- (Ivory Coast) Franck Bezi (2012–2014)
- (Liberia) Boakay Eddie Foday (2016)

- (Liberia) Ansu Toure (2014–2015)
- (Liberia) Dirkir Glay (2016–2017)
- (Senegal) Pape N'Diaye (2014)
- (Sierra Leone) Brima Pepito (2008–2009)

America

- (Argentina) Adrian Trinidad (2006–07), (2009–10)
- (Argentina) Gaston Castaño (2008–2009)
- (Argentina) Robertino Pugliara (2009–2011)
- (Argentina) Fernando Soler (2013–2014)
- (Brazil) Bruno Zandonaide (2008–2009)
- (Brazil) Elisangelo de Jesus Jardim (2008–2009)
- (Brazil) Antônio Teles (2015–2016)
- (Brazil) Júnior Lopes (2017)
- (Brazil) Marlon da Silva (2017)
- (Brazil) Luiz Júnior (2023)
- (Chile) Julio Lopez (2009–2010)
- (Chile) Javier Roca (2007–2008)
- (Paraguay) Aldo Baretto (2010–2012)
- (Uruguay) Esteban Guillén (2012–2013)
- (Uruguay) Bryan Aldave (2014–2015)

Europe

- (Croatia) Mijo Dadić (2008–2011)
- (Croatia) Tomislav Labudović (2012–2013)
- (Serbia) Luka Savić (2012–2013)
- (Slovakia) Roman Golian (2015–2016)
- (Montenegro) Srđan Lopičić (2017)

== Statistics ==
=== Recent history ===
Note: Displaying from the 2008–09 season, when the Indonesia Super League was established.

Champions	Runners-up	Third place	Promoted	Relegated

Season	Division	Position	Pld	W	D	L	GF	GA	Pts	Cup	AFC competition(s)	
2008–09	SL	12th	34	13	7	14	40	42	46	Round of 16	–	–
2009–10	SL	3rd	34	15	9	10	44	31	54	First round	–	–
2010–11	SL	10th	28	9	7	12	41	44	34	–	–	–
2011–12	SL	7th	34	14	9	11	60	55	51	–	–	–
2013	SL	13th	34	10	10	14	42	48	40	–	–	–
2014	SL	5th (Note: East Region in First Round)	20	7	4	9	21	28	25	–	–	–
2015	SL	season not finished									–	–
2016	ISC-A	13th	34	9	8	17	38	52	35	–	–	–
2017	L1	17th	34	7	6	21	41	62	27	–	–	–
2018	L2	8th (Note: East Region in First Round)	22	8	3	11	36	34	27	Second round	–	–
2019	L2	8th (Note: East Region in First Round)	20	8	3	9	23	20	27	–	–	–
2020	L2	season declared void									–	–
2021–22	L2	4th (Note: Group X in Second Round)	13	4	3	6	11	14	15	–	–	–
2022–23	L2	season declared void									–	–
2023–24	L2	4th (Note: Group C in Relegation Round)	18	4	2	12	18	28	14	–	–	–
2024–25	LN	3rd (Note: Group Y in Promotion Round)	17	9	6	2	28	17	33	–	–	–
2025–26	CH	TBD	27	0	0	0	0	0	0	–	–	–
2026–27	CH	TBD	27	0	0	0	0	0	0	–	–	–

=== Season to season ===
Note: Since the Indonesia Super League (now Liga 1) launched in the 2008–09 season, the Liga Indonesia Premier Division (now Liga 2) became the second tier and the Liga Indonesia First Division (later replaced by Liga Nusantara) became the third tier.

Season	Tier	Division	Place	Piala Indonesia
1994–95	1	PD	15th (East Division)	–
1995–96	1	PD	14th (East Division)	–
1996–97	1	PD	9th (East Division)	–
1997–98	1	PD	10th (East Division)	–
1998–99	1	PD	6th (East Division)	–
1999–2000	2	FD	4th (Pro-PO)	–
2001	2	FD	4th (East Division)	–
2002	2	FD	5th (Group 4)	–
2003	2	FD	4th (Group D)	–
2004	2	FD	4th (East Division)	–
2005	1	PD	5th (East Division)	First round
2006	1	PD	4th (2R: Group A)	Second round
2007–08	1	PD	7th (East Division)	Second round

Season	Tier	Division	Place	Piala Indonesia
2008–09	1	SL	12th	Round of 16
2009–10	1	SL	3rd	First Round
2010–11	1	SL	10th	–
2011–12	1	SL	7th	–
2013	1	SL	13th	
2014	1	SL	5th (1R: East Division)	–
2015	1	SL	not finished	
2016	1	ISC-A	13th	
2017	1	L1	17th	–
2018	2	L2	8th (1R: East Region)	Second Round
2019	2	L2	8th (1R: East Region)	–
2020	2	L2	declared void	–
2021–22	2	L2	4th (2R: Group X)	–
2022–23	2	L2	not finished	–
2023–24	2	L2	4th (Rel-RD: Group C)	–
2024–25	3	LN	3rd	–
2025–26	2	L2		–

Current league

- 8 seasons in Liga 1
- 7 seasons in Liga 2
- 1 season in Liga Nusantara

Defunct league

- 8 seasons in Premier Division (as first tier)
- 5 seasons in First Division (as second tier)
- 1 season in ISC-A

== Honours ==
=== Domestic competitions ===
- Indonesia Super League
  - Third place (1): 2009–10
- Division I
  - Winners (1): 1985
- Division II
  - Winners (1): 1984
- Division III
  - Winners (1): 1983
- Liga Nusantara
  - Promotion play-off winner: 2024–25

=== Others ===
- Piala Walikota Padang
  - Runners-up (1): 2015
- Trofeo Battle of Borneo
  - Winners (1): 2018

== Asian clubs ranking ==
As of 5 May 2019

Current rank	Country	Club
198	(India)	Royal Wahingdoh
199	(United Arab Emirates)	Al Dhafra
200	(Indonesia)	Persiba Balikpapan
201	(Japan)	Oita Trinita
202	(Saudi Arabia)	Al-Nahda

== See also ==
- List of football clubs in Indonesia
