= Johan Bonilla =

Costa Rican footballer

Personal information
- Full name: Johan Josué Bonilla Calderón
- Date of birth: 30 May 1996 (age 30)
- Place of birth: San José, Costa Rica
- Height: 1.68 m (5 ft 6 in)
- Position: Attacking midfielder

Team information
- Current team: PSGC Ciamis
- Number: 57

Senior career*
Years	Team	Apps	(Gls)
2016	Uruguay	4	(0)
2016–2017	Belén	1	(0)
2018–2020	Walter Ferretti	33	(1)
2022	Jicaral	8	(0)
2022–2023	Municipal Grecia	32	(9)
2023–2024	Sporting San José	31	(0)
2024	Puntarenas	7	(0)
2025–2026	Gżira United	29	(5)
2026–	PSGC Ciamis	2	(0)
- * Club domestic league appearances and goals as of 19 September 2026

Johan Josué Bonilla Calderón (born 30 May 1996) is a Costa Rican professional footballer who plays as an attacking midfielder for Championship club PSGC Ciamis.

He previously played across various professional leagues in Central America and Europe before moving to Southeast Asia.

== Club career ==
Bonilla began his senior career in his native Costa Rica, turning professional with Uruguay in 2016. He went on to play for several Costa Rican top-flight teams, including Belén, Jicaral, Municipal Grecia, Sporting San José, and Puntarenas. He also had an overseas stint in Nicaragua with Walter Ferretti between 2018 and 2020, where he also made appearances in the CONCACAF League. In 2025, Bonilla moved to Europe to join Maltese Premier League side Gżira United, scoring 5 goals in 29 league matches.

On 18 August 2026, Bonilla officially signed with Indonesian side PSGC Ciamis ahead of the 2026–27 Championship campaign. On 12 September 2026, Bonilla made his league debut for PSGC Ciamis, starting in a 1–2 lost against Persikad Depok at the Pakansari Stadium.
