= Djakaridja Traoré =

Ivorian professional footballer

Personal information
- Full name: Djakaridja Gillardinho Junior Traoré
- Date of birth: 2 August 1998 (age 28)
- Place of birth: Abobo, Ivory Coast
- Height: 1.93 m (6 ft 4 in)
- Position: Forward

Team information
- Current team: Persiraja Banda Aceh
- Number: 9

Youth career
- 2016: RC Abidjan
- 2017–2018: Lille B

Senior career*
Years	Team	Apps	(Gls)
2019–2021	Rakovník	1	(0)
2020–2021	→ Hassania Agadir (loan)	3	(0)
2022–2023	TS Galaxy	18	(7)
2023–2025	İstanbulspor	16	(1)
2025	Železničar Pančevo	6	(0)
2025–2026	Real Kashmir	9	(3)
2026–	Persiraja Banda Aceh	4	(1)
- * Club domestic league appearances and goals as of 2 October 2026

Djakaridja Gillardinho Junior Traoré (born 2 August 1998) is an Ivorian professional footballer who plays as a forward for Championship club Persiraja Banda Aceh.

== Club career ==
=== Early career and Turkey ===
Traoré spent the early stages of his career playing in international leagues. On 8 August 2023, he signed a multi-year contract with Süper Lig club İstanbulspor. During his tenure with the Turkish club, he accumulated 16 official league appearances and scored one goal. His contract with İstanbulspor was mutually terminated on 2 December 2024 to facilitate a transfer abroad.

=== Serbia and India ===
In January 2025, Traoré moved to Serbia and completed a transfer to Serbian SuperLiga side Železničar Pančevo. He later shifted to India, joining I-League club Real Kashmir for the remainder of the season, where he scored three league goals.

=== Persiraja Banda Aceh ===
In August 2026, Traoré moved to Indonesia and signed with Persiraja Banda Aceh ahead of the 2026–27 Championship season. Persiraja head coach Jaya Hartono publicly stated that Traoré's composure in front of the goal and tall stature would make him a focal tactical anchor for the team's offensive crossing strategy. He made his league debut for Persiraja on 13 September 2026, in a 0–1 lose over Semen Padang at the H. Dimurthala Stadium. On 26 September 2026, Traoré scored his first goal from the penalty spot against Persikad Depok, a match that ended in a 2–1 lose.
