= Nilmaizar =

Indonesian footballer and manager (born 1970)

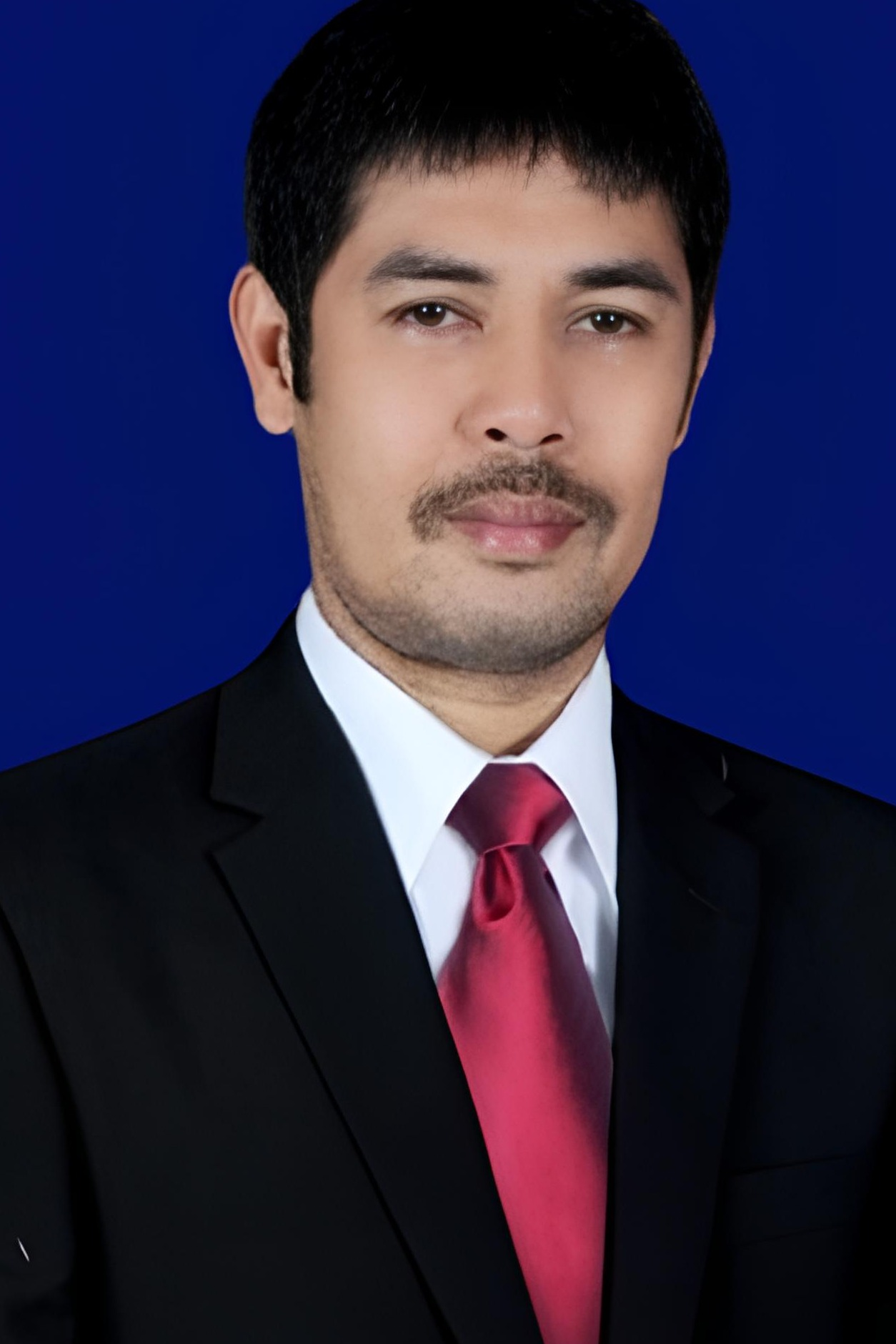

Personal information
- Date of birth: 2 January 1970 (age 56)
- Place of birth: Payakumbuh, West Sumatra, Indonesia
- Height: 1.70 m (5 ft 7 in)
- Position: Defender

Team information
- Current team: Semen Padang (head coach)

Youth career
- 1980–1986: Persepak Payukumbuh
- 1986–1987: Diklat Padang
- 1987–1988: Diklat Ragunan

Senior career*
Years	Team	Apps	(Gls)
1990–1992	Sparta Prague		
1992–1997	Semen Padang		
1997–1999	PSP Padang		

International career
1990–1991	Indonesia U-23		
1987–1991	Indonesia B		
1990–1994	Indonesia		

Managerial career
- 2000–2003: Semen Padang U-21
- 2005–2010: Semen Padang (assistant)
- 2010–2012: Semen Padang
- 2012–2013: Indonesia
- 2014–2015: Putra Samarinda F.C.
- 2015–2017: Semen Padang
- 2018: PS TIRA
- 2019–2021: Persela Lamongan
- 2021: Sriwijaya
- 2022: Dewa United
- 2024–2025: PSMS Medan
- 2025–2026: Sumsel United
- 2026–: Semen Padang
Political party	NasDem Party
- * Club domestic league appearances and goals

Nilmaizar (also written Nil Maizar; born 2 January 1970) is an Indonesian politician, former footballer and manager. He holds a Bachelor of Economics degree from Ekasakti University. He is the current head coach of Championship club Semen Padang.

== Playing career ==
He is a former Indonesia national football team player and defender who had trained with Sparta Prague in 1990.

== Coaching career ==
Nilmaizar was the head coach of Semen Padang's youth team and the assistant coach of the senior team for five years before being appointed as the head coach in 2010.

He led the club to reach fourth place in 2010–11 Indonesia Super League, though they performed as a promotion team, and led the team to gain their first title in 2011–12 Indonesian Premier League.

Following his success with the club, the Football Association of Indonesia employed Nilmaizar as a senior coach for the Indonesia national football team. He was sacked in March 2013.

On 25 May 2014, he was appointed as head coach by Putra Samarinda, replacing Mundari Karya. He was planned to coach Putra Samarinda for the 2015 Indonesia Super League, but after the club changed ownership and name, he was replaced by Indra Sjafri on 17 December 2014.

He was signed by Semen Padang on 25 January 2015 to replace Jafri Sastra as their head coach.

On 4 July 2018, he was appointed as head coach by PS TIRA, replacing Rudy Eka Priyambada.

Nilmaizar joined PSMS Medan for the 2024/2025 Liga 2 on 15 June 2024.

He was reappointed as head coach by Semen Padang for the 2026–27 Championship, following the club's relegation in the 2025–26 Super League.

== Honours ==
=== Player ===
Semen Padang

Winner

- Piala Galatama: 1992

=== Manager ===
Semen Padang

Winner

- Indonesian Premier League: 2011–12

== International matches ==
Win Draw Loss

Date	Location	Competition	Home team	Away team	Score
2012
3 May 2012	Palangkaraya	Exhibition game doesn't count as official match	PPSM Kartika Nusantara	Indonesia	0–8
11 May 2012	Bantul	Exhibition game doesn't count as official match	Persiba Bantul	Indonesia	1–1
17 May 2012	Nablus	2012 Palestine International Cup	Mauritania	Indonesia	0–2
19 May 2012	Hebron	2012 Palestine International Cup	Kurdistan Region	Indonesia	1–1
22 May 2012	Hebron	2012 Palestine International Cup	Palestine B	Indonesia	2–1
26 May 2012	Jakarta	Exhibition game doesn't count as official match	Indonesia	Inter Milan	2–4
5 June 2012	Manila	International Friendly	Philippines	Indonesia	2–2
4 August 2012	Jakarta	Exhibition game doesn't count as official match	Indonesia	Valencia	0–5
8 September 2012	Jakarta	International Friendly	Indonesia	North Korea	0–2
15 September 2012	Surabaya	International Friendly	Indonesia	Vietnam	0–0
26 September 2012	Bandar Seri Begawan	International Friendly	Brunei	Indonesia	5–0
26 September 2012	Hanoi	International Friendly	Vietnam	Indonesia	0–0
14 November	Jakarta	Exhibition game doesn't count as official match	Indonesia	Timor-Leste	1–0
17 November	Jakarta	Exhibition game doesn't count as official match	Indonesia	Cameroon B	0–0
25 November	Kuala Lumpur	2012 AFF Suzuki Cup	Indonesia	Laos	2–2
28 November	Kuala Lumpur	2012 AFF Suzuki Cup	Indonesia	Singapore	1–0
1 December	Kuala Lumpur	2012 AFF Suzuki Cup	Malaysia	Indonesia	0–2
2013
19 January	Medan	Exhibition game doesn't count as official match	Pro Duta FC	Indonesia	0–0
24 January	Lubuk Pakam	Exhibition game doesn't count as official match	Semen Padang	Indonesia	2–3
31 January	Amman	International Friendly	Jordan	Indonesia	5–0
6 February	Dubai	2015 AFC Asian Cup qualification	Iraq	Indonesia	1–0
