= Tomoki Taniguchi =

Japanese footballer

Personal information
- Full name: Tomoki Taniguchi
- Date of birth: October 22, 1992 (age 34)
- Place of birth: Kyoto, Japan
- Height: 1.85 m (6 ft 1 in)
- Positions: Centre back; defensive midfielder

Team information
- Current team: Persiba Balikpapan
- Number: 6

Youth career
- 2008–2010: Takigawa Daini High School
- 2011–2014: Ritsumeikan University

Senior career*
Years	Team	Apps	(Gls)
2015–2016	Nara Club	49	(3)
2017–2020	Azul Claro Numazu	77	(2)
2020–2021	Gainare Tottori	1	(0)
2021–2024	FC Osaka	43	(2)
2024–2025	Vonds Ichihara	33	(2)
2025–2026	National Defense Ministry	26	(1)
2026–	Persiba Balikpapan	1	(0)
- * Club domestic league appearances and goals as of 13 September 2026

Tomoki Taniguchi (谷口 智紀, Taniguchi Tomoki; born October 22, 1992) is a Japanese footballer who plays as a centre-back or defensive midfielder for Championship club Persiba Balikpapan.

== Career ==
Tomoki Taniguchi joined Japan Football League club Nara Club in 2015. In 2017, he moved to J3 League club Azul Claro Numazu.
