= Matheus Machado (footballer, born 1998) =

Brazilian footballer

Personal information
- Full name: Matheus Henrique Machado de Santana
- Date of birth: 28 August 1998 (age 28)
- Place of birth: Salvador, Bahia, Brazil
- Height: 1.75 m (5 ft 9 in)
- Position: Defensive midfielder

Team information
- Current team: PSPS Pekanbaru
- Number: 8

Youth career
- 2018–2019: Vitória B

Senior career*
Years	Team	Apps	(Gls)
2019–2020	Vitória	1	(0)
2020–2021	Jacuipense	3	(0)
2021–2022	→ Cianorte	0	(0)
2022	Cianorte	8	(0)
2022–2023	Nejmeh	9	(2)
2023	Comercial-SP	5	(0)
2023–2024	Figueirense	8	(0)
2024–2026	Persiraja Banda Aceh	20	(4)
2026–	PSPS Pekanbaru	1	(0)
- * Club domestic league appearances and goals as of 11 September 2026

Matheus Henrique Machado de Santana (born 28 August 1998) is a Brazilian professional footballer who plays as a defensive midfielder for Championship club PSPS Pekanbaru.

== Club career ==
Born in Salvador, Bahia, Brazil, Matheus is a youth product from Vitória. He made his first-team debut on 19 May 2019, in a 3–1 lose against São Bento In 2019 Campeonato Brasileiro Série B, but he mostly played in the U23 team.

In July 2020, he joined Jacuipense of Série C.

Ahead of 2022–23 season, he decided to go abroad for the first time to Lebanon with joined Nejmeh. He made his league debut for the club on 8 January 2023 as a starter in a 0–0 draw over Al Ahed. On 19 February 2023, he scored his first league goal for Nejmeh in a 1–1 draw over Al Ahed.

=== Figueirense ===
In December 2023, Matheus signed a contract with Figueirense. Matheus made his club debut on 22 April 2024, coming as a substitutes in a 2–1 home win against Ferroviário.

=== Persiraja Banda Aceh ===
On 16 December 2024, Indonesian Liga 2 side Persiraja Banda Aceh announced the signing of Matheus on a year deal. Four days later, Matheus made his league debut for Persiraja in a match against Persikota Tangerang, he give assists a goal by Miftahul Hamdi in a 6–2 win at H. Dimurthala Stadium.

On 5 January 2025, Matheus scored his first league goal for the team, opening the scoring in a 2–0 win over Dejan. He also earned man of the match in his second appearances. On 26 January 2025, Matheus scored the winning goal in a 2–3 away win over Deltras. He made seven league appearances for Persiraja, with four assists and two goals. On 20 June 2025, Matheus along with Miftahul Hamdi extended his contract with the club for one season.
