= Ryohei Yoshihama =

Japanese footballer

Ryohei Yoshihama 吉濱 遼平
Personal information
- Full name: Ryohei Yoshihama
- Date of birth: 24 October 1992 (age 34)
- Place of birth: Kawasaki, Kanagawa, Japan
- Height: 1.72 m (5 ft 7 1/2 in)
- Position: Attacking midfielder

Team information
- Current team: Persiba Balikpapan
- Number: 41

Youth career
- 1999–2004: Serie FC
- 2005–2008: Kawasaki Frontale
- 2009–2010: Daishi High School

College career
Years	Team	Apps	(Gls)
2011–2012	Shoin University		

Senior career*
Years	Team	Apps	(Gls)
2012–2014	Shonan Bellmare	10	(3)
2013	→ Fukushima United (loan)	22	(8)
2015–2016	Thespa Gunma	50	(7)
2017–2018	Machida Zelvia	47	(4)
2018–2019	Renofa Yamaguchi	45	(5)
2020–2021	FC Gifu	36	(1)
2023–2025	Boeung Ket	53	(21)
2025–2026	Hougang United	5	(0)
2026–	Persiba Balikpapan	1	(1)
- * Club domestic league appearances and goals as of 13 September 2026

Ryohei Yoshihama (吉濱 遼平, Yoshihama Ryōhei; born October 24, 1992) is a Japanese professional football player who plays as an attacking midfielder for Championship club Persiba Balikpapan.
