= Ladji Mallé =

Malian footballer (born 2001)

Personal information
- Full name: Ladji Mallé
- Date of birth: 12 November 2001 (age 24)
- Place of birth: Bamako, Mali
- Height: 1.82 m (6 ft 0 in)
- Position: Winger

Team information
- Current team: RANS Nusantara
- Number: 29

Youth career
- –2013: Leader Foot Académie
- 2013–2019: Right to Dream Academy

Senior career*
Years	Team	Apps	(Gls)
2019–2020	AS Bamako		
2021–2022	Pohronie	36	(2)
2022–2023	Las Vegas Lights FC	4	(0)
2023	Los Angeles FC 2	10	(2)
2023–2024	Al Arabi		
2024–2025	Gönyeli		
2025–2026	Hapoel Hadera	31	(5)
2026–	RANS Nusantara	1	(0)
- * Club domestic league appearances and goals as of 13 September 2026

Ladji Mallé (born 12 November 2001) is a Malian professional footballer who plays as a winger for Championship club RANS Nusantara.

== Personal life ==
He is a native speaker of Bambara and French. He is also fluent in English. He is one of eight siblings from the outskirts of Bamako. His two elder brothers are also professional footballers: Aly Mallé, currently plays for Şanlıurfaspor, and Amara Mallé, currently plays for AS Bamako and Mali international team.

== Career ==
=== FK Pohronie ===
Mallé was announced as a signing of Pohronie in February 2021 and he appeared in some winter preparatory friendly games, exhibiting technical skills in his appearances.

Mallé made his Fortuna liga debut against Nitra as a 60th-minute substitute. He appeared regularly in the following weeks as a substitute for Pohronie.
