= Phillerson =

Brazilian footballer (born 1998)

Personal information
- Full name: Phillerson Natan Silva de Oliveira
- Date of birth: 15 December 1998 (age 27)
- Place of birth: Guarulhos, Brazil
- Height: 1.75 m (5 ft 9 in)
- Position: Winger

Team information
- Current team: PSMS Medan
- Number: 10

Senior career*
| Years | Team | Apps | (Gls) |
| 2018–2019 | Itararé | 20 | (1) |
| 2020 | PTU Pathum Thani | 17 | (3) |
| 2020 | Trang | 16 | (0) |
| 2021–2023 | Nakhon Si United | 34 | (7) |
| 2023–2024 | Al Dhaid | 10 | (11) |
| 2024–2026 | Trat | 56 | (18) |
| 2026– | PSMS Medan | 6 | (4) |
- * Club domestic league appearances and goals as of 17 October 2026

Phillerson Natan Silva de Oliveira (born 15 December 1998), simply known as Phillerson, is a Brazilian professional footballer who plays as a winger for Championship club PSMS Medan.

== Career ==
Born in Guarulhos, Brazil, Phillerson started off senior career in the Brazilian club Itararé. In his first season in 2018, he appeared in 12 matches, and without scoring. And scoring one goal in 8 matches in 2019.

In 2020, Phillerson moved abroad for the first time in his career, signing a contract with Thai League 3 club PTU Pathum Thani. In July 2020, he transferred to Trang and played in the league’s Southern Region. After the first half of the season, he moved to league rivals Nakhon Si United in December 2020. In his first season with Nakhon Si United, he successfully guided his team to second place in the lower region at the end of the 2021–22 season. Then qualified for the promotion play-offs to the Thai League 2, finished third in the play-offs and were promoted to the second-tier.

He started his Thai League 2 match for Southern Dragons in a 3–2 away lose against Chiangmai United on 12 August 2022. On 10 September 2022, Phillerson scored his first league goal of the season with scored a brace for the club against Ranong United, with a 2–3 victory. In May 2023, he confirmed that he would not be extending his contract with the Southern Dragons for next season, during the 2022–23 season, he played in 28 matches and scored 5 goals.

At the end of July 2023, he moved to the United Arab Emirates, joining Al Dhaid. After a season with Al Dhaid, he returned to Thailand, signing a contract with Trat in July 2024. On 12 August 2024, he scored his first league goal in his debut match for Trat against Chanthaburi in a 1–0 win. On 22 September 2024, he scored the winning goal in a 1–2 away win over Suphanburi.

On 2 July 2026, Phillerson officially completed a transfer to Championship club PSMS Medan, marking his first venture into Indonesian football following his extensive career in Brazil, Thailand and the United Arab Emirates. On 13 September 2026, Phillerson scored his first goal from the penalty spot in his league debut against Sumsel United, a match that ended in a 2–2 draw. A week later, Phillerson scored a brace in PSMS's 6–0 home win against Persiku Kudus.
