= Willian Correia =

Brazilian footballer

Personal information
- Full name: Willian Correia Silva
- Date of birth: 10 February 1998 (age 28)
- Place of birth: Curitiba, Brazil
- Height: 1.94 m (6 ft 4 in)
- Position: Centre-back

Team information
- Current team: Persiku Kudus
- Number: 4

Youth career
- 2011–2016: Roma
- 2017–2018: Coritiba

Senior career*
Years	Team	Apps	(Gls)
2011	Roma	2	(0)
2019–2021	Londrina	8	(0)
2019	→ Foz do Iguaçu (loan)	4	(0)
2021–2023	Spartak Myjava	13	(1)
2023	RANS Nusantara	12	(0)
2023–2024	Kalteng Putra	13	(0)
2025	Tatran Prešov	3	(0)
2026–	Persiku Kudus	1	(0)
- * Club domestic league appearances and goals as of 20 September 2026

Willian Correia Silva (born 10 February 1998), or simply Willian, is a Brazilian professional footballer who plays as a centre-back for Championship club Persiku Kudus.

== Club career ==
=== Roma ===
Willian Correia made his league debut against Cianorte on 6 February 2011.

=== Londrina ===
Willian Correia made his league debut against Toledo on 29 January 2020.

=== Foz do Iguaçu ===
Willian Correia made his league debut against Brusque on 12 May 2019.

=== Spartak Myjava ===
In the 2022 season, he went abroad for the first time and signed a contract with 2. Liga side Spartak Myjava. Willian made his league debut on 15 July 2022 as a starter in a 1–0 win over ŠTK Šamorín. He scored his first league goal for Spartak Myjava in a 3–1 win over FK Dubnica on 12 August 2022.

=== RANS Nusantara ===
In January 2023, Willian decided to travel abroad to Asia and signed a contract with Indonesian Liga 1 club RANS Nusantara. Willian made his league debut on 21 January 2023 as a starter in a 2–0 lose over PSS Sleman.

=== Kalteng Putra ===
Willian signed for Kalteng Putra to play in Liga 2 in the 2023–24 season. Willian made his league debut for Kalteng Putra on 10 September 2023 as a starter in a 1–1 draw over Persipura Jayapura.
