= Jhon Mena =

Colombian footballer (born 1997)

Personal information
- Full name: Jhon Edy Mena Pérez
- Date of birth: 6 June 1997 (age 29)
- Place of birth: Quibdó, Colombia
- Height: 1.81 m (5 ft 11 in)
- Position: Winger

Team information
- Current team: Persikad Depok
- Number: 10

Youth career
- 2016–2018: Patriotas Boyacá

Senior career*
Years	Team	Apps	(Gls)
2018	Llaneros	11	(0)
2019	Huila	1	(0)
2021–2022	Renova	44	(1)
2022–2023	Makedonija GP	8	(1)
2023–2024	Fuglafjarðar	35	(7)
2024–2025	PSPS Pekanbaru	18	(6)
2025–2026	Persela Lamongan	19	(5)
2026–	Persikad Depok	4	(0)
- * Club domestic league appearances and goals as of 3 October 2026

Jhon Edy Mena Pérez (born 6 June 1997) is a Colombian professional footballer who plays as a winger for Championship club Persikad Depok.

== Club career ==
Born in Quibdó, Colombia, he joined several local Colombian clubs. And he decided to go abroad for the first time to North Macedonia and joined Macedonian First Football League side Renova in January 2021. He made his league debut for the club on 21 February 2021 as a substituted in a 2–4 home lose over Belasica. On 21 November 2021, Mena scored his first goal for Renova in a 1–4 away win against Borec Veres.

Since 2022, he joined Makedonija. In early February 2023, he joined Faroe Islands club Ítróttarfelag Fuglafjarðar, where he made 35 appearances and scored 7 goals.

=== PSPS Pekanbaru ===
In July 2024, Indonesian Liga 2 club PSPS Pekanbaru announced the signing of Mena on free transfer. On 7 September 2024, he scored his first league goal for the club in his debut match against Persikabo 1973 in a 3–1 win at the Kaharudin Nasution Rumbai Stadium. On 25 September 2024, he give two assists in a 4–6 away win over Persikota Tangerang. On 26 October 2024, he scored the opening goal in a 2–0 win over Sriwijaya. He contributed quite a lot to the team in the first round, Mena has appeared in 7 matches always playing 90 minutes, he has also contributed by scoring 2 goals and 3 assists.

On 20 January 2025, he scored the opening goal in the second half and give assists to Lerby Eliandry in a 2–0 win over Persiraja Banda Aceh. On 6 February 2025, Mena scored from a penalty kick in the 60th minute, he was sent off with a red card in the 94th minute against Deltras in a 2–0 victory. He will miss the next few games. His violent action against Deltras players and getting a red card, he received an additional 6 match sanction and he had to miss again in crucial matches against PSIM Yogyakarta and Persijap Jepara. As a result, his club failed to be promoted to Liga 1. He played for PSPS Pekanbaru for one season in Liga 2, making 18 appearances, scoring six goals and four assists.

=== Persela Lamongan ===
In July 2025, Mena was signed for Persela Lamongan to play in Championship in the 2025–26 season.

== Career statistics ==
=== Club ===
As of match played 25 April 2026

Club	Season	League			Cup		Continental		Other		Total	
Club	Season	Division	Apps	Goals	Apps	Goals	Apps	Goals	Apps	Goals	Apps	Goals
Llaneros	2018	Categoría Primera B	11	0	0	0	0	0	0	0	11	0
Atlético Huila	2019	Categoría Primera B	1	0	0	0	0	0		0	1	0
Renova	2020–21	Macedonian First Football League	12	0	0	0	–		0	0	12	0
Renova	2021–22	Macedonian First Football League	32	1	0	0	0	0	0	0	32	1
Makedonija	2022–23	Macedonian First Football League	8	1	0	0	2 (Note: Appearances in UEFA Europa Conference League qualifying)	0	0	0	10	1
Fuglafjarðar	2023	Faroe Islands Premier League	24	4	1 (Note: Appearances in Faroe Islands Cup)	0	–		0	0	25	4
Fuglafjarðar	2024	Faroe Islands Premier League	11	3	1 (Note: Appearances in Faroe Islands Cup)	0	0	0	0	0	12	3
PSPS Pekanbaru	2024–25	Liga 2	18	6	0	0	0	0		0	18	6
Persela Lamongan	2025–26	Championship	19	5	0	0	0	0		0	19	5
Career total			136	20	2	0	2	0	0	0	140	20
