= Murilo (footballer, born March 1995) =

Brazilian footballer

Personal information
- Full name: Murilo Otávio Mendes
- Date of birth: 8 March 1995 (age 31)
- Place of birth: Belo Horizonte, Brazil
- Height: 1.80 m (5 ft 11 in)
- Position: Forward

Team information
- Current team: Barito Putera
- Number: 31

Youth career
- 2011–2013: Grêmio Barueri
- 2013–2014: Olhanense

Senior career*
Years	Team	Apps	(Gls)
2013–2016	Olhanense	64	(12)
2016–2021	Livorno	136	(26)
2021–2022	Viterbese	43	(8)
2022–2023	Virtus Francavilla	29	(7)
2023–	Barito Putera	58	(11)
2026	→ Giugliano (loan)	9	(1)
- * Club domestic league appearances and goals as of 10 October 2026

Murilo Otávio Mendes (born 8 March 1995), simply known as Murilo, is a Brazilian professional footballer who plays as a forward for Championship club Barito Putera.

== Club career ==
On 8 January 2021, he signed a 3.5-year contract with Viterbese.

On 15 July 2022, Murilo moved to Virtus Francavilla.
