= 2025–26 Championship (Indonesia) =

Season of 2nd tier of football in Indonesia

Championship
- Season: 2025–26
- Dates: 12 September 2025 – 9 May 2026
- Champions: Garudayaksa; 1st Championship title 1st second-tier title
- Promoted: Garudayaksa; PSS; Adhyaksa Banten
- Relegated: Sriwijaya; Persipal; Persekat
- Matches: 273
- Goals: 730 (2.67 per match)
- Top goalscorer: Adilson Silva (26 goals)
- Biggest home win: Adhyaksa Banten 15–0 Sriwijaya (29 January 2026)
- Biggest away win: PSIS 0–5 PSS (19 October 2025); Sriwijaya 0–5 Sumsel United (24 January 2026); Persipal 0–5 Persipura (26 April 2026)
- Highest scoring: Adhyaksa Banten 15–0 Sriwijaya (29 January 2026)
- Longest winning run: 6 matches PSS
- Longest unbeaten run: 9 matches Barito Putera
- Longest winless run: 27 matches Persipal; Sriwijaya
- Longest losing run: 19 matches Sriwijaya
- Highest attendance: 35,335; Persipura 0–1 Adhyaksa Banten (8 May 2026)
- Lowest attendance: 40; Garudayaksa 2–1 Persekat (14 February 2026)
- Total attendance: 874,801
- Average attendance: 3,204

The 2025–26 Championship (also known as the 2025–26 Pegadaian Championship for sponsorship reasons) was the inaugural season of the Championship under its current name and the 16th season under its current league structure. The season began on 12 September 2025 and concluded on 9 May 2026, which includes a period of break from 1 to 19 December 2025 in conjunction with the recently concluded SEA Games in Thailand.

Garudayaksa won their first ever Championship title in the club history after defeating PSS in the final through the penalty shoot-out.

The summer transfer window opened on 24 June 2025 and closed on 11 September 2025, while the winter transfer window will run from 2 January to 28 February 2026.

This is the first full season where VAR technology is in use, following its introduction during the final and promotion play-off matches of the previous season.

== Overview ==
=== Promotion and relegation (pre-season) ===
20 teams will compete in the league – the fourteen teams from the previous season, three teams relegated from the Liga 1 and three teams promoted from Liga Nusantara.

==== Teams promoted to Super League ====
On 12 February 2025, Bhayangkara Presisi became the first team to secure promotion to Super League after a 0–0 draw against Persijap in matchweek 5 of Group Y in the championship round, ensuring an immediate return to the top tier.

PSIM became the second team to gain promotion on 17 February 2025 after defeating PSPS in matchweek 6 of Group X. The result ended PSIM's 18-season stay in the second tier since the inception of the Indonesian Super League (now Super League) in the 2008–09 season.

Persijap secured the final promotion spot on 25 February 2025 after defeating PSPS in the promotion play-off. The win ended Persijap's 10-seasons absence from the top tier. During that period, they spent eight seasons in the second tier and two in the third tier.

==== Teams relegated from Liga 1 ====
PSIS became the first team to be relegated on 11 May 2025 after Semen Padang draw with Persebaya in an away match during matchweek 32. PSIS return to second tier after spending seven seasons at top tier.

Semen Padang's victory over Arema in an away match on final matchweek resulted in both PSS and Barito Putera being relegated on 24 May 2025. PSS returned to the second tier after spending six seasons in the top tier and Barito Putera returned to the second tier after spending eleven seasons in the top tier.

==== Teams promoted from Liga Nusantara ====
On 17 February 2025, Kendal Tornado (formerly Tornado Pekanbaru) became the first team to secure promotion to Championship after defeating PSGC in matchweek 5 of Group X in the championship round. The 2024–25 season marked Tornado's debut in the second tier of the Indonesian league system.

Persikad Depok (formerly Sumut United) and Persiba Balikpapan also earned promotion, both returning to Championship after a one-season absence. Persikad sealed promotion on 23 February 2025 with a 5–1 away win over NZR Sumbersari in matchweek 6 of Group Y. Persiba secured the final promotion spot on 27 February 2025 after defeating PSGC in a penalty shootout in the promotion play-off.

==== Teams relegated to Liga Nusantara ====
The first three teams to be relegated were Nusantara United, Persikabo 1973, and Persikota, following the results of their respective matches on 10 February 2025. Nusantara United and Persikota drew their games, but the results were insufficient to avoid relegation. On the same day, Sriwijaya secured a win over PSMS in matchweek 5 of Group H in the relegation round.

Nusantara United were relegated to the third tier after three seasons in the second tier. Persikota also returned to the third tier just one season after gaining promotion. Persikabo 1973 suffered a second consecutive relegation, having failed to retain their place in the second tier after losing to Adhyaksa Banten in matchweek 5 of Group I.

RANS Nusantara became the fourth team to be relegated on 13 February 2025 after a loss to Persipal in matchweek 6 of Group K, marking their second straight relegation after just one season in the second tier.

Persewar, after spending six seasons in the second tier, along with Persipa and Gresik United, each after three seasons, were also relegated. Persewar were relegated on 16 February 2025 after a defeat in matchweek 8 of Group J. Persipa followed on 21 February 2025 after Persipura defeated RANS Nusantara in matchweek 9 of Group K. Gresik United were relegated on 25 February 2025 after Persibo won against Persewar in matchweek 10 of Group J.

Meanwhile, Dejan and Persibo also returned to the third tier just one season after gaining promotion. Dejan were relegated on 15 February 2025 following a defeat to Adhyaksa Banten in matchweek 6 of Group I, while Persibo were relegated on 28 February 2025 after losing to Persipura in a single-match relegation play-off.

=== Name changes and relocated teams ===
- Adhyaksa changed their official name to Adhyaksa Banten and moved to Banten International Stadium in Serang starting from this season.
- Tornado Pekanbaru changed their official name to Kendal Tornado and moved to Kebondalem Stadium in Kendal starting from this season.
- Persikas sold their Championship playing license to Sumsel United, who will play at Palembang starting from this season.
- PSKC changed their official name to Garudayaksa and moved to Bekasi Regency starting from this season.
- Sumut United was acquired by Liga 4 side, Persikad 1999. As a result, Persikad 1999 took over Sumut United's place in Championship starting from this season and they will compete under name Persikad Depok.

== Teams ==
=== Teams changes ===
The following teams changed division since the 2024–25 season.

To Championship
▼ Relegated from Liga 1
- PSS
- Barito Putera
- PSIS
▲ Promoted from Liga Nusantara
- Persikad
  (previously Sumut United)
- Kendal Tornado
- Persiba

From Liga 2
▲ Promoted to Super League
- PSIM
- Bhayangkara Presisi
- Persijap
▼ Relegated to Liga Nusantara
- Dejan
- Gresik United
- Nusantara United
- Persewar
- Persibo
- Persikabo 1973
- Persikota
- Persipa
- RANS Nusantara

=== Teams by province ===
Rank	Province	Number	Teams
1	Central Java	4	Kendal Tornado, Persekat, Persiku and PSIS
2	West Java	3	Bekasi City, Garudayaksa, and Persikad
3	East Java	2	Deltras and Persela
3	South Sumatra	2	Sriwijaya and Sumsel United
5	Aceh	1	Persiraja
5	Banten	1	Adhyaksa Banten
5	Central Sulawesi	1	Persipal
5	East Kalimantan	1	Persiba
5	North Sumatra	1	PSMS
5	(Papua (province)) Papua	1	Persipura
5	Riau	1	PSPS
5	South Kalimantan	1	Barito Putera
5	(Special Region of Yogyakarta) Yogyakarta	1	PSS

=== Locations and stadiums ===
Locations of teams in the 2025–26 Championship.
Red: Group 1; Blue: Group 2
Locations of teams in the 2025–26 Championship from Java region.
Red: Group 1; Blue: Group 2

Team	Location	Stadium	Capacity	2024–25 season
Adhyaksa Banten	Serang	Banten International	30,000	1st in RL Group I
Barito Putera^{↓}	Banjarmasin	Demang Lehman, at Banjarbaru (Note: Due to the ongoing renovation of 17th May Stadium, Barito Putera will play their home matches at Demang Lehman Stadium in Banjarbaru.)	7,200	17th in Liga 1
Bekasi City	Bekasi City	Patriot Candrabhaga	30,000	2nd in RL Group I
Deltras	Sidoarjo	Gelora Delta	19,000	4th in CH Group X
Garudayaksa	Bekasi Regency	Pakansari, at Bogor (Note: Due to the ongoing renovation of Wibawa Mukti Stadium, Garudayaksa will play their home matches at Pakansari Stadium in Bogor.)	30,000	3rd in CH Group Y
Kendal Tornado^{↑}	Kendal (Note: Due to the ongoing renovation of Kebondalem Stadium, Kendal Tornado will play their home matches at Jatidiri Stadium in Semarang for the first half of the season and at Sriwedari Stadium in Surakarta for the second half of the season.)	Jatidiri, at Semarang	18,000	Liga Nusantara Runner-up
Kendal Tornado^{↑}	Kendal	Sriwedari, at Surakarta	23,000	Liga Nusantara Runner-up
Persekat	Tegal	Tri Sanja	10,000	2nd in RL Group J
Persela	Lamongan	Surajaya	12,097	4th in CH Group Y
Persiba^{↑}	Balikpapan	Batakan	40,000	Promotion play-off winner
Persikad^{↑}	Depok	Pakansari, at Bogor (Note: Due to Merpati Stadium not meeting the league requirements, Persikad will play their home matches at Pakansari Stadium in Bogor.)	30,000	Liga Nusantara Champion
Persiku	Kudus	Wergu Wetan (Note: Due to Wergu Wetan Stadium not eligible to host matches during nighttime, Persiku will play their home matches during Ramadan at Sriwedari Stadium in Surakarta.)	15,000	1st in RL Group J
Persipal	Palu	Gawalise (Note: Due to Gawalise Stadium not eligible to host matches during nighttime, Persipal will play their home matches during Ramadan at Sriwedari Stadium in Surakarta.)	20,000	2nd in RL Group K
Persipura	Jayapura	Lukas Enembe (Note: Due to the ongoing renovation of Mandala Stadium, Persipura will play their home matches at Lukas Enembe Stadium in Jayapura.)	40,263	Relegation play-off winner
Persiraja	Banda Aceh	H. Dimurthala	8,000	3rd in CH Group X
Persiraja	Banda Aceh	Harapan Bangsa	13,000	3rd in CH Group X
PSIS^{↓}	Semarang	Jatidiri	18,000	18th in Liga 1
PSMS	Medan	North Sumatra Main, at Deli Serdang (Note: Due to the ongoing renovation of Teladan Stadium, PSMS will play their home matches at North Sumatra Main Stadium in Deli Serdang.)	26,000	1st in RL Group H
PSPS	Pekanbaru	Kaharudin Nasution	25,000	4th in Liga 2
PSS^{↓}	Sleman	Maguwoharjo	20,594	16th in Liga 1
Sriwijaya	Palembang	Gelora Sriwijaya	23,000	2nd in RL Group H
Sumsel United	Palembang	Gelora Sriwijaya	23,000	1st in RL Group K

^{↓}	Relegated from the Super League
^{↑}	Promoted from the Liga Nusantara

League notes:
- CH: Championship round
- RL: Relegation round
Location notes:

=== Personnel and kits ===
Note: Flags indicate national team as has been defined under FIFA eligibility rules. Players and coaches may hold more than one non-FIFA nationality.

Team	Head coach	Captain	Kit manufacturer	Kit sponsors	
Team	Head coach	Captain	Kit manufacturer	Main	Other(s)
Adhyaksa Banten	(Indonesia national football team) Ade Suhendra	(Indonesia national football team) Ardi Ramdani	(Indonesia) PGRPN	Farmel	List: Front: Banten Punya Nyali, Banten Juara, Bank Mandiri, Adhyaksa, Pakar IPAL Indonesia; Back: Jawara Mania; Sleeves: Bank BJB; Shorts: None
Barito Putera	(Indonesia national football team) Stefano Cugurra	(Indonesia national football team) Rizky Pora	(Indonesia) H^{2}	Hasnur Group	List: Front: TCT, Jhonlin Group; Back: Bank Kalsel; Sleeves: None; Shorts: None
Bekasi City	(Indonesia national football team) Widyantoro	(Indonesia national football team) Dias Angga Putra	(Indonesia) Calma	PStore	List: Front: None; Back: None; Sleeves: Air Alam; Shorts: None
Deltras	(Indonesia national football team) Widodo C. Putro	(Indonesia national football team) Hariono	(Indonesia) Lekaw	Kapal Api	List: Front: Sumber Urip Sejati; Back: Sarung Al Hijaz; Sleeves: None; Shorts: None
Garudayaksa	(Indonesia national football team) Doel Khamid	(Indonesia national football team) Asep Berlian	(Indonesia) DRX	DRX Token	List: Front: None; Back: LXVR, DNA Sport; Sleeves: None; Shorts: None
Kendal Tornado	(Indonesia national football team) Stefan Keeltjes	(Indonesia national football team) Dimas Sukarno	(Indonesia) Calma	Charlie Hospital	List: Front: BRI, U2 PLAY; Back: Charlie Sport Center (H) / Charlie Konstruksi (A); Sleeves: None; Shorts: None
Persekat	(Indonesia national football team) I Putu Gede	(Indonesia national football team) Muhammad Taufiq	(Indonesia) Orlin	Ersal Aburizal	List: Front: Tegal Road Construction, Garasi Asatu, MerahPutih Advertising, PT Harbas; Back: Sentosa Beton Perkasa, RSUD dr. Soeselo Slawi; Sleeves: Bhamada University; Shorts: None
Persela	(Indonesia national football team) Bima Sakti	(Indonesia national football team) Beto Gonçalves	(Indonesia) Etams	Duta Merpati^{5}	List: Front: DR. HOUZ^{5}, Permata Land^{5}, Altop Group^{5}, Universitas Sunan Gresik^{5}, Greda^{5}; Back: Ababil Group^{5}; Sleeves: M-Truss^{5}; Shorts: None
Persiba	(Indonesia national football team) Leonard Tupamahu	(Indonesia national football team) Abdul Rachman	(Indonesia) Arche	Wealth Crypto^{7}	List: Front: None; Back: None; Sleeves: None; Shorts: None
Persikad	(Indonesia national football team) Achmad Zulkifli	(Indonesia national football team) Luthfi Kamal	(Indonesia) Ereight	Bank Syariah Nasional^{3}	List: Front: None; Back: None; Sleeves: Bank Syariah Nasional^{3}; Shorts: None
Persiku	(Indonesia national football team) Bambang Pujo Sumantri	(Brazil national football team) Igor Henrique	(Indonesia) Total Sportswear	Indomaret	List: Front: Poltekun, Pertamina; Back: PLN; Sleeves: None; Shorts: None
Persipal	(Indonesia national football team) Kamaluddin	(Indonesia national football team) Rendy Saputra	(Indonesia) Bam Sportswear	CPM^{6}	List: Front: Poso Energy, Mitra Orphys, Bank Sulteng; Back: None; Sleeves: Baruga Group; Shorts: None
Persipura	(Indonesia national football team) Rahmad Darmawan	(Indonesia national football team) Ramai Rumakiek	(Indonesia) Cendrawasih Karsa^{2}	Kapal Api	List: Front: Bank Papua; Back: Ulam Laut; Sleeves: ELPI; Shorts: None
Persiraja	(Indonesia national football team) Jaya Hartono	(Indonesia national football team) Fitra Ridwan	(Indonesia) Trops	Bank Syariah Nasional^{3}	List: Front: Mifa Bersaudara, PT MCDO, PEMA, Pupuk Indonesia^{4}, Dek Gam Foundation; Back: Moya, PDAM Tirta Daroy; Sleeves: Kyriad Muraya Hotel, Parkside Alhambra Hotel; Shorts: None
PSIS	(Indonesia national football team) Kas Hartadi	(Indonesia national football team) Otávio Dutra	(Indonesia) Ereight	Indomie	List: Front: PStore, nexa, Lyly Bakery, Cordova Edupartment, Belikopi; Back: Yamaha Mataram Sakti, Belikopi+; Sleeves: ChickRizz, Super Smart Suplemen; Shorts: None
PSMS	(Indonesia national football team) Eko Purdjianto	(South Korea national football team) Kim Jeung-ho	(Indonesia) DRX	new SUMUT.mobile	List: Front: None; Back: None; Sleeves: None; Shorts: None
PSPS	(Indonesia national football team) Aji Santoso	(Indonesia national football team) Alfin Tuasalamony	(Indonesia) Curva Sport	PSF Group	List: Front: Riau Petroleum, RS Awal Bros; Back: Pusat Grosir Metro Tanah Abang; Sleeves: None; Shorts: None
PSS	(Indonesia national football team) Ansyari Lubis	(Brazil national football team) Cleberson	(Indonesia) Scorelab^{2}	Amman Mineral	List: Front: KFC, Indomie, MedcoEnergi, Ithaca Resources; Back: Nestlé Pure Life, Bakso KampungQu; Sleeves: Curva Sud Shop; Shorts: None
Sriwijaya	(Indonesia national football team) Budi Sudarsono	(Indonesia national football team) Ganjar Mukti	(Indonesia) Ereight	Digi Sport Asia	List: Front: Cimory; Back: None; Sleeves: None; Shorts: None
Sumsel United	(Indonesia national football team) Nil Maizar	(Indonesia national football team) Rachmad Hidayat	(Indonesia) XTen	Bank Sumsel Babel	List: Front: Semen Baturaja, Pupuk Sriwidjaja, Golden Great Borneo, TEL, Triaryani, PT Ayik Batu Gung, Titan Infra Energy, Bukit Asam; Back: Priamanaya Group, Bara Coal; Sleeves: None; Shorts: None

1. Caretaker.
2. Apparel made by club.
3. Previously known as BTN Syariah until October 2nd when they merged with Bank Victoria Syariah.
4. Persiraja advertised different products of Pupuk Indonesia on their kits, which include Nitrea (matchweek 1–4) and Pupuk NPK Phonska Plus 15-15-15 (matchweek 5 onwards).
5. Persela were sponsored by Belikopi (front), Lyly Bakery and Belikopi+ (back) in the first half of the season.
6. Persipal were sponsored by SK Premiere in the first half of the season.
7. Persiba were without a sponsor until matchweek 23.

=== Coaching changes ===
==== Pre-season ====
Team	Outgoing head coach	Manner	Date of vacancy	Replaced by	Date of arrival
Deltras	(Indonesia) Bejo Sugiantoro	Died	25 February 2025	(Indonesia) Widodo C. Putro	2 June 2025
Persela	(Indonesia) Zulkifli Syukur	End of contract	1 March 2025	(Indonesia) Aji Santoso	18 April 2025
PSMS	(Indonesia) Nil Maizar	End of contract	1 March 2025	(Indonesia) Kas Hartadi	31 July 2025
PSPS	(Indonesia) Aji Santoso	End of contract	1 March 2025	(Indonesia) Ilham Romadhona	17 June 2025
Kendal Tornado	(Indonesia) I Wayan Sukadana	End of contract	1 March 2025	(Indonesia) Stefan Keeltjes	22 May 2025
Persipal	(Indonesia) Achmad Zulkifli	End of contract	1 March 2025	(Indonesia) Delfi Adri	2 August 2025
Sriwijaya	(Indonesia) Hendri Susilo	End of contract	1 March 2025	(Indonesia) Achmad Zulkifli	20 June 2025
PSIS	(Indonesia) Muhammad Ridwan	End of caretaker role	24 May 2025	(Indonesia) Kahudi Wahyu	30 June 2025
Barito Putera	(Brazil) Vitor Tinoco	End of contract	24 May 2025	(Indonesia) Stefano Cugurra	2 June 2025
PSS	(Netherlands) Pieter Huistra	Became coach consultant	24 May 2025	(Indonesia) Ansyari Lubis	2 July 2025
Garudayaksa	(Indonesia) Kas Hartadi	Change in ownership	4 June 2025	(Indonesia) Doel Khamid	23 August 2025
Sumsel United	(Indonesia) Didin Gultom	Change in ownership	4 June 2025	(Indonesia) Nil Maizar	13 June 2025

==== During the season ====
Team	Outgoing head coach	Manner	Date of vacancy	Week	Position in table		Replaced by	Date of appointment
Team	Outgoing head coach	Manner	Date of vacancy	Week	Group	Position	Replaced by	Date of appointment
PSPS	(Indonesia) Ilham Romadhona	Sacked	30 September 2025	3	1	9th	(Indonesia) Aji Santoso	13 October 2025
PSIS	(Indonesia) Kahudi Wahyu	Sacked	30 September 2025	3	2	10th	(Indonesia) Ega Raka Ghalih (caretaker)	30 September 2025
Persela	(Indonesia) Aji Santoso	Sacked	8 October 2025	4	2	7th	(Indonesia) Ragil Sudirman (caretaker)	8 October 2025
PSIS	(Indonesia) Ega Raka Ghalih	End of caretaker role	2 November 2025	8	2	10th	(Indonesia) Ega Raka Ghalih	2 November 2025
PSIS	(Indonesia) Ega Raka Ghalih	Sacked	19 November 2025	11	2	10th	(Indonesia) Jafri Sastra	21 November 2025
Persela	(Indonesia) Ragil Sudirman	End of caretaker role	30 December 2025	13	2	5th	(Indonesia) Bima Sakti	30 December 2025
PSMS	(Indonesia) Kas Hartadi	Sacked	7 January 2026	14	1	7th	(Indonesia) Eko Purdjianto	7 January 2026
Persiba	(Indonesia national football team) Mohammad Nasuha	Sacked	13 January 2026	15	2	7th	(Indonesia) Leonard Tupamahu	14 January 2026
PSIS	(Indonesia) Jafri Sastra	Sacked	31 January 2026	18	2	9th	(Indonesia) Andri Ramawi Putra	14 February 2026
Persiraja	(Indonesia national football team) Akhyar Ilyas	Mutual consent	3 February 2026	19	1	5th	(Indonesia) Jaya Hartono	3 February 2026
PSIS	(Indonesia) Andri Ramawi Putra	Resigned	15 April 2026	24	2	8th	(Indonesia) Anang Dwita (caretaker)	15 April 2026
PSIS	(Indonesia) Anang Dwita (caretaker)	End of caretaker role	21 April 2026	25	2	8th	(Indonesia) Kas Hartadi	21 April 2026

== Foreign players ==
- Players named in **bold** indicates the player was registered during the mid-season transfer window.
- Former players named in italics are players that were out of squad or left the club within the season, after the pre-season transfer window, or in the mid-season transfer window, and at least had one appearance.

Team	Player 1	Player 2	Player 3	Former players
Adhyaksa Banten	(Argentina) **Ramiro Fergonzi**	(Mali) Makan Konaté	(Portugal) Adilson Silva	(United States) Jonny Campbell
Barito Putera	(Brazil) Alexsandro	(Brazil) Renan Alves	(Saint Vincent and the Grenadines) **Cornelius Stewart**	(Nicaragua) Jaime Moreno
Bekasi City	(Brazil) Renan Silva	(Chad) Ezechiel N'Douassel	(Ukraine) Mykhaylo Kaluhin	
Deltras	(Brazil) Rian Lopes	(Cameroon) Neville Tengeg	(Japan) **Yuki Takatoku**	(Turkey) Göktuğ Demiroğlu
Garudayaksa	(Brazil) Everton	(Czech Republic) **Christián Frýdek**	(Lithuania) **Vytas Gašpuitis**	(Chile) **Vicente Concha** (South Korea) **Ryu Seung-woo**
Kendal Tornado	(Brazil) Felipe Ryan	(Brazil) Patrick Cruz	(Colombia) Juan Pablo Morales	
Persekat	(Brazil) Iuri	(France) **Sylvain Atieda**	(Portugal) **Pedro Matos**	(Brazil) Kaio Lucas (Brazil) Marcus Vinicius
Persela	(Brazil) Daniel Gonçalves	(Brazil) **Luan Sérgio**	(Colombia) Jhon Mena	(Argentina) Jonathan Bustos
Persiba	(Japan) Kodai Nagashima	(Japan) Takumu Nishihara		(Uzbekistan) Shokhrukhbek Kholmatov
Persikad	(Algeria) Riad Belhadj	(Brazil) **Rosalvo**	(Portugal) **Adriano Castanheira**	(France) Enzo Célestine (Uzbekistan) Kamron Saydazimov
Persiku	(Brazil) Igor Henrique	(Brazil) **Caíque Souza**	(Brazil) **Jaime**	(Japan) Noriki Akada (Serbia) Ivan Marić
Persipal	(Australia) **Nathan Hancock**	(Japan) **Kenzo Nambu**	(Japan) **Riku Ichimura**	(Ghana) Daniel Adade (Timor-Leste) Claudio Osorio
Persipura	(Brazil) Artur Vieira	(United States) **Victor Mansaray**	(Venezuela) **Williams Lugo**	(Brazil) Matheus Silva (Japan) Takuya Matsunaga
Persiraja	(Afghanistan) **Omid Popalzay**	(Scotland) Connor Flynn-Gillespie	(Spain) **Juan Mera**	(Brazil) Matheus Machado (England) Zac Tyson
PSIS	(Brazil) **Denilson**	(Brazil) **Rafinha**	(Colombia) **Aldair Simanca**	(Brazil) Luan Sérgio (Colombia) Camilo Sánchez (Montenegro) Marko Ivanovic
PSMS	(Argentina) Felipe Cadenazzi	(Brazil) **Clayton**	(South Korea) Kim Jeung-ho	(Portugal) Vítor Barata
PSPS	(Brazil) **Antônio Gamaroni**	(Brazil) **Douglas Cruz**	(Ghana) **Francis Yaghr**	(Brazil) Cristian Alex (Brazil) Jeferson Sousa (Uzbekistan) Jakhongir Kurbonboev
PSS	(Brazil) Gustavo Tocantins	(Brazil) **Lucão**	(France) Frédéric Injaï	(Brazil) Cleberson
Sriwijaya	(England) **Zac Tyson**			
Sumsel United	(Brazil) Diego Dall’Oca	(Brazil) Fernando Barbosa	(Brazil) Juninho Cabral	

== League table ==
A total of 20 teams will be divided into 2 groups based on the geographical location of their homebase. Each group consists of 10 teams, with each team playing against the other teams in their group three times in a triple round-robin format.

The first-place teams from the group 1 and 2 will be advance to the final and directly promoted to 2026–27 Super League, while the runners-up will play a promotion play-off for the remaining promotion spot. The 10th-place teams from each group will be relegated to 2026–27 Liga Nusantara, and the 9th-place teams will face off in a relegation play-off to decide one additional relegated team.

=== Group 1 ===
Pos	Team	Pld	W	D	L	GF	GA	GD	Pts	Promotion, qualification or relegation
1	Garudayaksa (C, P)	27	14	10	3	49	19	+30	52	Promotion to the 2026–27 Super League and qualification for the final
2	Adhyaksa Banten (O, P)	27	14	9	4	60	31	+29	51	Qualification for the promotion play-off
3	Bekasi City	27	12	8	7	45	29	+16	44	
4	Sumsel United	27	12	6	9	40	33	+7	42	
5	Persiraja	27	10	10	7	42	32	+10	40	
6	PSPS	27	9	10	8	50	45	+5	37	
7	PSMS	27	9	9	9	33	31	+2	36	
8	Persikad	27	9	7	11	39	45	−6	34	
9	Persekat (R)	27	6	9	12	22	37	−15	27	Qualification for the relegation play-off
10	Sriwijaya (R)	27	0	2	25	15	93	−78	2	Relegation to the 2026–27 Liga Nusantara

Source: Championship 2025–26
Rules for classification: 1) Points; 2) Head-to-head points; 3) Head-to-head goal difference; 4) Head-to-head goals scored; 5) Goal difference; 6) Goals scored; 7) Fair-play points; 8) Draw.
(C) Champions; (O) Promotion play-off winners; (P) Promoted; (R) Relegated

=== Group 2 ===
Pos	Team	Pld	W	D	L	GF	GA	GD	Pts	Promotion, qualification or relegation
1	PSS (P)	27	16	8	3	53	19	+34	56 (Note: Head-to-head points: PSS 5, Persipura 2.)	Promotion to the 2026–27 Super League and qualification for the final
2	Persipura	27	17	5	5	44	17	+27	56	Qualification for the promotion play-off
3	Barito Putera	27	15	8	4	41	18	+23	53	
4	Kendal Tornado	27	15	5	7	47	21	+26	50	
5	Deltras	27	13	3	11	39	33	+6	42	
6	Persela	27	11	8	8	34	26	+8	41	
7	Persiku	27	7	6	14	35	41	−6	27	
8	PSIS	27	6	5	16	22	50	−28	23	
9	Persiba (X)	27	4	7	16	24	43	−19	19	Qualification for the relegation play-off
10	Persipal (R)	27	0	7	20	19	90	−71	7	Relegation to the 2026–27 Liga Nusantara

Source: Championship 2025–26
Rules for classification: 1) Points; 2) Head-to-head points; 3) Head-to-head goal difference; 4) Head-to-head goals scored; 5) Goal difference; 6) Goals scored; 7) Fair-play points; 8) Draw.
(P) Promoted; (R) Relegated; (X) Relegation play-off winners

== Results ==
Teams play each other three times, twice in the first half of the season (home and away) and once in the second half of the season (either home or away) with each team playing 27 matches.

=== Group 1 ===
Home \ Away	AFC	FBC	GFC	TGL	KAD	PRJ	MDN	PKU	SFC	SSU
Adhyaksa Banten		2–0	3–2	0–1	2–2	1–1	1–1	7–3	15–0	2–1
Adhyaksa Banten					2–1	4–3		2–2	4–0	3–2
Bekasi City	1–1		0–1	2–1	1–2	0–0	1–0	4–0	7–0	1–0
Bekasi City	3–1			1–1		1–0	2–1	3–2		
Garudayaksa	2–0	1–1		4–0	5–1	1–1	2–1	2–2	7–2	0–1
Garudayaksa	0–0	4–0		2–1	3–1		1–0			
Persekat	2–2	0–0	0–0		0–0	0–0	1–1	2–3	1–0	1–1
Persekat	1–2					1–1	2–0		2–0	
Persikad	0–2	0–4	1–1	3–0		0–1	1–0	1–0	3–3	0–1
Persikad		3–2		4–1		2–3	2–2			
Persiraja	2–3	1–1	1–1	1–0	1–0		1–2	4–2	5–0	3–1
Persiraja			2–2				1–1	1–1	2–1	2–0
PSMS	1–0	2–1	0–2	0–1	1–1	1–0		1–0	3–1	2–0
PSMS	1–1							1–1	1–0	3–1
PSPS	1–1	0–0	0–1	2–0	2–3	1–0	3–3		1–0	1–1
PSPS			0–0	4–2	3–1					2–0
Sriwijaya	0–1	1–3	0–2	0–1	0–3	2–3	1–3	2–5		0–5
Sriwijaya		0–1	0–3		1–2			0–6		
Sumsel United	1–2	2–1	0–0	2–0	3–1	3–2	2–1	3–2	1–1	
Sumsel United		1–1	1–0	3–1	1–1				3–0	

Source: Championship 2025–26
Legend: Blue = home team win; Yellow = draw; Red = away team win.
For upcoming matches, an "a" indicates there is an article about the rivalry between the two participants.

=== Group 2 ===
Home \ Away	BAR	DTS	TRD	PSL	BPP	KDS	PAL	PSP	SMG	PSS
Barito Putera		1–0	1–0	0–1	3–0	1–0	5–0	1–1	1–0	1–1
Barito Putera			0–0		3–3	1–1	8–3			1–0
Deltras	0–1		3–1	1–2	1–1	4–2	3–1	2–0	2–0	1–1
Deltras	0–2		0–2	1–2	2–1				0–1	
Kendal Tornado	1–2	0–1		0–0	2–0	0–0	4–0	1–0	4–1	2–1
Kendal Tornado				5–0	3–0		4–0	2–1		1–1
Persela	0–0	1–2	0–1		1–0	2–1	2–0	1–2	1–1	2–1
Persela	1–1				2–0		7–1			0–1
Persiba	1–0	1–2	1–3	0–3		3–0	3–2	1–2	0–1	1–2
Persiba						0–0		0–1	0–0	1–1
Persiku	0–2	2–4	0–2	1–1	2–1		1–1	1–2	3–0	1–3
Persiku		1–2	1–0	1–0					3–3	
Persipal	0–3	0–0	2–2	1–3	1–1	1–4		0–0	1–1	0–3
Persipal		2–4			1–1	1–4		0–5		
Persipura	1–0	1–0	2–3	2–0	1–0	1–0	3–0		2–0	1–1
Persipura	4–1	3–0		0–0		2–0			3–1	
PSIS	0–1	0–3	0–3	1–0	1–2	0–4	2–0	0–4		0–5
PSIS	0–1		1–0	1–1			6–1			
PSS	0–0	1–0	3–1	1–1	2–1	2–1	4–0	0–0	2–1	
PSS		3–1				2–1	7–0	2–0	3–0	

Source: Championship 2025–26
Legend: Blue = home team win; Yellow = draw; Red = away team win.
For upcoming matches, an "a" indicates there is an article about the rivalry between the two participants.

== Relegation & promotion play-offs ==
The play-offs will be played as a single match. If tied after regulation time, extra time and, if necessary, a penalty shoot-out will be used to decide the winning team. The home team is decided through the team that has the higher points during the group phase.

=== Relegation play-off ===
The loser will be relegated to the 2026–27 Liga Nusantara.

8 May 2026
15:00 WIB

Persekat	1–2	Persiba
Syahertian 67'	Report	Sabda 17'; Dwi Geno 71'

Trisanja Stadium, Tegal
Attendance: 3,676
Referee: Firdavs Norsafarov (Uzbekistan)

=== Promotion play-off ===
The winner will be promoted to the 2026–27 Super League.

8 May 2026
17:00 WIT

Persipura	0–1	Adhyaksa Banten
	Report	Adilson 45+1'

Lukas Enembe Stadium, Jayapura
Attendance: 35,335
Referee: Asker Nadjafaliev (Uzbekistan)

== Final ==
The final will be played as a single match. If tied after regulation time, extra time and, if necessary, a penalty shoot-out will be used to decide the winning team.

9 May 2026
19:00 WIB

PSS	2–2 (a.e.t.)	Garudayaksa
Tocantins 60', 90+2'	Report	Kelilauw 23'; Everton 36' (pen.)
Penalties
Haqi (penalty scored); Gomes (penalty missed); Mofu (penalty scored); Alfareza (penalty scored); Tocantins (penalty missed)	3–4	(penalty missed) Everton; (penalty scored) Cingi; (penalty scored) Frýdek; (penalty scored) Tri Maulana; (penalty scored) Hidayat

Maguwoharjo Stadium, Sleman
Attendance: 16,476
Referee: Yoko Supriyanto

== Season statistics ==
=== Top scorers ===
Rank	Player	Club	Goals
1	(Portugal) Adilson Silva	Adhyaksa Banten	26
2	(Brazil) Gustavo Tocantins	PSS	24
3	(Brazil) Igor Henrique	Persiku	21
4	(Scotland) Connor Flynn-Gillespie	Persiraja	17
5	(Brazil) Patrick Cruz	Kendal Tornado	15
5	(Brazil) Juninho Cabral	Sumsel United	15
7	(Chad) Ezechiel N'Douassel	Bekasi City	14
7	(Brazil) Everton	Garudayaksa	14
9	(Indonesia) Ramadhan	Bekasi City	12
9	(Japan) Takumu Nishihara	Persiba	12
9	(Argentina) Felipe Cadenazzi	PSMS	12

=== Hat-tricks ===
Player	For	Against	Result	Date
(Brazil) Igor Henrique	Persiku	PSIS	4–0 (A)	14 September 2025
(Brazil) Igor Henrique	Persiku	PSIS	3–0 (H)	11 November 2025
(Nicaragua) Jaime Moreno	Barito Putera	Persipal	5–0 (H)	27 September 2025
(Portugal) Adilson Silva^{4}	Adhyaksa Banten	PSPS	7–3 (H)	1 November 2025
(Brazil) Patrick Cruz	Kendal Tornado	Persiba	3–1 (A)	28 December 2025
(Brazil) Igor Henrique	Persiku	Persipal	4–1 (A)	12 January 2026
(Brazil) Igor Henrique	Persiku	Persipal	4–1 (A)	27 February 2026
(Indonesia) Ramadhan^{4}	Bekasi City	Sriwijaya	7–0 (H)	16 January 2026
(Argentina) Ramiro Fergonzi	Adhyaksa Banten	Sriwijaya	15–0 (H)	29 January 2026
(Indonesia) Miftahul Hamdi	Adhyaksa Banten	Sriwijaya	15–0 (H)	29 January 2026
(Mali) Makan Konaté	Adhyaksa Banten	Sriwijaya	15–0 (H)	29 January 2026
(Portugal) Adilson Silva^{6}	Adhyaksa Banten	Sriwijaya	15–0 (H)	29 January 2026
(Indonesia) Beto Gonçalves	PSIS	Persipal	6–1 (H)	29 March 2026
(Brazil) Gustavo Tocantins^{4}	PSS	Persipal	7–0 (H)	4 April 2026
(Indonesia) Risqki Putra Utomo^{4}	Persela	Persipal	7–1 (H)	18 April 2026
(Chad) Ezechiel N'Douassel	Bekasi City	Adhyaksa Banten	3–1 (H)	18 April 2026
(Brazil) Antônio Gamaroni	PSPS	Persekat	4–2 (H)	19 April 2026

Note:
^{4} Player scored 4 goals
^{5} Player scored 5 goals
^{6} Player scored 6 goals

=== Clean sheets ===
Rank	Player	Club	Clean Sheets
1	(Indonesia) Adzib Al Hakim	Persipura	14
2	(Indonesia) Muhammad Ridho	Barito Putera	11
2	(Indonesia) Try Hamdani	Kendal Tornado	11
4	(Indonesia) Rudi Nurdin	Garudayaksa	10
5	(Indonesia) Ikram Algiffari	Bekasi City	7
5	(Indonesia) Dimas Fani	Persekat	7
5	(Indonesia) Mario Londok	Persela (4); PSIS (3)	7
5	(Indonesia) Muhammad Reza	Persiraja	7
9	(Indonesia) Satria Tama	Barito Putera	6

== Attendances ==
=== Overall ===
Pos	Team	Total	High	Low	Average	Change
1	Persipura	223,519	35,335	5,917	14,901	+535.4%
2	PSS	132,593	16,476	5,574	8,840	n/a^{†}
3	PSPS	75,258	8,558	3,056	5,789	−32.9%
4	Barito Putera	69,415	8,072	3,274	4,958	n/a^{†}
5	Persiraja	48,305	6,982	2,092	3,450	−32.4%
6	Sriwijaya	44,429	10,107	1,752	3,417	−12.9%
7	PSIS	42,451	9,571	180	3,265	n/a^{†}
8	Persiba	37,587	9,220	534	2,891	n/a^{†}
9	Deltras	37,821	8,648	995	2,701	+45.6%
10	Persiku	31,388	6,336	86	2,414	−39.3%
11	PSMS	30,889	7,302	424	2,376	+55.9%
12	Adhyaksa Banten	30,148	7,238	156	2,153	+2,053.0%
13	Persekat	18,138	3,676	508	1,295	+0.9%
14	Sumsel United	17,723	3,328	828	1,266	+162.7%
15	Persikad	10,135	1,389	352	780	n/a^{‡}
16	Bekasi City	8,743	2,177	177	624	−24.4%
17	Garudayaksa	6,624	1,758	40	473	+77.8%
18	Persipal	4,291	1,612	435	330	−92.8%
19	Kendal Tornado	1,358	735	50	97	n/a^{‡}
20	Persela	0	0	0	0	−100.0%
	League total	870,816	35,335	40	3,034	+25.1%

Updated to games played on 3 May 2026
Source: Championship 2025–26
Notes:
^{†} Teams played previous season in Super League
^{‡} Teams played previous season in Liga Nusantara

=== Home match played ===
As of 3 May 2026

Team \ Match played	Regular phase														Play-offs & Final	Total
Team \ Match played	1	2	3	4	5	6	7	8	9	10	11	12	13	14	Play-offs & Final	Total
Adhyaksa Banten	7,238	4,915	1,820	3,325	3,781	156	896	1,226	1,982	1,211	976	821	948	853		30,148
Barito Putera	4,067	3,838	4,451	3,542	4,679	3,274	0^{3}	7,360	8,072	6,104	4,845	7,379	6,833	4,971		69,415
Bekasi City	2,177	717	511	377	1,117	177	517	311	507	312	977	355	377	311		8,743
Deltras	6,100	3,205	3,066	3,200	1,281	4,787	8,648	1,964	2,062	1,197	1,316	3,980	0^{3}	995		37,821
Garudayaksa	1,158	125	237	299	388	623	425	539	500	40	130	275	127	1,758		6,624
Kendal Tornado	735	0^{3}	265	50	108	0^{3}	0^{3}	0^{3}	100	0^{3}	100	0^{3}	0^{3}	0^{3}		1,358
Persekat	0^{3}	2,000	1,830	761	1,020	1,710	1,377	1,030	508	1,197	1,487	835	707		3,676	18,138
Persela	0^{1}	0^{1}	0^{1}	0^{1}	0^{1}	0^{1}	0^{1}	0^{1}	0^{1}	0^{1}	0^{1}	0^{1}	0^{1}			0^{1}
Persiba	4,015	4,176	2,469	1,367	633	970	0^{3}	0^{3}	1,107	555	534	9,220	12,541			37,587
Persikad	1,389	1,336	1,387	991	711	426	763	718	352	620	413	467	562			10,135
Persiku	6,336	2,002	1,183	971	2,440	3,155	3,098	2,822	3,020	0^{3}	2,032	4,243	86			31,388
Persipal	0^{3}	1,612	665	511	515	435	553	0^{3}	0^{3}	0^{3}	0^{3}	0^{3}	0^{3}			4,291
Persipura	8,363	9,290	5,917	6,645	7,137	7,189	8,191	12,881	19,612	20,270	14,993	17,394	17,462	32,840	35,335	223,519
Persiraja	6,690	5,221	3,873	2,374	2,692	2,107	2,092	6,982	3,792	3,822	2,698	3,074	2,888	0^{4}		48,305
PSIS	2,024	0^{3}	180	0^{3}	0^{3}	5,448	7,050	9,571	3,122	5,103	2,706	3,066	4,181			42,451
PSMS	6,136	7,302	2,049	1,859	3,997	2,730	0^{3}	943	1,348	1,649	1,049	424	1,403			30,889
PSPS	7,835	4,628	6,046	5,153	3,568	3,056	7,535	8,558	7,523	0^{3}	6,750	6,510	8,096			75,258
PSS	0^{2}	0^{2}	9,558	13,273	13,979	0^{3}	13,662	11,166	12,967	5,574	6,484	5,784	7,654	16,016	16,476	132,593
Sriwijaya	10,107	8,745	5,114	4,365	3,666	3,510	2,853	1,752	4,317	0^{3}	0^{3}	0^{3}	0^{3}			44,429
Sumsel United	3,328	1,665	1,465	0^{3}	1,267	937	1,508	1,272	2,026	828	0^{3}	1,540	1,044	843		17,723
League total																870,816

Source: Championship 2025–26

Notes

1. Persela received sanctions in the form of holding all home matches without spectators and a fine of IDR 110 million.
2. PSS received sanctions in the form of holding two home matches without spectators and a fine of IDR 270 million.
3. Match played behind closed doors.
4. Persiraja received sanctions in the form of holding home matches without spectators and a fine of IDR 30 million.

== Awards ==
=== Monthly awards ===
Month	Player of the Month		Young Player of the Month		Coach of the Month		Goal of the Month	
Month	Player	Team	Player	Team	Coach	Team	Player	Team
September	(Chile) Vicente Concha	Garudayaksa	(Indonesia) Ikram Algiffari	Bekasi City	(Indonesia) Ansyari Lubis	PSS	(Mali) Makan Konaté	Adhyaksa Banten
September	References:							
October	(France) Frédéric Injaï	PSS	(Indonesia) Alfin Kelilauw	Garudayaksa	(Indonesia) Doel Khamid	Garudayaksa	(Argentina) Felipe Cadenazzi	PSMS
October	References:							
November	(Indonesia) Fitra Ridwan	Persiraja	(Indonesia) Ariel Kurung	Persiraja	(Indonesia) Stefano Cugurra	Barito Putera	(Indonesia) Boaz Solossa	Persipura
November	References:							
December								
December	References:							
January								
January	References:							
February								
February	References:							
March								
March	References:							
April								
April	References:							
May								
May	References:							

=== Annual awards ===
Award	Winner	Club	Ref.
Best Player	(Brazil) Gustavo Tocantins	PSS Sleman	
Best Coach	(Indonesia) Ade Suhendra	Adhyaksa Banten	
Best Young Player	(Indonesia) Ikram Algiffari	Bekasi City	
Fair Play Team	Persipura Jayapura		

=== Team of the season ===
Pos.	Player	Team	Ref.
GK	(Indonesia) Ikram Algiffari	Bekasi City	
DF	(Indonesia) Alfin Kelilauw	Garudayaksa	
DF	(Brazil) Artur	Persipura	
DF	(Indonesia) Fabiano Beltrame	Barito Putera	
DF	(Indonesia) Aditya Daffa	Bartio Putera	
MF	(Indonesia) Bima Ragil	Persipura	
MF	(Indonesia) Bayu Pradana	Barito Putera	
MF	(Indonesia) Asir Aziz	PSPS	
MF	(Brazil) Diego Dall’oca	Sumsel United	
MF	(Indonesia) Riko Simanjuntak	PSS	
FW	(Brazil) Gustavo Tocantins	PSS	

== See also ==
- 2025–26 Super League
- 2025–26 Liga Nusantara
- 2025–26 Liga 4
