= Ifan Nanda Pratama =

Indonesian footballer

Personal information
- Full name: Ifan Nanda Pratama
- Date of birth: 29 March 2001 (age 25)
- Place of birth: Kudus, Indonesia
- Height: 1.81 m (5 ft 11 in)
- Position: Centre-back

Team information
- Current team: Persela Lamongan
- Number: 56

Youth career
- 2020–2021: PSS Sleman

Senior career*
Years	Team	Apps	(Gls)
2021–2025	PSS Sleman	33	(1)
2023–2024	→ PSM Makassar (loan)	2	(0)
2026	Persiku Kudus	13	(0)
2026–	Persela Lamongan	0	(0)
- * Club domestic league appearances and goals as of 3 May 2026

Ifan Nanda Pratama (born 29 March 2001) is an Indonesian professional footballer who plays as a centre-back for Championship club Persela Lamongan.

== Club career ==
=== PSS Sleman ===
Ifan signed with PSS Sleman to play in the Indonesian Liga 1 for the 2021 season. He made his professional league debut on 16 February 2022 in a match against Bali United at the Ngurah Rai Stadium, Denpasar. He scored his first league goal for the club on 9 February 2023, scored the winning goal in a 2–1 against Persik Kediri.

== Career statistics ==
=== Club ===
As of 3 May 2026

Club	Season	League			Cup		Continental		Other (Note: Appearances in Indonesia President's Cup)		Total	
Club	Season	Division	Apps	Goals	Apps	Goals	Apps	Goals	Apps	Goals	Apps	Goals
PSS Sleman	2021–22	Liga 1	1	0	0	0	–		0	0	1	0
PSS Sleman	2022–23	Liga 1	18	1	0	0	–		1	0	19	1
PSS Sleman	2023–24	Liga 1	0	0	0	0	–		0	0	0	0
PSS Sleman	2024–25	Liga 1	13	0	0	0	–		0	0	13	0
PSS Sleman	2025–26	Championship	1	0	0	0	–		0	0	0	0
PSM Makassar (loan)	2023–24	Liga 1	2	0	0	0	–		0	0	2	0
Persiku Kudus	2025–26	Championship	13	0	0	0	–		0	0	13	0
Career total			48	1	0	0	0	0	1	0	49	1
