= Muhammad Rifaldi =

Indonesian footballer (born 1996)

Personal information
- Full name: Muhammad Rifaldi
- Date of birth: 3 October 1996 (age 30)
- Place of birth: Palu, Indonesia
- Height: 1.75 m (5 ft 9 in)
- Position: Right-back

Team information
- Current team: Persipal Palu
- Number: 8

Senior career*
Years	Team	Apps	(Gls)
2016–2017	Persipal Palu	5	(0)
2018–2019	Persinga Ngawi	13	(0)
2019	Bandung United	21	(0)
2020	Sriwijaya	0	(0)
2021–2022	Persiraja Banda Aceh	28	(0)
2022–2023	Persik Kediri	6	(0)
2023	→ Dewa United (loan)	0	(0)
2023–2024	Kalteng Putra	12	(0)
2024	Sriwijaya	8	(0)
2025–	Persipal Palu	11	(0)
- * Club domestic league appearances and goals as of 3 January 2026

Muhammad Rifaldi (born 3 October 1996) is an Indonesian professional footballer who plays as a right-back for Championship club Persipal Palu.

== Club career ==
=== Bandung United ===
In 2019, Rifaldi signed a contract with Indonesian Liga 2 club Bandung United.

=== Sriwijaya ===
He was signed for Sriwijaya to play in Liga 2 in the 2020 season. This season was suspended on 27 March 2020 due to the COVID-19 pandemic. The season was abandoned and was declared void on 20 January 2021.

=== Persiraja Banda Aceh ===
In 2021, Rifaldi signed a contract with Indonesian Liga 1 club Persiraja Banda Aceh. Rifaldi made his first-team debut on 29 August 2021 in a match against Bhayangkara at the Indomilk Arena, Tangerang.

=== Persik Kediri ===
Rifaldi was signed for Persik Kediri to play in Liga 1 in the 2022–23 season. He made his league debut on 19 August 2022 in a match against PSIS Semarang at the Jatidiri Stadium, Semarang.

== Career statistics ==
=== Club ===
As of match played 3 January 2026

Club	Season	League			Domestic Cup		Continental		Other		Total	
Club	Season	Division	Apps	Goals	Apps	Goals	Apps	Goals	Apps	Goals	Apps	Goals
Persipal Palu	2016	ISC C	5	0	0	0	–		0	0	5	0
Persinga Ngawi	2018	Liga 3	13	0	0	0	–		0	0	13	0
Bandung United	2019	Liga 2	21	0	0	0	–		0	0	21	0
Sriwijaya	2020	Liga 2	0	0	0	0	–		0	0	0	0
Persiraja Banda Aceh	2021–22	Liga 1	29	0	0	0	–		0	0	29	0
Persik Kediri	2022–23	Liga 1	6	0	0	0	–		2 (Note: Appearances in Indonesia President's Cup)	0	8	0
Dewa United (loan)	2022–23	Liga 1	0	0	0	0	–		0	0	0	0
Kalteng Putra	2023–24	Liga 2	12	0	0	0	–		0	0	12	0
Sriwijaya	2024–25	Liga 2	6	0	0	0	–		0	0	6	0
Persipal Palu	2025–26	Liga 2	8	0	0	0	–		0	0	8	0
Career total			100	0	0	0	0	0	2	0	102	0
