= 2010 SK Brann season =

Brann
2010 season
- Manager: Steinar Nilsen (until May 21); Rune Skarsfjord (from May 21)
- Stadium: Brann Stadion
- Tippeligaen: 13th
- Norwegian Cup: 2nd round
- Top goalscorer: League: Petter Vaagan Moen (14); All: Petter Vaagan Moen (15)

The 2010 season is SK Brann's 102nd season and their 24th consecutive season in the Tippeligaen.

== Information ==
| Head coach | Steinar Nilsen (until May 21); Rune Skarsfjord (caretaker May 21-December 31) |
| League | Tippeligaen |
| Shirt supplier | Kappa |
| Shirt sponsor | Sparebanken Vest |
| Average league attendance | 13,744 (-13,58%) |
| League result | 13th |
| Norwegian Cup | Second round (0-1 against Fyllingen) |
| Top goalscorer | Petter Vaagan Moen (14 in league, 1 in cup, 15 in total) |
| Player of the year | Petter Vaagan Moen |

== Season events ==
- January 1: Knut Walde's contract expired. He had been loaned out to Løv-Ham since the 2008 season. Due to studies in physiatrics, he decided to take a six-month break from football
- January 1: Kristján Örn Sigurðsson's contract expired. He turned down an offer from Brann in March 2009, citing a wish to play abroad. His agent claimed interest from clubs in England and Austria. Sigurðsson signed with the newly promoted Tippliga-club Hønefoss BK on January 7.
- January 22: Erik Mjelde signed a four-year deal with Brann, returning to Bergen after four seasons in Sandefjord.
- February 16: Brann and Løv-Ham agreed on a one-year loan-deal for the talented striker Matias Møvik.
- March 13: Brann opened the premiership season with a 0–0 draw against FK Haugesund at home. This match marked the earliest season opener in Norwegian football history.
- March 29: Brann took their first three-pointer of the season in a 3–2 win over Sandefjord. This match marked the first Tippeliga match on Brann Stadion since April 18, 2006 to feature an attendance lower than 15,000.
- April 14: Bjørn Dahl resigned as managing director of Brann after ten years in the position. Branns vice-chairman Lars Moldestad was temporarily appointed as new managing director.
- May 3: Steinar Nilsen was given the position director of football in addition to his job as head coach. Roald Bruun-Hanssen who had held the job as director since 2007 was given the newly created position of "Operative leader/Strategic controller", working as assistant and deputy to the managing director Lars Moldestad.
- May 5: David Nielsen announced his intention to retire when his contract expires on June 30.
- May 13: Brann advanced to the second round of the Norwegian Cup after a 2–0 win over Arna-Bjørnar.
- May 19: Brann was knocked-out of Norwegian Cup after a shocking 0-1 defeat against the fourth-tier team Fyllingen in the second round of the tournament.
- May 21: News broke that Steinar Nilsen had resigned as head coach of SK Brann after a terrible start to the season, where Brann only managed to capture ten points in their first 12 matches, placing them on a thirteenth place on the table, only two points from relegation. The club was also knocked-out of the Norwegian Cup after losing to Fyllingen, a team consisting of amateurs and who at the time played in the fourth-tier in Norway. His resignation came, supposedly, after a meeting with the players, where they criticised some of his methods and questioned his competence.
- May 22: Steinar Nilsen held a press conference where he confirmed the news that leaked out to the media the previous day. He was finished in Brann and had decided to move back to his home town Tromsø. Nilsens assistant Rune Skarsfjord took over as head coach and Director of football in a caretaker-role until Brann could find a new head coach.
- May 29: Brann announced that Ólafur Örn Bjarnason would be leaving the club on August 1 to join his childhood club Grindavík in a player-head coach position.
- June 2: Brann took another hit on the human resources side when Hans Brandtun announced his immediate resignation as chairman, stating that stress and high work rate made it impossible for him to continue. Lars Moldestad took over his duties in addition to his job as Managing Director. Since the start of the season Brann had lost its managing director, head coach, director of football and chairman.
- June 5: David Nielsen signed an extension to his contract allowing him to play throughout July.
- June 6: Brann entered the summer break with a 2–1 win against Aalesund in front of a packed Brann Stadion. With 14 of 30 rounds played, Brann climbed to a 13th place on the table with 13 points, 2 points above relegation and 17 points behind the leading team Rosenborg.
- June 9: Lars Moldestad announced that Rune Skarsfjord would continue in his caretaker role at Brann throughout the 2010-season.
- June 14: Brann signed Christian Kalvenes for the third time in his career, giving him a contract throughout the 2010-season. The 33-year-old defender signed on a free transfer after ending his employment with Burnley in April 2010.
- July 19: Brann signed the Hungarian center back Zsolt Korcsmár on a six-month loan deal from Újpest FC.
- July 30: David Nielsen signed an extension to his contract allowing him to finish the season in Brann. He was also given a minor role in the coaching staff.
- August 10 Brann bought the talented local lad Fredrik Haugen from Løv-Ham. The youngster signed a three-year deal with the club. It was decided that it would be best for Haugen to finish off the season in Løv-Ham with the transfer deal coming into effect in November 2010.
- August 12: Brann brought in two young Brazilian talents on a loan deal. Jacinto Júnior Conceição Cabral and Diego Henrique Pachega de Souza came from Desportivo Brasil whom Brann had made a collaboration deal with earlier in the summer. The players were initially brought in to play for the reserve team, but if proven worthy, both would get the chance to play for the first team.
- August 20: Roald Bruun-Hansen was hired as new managing director of Brann.
- August 27: Bjarte Haugsdal went to Løv-Ham on a loan deal for the remainder of the season.
- September 15: Lars Grorud signed a three-year contract with Brann. Songdal's skipper came on a fee transfer and would join Brann in January 2011.
- September 15: Jan Gunnar Solli agreed to a deal with New York Red Bulls pending a medical in December.
- October 21: Cato Guntveit announced his decision to retire after the season. The local lad played 13 years for the club over two spells.
- October 26: Eirik Bakke signed a three-year contract with Songdal, leaving Brann on a free transfer after the season.
- October 27: Gylfi Einarsson signed a three-year deal with Icelandic side Fylkir. The midfielder was not offered a new contract with Brann and left on a free transfer at the conclusion of the season.
- November 1: Rune Skarsfjord was announced as Brann's new head coach after signing a three-year deal with the club. The former assistant coach had been in charge of the team in a caretaker role since Steinar Nilsen agreed to end his employment with Brann at the end of May 2010.
- November 7: Brann finished of a horrible season with a 1–1 draw against Odd Grenland at Brann Stadion. Brann ended up as number 13 in the league, two places above direct relegation and only one place and seven points above relegation play-off. This was Branns lowest league placement in history, but due to several expansions of the Tippeligaen over the years, Brann did not get relegated this season.
- November 11: Petter Vaagan Moen signed a two-and-a-half-year deal with Queens Park Rangers after his contract with Brann expired. While Branns top goalscorer left for London, a fresh face was announced at Brann Stadion as Kongsvinger's Carl-Erik Torp was signed on a free transfer.
- November 19: Petter Vaagan Moen was crowned Brann's player of the year by local newspaper Bergens Tidende. He had previously been given the same honour by the Brann supporters.
- November 21: Matias Møvik was told his contract with Brann would not be renewed. He prepared himself for a new season in Løv-Ham, the club he was loaned out to during the 2010 season.
- December 8: Brann signed a three-year deal with Kim Ojo. The Nigerian striker came on a free transfer from Nybergsund IL-Trysil.

== Squad ==
Note: Flags indicate national team as defined under FIFA eligibility rules; some limited exceptions apply. Players may hold more than one non-FIFA nationality.

| No. | Pos. | Nation | Player |
|---|---|---|---|
| 1 | GK | (Norway) NOR | Jørgen Mohus |
| 2 | DF | (Iceland) ISL | Birkir Sævarsson |
| 3 | DF | (Norway) NOR | Christian Kalvenes |
| 4 | DF | (Norway) NOR | Cato Guntveit |
| 5 | MF | (Jamaica) JAM | Rudolph Austin |
| 6 | MF | (Norway) NOR | Erik Mjelde |
| 7 | MF | (Norway) NOR | Hassan El Fakiri |
| 8 | MF | (Iceland) ISL | Gylfi Einarsson |
| 9 | MF | (Norway) NOR | Jan Gunnar Solli |
| 10 | FW | (Denmark) DEN | David Nielsen |
| 11 | MF | (Norway) NOR | Petter Vaagan Moen |
| 12 | GK | (Norway) NOR | Håkon Opdal (C) |
| 13 | FW | (Norway) NOR | Erik Huseklepp |

| No. | Pos. | Nation | Player |
|---|---|---|---|
| 14 | MF | (The Gambia) GAM | Tijan Jaiteh |
| 15 | FW | (Uruguay) URU | Diego Guastavino |
| 16 | MF | (Norway) NOR | Bjarte Haugsdal |
| 17 | MF | (Norway) NOR | Eirik Bakke |
| 18 | DF | (Iceland) ISL | Ólafur Örn Bjarnason |
| 18 | MF | (Brazil) BRA | Diego |
| 19 | FW | (Norway) NOR | Cato Hansen |
| 20 | FW | (Brazil) BRA | Juninho |
| 21 | DF | (Hungary) HUN | Zsolt Korcsmár |
| 25 | DF | (Norway) NOR | Yaw Ihle Amankwah |
| 24 | GK | (Norway) NOR | Kenneth Udjus |
| 26 | DF | (Norway) NOR | Bjørnar Holmvik |

=== Out on loan ===
Note: Flags indicate national team as defined under FIFA eligibility rules; some limited exceptions apply. Players may hold more than one non-FIFA nationality.

| No. / Pos. / Nation / Player; — / FW / (Norway) NOR / Matias Møvik (on loan to Løv-Ham) | No. / Pos. / Nation / Player; — / MF / (Norway) NOR / Bjarte Haugsdal (on loan to Løv-Ham) |

== Team kit ==
The team kits for the 2010 season were produced by Kappa and the main shirt sponsor was Sparebanken Vest. Other sponsors featured on the kit were BKK (shoulders), JM Byggholt (chest), AXA (left arm), Chess (upper back), Frydenbø (shorts) and Tide (socks).

| Home | Away |

== Transfers ==
=== Players in ===
Only first team squad transfers

Winter 2009/10

- Erik Mjelde from Sandefjord.

Summer 2009/10

- Christian Kalvenes on free transfer.
- Zsolt Korcsmár from Újpest (loan).
- Juninho from Desportivo Brasil (loan).
- Diego from Desportivo Brasil (loan).

=== Players out ===
Only first team squad transfers

Winter 2009/10

- Johan Thorbjørnsen to Løv-Ham.
- Knut Walde's contract expired.
- Kristján Örn Sigurðsson to Hønefoss.
- Matias Møvik to Løv-Ham (loan).

Summer 2009/10

- Ólafur Örn Bjarnason to Grindavik.
- Bjarte Haugsdal to Løv-Ham (loan).

== Competitions ==
=== Tippeligaen ===
==== Results summary ====
| Overall | | | | | | | | Home | | | | | | Away | | | | | |
| Pld | W | D | L | GF | GA | GD | Pts | W | D | L | GF | GA | GD | W | D | L | GF | GA | GD |
|---|---|---|---|---|---|---|---|---|---|---|---|---|---|---|---|---|---|---|---|
| 30 | 8 | 10 | 12 | 48 | 50 | −2 | 34 | 5 | 7 | 3 | 29 | 23 | +6 | 3 | 3 | 9 | 19 | 27 | −8 |

==== Results by round ====
| Round | 1 | 2 | 3 | 4 | 5 | 6 | 7 | 8 | 9 | 10 | 11 | 12 | 13 | 14 | 15 | 16 | 17 | 18 | 19 | 20 | 21 | 22 | 23 | 24 | 25 | 26 | 27 | 28 | 29 | 30 |
|---|---|---|---|---|---|---|---|---|---|---|---|---|---|---|---|---|---|---|---|---|---|---|---|---|---|---|---|---|---|---|
| Ground | H | A | H | A | H | A | H | H | A | H | A | H | A | H | A | A | H | A | H | A | A | H | A | H | A | H | A | H | A | H |
| Result | D | L | W | L | L | L | D | W | D | L | L | D | L | W | W | D | D | W | D | L | D | D | W | L | L | W | L | W | L | D |
| Position | 8 | 13 | 10 | 14 | 14 | 15 | 13 | 13 | 13 | 13 | 13 | 13 | 15 | 13 | 12 | 12 | 12 | 12 | 12 | 12 | 12 | 12 | 12 | 12 | 12 | 12 | 13 | 13 | 13 | 13 |

Updated to match(es) played on 7 November 2010. Source: see below
A = Away; H = Home; W = Win; D = Draw; L = Loss

==== Results ====
| 13 March 2010 1 | Brann | 0–0 | Haugesund | Bergen |
| 17:00 | | Report | | Stadium: Brann Stadion; Attendance: 15,005; Referee: Tommy Skjerven |

| 21 March 2010 2 | Viking | 4–0 | Brann | Stavanger |
| 20:00 | Ingelsten 8'; Nisja 20'; Ødegaard 40'; Bjarnason 60' | Report | | Stadium: Viking Stadion; Attendance: 12,861; Referee: Tom Henning Øvrebø |

| 29 March 2010 3 | Brann | 3–2 | Sandefjord | Bergen |
| 19:00 | Mjelde 53'; Guastavino 83', 90' | Report | Bindia 56'; Ertsås 62' | Stadium: Brann Stadion; Attendance: 12,102; Referee: Tom Harald Hagen |

| 5 April 2010 4 | Molde | 3–2 | Brann | Molde |
| 20:00 | Hestad 44'; Hoseth 57'; Moström 69' | Report | Moen 3'; Huseklepp 24' | Stadium: Aker Stadion; Attendance: 8,007; Referee: Bernt Thomas Berntsen |

| 11 April 2010 5 | Brann | 3–4 | Start | Bergen |
| 20:00 | Guastavino 2'; Mjelde 27'; Bakke 90+2' | Report | Årst 10', 39'; Bolaños 22'; Kleiven 57' | Stadium: Brann Stadion; Attendance: 13,011; Referee: Ken Henry Johnsen |

| 14 April 2010 6 | Rosenborg | 3–0 | Brann | Trondheim |
| 20:00 | Iversen 57'; Sellin 75', 85' | Report | | Stadium: Lerkendal Stadion; Attendance: 18,727; Referee: Brage Sandmoen |

| 18 April 2010 7 | Brann | 1–1 | Vålerenga | Bergen |
| 20:00 | Huseklepp 80' | Report | Moh. Abdellaoue 12' | Stadium: Brann Stadion; Attendance: 12,243; Referee: Svein Oddvar Moen |

| 25 April 2010 8 | Brann | 4–0 | Strømsgodset | Bergen |
| 18:00 | Moen 13', 87'; Guastavino 45+1', 71' | Report | | Stadium: Brann Stadion; Attendance: 12,500; Referee: Roy Helge Olsen |

| 2 May 2010 9 | Odd Grenland | 0–0 | Brann | Skien |
| 18:00 | | Report | | Stadium: Skagerak Arena; Attendance: 6,988; Referee: Dag Vidar Hafsås |

| 5 May 2010 10 | Brann | 0–1 | Tromsø | Bergen |
| 19:00 | | Report | Rushfeldt 29' | Stadium: Brann Stadion; Attendance: 13,204; Referee: Per Ivar Staberg |

| 9 May 2010 11 | Stabæk | 2–1 | Brann | Oslo |
| 20:00 | Hoff 14'; Eiríksson 45+1' | Report | Moen 30' | Stadium: Ullevaal Stadion; Attendance: 7,300; Referee: Espen Berntsen |

| 16 May 2010 12 | Brann | 1–1 | Lillestrøm | Bergen |
| 20:00 | Moen 90+6' | Report | Igiebor 50' | Stadium: Brann Stadion; Attendance: 17,085; Referee: Tommy Skjerven |

| 24 May 2010 13 | Hønefoss | 2–0 | Brann | Hønefoss |
| 20:00 | Opdal 6' (o.g.); Holmvik 12' (o.g.) | Report | | Stadium: AKA Arena; Attendance: 4,489; Referee: Svein Oddvar Moen |

| 6 June 2010 14 | Brann | 2–1 | Aalesund | Bergen |
| 20:00 | Sævarsson 13'; Moen 21' | Report | Silva 89' | Stadium: Brann Stadion; Attendance: 17,244; Referee: Tom Henning Øvrebø |

| 4 July 2010 15 | Kongsvinger | 0–3 | Brann | Kongsvinger |
| 18:00 | | Report | Solli 25'; Bakke 43'; Moen 73' | Stadium: Gjemselund Stadion; Attendance: 2,661; Referee: Dag Vidar Hafsås |

| 10 July 2010 16 | Haugesund | 1–1 | Brann | Haugesund |
| 18:00 | Mæland 45+4' | Report | Mjelde 24' | Stadium: Haugesund Stadion; Attendance: 5,000; Referee: Kristoffer Helgerud |

| 18 July 2010 17 | Brann | 2–2 | Stabæk | Bergen |
| 18:00 | Solli 37'; Huseklepp 59' | Report | Diskerud 24'; Gunnarsson 49' | Stadium: Brann Stadion; Attendance: 13,504; Referee: Roy Helge Olsen |

| 25 July 2010 18 | Sandefjord | 1–4 | Brann | Sandefjord |
| 18:00 | Hansen 85' | Report | Bakke 17'; Moen 36'; Guastavino 61'; Huseklepp 67' | Stadium: Komplett.no Arena; Attendance: 4,884; Referee: Kristoffer Helgerud |

| 1 August 2010 19 | Brann | 1–1 | Molde | Bergen |
| 20:00 | Huseklepp 61' | Report | Thioune 81' | Stadium: Brann Stadion; Attendance: 13,137; Referee: Svein Oddvar Moen |

| 8 August 2010 20 | Start | 3–1 | Brann | Kristiansand |
| 18:00 | Stokkelien 21' (pen.); Bolaños 23' (65) | Report | Huseklepp 87' (pen.) | Stadium: Sør Arena; Attendance: 9,250; Referee: Anders Johansen |

| 21 August 2010 21 | Strømsgodset | 1–1 | Brann | Drammen |
| 17:00 | Nordkvelle 70' | Report | Guastavino 35' | Stadium: Marienlyst Stadion; Attendance: 6,736; Referee: Espen Berntsen |

| 30 August 2010 22 | Brann | 3–3 | Viking | Bergen |
| 20:00 | Bakke 35'; Moen 55'; Bertelsen 81' (o.g.) | Report | Høiland 4'; Danielsen 12' (pen.); Nevland 57' | Stadium: Brann Stadion; Attendance: 12,893; Referee: Svein-Erik Edvartsen |

| 11 September 2010 23 | Tromsø | 0–3 | Brann | Tromsø |
| 17:00 | | Report | Bakke 21'; Guastavino 37'; Moen 73' | Stadium: Alfheim Stadion; Attendance: 5,807; Referee: Roy Helge Olsen |

| 19 September 2010 24 | Brann | 2–3 | Rosenborg | Bergen |
| 20:00 | Sævarsson 40'; Moen 80' | Report | Henriksen 11', 88'; Iversen 62' (pen.) | Stadium: Brann Stadion; Attendance: 14,901; Referee: Svein Oddvar Moen |

| 26 September 2010 25 | Vålerenga | 1–0 | Brann | Oslo |
| 20:00 | Shelton 34' | Report | | Stadium: Ullevaal Stadion; Attendance: 15,004; Referee: Roy Helge Olsen |

| 2 October 2010 26 | Brann | 3–2 | Hønefoss | Bergen |
| 17:00 | Moen 15'; Mjelde 30'; Huseklepp 70' | Report | Lafton 77' (pen.); Olsen 84' | Stadium: Brann Stadion; Attendance: 14,901; Referee: Tom Henning Øvrebø |

| 17 October 2010 27 | Lillestrøm | 3–2 | Brann | Lillestrøm |
| 18:00 | Korcsmár 31' (o.g.); Ujah 37'; Kippe 40' | Report | Moen 60'; Huseklepp 69' | Stadium: Åråsen Stadion; Attendance: 6,800; Referee: Kristoffer Helgerud |

| 25 October 2010 28 | Brann | 3–1 | Kongsvinger | Bergen |
| 17:00 | Moen 20'; Huseklepp 29', 90' | Report | Risholt 79' | Stadium: Brann Stadion; Attendance: 12,052; Referee: Brage Sandmoen |

| 31 October 2010 29 | Aalesund | 3–1 | Brann | Ålesund |
| 18:00 | Mathisen 2', 45' (pen.); Herrera 31' (pen.) | Report | Guastavino 34' | Stadium: Color Line Stadion; Attendance: 10,759; Referee: Svein Oddvar Moen |

| 7 November 2010 30 | Brann | 1–1 | Odd Grenland | Bergen |
| 18:00 | Amankwah 90' | Report | Bentley 80' | Stadium: Brann Stadion; Attendance: 12,831; Referee: Tommy Skjerven |

==== Table ====
| Pos | Team | Pld | W | D | L | GF | GA | GD | Pts | Qualification or relegation |
|---|---|---|---|---|---|---|---|---|---|---|
| 11 | Molde | 30 | 10 | 10 | 10 | 42 | 45 | −3 | 40 | |
| 12 | Stabæk | 30 | 11 | 6 | 13 | 46 | 47 | −1 | 39 | |
| 13 | Brann | 30 | 8 | 10 | 12 | 48 | 50 | −2 | 34 | |
| 14 | Hønefoss (R) | 30 | 7 | 6 | 17 | 28 | 62 | −34 | 27 | Qualification for the relegation play-offs |
| 15 | Kongsvinger (R) | 30 | 4 | 8 | 18 | 27 | 58 | −31 | 20 | Relegation to First Division |

Source: fotball.no
Rules for classification: 1) points; 2) goal difference; 3) number of goals scored.
(R) Relegated

=== Norwegian Cup ===
| 13 May 2010 Round 1 | Arna-Bjørnar | 0–2 | Brann | Arna |
| 18:00 | | Report | Hansen 16'; Moen 72' | Stadium: Arna Stadion; Attendance: 1,766; Referee: Anders Bjerk Hansen |

| 19 May 2010 Round 2 | Fyllingen | 1–0 | Brann | Fyllingsdalen |
| 18:00 | Stephensen 55' | Report | | Stadium: Varden Amfi; Attendance: 3,000; Referee: Petter Toppe |

== Statistics ==
=== Appearances and goals ===
The table shows matches and goals in the Tippeligaen and Norwegian Cup, and was last updated after the game against Odd Grenland on November 7, 2010

| No. | Pos | Nat | Player | Total | | Tippeligaen | | Norwegian Cup | |
| No. | Pos | Nat | Player | Apps | Goals | Apps | Goals | Apps | Goals |
|---|---|---|---|---|---|---|---|---|---|
| 12 | GK | (Norway) NOR | Håkon Opdal | 30 | 0 | 30 | 0 | 0 | 0 |
| 24 | GK | (Norway) NOR | Kenneth Udjus | 2 | 0 | 0 | 0 | 2 | 0 |
| 2 | DF | (Iceland) ISL | Birkir Már Sævarsson | 28 | 2 | 27 | 2 | 1 | 0 |
| 3 | DF | (Norway) NOR | Christian Kalvenes | 11 | 0 | 11 | 0 | 0 | 0 |
| 5 | DF | (Jamaica) JAM | Rodolph Austin | 26 | 0 | 25 | 0 | 1 | 0 |
| 7 | DF | (Norway) NOR | Hassan El Fakiri | 27 | 0 | 24+1 | 0 | 2 | 0 |
| 18 | DF | (Iceland) ISL | Ólafur Örn Bjarnason | 13 | 0 | 9+2 | 0 | 2 | 0 |
| 21 | DF | (Hungary) HUN | Zsolt Korcsmár | 12 | 0 | 12 | 0 | 0 | 0 |
| 25 | DF | (Norway) NOR | Yaw Amankwah | 20 | 1 | 17+3 | 1 | 0 | 0 |
| 26 | DF | (Norway) NOR | Bjørnar Holmvik | 16 | 0 | 13+1 | 0 | 0+2 | 0 |
| 29 | DF | (Norway) NOR | Jonas Grønner | 2 | 0 | 0+0 | 0 | 2+0 | 0 |
| 4 | MF | (Norway) NOR | Cato Guntveit | 16 | 0 | 9+6 | 0 | 0+1 | 0 |
| 6 | MF | (Norway) NOR | Erik Mjelde | 30 | 4 | 27+2 | 4 | 1 | 0 |
| 8 | MF | (Iceland) ISL | Gylfi Einarsson | 6 | 0 | 1+4 | 0 | 1 | 0 |
| 9 | MF | (Norway) NOR | Jan Gunnar Solli | 23 | 2 | 18+3 | 2 | 1+1 | 0 |
| 11 | MF | (Norway) NOR | Petter Vaagan Moen | 31 | 15 | 28+1 | 14 | 0+2 | 1 |
| 14 | MF | (The Gambia) GAM | Tijan Jaiteh | 19 | 0 | 7+10 | 0 | 2 | 0 |
| 16 | MF | (Norway) NOR | Bjarte Haugsdal | 7 | 0 | 1+5 | 0 | 1 | 0 |
| 18 | MF | (Brazil) BRA | Diego | 1 | 0 | 0+1 | 0 | 0 | 0 |
| 31 | MF | (Norway) NOR | Kjetil Kalve | 1 | 0 | 0 | 0 | 1 | 0 |
| 10 | FW | (Denmark) DEN | David Nielsen | 10 | 0 | 1+9 | 0 | 0 | 0 |
| 13 | FW | (Norway) NOR | Erik Huseklepp | 31 | 10 | 30+0 | 10 | 1 | 0 |
| 15 | FW | (Uruguay) URU | Diego Guastavino | 26 | 9 | 19+5 | 9 | 2 | 0 |
| 17 | FW | (Norway) NOR | Eirik Bakke | 21 | 3 | 17+1 | 2 | 3+0 | 1 |
| 19 | FW | (Norway) NOR | Cato Hansen | 19 | 1 | 1+16 | 0 | 2 | 1 |
| 20 | FW | (Brazil) BRA | Juninho | 5 | 0 | 0+5 | 0 | 0 | 0 |

=== Top goalscorers ===
Includes all competitive matches. The list is sorted by shirt number when total goals are equal.

Last updated on 7 November 2010

| # | Nation | Shirt number | Name | Tippeligaen | Norwegian Cup | Total |
|---|---|---|---|---|---|---|
| 1 | (Norway) | 11 | Petter Vaagan Moen | 14 | 1 | 15 |
| 2 | (Norway) | 13 | Erik Huseklepp | 10 | 0 | 10 |
| 3 | (Uruguay) | 15 | Diego Guastavino | 9 | 0 | 9 |
| 4 | (Norway) | 6 | Erik Mjelde | 4 | 1 | 5 |
| = | (Norway) | 17 | Eirik Bakke | 5 | 0 | 5 |

=== Disciplinary record ===
Includes all competitive matches.

| # | Nation | Shirt number | Name | Tippeligaen | | Norwegian Cup | | Total | |
| # | Nation | Shirt number | Name | Booked | Sent off (straight red) | Booked | Sent off (straight red) | Booked | Sent off (straight red) |
| 1 | (Jamaica) | 5 | Rodolph Austin | 5 | 1 | 0 | 0 | 5 | 1 |
| 2 | (Iceland) | 2 | Birkir Sævarsson | 4 | 1 | 0 | 0 | 4 | 1 |
| 3 | (Norway) | 17 | Eirik Bakke | 7 | 0 | 0 | 0 | 7 | 0 |
| 4 | (Norway) | 11 | Petter Vaagan Moen | 6 | 0 | 0 | 0 | 6 | 0 |

=== Overall ===
| Games played | 32 (30 Tippeligaen, 2 Norwegian Cup) |
| Games won | 9 (8 Tippeligaen, 1 Norwegian Cup) |
| Games drawn | 10 (10 Tippeligaen) |
| Games lost | 13 (12 Tippeligaen, 1 Norwegian Cup) |
| Goals scored | 50 (48 Tippeligaen, 2 Norwegian Cup) |
| Goals conceded | 51 (50 Tippeligaen, 1 Norwegian Cup) |
| Goal difference | -1 (-2 Tippeligaen, +1 Norwegian Cup) |
| Yellow cards | 47 |
| Red cards | 2 |
| Worst discipline | (Jamaica) Rodolph Austin (5 (yellow card) , 1 (red card) ) |
| Best result | 4-0 (H) v Strømsgodset IF - Tippeligaen - 25 April 2010 |
| Worst result | 0-4 (A) v Viking FK - Tippeligaen - 21 March 2009 |
| Most appearances | 2 players with 31 appearances (Petter Vaagan Moen & Erik Huseklepp) |
| Top goalscorer | (Norway) Petter Vaagan Moen (15 goals) |
| Most assists | (Norway) Erik Huseklepp (10 assists) |
| League points | 34/90 (37.8%) |
