= Frédéric Injaï =

French footballer (born 1995)

Personal information
- Full name: Frédéric Injaï
- Date of birth: 9 November 1995 (age 30)
- Place of birth: Paris, France
- Height: 1.96 m (6 ft 5 in)
- Position: Defensive midfielder

Team information
- Current team: PSS Sleman
- Number: 10

Youth career
- 2011–2012: Nantes
- 2012–2014: Inter Milan

Senior career*
Years	Team	Apps	(Gls)
2014–2015	Saint-Étienne B	20	(0)
2017–2018	Titus Pétange	1	(0)
2018	Narbonne	10	(0)
2018–2019	Granville	4	(0)
2019	Istres	6	(0)
2019–2020	Saint-Malo	14	(1)
2020–2022	Villefranche	37	(3)
2022–2024	Cholet	28	(2)
2024–2025	Concarneau	19	(1)
2025–	PSS Sleman	24	(9)
- * Club domestic league appearances and goals as of 27 October 2026

Frédéric Injaï (born 9 November 1995) is a French professional footballer who plays as a defensive midfielder for Super League club PSS Sleman.

== Club career ==
Born in Paris, France, Injaï spent his early career in France at a young age with Nantes in 2011, the following season, he moved to Italy and joined Inter Milan, where he was assigned to Inter Milan’s Primavera team.

Following his departure from Inter Milan in 2014, Injaï returned to France to continue his professional development. He subsequently joined the reserve squad of Saint-Étienne. After his tenure at Saint-Étienne, Injaï moved to Luxembourg with joined Titus Pétange. He subsequently returned to the French football system, where he had stints with several clubs across the national divisions, including Narbonne, Granville, Istres, and Saint-Malo.

In July 2020, Championnat National club Villefranche announced an agreement to sign Injaï. He made his league debut on 21 August 2020 in a match against Lyon-La Duchère, coming as a starter and played full 90 minutes. On 11 September 2020, Injaï scored his first league for the club in a 0–2 away win against Red Star.

In June 2024, Injaï signed a year contract with Concarneau, previously he played for Cholet. On 16 August 2024, he scored his first league goal in his debut match against Paris 13 Atletico in a 2–0 home win.

=== PSS Sleman ===
On 13 July 2025, Injaï officially completed a transfer to Indonesian Championship club PSS Sleman, marking his first venture into Asian football following his extensive career in France, Italy, and Luxembourg. Injaï made his PSS debut in a pre-season friendly against Liga 1 club Persebaya Surabaya on 19 July 2025, and made his league debut on 15 September 2025 in a 2–1 home win against Persiba Balikpapan at the Maguwoharjo Stadium. Injaï scored his first league goals in a 0–3 away win over Persipal Palu, scoring a brace, on 5 October 2025.

== Honours ==
PSS Sleman

- Championship runner up: 2025–26
