= Everton (footballer, born 1993) =

Brazilian footballer

Personal information
- Full name: Everton Nascimento de Mendonça
- Date of birth: 3 July 1993 (age 33)
- Place of birth: Maceió, Brazil
- Height: 1.87 m (6 ft 2 in)
- Position: Striker

Team information
- Current team: Odisha

Senior career*
Years	Team	Apps	(Gls)
2014	Salgueiro	8	(5)
2015	ASA	13	(7)
2015	Bucheon FC 1995	2	(1)
2016–2017	Manama Club	22	(16)
2017–2019	Marítimo	22	(12)
2019–2020	Al-Muharraq	25	(14)
2020–2021	Al-Adalah	37	(22)
2021–2022	Al-Hidd	17	(8)
2022–2023	PSM Makassar	46	(9)
2024	Nejmeh	9	(4)
2024–2025	Bali United	25	(5)
2025–2026	Garudayaksa	24	(14)
2026–	Odisha	2	(0)
- * Club domestic league appearances and goals as of 17 October 2026

Everton Nascimento de Mendonça (born 3 July 1993), simply known as Everton, is a Brazilian professional footballer who plays as a striker for Indian Super League club Odisha.

== Career ==
=== Marítimo ===
On 3 July 2017, Everton signed a four-year contract with the Portuguese Primeira Liga club Marítimo.

=== Al-Muharraq ===
Everton moved to Bahrain on 22 January 2019, where he signed with Al-Muharraq.

=== PSM Makassar ===
He was signed for PSM Makassar to play in Liga 1 in the 2022 season. Everton made his league debut on 23 July 2022 in a match against PSS Sleman at the Maguwoharjo Stadium, Sleman.

== Honours ==
PSM Makassar

- Liga 1: 2022–23

Nejmeh

- Lebanese Premier League: 2023–24

Garudayaksa

- Championship: 2025–26
