= Kevin Gomes =

Indonesian footballer (born 1998)

Personal information
- Full name: Kevin Gomes de Oliveira
- Date of birth: 24 June 1998 (age 28)
- Place of birth: Surabaya, Indonesia
- Height: 1.82 m (6 ft 0 in)
- Position: Left-back

Team information
- Current team: PSS Sleman
- Number: 6

Youth career
- 2018: Copinha

Senior career*
Years	Team	Apps	(Gls)
2018–2019	Araxá	12	(0)
2019–2020	Kalteng Putra	26	(0)
2020–2021	Borneo	3	(0)
2021–2022	Persita Tangerang	15	(0)
2022	Persis Solo	0	(0)
2023–	PSS Sleman	74	(2)
- * Club domestic league appearances and goals as of 9 May 2026

Kevin Gomes de Oliveira (born 24 June 1998) is an Indonesian professional footballer who plays as a left-back for Championship club PSS Sleman.

== Club career ==
=== Kalteng Putra ===
In the 2019 season, he joined Indonesian Liga 1 club, Kalteng Putra and made his debut against Persebaya Surabaya.

=== Borneo ===
In the 2020 season, he joined Indonesian Liga 1 club, Borneo and made his debut against Persija Jakarta. This season was suspended on 27 March 2020 due to the COVID-19 pandemic. The season was abandoned and was declared void on 20 January 2021.

=== Persita Tangerang ===
He was signed for Persita Tangerang to play in Liga 1 in the 2021 season. Kevin made his debut on 17 September 2021 in a match against Persela Lamongan at the Pakansari Stadium, Cibinong.

=== Persis Solo ===
Gomes was signed for Persis Solo to play in Liga 1 in the 2022–23 season.

=== PSS Sleman ===
On 23 January 2023, Kevin signed a contract with Liga 1 club PSS Sleman from Persis Solo. Kevin made his league debut for the club in a 2–0 win against Arema, coming on as a substituted Haris Tuharea.

== Career statistics ==
=== Club ===
As of match played 10 January 2026

Club	Season	League			Cup		Continental		Other (Note: Appearances in Indonesia President's Cup)		Total	
Club	Season	Division	Apps	Goals	Apps	Goals	Apps	Goals	Apps	Goals	Apps	Goals
Kalteng Putra	2019	Liga 1	26	0	0	0	–		4	0	30	0
Borneo	2020	Liga 1	3	0	0	0	–		0	0	3	0
Persita Tangerang	2021–22	Liga 1	15	0	0	0	–		2 (Note: Appearances in Menpora Cup)	0	17	0
Persis Solo	2022–23	Liga 1	0	0	0	0	–		4	0	4	0
PSS Sleman	2022–23	Liga 1	9	0	0	0	–		0	0	9	0
PSS Sleman	2023–24	Liga 1	9	1	0	0	–		0	0	9	1
PSS Sleman	2024–25	Liga 1	30	1	0	0	–		0	0	30	1
PSS Sleman	2025–26	Championship	12	0	0	0	–		0	0	12	0
Career total			104	2	0	0	0	0	10	0	114	2

== Personal life ==
Kevin is the son of the legend of Persebaya Surabaya, Gomes de Oliveira, and is eligible to represent Brazil internationally through his father.

== Honours ==
PSS Sleman

- Championship runner up: 2025–26
