= Risqki Putra Utomo =

Indonesian footballer

Risqki Utomo
Personal information
- Full name: Risqki Putra Utomo
- Date of birth: 5 November 1998 (age 28)
- Place of birth: Lamongan, Indonesia
- Height: 1.66 m (5 ft 5 in)
- Position: Forward

Team information
- Current team: Persela Lamongan
- Number: 80

Youth career
- 2017: Lamongan FC
- 2018–2020: Persela Lamongan

Senior career*
| Years | Team | Apps | (Gls) |
| 2020–2023 | Persela Lamongan | 38 | (2) |
| 2020 | → PSG Pati (loan) | 0 | (0) |
| 2024–2026 | Persipal Palu | 27 | (7) |
| 2026– | Persela Lamongan | 9 | (5) |
- * Club domestic league appearances and goals as of 3 May 2026

Risqki Putra Utomo (born 5 November 1998) is an Indonesian professional footballer who plays as a forward for Championship club Persela Lamongan.

== Club career ==
=== Persela Lamongan ===
He was signed for Persela Lamongan to play in Liga 1 in the 2021 season. Risqki made his first-team debut on 10 September 2021 in a match against Persipura Jayapura at the Wibawa Mukti Stadium, Cikarang.

==== PSG Pati (loan) ====
He was signed for PSG Pati to play in Liga 2 in the 2020 season. This season was suspended on 27 March 2020 due to the COVID-19 pandemic. The season was abandoned and was declared void on 20 January 2021.

== Career statistics ==
=== Club ===
As of 3 May 2026

| Club | Season | League | | | Cup | | Continental | | Other | | Total | |
| Club | Season | Division | Apps | Goals | Apps | Goals | Apps | Goals | Apps | Goals | Apps | Goals |
|---|---|---|---|---|---|---|---|---|---|---|---|---|
| Persela Lamongan | 2020 | Liga 1 | 0 | 0 | 0 | 0 | – | | 0 | 0 | 0 | 0 |
| Persela Lamongan | 2021 | Liga 1 | 23 | 0 | 0 | 0 | – | | 0 | 0 | 23 | 0 |
| Persela Lamongan | 2022 | Liga 2 | 7 | 2 | 0 | 0 | – | | 0 | 0 | 7 | 2 |
| Persela Lamongan | 2023–24 | Liga 2 | 8 | 0 | 0 | 0 | – | | 0 | 0 | 8 | 0 |
| PSG Pati (loan) | 2020 | Liga 2 | 0 | 0 | 0 | 0 | – | | 0 | 0 | 0 | 0 |
| Persipal Palu | 2024–25 | Liga 2 | 10 | 3 | 0 | 0 | – | | 0 | 0 | 10 | 3 |
| Persipal Palu | 2025–26 | Championship | 17 | 4 | 0 | 0 | – | | 0 | 0 | 17 | 4 |
| Persela Lamongan | 2025–26 | Championship | 9 | 5 | 0 | 0 | – | | 0 | 0 | 9 | 5 |
| Career total | | | 74 | 14 | 0 | 0 | 0 | 0 | 0 | 0 | 74 | 14 |
