= Igor Henrique (footballer, born 1998) =

Brazilian footballer (born 1998)

Personal information
- Full name: Igor Henrique da Silva Costa
- Date of birth: 2 May 1998 (age 28)
- Place of birth: Marília, Brazil
- Height: 1.83 m (6 ft 0 in)
- Position: Striker

Team information
- Current team: Duhok SC
- Number: 77

Youth career
- Marília

Senior career*
Years	Team	Apps	(Gls)
2017–2018	Santacruzense	9	(5)
2019–2021	União Almeirim	35	(24)
2021–2022	Sernache	13	(1)
2022–2023	Oliveira de Frades	9	(2)
2023–2024	Alcains	26	(42)
2024–2025	Victoria Wanderers	17	(20)
2025–2026	Persiku Kudus	23	(21)
2026–	Duhok SC	5	(3)
- * Club domestic league appearances and goals as of 8 September 2026

Igor Henrique da Silva Costa (born 2 May 1998) is a Brazilian professional footballer who plays as a striker for Iraq Stars League club Duhok SC.

== Club career ==
Born in Marília, Brazil, Henrique spent his early career in Brazil at a young age with Marília and Santacruzense, he decided to go abroad for the first time to Portugal with joined União Almeirim in 2019.

=== Victoria Wanderers ===
He went to Malta and joined the Gozo Football League club Victoria Wanderers in the 2024–25 season. On 7 September 2024, he scored his first league goal in his debut match against Qala Saints despite losing 3–1. On 23 March 2025, Henrique scored his first Wanderers hat-trick in a 6–0 away win over Oratory Youths. The 2024–25 season was Henrique's most prolific in his Wanderers career, as he scored 22 goals in 22 games in all competitions.

=== Persiku Kudus ===
In August 2025, Henrique moved to Asia and signed a contract with Indonesian Championship club Persiku Kudus. On 14 September 2025, he scored his first league goal in his debut match with scored hat-trick in a 0–4 away win against PSIS Semarang. On 17 October 2025, Henrique scored the opening goal in a 1–1 draw over Persipal Palu. On 11 November 2025, he scored another hat-trick in a 3–0 home win against PSIS Semarang at the Wergu Wetan Stadium. On 17 November 2025, he captained his team for the first time, in a league match against PSS Sleman, scored in a 1–2 lose.
