= Adilson Silva (footballer) =

Portuguese footballer (born 1997)

Personal information
- Full name: Adilson Gancho Silva
- Date of birth: 30 July 1997 (age 29)
- Place of birth: Évora, Portugal
- Height: 1.86 m (6 ft 1 in)
- Position: Forward

Team information
- Current team: Isenmulang Kalteng
- Number: 7

Youth career
- 2015–2017: Juventude de Évora

Senior career*
Years	Team	Apps	(Gls)
2015–2016	Juventude de Évora	14	(0)
2017–2018	Mafra	4	(0)
2018	Oleiros	10	(0)
2018–2019	Vasco da Gama Vidigueira	27	(8)
2019–2020	Leça	23	(8)
2020–2022	Trofense	24	(3)
2022	→ Gondomar (loan)	19	(4)
2022–2023	Real	23	(10)
2023–2025	PSM Makassar	46	(8)
2025	→ Persekat Tegal (loan)	10	(2)
2025–	Isenmulang Kalteng	29	(26)
- * Club domestic league appearances and goals as of 19 September 2026

Adilson Gancho Silva (born 30 July 1997) is a Portuguese professional footballer who plays as a forward for Super League club Isenmulang Kalteng.

== Club career ==
=== Real SC ===
In the 2022–23 season, Adilson signed a contract with Real SC. He made his league debut on 28 August 2022 as a substitute in a 0–1 lost over Belenenses. He scored his first league goal for Real SC in a 2–1 lose over Amora on 4 September 2022.

=== PSM Makassar ===
Ahead of the 2023–24 season, he went abroad for the first time and signed a contract with Indonesian Liga 1 club PSM Makassar. Adilson made his club debut on 6 June 2023 as a substituted in a 1–1 draw over Bali United in the play-offs for qualification to the AFC Club Competition. And made his league debut on 3 July 2023 in a 1–1 draw against Persija Jakarta at the Gelora Bung Karno Stadium. On 23 August, Adilson scored a brace in a 4–0 win against Yangon United in the 2023–24 AFC Cup qualifying play-offs.

== Honours ==
Trofense

- Campeonato de Portugal: 2020–21

Individual

- Championship Top Scorer: 2025–26
