= Luan Sérgio =

Brazilian footballer

Personal information
- Full name: Luan Sérgio Nascimento Dias de Almeida
- Date of birth: 18 August 1994 (age 32)
- Place of birth: Rio de Janeiro, Brazil
- Height: 1.77 m (5 ft 10 in)
- Position: Midfielder

Team information
- Current team: Persela Lamongan
- Number: 8

Youth career
- 2010–2014: Flamengo

Senior career*
Years	Team	Apps	(Gls)
2015–2016	Bangu	3	(0)
2016–2019	Limianos	72	(12)
2019–2023	Montalegre	101	(3)
2023–2024	Canelas	24	(2)
2024	Naxxar Lions	13	(1)
2025	Qala Saints	10	(5)
2025–2026	PSIS Semarang	9	(1)
2026–	Persela Lamongan	10	(0)
- * Club domestic league appearances and goals as of 3 May 2026

Luan Sérgio Nascimento Dias de Almeida (born 18 August 1994) is a Brazilian professional footballer who plays as a midfielder for Championship club Persela Lamongan.

== Career ==
He made his professional debut in the Campeonato Carioca for Bangu on 14 February 2016 in a game against Bonsucesso.

After a long career in Portugal and a brief stint in Malta, Luan moved to Indonesia in 2025 to join PSIS Semarang. In January 2026, he signed with Persela Lamongan for the second half of the 2025–26 Liga 2 season, replacing Jonathan Bustos under head coach Bima Sakti.
