= Daniel Gonçalves (footballer) =

Brazilian footballer (born 1996)

Personal information
- Full name: Daniel Gonçalves
- Date of birth: 4 March 1996 (age 30)
- Place of birth: Queimados, Brazil
- Height: 1.88 m (6 ft 2 in)
- Position: Centre-back

Team information
- Current team: Persela Lamongan
- Number: 20

Youth career
- Cruzeiro
- 2015: Vasco da Gama

Senior career*
Years	Team	Apps	(Gls)
2016–2017	Esportivo	9	(0)
2017	Nova Iguaçu	3	(0)
2019–2020	Americano	8	(2)
2020–2021	Duque de Caxias	26	(3)
2021	Sampaio Corrêa	10	(0)
2021–2023	Nacional	10	(1)
2023	Falcon	17	(1)
2023–2025	Shillong Lajong	44	(7)
2025–	Persela Lamongan	29	(1)
- * Club domestic league appearances and goals as of 27 September 2026

Daniel Gonçalves (born 4 March 1996), is a Brazilian professional footballer who plays as a centre-back for Championship club Persela Lamongan.

== Club career ==
Born in Queimados, Rio de Janeiro, Brazil, Gonçalves represented Cruzeiro and Vasco da Gama as a youth. He played at the senior club level with Esportivo in 2016. A year later, he joined Série D club Nova Iguaçu. However, his career stalled after he became a free agent in April 2018. In November 2019, he joined Americano, where he was tasked with strengthening Americano in the 2020 Campeonato Carioca, his debut season saw him score 2 goals in 8 appearances, totaling 636 minutes of playing time. Gonçalves subsequently represented Duque de Caxias, and Sampaio Corrêa before signing with Nacional in December 2021 in preparation for the 2022 Campeonato Amazonense.

In December 2022, Gonçalves joined Série D club Falcon. He made his league debut on 21 May 2023, coming on as a starter in a 0–1 home lose against Sergipe.

He moved abroad for the first time in his career, after agreeing to a contract with Indian Football League club Shillong Lajong in September 2023. He made his league debut on 3 November 2023, as starting line-up, which ended 1–1 draw against Mohammedan. On 19 November 2023, he scored his first league goal for Shillong Lajong against Gokulam Kerala, opening the scoring in a 3–1 win at SSA Stadium, the match unfolded with an early lead for Shillong as Goncalves headed in a precise free-kick from skipper Hardy Nongbri in the 29th minute. He emerged the saviour for Shillong Lajong as the defender's last-minute goal helped his side secure a 1–1 draw in the 2023–24 I-League match against Rajasthan United at the Deccan Arena on 3 December 2023.

In June 2025, Gonçalves moved to Indonesia and signed with Championship club Persela Lamongan ahead of the 2025–26 season.
