= Caíque Souza =

Brazilian footballer (born 1999)

Personal information
- Full name: Caíque Silvio Souza da Silva
- Date of birth: 13 January 1999 (age 27)
- Place of birth: Santo Antônio de Jesus, Brazil
- Height: 1.68 m (5 ft 6 in)
- Position: Winger

Team information
- Current team: Persela Lamongan
- Number: 10

Youth career
- Vitória

Senior career*
Years	Team	Apps	(Gls)
2019–2022	Vitória	27	(1)
2022	Campinense	4	(0)
2022–2023	Juazeirense	2	(0)
2023	Atlético de Alagoinhas	1	(0)
2023	Galícia	3	(0)
2023–2024	Victoria Wanderers	20	(13)
2024	Gyeongju KHNP	10	(0)
2025	Victoria Wanderers	16	(8)
2026	Persiku Kudus	10	(5)
2026–	Persela Lamongan	3	(1)
- * Club domestic league appearances and goals as of 27 September 2026

Caíque Silvio Souza da Silva (born 13 January 1999) is a Brazilian professional footballer who plays as a winger for Championship club Persela Lamongan.

== Club career ==
Caíque began his professional career with Vitória, making his debut in 2019. During his time with the club, he primarily featured in the Campeonato Brasileiro Série B and the Campeonato Baiano, making 38 appearances and scoring 2 goals over three seasons in all competitions. In 2022, he moved to Campinense, followed by brief stints at Juazeirense, Atlético de Alagoinhas, and Galícia in the lower divisions of Brazilian football.

In late 2023, Caíque moved abroad to join Maltese side Victoria Wanderers, competing in the Gozo Football League. In 2024, he signed a contract with the K3 League club Gyeongju KHNP. He returned to Victoria Wanderers for the 2025 season, maintaining his scoring form with 8 goals in 16 league matches.

In January 2026, Caíque signed for Indonesian club Persiku Kudus to compete in the 2025–26 Championship. He was recruited alongside fellow Brazilian defender Jaime Xavier to bolster the team's attacking options for the remainder of the 2025–26 season. He made his club debut on 25 January 2026 against Kendal Tornado, playing as a starter in a 0–0 draw. On 30 January 2026, Caíque scored his first goal for the club with a long-range free kick in a 1–2 home defeat against Persipura Jayapura at the Wergu Wetan Stadium.
