= Camilo Sánchez =

Colombian footballer (born 1998)

Personal information
- Full name: Camilo Andrés Sánchez González
- Date of birth: 12 August 1998 (age 28)
- Place of birth: Barranquilla, Colombia
- Height: 1.87 m (6 ft 2 in)
- Position: Forward

Team information
- Current team: Charleston Battery
- Number: 9

Senior career*
Years	Team	Apps	(Gls)
2022–2023	Sannat Lions	19	(5)
2023–2024	Luqa St. Andrew's	25	(11)
2024	Abu Salim	0	(0)
2025	Melita	14	(2)
2025	PSIS Semarang	11	(1)
2026–	Charleston Battery	6	(1)
- * Club domestic league appearances and goals as of 12:16, 4 November 2026 (UTC)

Camilo Andrés Sánchez González (born 12 August 1998) is a Colombian professional footballer who plays as a forward for USL Championship club Charleston Battery.

== Career ==
Born in Barranquilla, Colombia, Sánchez spent his early career in Malta and Libya with Sannat Lions, Luqa St. Andrew's, and Abu Salim.

In January 2025, he returned to Malta, signing with Melita of the Maltese Premier League. Sánchez made his club debut on 18 January 2025, in a 2–0 win to Floriana in the 2024–25 Maltese Premier League Closing Round. On 2 February 2025, he scored his first league goal for Melita in the 45th minute of a 2–2 draw against Gzira United. He scored his second league goal for the club on 1 March 2025, opening the scoring in a 1–1 draw against Balzan at Victor Tedesco Stadium.

=== PSIS Semarang ===
On 29 July 2025, PSIS Semarang brought in Sánchez ahead of the 2025–26 Championship competition.

=== Charleston Battery ===
On 2 September 2026, Charleston Battery announced they had signed Sánchez to a contract for the remainder of the 2026 USL Championship season.

== Career statistics ==
As of 23 November 2025

Club	Season	League			Cup		Other		Total	
Club	Season	Division	Apps	Goals	Apps	Goals	Apps	Goals	Apps	Goals
Sannat Lions	2022–23	Gozo Football League First Division	19	5	1	1	0	0	20	6
Luqa St. Andrew's	2023–24	Maltese Challenge League	25	11	–		0	0	25	11
Melita	2024–25	Maltese Premier League	14	2	–		0	0	14	2
PSIS Semarang	2025–26	Championship	11	1	–		0	0	11	1
Career total			69	19	1	1	0	0	70	20
