= Gustavo Tocantins =

Brazilian footballer (born 1996)

Personal information
- Full name: Gustavo Henrique Barbosa Freire
- Date of birth: 11 January 1996 (age 30)
- Place of birth: Gurupi, Brazil
- Height: 1.79 m (5 ft 10 in)
- Position: Forward

Team information
- Current team: PSS Sleman
- Number: 11

Youth career
- 2009–2011: Olé Brasil
- 2011–2016: Corinthians

Senior career*
Years	Team	Apps	(Gls)
2014–2016	Corinthians	4	(0)
2015	→ Bragantino (loan)	2	(0)
2016	→ Portuguesa (loan)	2	(1)
2016–2018	Estoril	27	(3)
2018	→ Londrina (loan)	0	(0)
2018–2020	Vilafranquense	36	(8)
2020–2021	Torreense	24	(5)
2021	São João Ver	5	(1)
2022	Anadia	14	(4)
2022–2023	Persikabo 1973	17	(6)
2023–2024	Barito Putera	49	(21)
2024–	PSS Sleman	61	(40)
- * Club domestic league appearances and goals as of 4 September 2026

Gustavo Henrique Barbosa Freire (born 11 January 1996), commonly known as Gustavo Tocantins, is a Brazilian professional footballer who plays as a forward for Championship club PSS Sleman.

== Club career ==
=== Corinthians ===
Gustavo Tocantins is a youth exponent from Corinthians. He made his Série A debut at 11 October 2014 against Botafogo.

Tocantins was loaned to Bragantino on 27 April 2015. He made his debut for the team at the Série B against CRB on May 10. Tocantins also played against Bahia on June 6, before being called back to Corinthians on June 12.

In February 2016, Tocantins was loaned to Portuguesa. He was the club's top goalscorer in Campeonato Paulista Série A2 with six goals.

=== Estoril ===
In June 2016, Tocantins moved abroad and signed for Portuguese Primeira Liga club Estoril.

== Honours ==
PSS Sleman

- Liga 2 runner up: 2025–26

Individual

- Liga 2 Best Player: 2025–26
- Liga 2 Team of the Season: 2025–26
