= Vicente Concha =

Chilean footballer (born 2002)

Personal information
- Full name: Vicente Antonio Concha Razzouk
- Date of birth: 11 March 2002 (age 24)
- Place of birth: Osorno, Chile
- Height: 1.94 m (6 ft 4 in)
- Position: Centre-back

Team information
- Current team: Deportes Iquique
- Number: 5

Youth career
- –2020: Unión Española

Senior career*
Years	Team	Apps	(Gls)
2021–2024	Deportes Temuco	53	(2)
2025	Ponte Preta	6	(0)
2025	Garudayaksa	15	(4)
2026–	Deportes Iquique	6	(0)
- * Club domestic league appearances and goals as of 3 May 2026

Vicente Antonio Concha Razzouk (born 11 March 2002) is a Chilean professional footballer who plays as a centre-back for Campeonato Nacional Primera B club Deportes Iquique.

== Club career ==
Born in Osorno, Chile, Concha is a youth product of Unión Española. In 2021, he joined Deportes Temuco in Primera B de Chile. He made his professional debut on 15 June 2021 against Deportes Iberia in the 2021 Copa Chile. On 24 August, he made his league debut in a 1–1 draw against San Luis de Quillota.

On 11 April 2022, he scored his first professional goal in a 3–2 away loss to Rangers de Talca.

At the end of the 2024 season, Concha did not renew his contract with the team. In January 2025, he was announced as a new player for Brazilian club Ponte Preta in Série C. On 24 May, he made his league debut against Náutico in a 1–0 victory.

In August 2025, Concha signed with newly established Indonesian club Garudayaksa.

Back to Chile, Concha joined Deportes Iquique.
