= Juninho Cabral =

Brazilian footballer

Personal information
- Full name: Jacinto Júnior Conceição Cabral
- Date of birth: 10 March 1992 (age 34)
- Place of birth: Laguna Carapã, Brazil
- Height: 1.80 m (5 ft 11 in)
- Position: Forward

Team information
- Current team: Persela Lamongan
- Number: 9

Youth career
- Desportivo Brasil

Senior career*
Years	Team	Apps	(Gls)
2010–2012	Desportivo Brasil	3	(1)
2010–2011	→ Brann (loan)	5	(0)
2012	Fyllingsdalen	19	(12)
2013–2014	Araxá	3	(0)
2014	Naviraiense	1	(0)
2014–2015	Botafogo-PB	10	(0)
2015–2019	Floriana	54	(15)
2016–2017	→ Senglea Athletic (loan)	22	(25)
2019	FK Rabotnički	5	(1)
2020	Senglea Athletic	5	(2)
2020–2021	Marsaxlokk	4	(3)
2021	Shukura Kobuleti	18	(0)
2022–2023	Tarxien Rainbows	19	(8)
2023–2024	Victoria Wanderers	20	(10)
2024–2025	PSMS Medan	22	(15)
2025–2026	Sumsel United	26	(14)
2026–	Persela Lamongan	3	(3)
- * Club domestic league appearances and goals as of 27 September 2026

Jacinto Júnior Conceição Cabral (born 10 March 1992), commonly known as Juninho Cabral or just Juninho, is a Brazilian professional footballer who plays as a forward for Championship club Persela Lamongan.

== Playing career ==
=== SK Brann ===
Together with his friend and compatriot Diego, he was brought to Norwegian club SK Brann in the summer of 2010 after previously having been on trial with the club. He made his debut for the first team of 30 August 2010. Despite failing to make an impact in his first year for Brann, manager Rune Skarsfjord said he wanted to extend Juninho's loan for another six months. On 26 January 2011, Brann did sign Juninho on a six-month loan with an option to purchase the player after the time.

=== FK Fyllingsdalen ===
The loan spell ended in 2011. In 2012, he joined another club from Bergen in Norway, FK Fyllingsdalen. He became the only professional full-time footballer in the third-tier club. He made his debut as a substitute on 12 May 2012. In 2013, he joined Araxá Esporte Clube.

=== Senglea Athletic ===
Juninho Carbal re-signed for Maltese Premier League side Senglea Athletic on a six-month deal on 14 January 2020.

=== FC Shukura Kobuleti ===
Juninho left Maltese First Division side Marsaxlokk to sign for Erovnuli Liga side FC Shukura Kobuleti on 13 January 2021.
