= Ansyari Lubis =

Indonesian footballer

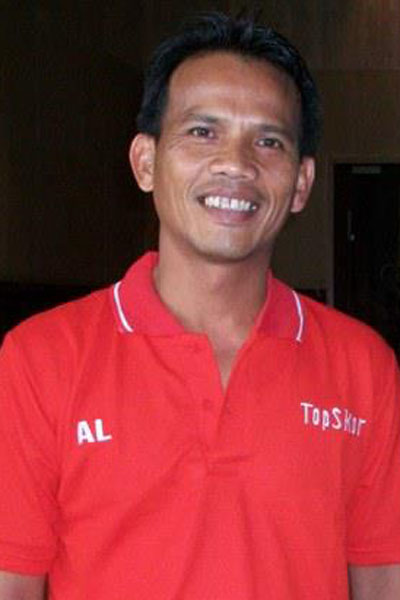

Personal information
- Full name: Ansyari Lubis
- Date of birth: 29 July 1970 (age 56)
- Place of birth: Tebing Tinggi, Indonesia
- Height: 1.65 m (5 ft 5 in)
- Position: Midfielder

Team information
- Current team: PSS Sleman (head coach)

Senior career*
Years	Team	Apps	(Gls)
1989–1993	Medan Jaya	90	(33)
1993–2002	Pelita Jaya		
2003	Persib Bandung		
2003–2009	PSDS Deli Serdang		
2009–2010	PSGS Gayo Lues		
2010–2012	Pro Duta F.C.		

International career
1995–1997	Indonesia	30	(8)

Managerial career
- 2010–2013: Pro Duta F.C. (assistant)
- 2013–2015: Pro Duta F.C.
- 2016–2017: PSMS Medan (assistant)
- 2017–2018: Aceh United
- 2018: PSPS Riau
- 2018–2019: PSDS Deli Serdang
- 2019–2020: Karo United
- 2021: PSMS Medan (assistant)
- 2021: PSMS Medan
- 2022–2025: PSS Sleman (assistant)
- 2025–2026: PSS Sleman
- 2026–: PSS Sleman (assistant)
- * Club domestic league appearances and goals

Ansyari Lubis (born 29 July 1970 in Tebing Tinggi, Sumatera Utara) is an Indonesian former football player and head coach for Super League club PSS Sleman.

== Club career ==
His transfer fee from Medan Jaya to Pelita Jaya was over Rp 25.000.000.

== International career ==
He formerly played for the Indonesia national football team in the 1990s. He participated in international events with Senior National Team at the Pre Olympic, Kemerdekaan Cup and the Sea Games.

Lubis made 29 appearances for the Indonesia national football team from 1995 to 1997.

== Honours ==
Pelita Jaya

- Galatama: 1993–94

Indonesia

- SEA Games silver medal: 1997
