= Matheus Silva =

Matheus Silva may refer to:

- Matheus Silva (footballer, born 1996), Brazilian football defender
- Matheus Silva (footballer, born June 1997), Brazilian football forward
- Matheus Silva (footballer, born October 1997), Brazilian football rightback
- Matheus Silva (futsal player), Brazilian futsal player
- Matheus da Silva (born 2000), Brazilian football midfielder
