= Kim Jeung-ho =

South Korean footballer (born 1995)

Personal information
- Date of birth: 31 May 1995 (age 31)
- Place of birth: Incheon, South Korea
- Height: 1.88 m (6 ft 2 in)
- Position: Defender

Team information
- Current team: Gyeongju KHNP
- Number: 44

Youth career
- 2007–2008: Uiwang Jeongwoo

Senior career*
Years	Team	Apps	(Gls)
2008–2010	Cheonho MS	2	(0)
2010–2013	Thongjing HS	11	(2)
2013–2017	Incheon Uni	10	(1)
2017–2020	Incheon United	48	(1)
2021–2022	Bucheon FC 1995	39	(0)
2023–2024	Ansan Greeners	31	(1)
2025–2026	PSMS Medan	25	(1)
2026–	Gyeongju KHNP	0	(0)

International career
2014–2017	South Korea U23	26	(0)
- * Club domestic league appearances and goals as of 2 May 2026

Kim Jeung-ho (Korean: 김정호; born 31 May 1995) is a South Korea professional footballer who plays as a defender for Gyeongju KHNP.

== Career ==
Born in Incheon, South Korea, Kim began his professional career with the South Korean club Incheon United in 2017 and later played for Bucheon FC 1995 in 2020. He decided to go abroad for the first time to Indonesia, joining PSMS Medan. Before coming to Indonesia, he played for Ansan Greeners, where Kim appeared in a total of 64 games, scoring 1 goal and providing 2 assists. On 12 September 2025, Kim made his league debut for PSMS Medan in a home match against Persekat Tegal, which ended in a 0–1 loss. He was in the starting lineup and played the full 90 minutes. Kim scored his first goal for PSMS on 28 September 2025 against Sumsel United, via a long range free kick in the 24th minute of the game. He was also appointed the captain for the first time in this match, which PSMS won 2-0.
