= Diego (footballer, born 1992) =

Brazilian footballer

Personal information
- Full name: Diego Henrique Pachega de Souza
- Date of birth: 20 April 1992 (age 34)
- Place of birth: Piracicaba, Brazil
- Height: 1.78 m (5 ft 10 in)
- Position: Left winger

Team information
- Current team: Desportivo Brasil

Senior career*
Years	Team	Apps	(Gls)
2010–	Desportivo Brasil		
2010	→ Brann (loan)	1	(0)
- * Club domestic league appearances and goals as of 26 September 2010

Diego Henrique Pachega de Souza, also known as Diego, is a Brazilian footballer who currently plays for the Brazilian club Desportivo Brasil. In 2010, he was on loan at SK Brann in the Norwegian Premier League.
