= Persela Lamongan =

Association football team in Indonesia

- Full name: Persatuan Sepakbola Lamongan
- Nicknames: Laskar Joko Tingkir (Joko Tingkir Warriors); Lele Glagah (Glagah Catfish)
- Short name: PLA; PSLA; LAM; PSL
- Founded: 18 April 1967; 59 years ago
- Ground: Surajaya Stadium
- Capacity: 12,097
- Owner: PT Persela Jaya
- Business Director: Pradita Aditya
- Head coach: Bima Sakti
- League: Championship
- 2024–25: Liga 2/Championship Round (Group Y), 4th
- Website: www.perselalamongan.com
| Home colours | Away colours |

Persatuan Sepakbola Lamongan, commonly known as Persela, is an Indonesian professional football club based in Lamongan, East Java. Currently the club plays in Championship, the second tier of domestic football.

== History ==
Although it has been established since 18 April 1967, Persela did not have major results at the beginning. Before 2003, Persela used to play in the lower divisions, before playing in the Super League.

On 15 October 2017, Choirul Huda died from the injuries sustained during a match against Semen Padang in a Liga 1 match.

In the winter of 2017, Englishman Judan Ali was signed on a 2-year contract as their first foreign technical director.

=== Crest history ===
Crest until 2009

Current crest

== Players ==
=== Current squad ===
As of September 2026

Note: Flags indicate national team as defined under FIFA eligibility rules; some limited exceptions apply. Players may hold more than one non-FIFA nationality.

| No. | Pos. | Nation | Player |
|---|---|---|---|
| 7 | MF | IDN | Hambali Tolib |
| 8 | MF | IDN | Haikal Riza |
| 9 | FW | BRA | Juninho Cabral |
| 10 | FW | BRA | Caíque Souza |
| 12 | MF | IDN | Hendro Siswanto (captain) |
| 15 | DF | IDN | Yoga Pratama |
| 17 | MF | IDN | Ruy Arianto |
| 18 | DF | IDN | Indra Rianto |
| 19 | FW | IDN | Adam Malik |
| 20 | DF | BRA | Daniel Gonçalves |
| 21 | GK | IDN | Rafli Mahreza |
| 22 | FW | IDN | Dendy Sulistyawan |
| 23 | MF | IDN | Fajar Az-Zahir |
| 25 | MF | IDN | Naufal Ahnaf |

| No. | Pos. | Nation | Player |
|---|---|---|---|
| 27 | GK | IDN | Eko Saputro |
| 29 | DF | IDN | Muhammad Syukron |
| 30 | GK | IDN | Leonel Sasmita |
| 50 | DF | IDN | Shobrian Widyansyah |
| 56 | DF | IDN | Ifan Nanda Pratama |
| 57 | DF | IDN | Rafiud Drajat |
| 64 | MF | IDN | Zidan Arrosyid |
| 71 | MF | IDN | Affani Ubaidillah |
| 78 | DF | IDN | Hadi Ardiansyah |
| 80 | FW | IDN | Risqki Putra Utomo |
| 90 | GK | IDN | Aryandy Widiansyah |
| 99 | FW | IDN | Kushedya Hari Yudo |

== Retired number ==
- 1 – Choirul Huda, goalkeeper, 1999–2017

As a tribute to the late goalkeeper, Persela retired Huda's number 1 shirt after his death. Huda's loyalty to the club is unquestionable. From 1999 to 2017, he has never played with any other club except Persela.

Huda died after an incident in the match against Semen Padang at Liga 1 match week 29. He collided with a teammate, Ramon Rodrigues, while trying to collect the ball from an opponent and was struck in the chest. Paramedics immediately gave him sideline emergency treatment. A paramedic said that after the incident, he was still conscious and complained of a chest pain, but his condition soon relapsed and he later died from his injuries in a local hospital.

According to a doctor in the local hospital, he suffered from collision on his chest and lower jaw, which caused hypoxia that ultimately led to his death. Moreover, due to severe injury, he might also have experienced trauma to his head, neck, and chest.

== Coaching staff ==
| Position | Name |
|---|---|
| Head coach | (Indonesia) Bima Sakti |
| Assistant coach | (Indonesia) Ragil Sudirman |
| Fitness coach | (Indonesia) Abda Alief |
| Goalkeeper coach | (Indonesia) Yanuar Hermansyah |
| Analyst | (Indonesia) Herwan Jabrig |

== Season-by-season records ==
| Season(s) | League/Division | Tms. | Pos. | Piala Indonesia | I-League Cup | AFC competition(s) | |
|---|---|---|---|---|---|---|---|
| 1999–2000 | Second Division | | | – | – | – | – |
| 2001 | Second Division | | 1 | – | – | – | – |
| 2002 | First Division | 27 | 3rd, Group 2 | – | – | – | – |
| 2003 | First Division | 26 | 2nd, Promotion/Relegation play-offs | – | – | – | – |
| 2004 | Premier Division | 18 | 12 | – | – | – | – |
| 2005 | Premier Division | 28 | 8th, East division | First round | – | – | – |
| 2006 | Premier Division | 28 | 6th, East division | Second round | – | – | – |
| 2007–08 | Premier Division | 36 | 6th, West division | First round | – | – | – |
| 2008–09 | Indonesia Super League | 18 | 6 | Second round | – | – | – |
| 2009–10 | Indonesia Super League | 18 | 14 | – | – | – | – |
| 2010–11 | Indonesia Super League | 15 | 9 | Second round | – | – | – |
| 2011–12 | Indonesia Super League | 18 | 4 | – | – | – | – |
| 2013 | Indonesia Super League | 18 | 12 | – | – | – | – |
| 2014 | Indonesia Super League | 22 | 4th, Second round | – | – | – | – |
| 2015 | Indonesia Super League | 18 | did not finish | – | – | – | – |
| 2016 | Indonesia Soccer Championship A | 18 | 15 | – | – | – | – |
| 2017 | Liga 1 | 18 | 14 | – | – | – | – |
| 2018 | Liga 1 | 18 | 13 | Round of 16 | – | – | – |
| 2019 | Liga 1 | 18 | 11 | Round of 16 | – | – | – |
| 2020 | Liga 1 | 18 | did not finish | – | – | – | – |
| 2021–22 | Liga 1 | 18 | 17 | – | – | – | – |
| 2022–23 | Liga 2 | 28 | did not finish | – | – | – | – |
| 2023–24 | Liga 2 | 28 | 3rd, Championship round | – | – | – | – |
| 2024–25 | Liga 2 | 26 | 4th, Championship round | – | – | – | – |
| 2025–26 | Championship | 20 | 6th, Group 2 | – | – | – | – |
| 2026–27 | Championship | 20 | TBD | – | TBD | – | – |

== Honours ==
- Liga Indonesia Second Division
  - Champion (1): 2001
- East Java Governor's Cup
  - Winners (5): 2003, 2007, 2009, 2010, 2012

== Supporters ==
Persela Lamongan have many supporter groups, among others are LA Mania and Curva Boys 1967.

== Kit suppliers ==
- (United States) Reebok (2008–2011)
- (Italy) Diadora (2011–2016)
- (Indonesia) DJ Sport (2016)
- (Italy) Lotto (2017)
- (United States) Forium (2018–2019)
- (Thailand) Warrix Sports (2019 on Indonesia President Cup)
- (Indonesia) Octagon (2020)
- (Indonesia) Ad hoc (2021)
- (Indonesia) Grygera (2022)
- (Indonesia) Etams (2023–2026)
- (Indonesia) Octagon (2026–Present)

== Notable players ==
| Cup | Players |
|---|---|
| (United Arab Emirates) 2019 AFC Asian Cup | (Turkmenistan) Ahmet Ataýew |

== See also ==
- Persela U-21
- List of football clubs in Indonesia
- Lamongan Regency
