= PSS Sleman =

Association football team in Indonesia

- Full name: Perserikatan Sepakbola Sleman
- Nicknames: Super Elang Jawa (Super Java Eagles); Laskar Sembada (Sembada Warriors)
- Short name: PSS
- Founded: 20 May 1976; 50 years ago
- Ground: Maguwoharjo Stadium
- Capacity: 20,594
- Owner: PT Putra Sleman Sembada
- President: Yoni Arseto
- Head Coach: Demerson (interim)
- League: Super League
- 2025–26: Championship, runners-up (promoted)
- Website: pssleman.id
Home colours	Away colours

Perserikatan Sepakbola Sleman (lit. 'Sleman Football Union'), or mostly known through its abbreviation PSS, is an Indonesian professional football club based in Sleman Regency, Special Region of Yogyakarta. The club dons the nickname Super Elang Jawa (English: Super Java Eagles). They are set to compete in the Super League next season, following promotion from the 2025–26 Championship.

== History ==
PSS was established in 1976 as a regional football association for amateur clubs (known as Perserikatan) in Sleman, the third of its kind in Yogyakarta province after PSIM Yogyakarta and Persiba Bantul. PSS needed 24 years to reach the top-tier of the amateur Perserikatan competitions in 2000. After six years in the premier division, PSS was unable to complete the 2006 season after suffering from the 2006 Yogyakarta earthquake that killed more than 5,000 people and damaged thousands of buildings. However, the Indonesian football association PSSI did not relegate the three teams from Yogyakarta province, including PSS, although they forfeited their remaining games due to the earthquake's impact on their facilities and personal lives.

PSS left the top flight of Indonesian football in 2008 due to administrative matters.The club could not quickly adjust to the shift towards professional football with the launching of the Indonesian Super League (ISL) that year. ISL required Perserikatan clubs to wean off from their dependence on their region's state budget. Teams like PSS that continued to rely on the government had to compete in the second tier, which persistently used the Perserikatan's name for its top division (Divisi Utama). Amid heavy pressure from fans, PSS became a professional team in 2012 after the incorporation of PT Putra Sleman Sembada, the company that now manages the club. That move ensured PSS could return to the top flight if they manage to win promotion. PSS did so after winning the 2018 Liga 2 competition.

In the 2024–25 Liga 1 season PSS were relegated to Liga 2 despite winning their last four matches. This was after they were deducted three points due to a match-fixing case in the 2018 Liga 2 season.

On 3 May 2026, PSS secure promotion to Super League after defeat PSIS Semarang 3–0 in final matchday at Group 2 and return to top tier after one year absence.

== Statistics ==
=== Season by season record ===
Key to league record:

- Pos = Final position
- P = Played
- W = Games won
- D = Games drawn
- L = Games lost
- GF = Goals for
- GA = Goals against
- GD = Goal difference
- Pts = Points

Key to rounds:

- W = Winner
- F = Final
- SF = Semi-finals
- QF = Quarter-finals
- R16 = Round of 16
- R32 = Round of 32
- R64 = Round of 64
- R5 = Fifth round
- R4 = Fourth round
- R3 = Third round
- R2 = Second round
- R1 = First round
- GS = Group stage

Key to competitions

- Cup = Piala Indonesia
- CL = AFC Champions League
- AC = AFC Cup

Champions	Runners-up	Relegation	CL	AC

=== Seasons ===
Seasons of PSS Sleman
Season	League	Tier	Pos	P	W	D	L	GF	GA	Pts	Cup	Top Score	
1994–95	Second Division	3											
1995–96	First Division	2	First round										
1996–97	First Division	2	Second round										
1997–98	First Division	2	abandoned										
1998–99	First Division	2	4th Group 2										
1999–2000	First Division	2	2nd									(Indonesia) M. Eksan	11
2001	Premier Division	1	10th East	25	8	3	14	22	40	27			
2002	Premier Division	1	7th East	22	8	6	8	22	19	30			
2003	Premier Division	1	4th	38	16	12	10	48	43	60		(Brazil) Marcelo Braga	21
2004	Premier Division	1	4th	34	14	11	9	39	37	53		(Brazil) Marcelo Braga	15
2005	Premier Division	1	7th West	26	10	4	12	22	32	34	SF	(Brazil) Denilson Silva	7
2006	Premier Division	1	13th East	26	6	5	15	18	40	23	w/o	(Indonesia) S. Nurcahyo	4
2007–08	Premier Division	1	12th West	34	12	10	12	42	43	46		(Argentina) G. Castano	10
2008–09	Premier Division	2	10th Group 2	26	9	6	11	31	38	30	R1		
2009–10	Premier Division	2	10th Group 3	20	6	4	10	21	31	22	A	(Indonesia) M. Eksan	7
2010–11	Premier Division	2	10th Group 3	24	9	4	11	22	40	31	NH		
2011–12	Premier Division	2	7th Group 2	18	7	5	6	29	21	26	R1		
2013	Premier Division	2	1st	19	12	4	3	28	16	40	NH	(Indonesia) Anang Hadi	4
2014	Premier Division	2	Third Round	24	13	6	5	51	23	31	NH	(Cameroon) Guy Junior	11
2015	Premier Division	2	abandoned								NH		
2016	Indonesia Soccer Championship B	2	2nd								NH	(Indonesia) D. Mustaine	3
2017	Liga 2	2	Second round	20	13	3	4	36	15	42	NH	(Indonesia) Dirga Lasut	13
2018	Liga 2	2	1st	31	19	3	9	53	20	60	R16	(Indonesia) C. Gonzales	15
2019	Liga 1	1	8th	34	12	12	10	45	42	48	NH	(Ukraine) Y. Bokhashvili	16
2020	Liga 1	1	abandoned								NH		
2021–22	Liga 1	1	13th	34	10	9	15	40	48	39	NH	(Indonesia) Irfan Jaya	6
2022–23	Liga 1	1	16th	34	10	4	20	34	57	34	NH	(Indonesia) Kim Kurniawan	6
2023–24	Liga 1	1	13th	34	9	12	13	49	53	39	NH	(Argentina) E. Vizcarra	7
2024–25	Liga 1	1	16th	34	11	4	19	43	50	34	NH	(Brazil) G Tocantins	16
2025–26	Championship	2	2nd	28	16	9	3	55	21	57	NH	(Brazil) G Tocantins	24
2026–27	Super League	1		34	0	0	0	0	0	0	NH		

== Stadium ==
Maguwoharjo Stadium

PSS in 2007 began to use its current home base Maguwoharjo Stadium after construction was disrupted by the earthquake a year before. Maguwoharjo's southern tribune, where the club's ultras occupy, is known as one of the loudest tribunes in Indonesia with non-stop 90-minute chanting.

== Fans ==
PSS is known for its loyal and creative ultras. Supported by two fan clubs, the north tribune Slemania and the south tribune Brigata Curva Sud 1976 (BCS), PSS' current form cannot be extricated from the dedication of supporters who strive to improve their team's managerial quality. The older one, Slemania, was established in 2000 in line with the promotion to top-flight football while BCS emerged in 2011 in the run-up to the 2012 professionalization of PSS.

Besides its popularity as the fan club with one of the best choreographies in Asia, BCS is known for its tough scrutiny over PSS management. BCS boycotted games in the 2020 Liga 1 over disappointment with the level of professionalism in PSS and only ended its strike in 2021 after a massive restructuring that has led to improvements in how the club is managed. BCS is particularly aware of concerns among female spectators when they are in a packed stadium, leading to the formation of its own female arm to ensure safety in the tribune.

The song "Sampai Kau Bisa" (Until You Can) is the anthem that fans sing after the match. The anthem symbolizes fan loyalty to the team in good and bad times, knowing the club went through trials until it earned its spot in top-flight football. PSS fan clubs have a policy of zero insults for opposing teams during 90 minutes of a football game, making them the friendliest ultras in Indonesia football. Their chants are exclusive to motivating PSS.

== Players ==
=== Current squad ===
As of August 2026

Note: Flags indicate national team as defined under FIFA eligibility rules; some limited exceptions apply. Players may hold more than one non-FIFA nationality.

No.	Pos.	Nation	Player
1	GK	BRA	Pedro Caracoci
3	DF	BRA	Lucão
4	DF	BRA	Cleberson (captain)
6	DF	IDN	Kevin Gomes
7	MF	JPN	Hiromu Tanaka
8	MF	MLI	Moussa Bagayoko
10	MF	FRA	Frédéric Injaï
11	FW	BRA	Gustavo Tocantins
13	DF	IDN	Farrel Luckyta
15	FW	MKD	Stefan Ashkovski
16	DF	IDN	Salman Alfarid
17	DF	IDN	Saiful Djoge
18	FW	BRA	Matheus Fornazari
19	DF	IDN	Fachruddin Aryanto
22	FW	IDN	Junior Haqi
23	MF	IDN	Kim Kurniawan (vice-captain)
25	MF	IDN	Riko Simanjuntak

No.	Pos.	Nation	Player
26	FW	IDN	Ferrel Santoso
27	MF	IDN	Markus Madjar
28	MF	IDN	Arda Alfareza
30	MF	IDN	Isfandyar Abdillah
31	GK	IDN	Safaat Romadhona
32	GK	IDN	Ega Rizky
33	DF	IDN	Joseph Kurniawan
55	MF	BDI	Christophe Nduwarugira
71	GK	IDN	Lukman Adi
72	MF	IDN	Claudio Mutzi
73	DF	IDN	Jajang Mulyana
74	DF	IDN	Ahmad Arrafi
76	MF	IDN	Dominikus Dion
77	FW	UGA	Melvyn Lorenzen
97	FW	IDN	Dimas Drajad

=== Out on loan ===
Note: Flags indicate national team as defined under FIFA eligibility rules; some limited exceptions apply. Players may hold more than one non-FIFA nationality.

No.	Pos.	Nation	Player
—	DF	IDN	Muhammad Fariz (at Adhyaksa Bekasi)

=== Naturalized players ===
Country	Player
Germany	Kim Kurniawan

=== Out on loan ===
Note: Flags indicate national team as defined under FIFA eligibility rules; some limited exceptions apply. Players may hold more than one non-FIFA nationality.

No.	Pos.	Nation	Player

== Club officials ==
=== Board of commissioners and directors ===
Position	Name
Commissioner	(Indonesia) Agoes Projosasmito
Commissioner	(Indonesia) Rachmat Makassau
President Director	(Indonesia) Yoni Arseto
Director	(Indonesia) Serena K Ferdinandus
Director	(Indonesia) Hempri Suyatna

=== Team management ===
As of 30 January2026

Position	Name
Technical Director	Vacant
Head Coach	(Netherlands) Pieter Huistra
Assistant Coach	(Indonesia) Ansyari Lubis
Goalkeeper Coach	(Indonesia) Andika Wahyu Utomo
Physical Coach	(Indonesia) Aditiyas Budi Santoso
Translator	(Brazil) Demerson Bruno Costa
Team Manager	(Indonesia) Kim Kurniawan
Team Secretary	(Indonesia) Ega Gian Vembriarto
Team Analyst	Vacant
Scout	Vacant
Team Doctor	(Indonesia) Riko Arundito
Physiotherapist	(Indonesia) Alifano Dwi Cahyo (Indonesia) Sigit Pramudya
Masseur	(Indonesia) Mohammad Danial Al Fikri (Indonesia) Nur Dharma Wisesa (Indonesia) Yogi Suhendra
Media Officer	(Indonesia) Veronica Vita Subiyakti
Kit man	(Indonesia) Tri Sabto Nugroho

=== Coaches ===
Period	Name
1976–1994	unknown
1995–1996	(Indonesia) Suwarno
1997–1998	vacant
1999–2000	(Indonesia) Drs. Bambang Nurdjoko, Drs. Herwin Sjahruddin
2001–2002	(Indonesia) Suharno
2003	(Indonesia) Yudi Suryata
2004–2005	(Indonesia) Daniel Roekito
2005	(Indonesia) Mundari Karya
2005–2006	(Indonesia) Herry Kiswanto
2007	(Argentina) Horacio Alberto Montes
2007	(Indonesia) Rudy William Keltjes
2008	(Indonesia) Iwan Setiawan
2008	(Indonesia) Yudi Suryata
2008–2009	(Indonesia) Maman Durachman
2009–2010	(Indonesia) Yance Efraim Matmey
2010	(Indonesia) Singh Bettay
2010	(Indonesia) Inyong Lolombulan
2010–2011	(Indonesia) M. Basri
2011–2012	(Indonesia) Widyantoro
2013	(Indonesia) Hanafi
2013	(Indonesia) Yusak Sutanto
2013	(Indonesia) Lafran Pribadi
2014	(Indonesia) Sartono Anwar
2014	(Indonesia) Herry Kiswanto
2015	(Indonesia) Jaya Hartono
2015 (Piala kemerdekaan)	(Indonesia) Didik Listyantara
5 March 2016 – 11 January 2017	(Indonesia) Seto Nurdiantoro
11 January 2017 – 16 October 2017	(Indonesia) Freddy Mulli
12 January 2017 – 6 May 2018	(Indonesia) Herry Kiswanto
23 May 2018 – 15 January 2020	(Indonesia) Seto Nurdiantoro
15 January 2020 – 24 February 2020	(Spain) Eduardo Perez
26 February 2020 – 19 December 2021	(Serbia) Dejan Antonić
20 December 2021 – 9 April 2022	(Indonesia) Putu Gede
9 April 2022 – 26 April 2023	(Indonesia) Seto Nurdiantoro
27 April 2023 – 9 October 2023	(Romania) Marian Mihail
9 October – 18 November 2023	(Belgium) Bertrand Crasson
18 November 2023 – 26 June 2024	(Serbia) Risto Vidaković
27 June – 10 October 2024	(Japan) Wagner Lopes
13 October 2024 – 19 February 2025	(Brazil) Mazola Júnior
19 February 2025 – 2 July 2025	(Netherlands) Pieter Huistra
2 July 2025 – 13 May 2026	(Indonesia) Ansyari Lubis
13 May 2026 –	(Netherlands) Pieter Huistra

== Honours ==
=== Domestic league ===
- Liga Indonesia First Division / Liga 2 / Championship
  - Winners: 2018
  - Runners-up: 2000, 2025–26
- Liga Indonesia Premier Division (LPIS)
  - Winners: 2013
- Indonesia Soccer Championship B
  - Runners-up: 2016

=== Cup ===
- Menpora Cup
  - Third place: 2021
