= Donggala United F.C. =

Indonesian football club

Donggala United
- Full name: Donggala United Football Club
- Nickname: The Weavers
- Short name: DUFC
- Founded: 3 August 2026; 3 months ago (as Donggala United)
- Ground: Gawalise Stadium
- Capacity: 20,000
- Owner: Ronny Tanusaputra
- Chairman: Rusdy Mastura
- Head coach: Ridwan Saragih
- League: Liga Nusantara
- 2025–26: Championship (Group 2), 10th (relegated)
Home colours	Away colours	Third colours

Donggala United Football Club, commonly known as Donggala United, is an Indonesian professional football club based in Donggala, Central Sulawesi. They compete in the Liga Nusantara, following relegation from the 2025–26 Championship.

In 2022, club then-known as Persipal BU bought Muba Babel United's slot and entered the Championship. Persipal played at Gawalise Stadium in downtown Palu, Central Sulawesi. Mascot of the club is Julang Sulawesi (Sulawesi wrinkled hornbill).

== History ==
Persipal competed in the 2022–23 Liga 2, while the original club served as youth club called Persipal Palu Junior, competing in the 2022–23 Liga 3. Starting from the 2024–25 Liga 2 season, Persipal's name changed to Persipal Football Club. Starting from the 2026–27 Liga Nusantara season, Persipal's name changed to Donggala United Football Club.

== Players ==
=== Current squad ===
Note: Flags indicate national team as defined under FIFA eligibility rules; some limited exceptions apply. Players may hold more than one non-FIFA nationality.

No.	Pos.	Nation	Player
2	DF	IDN	Muhammad Izam
5	DF	IDN	Reza Anugrah Lubis
7	FW	IDN	Meran Antolin
8	MF	IDN	Nugroho Fatchur Rochman
9	FW	IDN	Sutan Zico
10	FW	IDN	Wahyu Illahi
11	FW	IDN	Al Muzzani
12	DF	IDN	Luthfi Anshorri
14	DF	IDN	Nur Kholis
15	DF	IDN	Kaka Irawan
16	MF	IDN	Ghozali Aufathul
18	FW	IDN	Raka Winata
19	MF	IDN	Alif Rizky

No.	Pos.	Nation	Player
20	GK	IDN	Rendik Andika
21	MF	IDN	Aan Dwi Saputra
22	GK	IDN	Aditya Ramadhan
24	DF	IDN	Vikra Fahlevi
27	DF	IDN	Zakarian Ibarzha
28	DF	IDN	Ismawan
30	DF	IDN	M. Raihan
31	MF	IDN	Syahril Aidil
32	MF	IDN	Bagas Prasetyo
55	DF	IDN	Maulana Zidane
77	FW	IDN	Iman
90	GK	IDN	Mohammad Yudha
97	MF	IDN	Galang Kurniawan

== Coaching staff ==
Position	Name
Head coach	(Indonesia) Ridwan Saragih
Assistant coach	(Indonesia) Andil Andika
Goalkeeper coach	(Indonesia) Dede Pranata
Physical coach	(Indonesia) Rifqi Hadianto

== Season-by-season records ==
As Aceh United

Season(s)	League/Division	Tms.	Pos.	Piala Indonesia	AFC competition(s)	
2011	Liga Primer Indonesia	19	11	–	–	–
2012						
2013
2014
2015
2016
2017	Liga 3	32	3	–	–	–
2018	Liga 2	24	4th, Second round	–	–	–

As Babel United/Muba Babel United

Season(s)	League/Division	Tms.	Pos.	Piala Indonesia	AFC competition(s)	
2019	Liga 2	24	8th, West division	–	–	–
2020	Liga 2	24	season abandoned	–	–	–
2021	Liga 2	24	5th, Group A	–	–	–

As Persipal Palu

Season(s)	League/Division	Tms.	Pos.	Piala Indonesia	AFC competition(s)	
2022–23	Liga 2	28	season abandoned	–	–	–
2023–24	Liga 2	28	4th, Championship round	–	–	–
2024–25	Liga 2	26	2nd, Relegation round	–	–	–
2025–26	Championship	20	10th, Group 2	–	–	–

As Donggala United

Season(s)	League/Division	Tms.	Pos.	Piala Indonesia	AFC competition(s)	
2026–27	Liga Nusantara	24	TBD	–	–	–
