= 2023 Liga 3 West Java Series 1 =

Tournament details
- Dates: 3 – 30 December 2023
- Teams: 24

Final positions
- Champions: Persipasi
- Runners-up: Persikas
- Third place: PSGC
- Qualified for: 2023–24 Liga 3 National Phase

Tournament statistics
- Matches played: 76
- Goals scored: 275 (3.62 per match)

The 2023 Liga 3 West Java Series 1 was the eighth season of Liga 3 West Java Series 1 as a qualifying round for the national round of the 2023–24 Liga 3.

Persipasi were the defending champion.

== Teams ==
=== Changes from last season ===
▲ Promoted from Series 2	▼ Relegated to Series 2
Al Jabbar; PSGJ; Persima; Pesik	Persindra; Depok United; Roksi

=== Participating teams ===
No	Team	Location	2022 season
1	Bandung United	Bandung CIty	3rd in Group B
2	Persipasi	Bekasi City	Champion
3	Persikasi	Bekasi Regency	Semifinalist
4	PSB	Bogor City	5th in Group A
5	Citeureup Raya	Bogor Regency	3rd in Group F
6	PSGC	Ciamis Regency	3rd in Group E
7	Cimahi Putra	Cimahi City	4th in Group B
8	Ebod Jaya Cimahi	Cimahi City	3rd in Group A
9	Al Jabbar	Cirebon Regency	Champion (S2)
10	PSGJ	Cirebon Regency	Runner Up (S2)
11	Dejan	Depok City	Runner Up
12	Depok City	Depok City	4th in Group E
13	Depok Raya	Depok City	4th in Group D
14	Persipu	Depok City	5th in Group D

No	Team	Location	2022 season
15	Persigar	Garut Regency	5th in Group B
16	Karawang United	Karawang Regency	3rd in Group C
17	Persika 1951	Karawang Regency	4th in Group F
18	Pesik	Kuningan Regency	Semifinalist (S2)
19	Persima	Majalengka Regency	Semifinalist (S2)
20	Persipo	Purwakarta Regency	Semifinalist
21	Persikas	Subang Regency	5th in Group C
22	Perses	Sumedang Regency	4th in Group C
23	Persitas	Tasikmalaya Regency	4th in Group A
24	Persikabbar	West Bandung Regency	3rd in Group D

== Additional play-off for qualification to the national phase ==
As of 24 November 2023, Asprov PSSI West Java confirmed that there are 3 free slots to the national phase based on the results of 2022 season. The 3 slots were awarded to Persipasi, Dejan, and play-off winner.

As of 21 February 2024, PSSI confirmed that there are 4 free slots to the national phase based on the results of 2022 season. So the play-off loser is also eligible to qualify

29 November 2023
10.00 WIB

Persikasi	1–1 (a.e.t.)	Persipo
	Report
Penalties
	3–2

Siliwangi Stadium, Bandung City

== First round ==
=== Group A ===
All matches will be held at Mashud Wisnusaputra Stadium, Kuningan Regency.

Pos	Team	Pld	W	D	L	GF	GA	GD	Pts	Qualification	CIA	DCI	KNG	MJL	KAR	SUM
1	PSGC	5	4	1	0	11	1	+10	13	Qualification to Second round	—		1–0		4–0	1–1
2	Depok City	5	3	1	1	13	4	+9	10	Qualification to Second round	0–2	—	1–1			5–0
3	Pesik (H)	5	2	2	1	6	3	+3	8				—	0–0	3–0	2–1
4	Persima	5	2	1	2	12	8	+4	7		0–3	0–3		—		
5	Karawang United	5	1	0	4	4	20	−16	3			1–4		1–8	—	2–1
6	Perses	5	0	1	4	4	14	−10	1					1–4		—

Source: Liga 3 Jabar Seri 1 2023
Legend: Blue = home team win; Yellow = draw; Red = away team win.
(H) Hosts

=== Group B ===
All matches will be held at Patriot Candrabhaga Stadium, Bekasi City.

Pos	Team	Pld	W	D	L	GF	GA	GD	Pts	Qualification	PCB	SUB	DEJ	CTR	KSI	PSB
1	Persipasi (H)	5	4	0	1	12	6	+6	12	Qualification to Second round	—			3–2		2–0
2	Persikas	5	3	1	1	15	12	+3	10	Qualification to Second round	1–4	—		3–1		
3	Dejan	5	2	2	1	11	9	+2	8		1–2	3–3	—		2–2	
4	Citeureup Raya	5	2	0	3	7	9	−2	6				1–2	—	2–1	1–0
5	Persikasi	5	1	2	2	8	10	−2	5		2–1	1–3			—	
6	PSB	5	0	1	4	6	13	−7	1			3–5	1–3		2–2	—

Source: Liga 3 Jabar Seri 1 2023
Legend: Blue = home team win; Yellow = draw; Red = away team win.
(H) Hosts

=== Group C ===
All matches will be held at Singaperbangsa Stadium, Karawang Regency.

Pos	Team	Pld	W	D	L	GF	GA	GD	Pts	Qualification	PKA	GAR	EBO	ALJ	DRY	BBR
1	Persika 1951 (H)	5	4	0	1	21	7	+14	12	Qualification to Second round	—	0–2		5–1	6–1	
2	Persigar	5	3	2	0	11	5	+6	11	Qualification to Second round		—				4–1
3	Ebod Jaya Cimahi	5	2	1	2	20	13	+7	7		2–5	1–2	—		5–1	
4	Al Jabbar	5	1	2	2	12	12	0	5			1–1	3–3	—		1–2
5	Depok Raya	5	1	1	3	8	21	−13	4			2–2		1–6	—	3–2
6	Persikabbar	5	1	0	4	8	22	−14	3		1–5		2–9			—

Source: Liga 3 Jabar Seri 1 2023
Legend: Blue = home team win; Yellow = draw; Red = away team win.
(H) Hosts

=== Group D ===
All matches will be held at Merpati Stadium, Depok City.

Pos	Team	Pld	W	D	L	GF	GA	GD	Pts	Qualification	CPT	PPU	BUN	PPO	TAS	PGJ
1	Cimahi Putra	5	4	1	0	13	3	+10	13	Qualification to Second round	—	2–1	3–0		2–2	
2	Persipu (H)	5	3	1	1	9	3	+6	10	Qualification to Second round		—	0–0	2–0		3–0 (Note: Persipu were awarded a 3–0 win over PSGJ, as PSGJ players and officials did not attend the match.)
3	Bandung United	5	2	1	2	3	6	−3	7				—		2–1	
4	Persipo	5	2	0	3	5	9	−4	6		0–4		2–0	—		2–3
5	Persitas	5	0	2	3	5	9	−4	2			1–3		0–1	—	
6	PSGJ (Note: PSGJ was deducted three points by the disciplinary committee of Asprov PSSI West Java for deliberately not attending the match against Persipu on 15 December 2023.)	5	1	1	3	4	9	−5	1		0–2		0–1		1–1	—

Source: Liga 3 Jabar Seri 1 2023
Legend: Blue = home team win; Yellow = draw; Red = away team win.
(H) Hosts

== Second round ==
=== Group E ===
All matches will be held at Singaperbangsa Stadium, Karawang Regency.

Pos	Team	Pld	W	D	L	GF	GA	GD	Pts	Qualification
1	Persikas	3	2	0	1	6	4	+2	6 (Note: Head-to-head result: PSGC 2–3 Persikas.)	Advance to the Knockout round and 2023–24 Liga 3 National Phase
2	PSGC	3	2	0	1	8	5	+3	6	Advance to the Knockout round and 2023–24 Liga 3 National Phase
3	Persika 1951 (H)	3	1	1	1	2	2	0	4	Advance to the 2023–24 Liga 3 National Phase
4	Persipu	3	0	1	2	2	7	−5	1	Advance to the 2023–24 Liga 3 National Phase

Source: Liga 3 Jabar Seri 1 2023
(H) Hosts
Notes:
21 December 2023
13.15 WIB

PSGC	2–3	Persikas
	Report

Singaperbangsa Stadium, Karawang Regency
21 December 2023
15.30 WIB

Persika 1951	0–0	Persipu
	Report

Singaperbangsa Stadium, Karawang Regency

23 December 2023
13.15 WIB

Persipu	1–4	PSGC
	Report

Singaperbangsa Stadium, Karawang Regency
23 December 2023
15.30 WIB

Persikas	0–1	Persika 1951
	Report

Singaperbangsa Stadium, Karawang Regency

26 December 2023
13.15 WIB

Persikas	3–1	Persipu
	Report

Singaperbangsa Stadium, Karawang Regency
26 December 2023
15.30 WIB

PSGC	2–1	Persika 1951
	Report

Singaperbangsa Stadium, Karawang Regency

=== Group F ===
All matches will be held at Gelora R.A.A. Adiwijaya Stadium, Garut Regency.

Pos	Team	Pld	W	D	L	GF	GA	GD	Pts	Qualification
1	Persipasi	3	2	1	0	7	1	+6	7	Advance to the Knockout round and 2023–24 Liga 3 National Phase
2	Depok City	3	2	0	1	3	3	0	6	Advance to the Knockout round
3	Cimahi Putra	3	0	2	1	3	4	−1	2	Advance to the 2023–24 Liga 3 National Phase
4	Persigar (H)	3	0	1	2	1	6	−5	1	Advance to the 2023–24 Liga 3 National Phase

Source: Liga 3 Jabar Seri 1 2023
(H) Hosts
21 December 2023
13.15 WIB

Persipasi	2–0	Depok City
	Report

Gelora R.A.A. Adiwijaya Stadium, Garut Regency
21 December 2023
15.30 WIB

Cimahi Putra	1–1	Persigar
	Report

Gelora R.A.A. Adiwijaya Stadium, Garut Regency

23 December 2023
13.15 WIB

Depok City	2–1	Cimahi Putra
	Report

Gelora R.A.A. Adiwijaya Stadium, Garut Regency
23 December 2023
15.30 WIB

Persigar	0–4	Persipasi
	Report

Gelora R.A.A. Adiwijaya Stadium, Garut Regency

26 December 2023
13.15 WIB

Persipasi	1–1	Cimahi Putra
	Report

Gelora R.A.A. Adiwijaya Stadium, Garut Regency
26 December 2023
15.30 WIB

Depok City	1–0	Persigar
	Report

Gelora R.A.A. Adiwijaya Stadium, Garut Regency

== Knockout round ==
=== Bracket ===
Semi-finals
28 December 2023 – Karawang
E1	Persikas	2
F2	Depok City	0
28 December 2023 – Karawang
F1	Persipasi	2
E2	PSGC	1

Final
30 December 2023 – Karawang
Persikas	0
Persipasi	2
Third place play-off
30 December 2023 – Karawang
Depok City	4 (2)
PSGC (p)	4 (4)

=== Semi-finals ===
28 December 2023
13.00 WIB

Persikas	2–0	Depok City
	Report

Singaperbangsa Stadium, Karawang Regency

28 December 2023
15.30 WIB

Persipasi	2–1	PSGC
	Report

Singaperbangsa Stadium, Karawang Regency

=== Third place play-off ===
30 December 2023
08.00 WIB

Depok City	4–4	PSGC
	Report
Penalties
	2–4

Singaperbangsa Stadium, Karawang Regency

=== Final ===
30 December 2023
14.00 WIB

Persikas	0–2	Persipasi
	Report

Singaperbangsa Stadium, Karawang Regency

== Qualification to the national phase ==
Free slots

Team	Method of qualification	Date of qualification	Qualified to
Persipasi	Champions of 2022 Liga 3 West Java Series 1	17 January 2023	2023–24 Liga 3 National Phase
Dejan	Runner-up of 2022 Liga 3 West Java Series 1	17 January 2023	2023–24 Liga 3 National Phase
Persikasi	[[Winner of Additional play-off]]	29 November 2023	2023–24 Liga 3 National Phase
Persipo	[[Loser of Additional play-off]]	29 November 2023	2023–24 Liga 3 National Phase

2023 season

As of 1 March 2024, Asprov PSSI West Java confirmed that Depok City withdrew from the national phase due to the club's financial problems. Instead, the remaining slot was given to Persigar Garut as the eighth-ranked team of 2023 Liga 3 West Java Series 1.

Team	Method of qualification	Date of qualification	Qualified to
Persikas	Runner-up of 2023 Liga 3 West Java Series 1	28 December 2023	2023–24 Liga 3 National Phase
PSGC	Third-placed team of 2023 Liga 3 West Java Series 1	28 December 2023	2023–24 Liga 3 National Phase
Persika 1951	Fifth-placed team of 2023 Liga 3 West Java Series 1	28 December 2023	2023–24 Liga 3 National Phase
Cimahi Putra	Sixth-placed team of 2023 Liga 3 West Java Series 1	28 December 2023	2023–24 Liga 3 National Phase
Persipu	Seventh-placed team of 2023 Liga 3 West Java Series 1	28 December 2023	2023–24 Liga 3 National Phase
Persigar	Eighth-placed team of 2023 Liga 3 West Java Series 1	1 March 2024	2023–24 Liga 3 National Phase

== See also ==
- 2023 Liga 3 West Java Series 2
- 2023 Liga 3 Banten
- 2023 Liga 3 Jakarta
- 2023 Liga 3 Central Java
- 2023 Liga 3 Special Region of Yogyakarta
- 2023 Liga 3 East Java
