= 2025–26 Liga 4 West Java Series 1 =

Liga 4 West Java Series 1
- Season: 2025–26
- Dates: 1 November – 1 December 2025
- Champions: Persikotas (1st title)
- Relegated: Al Jabbar; Cimahi Putra; Karawang United; Patriot Bekasi; Persikab; Persitas
- National phase: Persikotas; Persika 1951; Pesik; Cimahi United; Persindra; Persigar

The 2025–26 Liga 4 West Java Series 1 was the second season of Liga 4 West Java Series 1 after the structural changes of Indonesian football competition and serves as a qualifying round for the national phase of the 2025–26 Liga 4. The competition is organised by the West Java Provincial PSSI Association.

== Teams ==
=== Teams changes ===
The following teams changed division after the 2024–25 season.

To Series 1
▼ Relegated from Liga Nusantara
- Persikab
- Persipasi
▲ Promoted from Series 2
- Patriot Bekasi
- Persikad 1999 (Note: Originally four teams promoted to Series 1, but Persikad (formerly Persikad 1999) moved up to Championship by taking place of Sumut United on 4 June 2025.)
- Persikotas
- EASGA (not participated)

From Series 1
▼ Relegated to Series 2
- Persipo
- Citeureup Raya
- Mandala
- Persikabbar

=== Participating teams ===
A total of 24 teams are competing in this season. The teams are divided into 4 blocks based on the geographical location of their homebase.

No	Team	Location
Zone 1
1	Depok Raya	Depok City
2	Persipu	Depok City
3	Patriot Bekasi	Bekasi City
4	PCB Persipasi	Bekasi City
5	Persikasi	Bekasi Regency
6	Karawang United	Karawang Regency
7	Persika 1951	Karawang Regency
8	ASAD Purwakarta	Purwakarta Regency
Zone 2
9	PSB	Bogor City
10	Ebod Jasukars	Sukabumi Regency
11	Persikabumi	Sukabumi Regency
12	Perkesit	Cianjur Regency
13	Cimahi Putra	Cimahi City
14	Cimahi United	Cimahi City
15	Bandung United	Bandung City
16	Persikab	Bandung Regency

No	Team	Location
Zone 3
17	Perses	Sumedang Regency
18	Persindra	Indramayu Regency
19	Persima	Majalengka Regency
20	Pesik	Kuningan Regency
21	Al Jabbar	Cirebon Regency
22	Persigar	Garut Regency
23	Persikotas	Tasikmalaya City
24	Persitas	Tasikmalaya Regency

== First round ==
The 24 teams will be drawn into 6 groups of four based on the geographical location of their homebase. The first round will be played in a home tournament format of single round-robin matches.

The top two teams of each group will qualify for the second round, while the bottom-ranked team from each group will be relegated to the 2026–27 Series 2.

=== Group A ===
All matches will be held at Panca Waluya Town Football Field, Purwakarta.

Pos	Team	Pld	W	D	L	GF	GA	GD	Pts	Qualification or relegation
1	Persikasi	3	2	1	0	10	6	+4	7	Qualification to the Second round
2	Persika 1951	3	2	1	0	9	2	+7	7	Qualification to the Second round
3	Depok Raya	3	1	0	2	3	9	−6	3	
4	Karawang United (R)	3	0	0	3	6	11	−5	0	Relegated to 2026–27 Series 2

Source: Liga 4 West Java Series 1
Rules for classification: 1) Points; 2) Head-to-head points; 3) Head-to-head goal difference; 4) Head-to-head goals scored; 5) Goal difference; 6) Goals scored; 7) Fair-play points; 8) Draw.
(R) Relegated

=== Group B ===
All matches will be held at Panca Waluya Town Football Field, Purwakarta.

Pos	Team	Pld	W	D	L	GF	GA	GD	Pts	Qualification or relegation
1	ASAD Purwakarta (H)	3	3	0	0	7	0	+7	9	Qualification to the Second round
2	Persipasi Kota Bekasi	3	2	0	1	6	1	+5	6	Qualification to the Second round
3	Persipu	3	1	0	2	3	6	−3	3	
4	Patriot Bekasi (R)	3	0	0	3	0	9	−9	0	Relegated to 2026–27 Series 2

Source: Liga 4 West Java Series 1
Rules for classification: 1) Points; 2) Head-to-head points; 3) Head-to-head goal difference; 4) Head-to-head goals scored; 5) Goal difference; 6) Goals scored; 7) Fair-play points; 8) Draw.
(H) Hosts; (R) Relegated

=== Group C ===
All matches will be held at Jagorawi Field, Bogor.

Pos	Team	Pld	W	D	L	GF	GA	GD	Pts	Qualification or relegation
1	Cimahi United	3	3	0	0	6	1	+5	9	Qualification to the Second round
2	Persikabumi	3	2	0	1	5	2	+3	6	Qualification to the Second round
3	Ebod Jasukars	3	1	0	2	5	4	+1	3	
4	Persikab Bandung (R)	3	0	0	3	0	9	−9	0	Relegated to 2026–27 Series 2

Source: Liga 4 West Java Series 1
Rules for classification: 1) Points; 2) Head-to-head points; 3) Head-to-head goal difference; 4) Head-to-head goals scored; 5) Goal difference; 6) Goals scored; 7) Fair-play points; 8) Draw.
(R) Relegated

=== Group D ===
All matches will be held at Jagorawi Field, Bogor.

Pos	Team	Pld	W	D	L	GF	GA	GD	Pts	Qualification or relegation
1	PSB Bogor (H)	3	2	0	1	5	4	+1	6	Qualification to the Second round
2	Bandung United	3	2	0	1	7	3	+4	6	Qualification to the Second round
3	Perkesit	3	2	0	1	6	2	+4	6	
4	Cimahi Putra (R)	3	0	0	3	0	9	−9	0	Relegated to 2026–27 Series 2

Source: Liga 4 West Java Series 1
Rules for classification: 1) Points; 2) Head-to-head points; 3) Head-to-head goal difference; 4) Head-to-head goals scored; 5) Goal difference; 6) Goals scored; 7) Fair-play points; 8) Draw.
(H) Hosts; (R) Relegated

=== Group E ===
All matches will be held at R.A.A. Adiwijaya Stadium, Garut.

Pos	Team	Pld	W	D	L	GF	GA	GD	Pts	Qualification or relegation
1	Persikotas	3	2	1	0	5	1	+4	7	Qualification to the Second round
2	Persigar (H)	3	1	1	1	4	3	+1	4	Qualification to the Second round
3	Perses	3	1	0	2	3	5	−2	3	
4	Persitas (R)	3	1	0	2	2	5	−3	3	Relegated to 2026–27 Series 2

Source: Liga 4 West Java Series 1
Rules for classification: 1) Points; 2) Head-to-head points; 3) Head-to-head goal difference; 4) Head-to-head goals scored; 5) Goal difference; 6) Goals scored; 7) Fair-play points; 8) Draw.
(H) Hosts; (R) Relegated

=== Group F ===
All matches will be held at Mashud Wisnusaputra Stadium, Kuningan.

Pos	Team	Pld	W	D	L	GF	GA	GD	Pts	Qualification or relegation
1	Pesik (H)	3	2	1	0	9	0	+9	7	Qualification to the Second round
2	Persindra	3	2	0	1	6	2	+4	6	Qualification to the Second round
3	Persima	3	1	1	1	3	3	0	4	
4	Al Jabbar (R)	3	0	0	3	1	14	−13	0	Relegated to 2026–27 Series 2

Source: Liga 4 West Java Series 1
Rules for classification: 1) Points; 2) Head-to-head points; 3) Head-to-head goal difference; 4) Head-to-head goals scored; 5) Goal difference; 6) Goals scored; 7) Fair-play points; 8) Draw.
(H) Hosts; (R) Relegated

== Second round ==
The top 12 teams from the first round will be divided into 4 groups of three teams. The second round will be played in a home tournament format of single round-robin matches.

The top two teams of each group will advance to the third round.

=== Group 1 ===
All matches will be held at Purnawarman Stadium, Purwakarta.

Pos	Team	Pld	W	D	L	GF	GA	GD	Pts	Qualification
1	Persika 1951	2	2	0	0	5	0	+5	6	Qualification to the Third round
2	Cimahi United	2	0	1	1	0	2	−2	1	Qualification to the Third round
3	Persipasi Kota Bekasi	2	0	1	1	0	3	−3	1	

Source: Liga 4 West Java Series 1
Rules for classification: 1) Points; 2) Head-to-head points; 3) Head-to-head goal difference; 4) Head-to-head goals scored; 5) Goal difference; 6) Goals scored; 7) Fair-play points; 8) Draw.

=== Group 2 ===
All matches will be held at Purnawarman Stadium, Purwakarta.

Pos	Team	Pld	W	D	L	GF	GA	GD	Pts	Qualification
1	ASAD Purwakarta (H)	2	1	1	0	2	1	+1	4	Qualification to the Third round
2	Persikasi	2	1	0	1	1	1	0	3	Qualification to the Third round
3	Persikabumi	2	0	1	1	1	2	−1	1	

Source: Liga 4 West Java Series 1
Rules for classification: 1) Points; 2) Head-to-head points; 3) Head-to-head goal difference; 4) Head-to-head goals scored; 5) Goal difference; 6) Goals scored; 7) Fair-play points; 8) Draw.
(H) Hosts

=== Group 3 ===
All matches will be held at Mashud Wisnusaputra Stadium, Kuningan.

Pos	Team	Pld	W	D	L	GF	GA	GD	Pts	Qualification
1	Persigar	2	1	1	0	3	1	+2	4	Qualification to the Third round
2	Pesik (H)	2	1	1	0	4	3	+1	4	Qualification to the Third round
3	PSB Bogor	2	0	0	2	2	5	−3	0	

Source: Liga 4 West Java Series 1
Rules for classification: 1) Points; 2) Head-to-head points; 3) Head-to-head goal difference; 4) Head-to-head goals scored; 5) Goal difference; 6) Goals scored; 7) Fair-play points; 8) Draw.
(H) Hosts

=== Group 4 ===
All matches will be held at Mashud Wisnusaputra Stadium, Kuningan.

Pos	Team	Pld	W	D	L	GF	GA	GD	Pts	Qualification
1	Persindra	2	2	0	0	8	1	+7	6	Qualification to the Third round
2	Persikotas	2	1	0	1	4	1	+3	3	Qualification to the Third round
3	Bandung United	2	0	0	2	1	11	−10	0	

Source: Liga 4 West Java Series 1
Rules for classification: 1) Points; 2) Head-to-head points; 3) Head-to-head goal difference; 4) Head-to-head goals scored; 5) Goal difference; 6) Goals scored; 7) Fair-play points; 8) Draw.

== Third round ==
The top eight teams from the second round will be divided into 2 groups of four teams. The third round will be played in a home tournament format of single round-robin matches.

The top two teams of each group will advance to the knockout round, while the top three teams will qualify for the national phase.

=== Group X ===
All matches will be held at Purnawarman Stadium, Purwakarta.

Pos	Team	Pld	W	D	L	GF	GA	GD	Pts	Qualification
1	Persika 1951	3	2	1	0	3	0	+3	7	Qualification to the knockout round and national phase
2	Persikotas	3	1	1	1	2	1	+1	4	Qualification to the knockout round and national phase
3	Persigar	3	0	3	0	1	1	0	3	Qualification to the national phase
4	Persikasi	3	0	1	2	1	5	−4	1	

Source: Liga 4 West Java Series 1

=== Group Y ===
All matches will be held at Purnawarman Stadium, Purwakarta.

Pos	Team	Pld	W	D	L	GF	GA	GD	Pts	Qualification
1	Cimahi United	3	3	0	0	5	2	+3	9	Qualification to the knockout round and national phase
2	Pesik	3	2	0	1	7	2	+5	6	Qualification to the knockout round and national phase
3	Persindra	3	1	0	2	4	3	+1	3	Qualification to the national phase
4	ASAD Purwakarta (H)	3	0	0	3	2	11	−9	0	

Source: Liga 4 West Java Series 1
(H) Hosts

== Knockout round ==
Each tie in the knockout round, apart from the third place play-off, is played over two legs, with each team playing one leg at home. The team that scores more goals on aggregate over the two legs advances to the next round (the away goals rule is not applied). If the aggregate score is level, the winners are decided by a penalty shoot-out. In the final, which is played as a single match, if the score is level at the end of normal time, a penalty shoot-out is played.

=== Bracket ===
Semi-finals
X1	Persika 1951	1	2	3
Y2	Pesik Kuningan	0	1	1
Y1	Cimahi United	0	1	1
X2	Persikotas Tasikmalaya	2	3	5

Final
Persika 1951	0	1	1
Persikotas Tasikmalaya	0	2	2
Third place play-off
Pesik Kuningan	4
Cimahi United	1

=== Semi-finals ===
==== Summary ====
Team 1	Agg.	Team 2	1st leg	2nd leg
Persika 1951	3–1	Pesik Kuningan	1–0	2–1
Cimahi United	1–5	Persikotas Tasikmalaya	0–2	1–3

==== Matches ====
25 November 2025
13.00 WIB (UTC+7)

Persika 1951	1–0	Pesik Kuningan

Arcamanik Stadium, Bandung
27 November 2025
15.00 WIB (UTC+7)

Pesik Kuningan	1–2	Persika 1951

Arcamanik Stadium, Bandung

Persika 1951 won 3–1 on aggregate.

25 November 2025
15.00 WIB (UTC+7)

Cimahi United	0–2	Persikotas Tasikmalaya

Arcamanik Stadium, Bandung
27 November 2025
13.00 WIB (UTC+7)

Persikotas Tasikmalaya	3–1	Cimahi United

Arcamanik Stadium, Bandung

Persikotas won 5–1 on aggregate.

=== Third place play-off ===
1 December 2025
09.00 WIB (UTC+7)

Pesik Kuningan	4–1	Cimahi United

Arcamanik Stadium, Bandung

=== Final ===
==== Summary ====
Team 1	Agg.	Team 2	1st leg	2nd leg
Persika 1951	1–2	Persikotas Tasikmalaya	0–0	1–2

==== Matches ====
29 November 2025
14.00 WIB (UTC+7)

Persika 1951	0–0	Persikotas Tasikmalaya

Arcamanik Stadium, Bandung
1 December 2025
14.00 WIB (UTC+7)

Persikotas Tasikmalaya	2–1	Persika 1951

Arcamanik Stadium, Bandung

Persikotas won 2–1 on aggregate.

== See also ==
- 2025–26 Liga 4
- 2025 Liga 4 West Java Series 2
