= 2021 Liga 3 West Java =

Tournament details
- Venue(s): Bekasi & Bandung Regency
- Dates: 4 December 2021 – 23 January 2022
- Teams: 22 teams in Series 1; 42 teams in Series 2

Final positions
- Champions: Persikab Bandung (1st title)
- Runners-up: Bandung United
- Third place: Persikasi Bekasi
- Fourth place: PCB Persipasi

The 2021 Liga 3 West Java (also known as Liga 3 MS Glow For Men PSSI Jawa Barat for sponsorship reason) will be the sixth season of Liga 3 West Java as a qualifying round for the national round of the 2021–22 Liga 3.

PSKC were the defending champion.

== Teams ==
=== Series 1 teams ===
There are 22 teams participated in the league Series 1 this season.

No.	Team	Location
01	Bandung United	Bandung
02	Benpica	Karawang Regency
03	Bintang Timur	Sukabumi Regency
04	Citeureup Raya	Bogor Regency
05	Depok City	Depok
06	Depok United	Depok
07	Kabomania Citra	Cimahi
08	Karawang United	Karawang Regency
09	Maung Anom	Bandung
10	PCB Persipasi	Bekasi
11	Persekabtas	Tasikmalaya Regency
12	Perses	Sumedang Regency
13	Persigar	Garut Regency
14	Persika	Karawang Regency
15	Persikab	Bandung Regency
16	Persikasi	Bekasi Regency
17	Persima	Majalengka Regency
18	Persipo	Purwakarta Regency
19	Persitas	Tasikmalaya Regency
20	Prima Con	Cimahi
21	PSGJ Cirebon	Cirebon Regency
22	PSGC	Ciamis Regency

=== Series 2 teams ===
There are 42 teams participated in the league Series 2 this season.

No.	Team	Location
01	Al Jabbar	Cirebon Regency
02	Bekasi United	Bekasi Regency
03	Bandung Barat United	West Bandung Regency
04	Bandung Legend	Bandung
05	Bandung Timur	Bandung Regency
06	BP Batalyon	Bandung Regency
07	Bina Pantura	Cirebon Regency
08	Blaster	Karawang Regency
09	Bone Putra	Bekasi
10	Buaran Putra	Bekasi
11	Cibinong Putra	Bogor Regency
12	Cirebon Barat	Cirebon Regency
13	Casturin	Bandung
14	Ebod Jaya	Cimahi
15	Inspire	Bandung Regency
16	Loreng Karawang	Karawang Regency
17	Mandala	Majalengka Regency
18	Mutiara 97	Bandung
19	Pakuan City	Bandung
20	Parma	Bandung Regency
21	Perkesit	Cianjur Regency
21	Persigarsel	Garut Regency
22		
23		
24		
25		
26		
27		
28		
29		
30		
31		
32		
33		
34		
35		
36		
37		
38		
39		
40		
41		
42		

== Series 1 ==
=== First round ===
Group A

Semua pertandingan dimainkan di Stadion Si Jalak Harupat, Soreang.

Pos	Team	Pld	W	D	L	GF	GA	GD	Pts	Qualification
1	Persikab (H)	5	5	0	0	23	4	+19	15	Qualified
2	Kabomania Citra	5	3	1	1	11	5	+6	10	Qualified
3	Perses	5	2	2	1	10	7	+3	8	
4	Persitas	5	2	1	2	9	7	+2	7	
5	Persigar	5	1	0	4	4	16	−12	3	
6	Persima	5	0	0	5	3	21	−18	0	Relegation

Source: Liga 3 2021 Jawa Barat
(H) Hosts

Group B

Semua pertandingan dimainkan di Stadion Si Jalak Harupat, Soreang.

Pos	Team	Pld	W	D	L	GF	GA	GD	Pts	Qualification
1	Bandung United	4	4	0	0	12	1	+11	12	Qualified
2	PSGC	4	3	0	1	8	3	+5	9	Qualified
3	Prima Con	4	2	0	2	5	3	+2	6	
4	Persekabtas	4	1	0	3	1	10	−9	3	
5	Maung Anom	4	0	0	4	0	9	−9	0	Relegation

Source: Liga 3 2021 Jawa Barat

Group C

Semua pertandingan dimainkan di Stadion Patriot Chandrabhaga, Bekasi.

Pos	Team	Pld	W	D	L	GF	GA	GD	Pts	Qualification
1	Persikasi	5	4	1	0	13	3	+10	13	Qualified
2	Karawang United	5	3	2	0	13	4	+9	11	Qualified
3	Depok United	5	3	1	1	14	9	+5	10	
4	Persipo	5	2	0	3	8	14	−6	6	
5	Depok City	5	1	0	4	14	14	0	3	
6	Benpica	5	0	0	5	3	21	−18	0	Relegation

Source: Liga 3 2021 Jawa Barat

Group D

Semua pertandingan dimainkan di Stadion Patriot Chandrabhaga, Bekasi.

Pos	Team	Pld	W	D	L	GF	GA	GD	Pts	Qualification
1	PCB Persipasi (H)	4	4	0	0	17	2	+15	12	Qualified
2	Citeureup Raya	4	3	0	1	11	8	+3	9	Qualified
3	Persika	4	2	0	2	12	7	+5	6	
4	Bintang Timur	4	1	0	3	7	15	−8	3	
5	PSGJ	4	0	0	4	2	17	−15	0	Relegation

Source: Liga 3 2021 Jawa Barat
(H) Hosts

=== Second round ===
Group E

Semua pertandingan dimainkan di Stadion Si Jalak Harupat, Soreang.

Pos	Team	Pld	W	D	L	GF	GA	GD	Pts	Qualification
1	Persikab (H)	3	2	1	0	7	2	+5	7	Qualified
2	Bandung United	3	2	0	1	6	2	+4	6	Qualified
3	PSGC	3	1	0	2	2	8	−6	3	
4	Kabomania Citra	3	0	1	2	0	3	−3	1	

Source: Liga 3 2021 Jawa Barat
(H) Hosts

Grup F

Semua pertandingan dimainkan di Stadion Patriot Chandrabhaga, Bekasi.

Pos	Team	Pld	W	D	L	GF	GA	GD	Pts	Qualification
1	PCB Persipasi (H)	3	2	1	0	6	3	+3	7	Qualified
2	Persikasi	3	2	1	0	4	2	+2	7	Qualified
3	Citeureup Raya	3	1	0	2	6	7	−1	3	
4	Karawang United	3	0	0	3	2	6	−4	0	

Source: Liga 3 2021 Jawa Barat
(H) Hosts

=== Knockout stage ===
Semifinals
E1	Persikab	2
F2	Persikasi	1
F1	PCB Persipasi	1
E2	Bandung United	2

Finals
Persikab (a.e.t)	2
Bandung United	0
Third place
Persikasi	2
PCB Persipasi	1

Semifinals

December 20, 2021
13.00 UTC+7

Persikab	2–1	Persikasi
Dwiki Mardiyanto 11, 28'	Report	Deka Muhammad 58'

Si Jalak Harupat Stadium, Bandung Regency
December 20, 2021
15.30 UTC+7

PCB Persipasi	1–2	Bandung United
M. Junior 88'	Report	Ilham Qolba 49, 109'

Si Jalak Harupat Stadium, Bandung Regency

Third place

December 22, 2021
13.00 UTC+7

Persikasi	2–1	PCB Persipasi
	Report

Si Jalak Harupat Stadium, Bandung Regency

Finals

December 22, 2021
15.30 UTC+7

Persikab	2–0	Bandung United
	Report

Si Jalak Harupat Stadium, Bandung Regency

== Venues ==
- Series 1:
  - Patriot Chandrabhaga Stadium, Bekasi
  - Si Jalak Harupat Stadium, Bandung Regency
- Series 2: TBD
