= 2024–25 Liga 4 West Java Series 1 =

Liga 4 West Java Series 1
- Season: 2024–25
- Dates: 17 December 2024 – 25 January 2025
- Champions: Cimahi Putra (1st title)
- Relegated: Persipo (withdrawn); Citeureup Raya; Mandala; Persikabbar
- National phase: Cimahi Putra; Persipu; Cimahi United; Pesik; Persikabumi; Persikasi
- Matches: 74
- Goals: 257 (3.47 per match)
- Biggest win: Persikabbar 2–12 Cimahi Putra (24 December 2024)
- Highest scoring: Persikabbar 2–12 Cimahi Putra (24 December 2024)

The 2024–25 Liga 4 West Java Series 1 was the inaugural season of Liga 4 West Java Series 1 after the structural changes of Indonesian football competition and serves as a qualifying round for the national phase of the 2024–25 Liga 4. The competition is organised by the West Java Provincial PSSI Association.

== Teams ==
=== Teams changes ===
The following teams changed division after the 2023–24 season.

From Series 1
▲ Promoted to Liga 2
- Dejan
- Persikas
▲ Qualified for Liga Nusantara
- Persipasi
- PSGC
Withdrawn teams
- ~~Depok City~~
- ~~PSGJ~~

To Series 1
▲ Promoted from Series 2
- ASAD Purwakarta
- Cimahi United
- Mandala
- Perkesit
- Persikabumi
- Persindra

Both Depok City and PSGJ have withdrawn from the league before the start of the season.

=== Participating teams ===
A total of 24 teams are competing in this season. The teams are divided into 4 blocks based on the geographical location of their homebase.

No	Team	Location	2023 season
Block 1
1	Bandung United	Bandung City	First round (3rd in Group D)
2	Cimahi Putra	Cimahi City	Second round (3rd in Group F)
3	Cimahi United	Cimahi City	Runner-up of S2 (promoted)
4	Ebod Jaya Cimahi	Cimahi City	First round (3rd in Group C)
5	Perses	Sumedang Regency	First round (6th in Group A)
6	Persikabbar	West Bandung Regency	First round (6th in Group C)
Block 2
7	Al Jabbar	Cirebon Regency	First round (4th in Group C)
8	Persigar	Garut Regency	Second round (4th in Group F)
9	Persindra	Indramayu Regency	4th place of S2 (promoted)
10	Pesik	Kuningan Regency	First round (3rd in Group A)
11	Mandala	Majalengka Regency	Play-offs runner-up (promoted)
12	Persima	Majalengka Regency	First round (4th in Group A)

No	Team	Location	2023 season
Block 3
13	PSB	Bogor City	First round (6th in Group B)
14	Citeureup Raya	Bogor Regency	First round (4th in Group B)
15	Perkesit	Cianjur Regency	Champion of S2 (promoted)
16	Depok Raya	Depok City	First round (5th in Group C)
17	Persipu	Depok City	Second round (4th in Group E)
18	Persikabumi	Sukabumi Regency	Play-offs winner (promoted)
Block 4
19	Persikasi	Bekasi Regency	First round (5th in Group B)
20	Karawang United	Karawang Regency	First round (5th in Group A)
21	Persika 1951	Karawang Regency	Second round (3rd in Group E)
22	Persipo	Purwakarta Regency	First round (4th in Group D)
23	ASAD Purwakarta	Purwakarta Regency	3rd place of S2 (promoted)
24	Persitas	Tasikmalaya Regency	First round (5th in Group D)

=== Personnel and kits ===
Note: Flags indicate national team as has been defined under FIFA eligibility rules. Players and coaches may hold more than one non-FIFA nationality.

Block 1

Team	Head coach	Captain	Kit manufacturer	Main kit sponsor	Other kit sponsor(s)
Bandung United	(Indonesia) Boy Jati Asmara		(Indonesia) Ereight	None	List: Front: None; Back: None; Sleeves: None; Shorts: None
Cimahi Putra			(Indonesia) 3N Sportwear	Cimahi Putra	List: Front: Back: Sleeves: Shorts:
Cimahi United	(Indonesia) Yadi Mulyadi		(Indonesia) N-Rush	Karya Prima Abadi	List: Front: Rumah Kiper, GR Apparel, PT Prima Karya Abadi Konstruksi, Ahdi Consultant; Back: CV Primacon, PT Niaga Guna Sarana, Yamazaki MyRoti, Soegiri Infini Arena; Sleeves: None; Shorts: None
Ebod Jaya Cimahi				APC	List: Front: None; Back: None; Sleeves: None; Shorts: None
Perses			(Indonesia) Maestro Sportwear	Nabati Group	List: Front: TGM99, Simaya, Hasna Utama; Back: Kicau Mania MHMC Ciparbuag; Sleeves: LPK HJS; Shorts: None
Persikabbar			(Indonesia) Made by club	Akademi Persikabbar	List: Front: None; Back: None; Sleeves: None; Shorts: None

Block 2

Team	Head coach	Captain	Kit manufacturer	Main kit sponsor	Other kit sponsor(s)
Al Jabbar			(Indonesia) Home Cloth	LPK ZEN	List: Front: Ototronik, Automotive; Back: SMK Al Jabbar, LPK ZEN; Sleeves: Shorts: LPK ZEN
Persigar	(Indonesia) Didin Gultom	(Indonesia) Rudi Hidayat	(Indonesia) SLEMN24	None	List: Front: None; Back: None; Sleeves: None; Shorts: None
Persindra	(Indonesia) Rici Vauzi	(Indonesia) Hendri Bow	(Indonesia) Izun Sport	Pertamina	List: Front: Ono Surono; Back: None; Sleeves: None; Shorts: None
Pesik	(Indonesia) Satria Nurzaman		(Indonesia) Fours	Nodeem	List: Front: RCB, Uma Racing, SHS Sinar Harapan; Back: None; Sleeves: None; Shorts: None
Mandala			(Indonesia) Dewok Industries	Ocan Sablon & Konveksi	List: Front: Dewok Industries, Aljun Management; Back: Arsen Owlhead, MSA Kuningan; Sleeves: None; Shorts: None
Persima	(Indonesia) Adi Putra Setiawan	(Indonesia) Wahyu Edo	(Indonesia) M67	Aljun Management	List: Front: Bank BJB; Back: Sleeves: Klinik Pratama Al-Huda; Shorts:

Block 3

Team	Head coach	Captain	Kit manufacturer	Main kit sponsor	Other kit sponsor(s)
PSB	(Indonesia) Akhsanul Viddin		(Indonesia) Eightysix Apparel	None	List: Front: None; Back: None; Sleeves: None; Shorts: None
Citeureup Raya			(Indonesia) Hattrick	Puspa Bangun Persada	List: Front: Indocement; Back: None; Sleeves: None; Shorts: None
Perkesit	(Indonesia) Alfi Fauzi Kamil		(Indonesia) Nandosport	Bris Trans	List: Front: Kickoff Soccer Style Barber, Bris Waterpark; Back: None; Sleeves: Bank BJB; Shorts: None
Depok Raya			(Indonesia) N-Rush	DK	List: Front: RedDoorz, Milo, Pradi Center; Back: Salonpas Gel, Bamed Health Care; Sleeves: Depok City Government; Shorts:
Persipu	(Indonesia) Hasnan Sungkar		(Indonesia) MJ Product	Balmerol Lubricants	List: Front: Big Bear Recording; Back: Bebas Cedera; Sleeves: STR Mini Soccer; Shorts: None
Persikabumi			(Indonesia) Eightysix Apparel	Persikabumi	List: Front: None; Back: None; Sleeves: None; Shorts: None

Block 4

Team	Head coach	Captain	Kit manufacturer	Main kit sponsor	Other kit sponsor(s)
Persikasi				None	List: Front: Back: Sleeves: Shorts:
Karawang United			(Indonesia) Twenty.co	JKW Building	List: Front: None; Back: Primaya Hospital; Sleeves: VAR Photo; Shorts: None
Persika 1951	(Indonesia) Heriyanto			None	List: Front: Back: Sleeves: Shorts:
Persipo					List: Front: Back: Sleeves: Shorts:
ASAD Purwakarta	(Indonesia) Fikry M Riyadh	(Indonesia) Yogi Kosasih	(Indonesia) Sans Apparel	None	List: Front: Purwakarta Regency Government, Purwakarta Regional Police; Back: None; Sleeves: Indomaret; Shorts: None
Persitas			(Indonesia) RM Apparel	Persitas Kabupaten Tasikmalaya	List: Front: Back: Sleeves: Shorts:

== Schedule ==
The schedule of the competition is as follows.

Round	Matchday	Date			
First round	—N/a	Group A	Group B	Group C	Group D
First round	Matchday 1	17 December 2024	18 December 2024	17 December 2024	
First round	Matchday 2	21 December 2024	22 December 2024	19 December 2024	
First round	Matchday 3	23 December 2024	26 December 2024	20 December 2024	
First round	Matchday 4	24 December 2024	31 December 2024	22 December 2024	
First round	Matchday 5	27 December 2024	3 January 2024	24 December 2024	
First round	Matchday 6	30 December 2024	—	26 December 2024	
First round	Matchday 7	2 January 2025	—	28 December 2024	30 December 2024
Second round
Second round	Matchday 1	6 January 2025			
Second round	Matchday 2	8 January 2025			
Second round	Matchday 3	10 January 2025			
Knockout round	Semi-finals	15 January (Leg 1) & 18 January 2025 (Leg 2)			
Knockout round	Third place play-off	25 January 2025			
Knockout round	Final	23 January (Leg 1) & 25 January 2025 (Leg 2)			

== First round ==
The draw for the first round took place on 17 November 2024 at the PSSI Secretariat of the West Java Provincial Association, Bandung. The 24 teams will be drawn into 4 groups of six based on the geographical location of their homebase. The first round will be played in a home tournament format of single round-robin matches.

The top two teams of each group will qualify for the second round, while the bottom-ranked team from each group will be relegated to the 2025–26 Series 2.

=== Group A ===
All matches will be held at Pusdikpom Soegiri Infini Arena, Cimahi.

Pos	Team	Pld	W	D	L	GF	GA	GD	Pts	Qualification or relegation	CUN	CPT	BUN	EBO	SUM	KBR
1	Cimahi United	5	5	0	0	16	1	+15	15	Qualification to the Second round	—	—	1–0	2–0	7–0	—
2	Cimahi Putra	5	3	1	1	18	6	+12	10	Qualification to the Second round	1–2	—	—	—	2–0	—
3	Bandung United	5	3	0	2	14	6	+8	9		—	2–3	—	3–2	—	7–0
4	Ebod Jaya Cimahi	5	2	1	2	7	6	+1	7		—	0–0	—	—	—	—
5	Perses	5	1	0	4	5	16	−11	3		—	—	0–2	1–2	—	4–3
6	Persikabbar (R)	5	0	0	5	5	30	−25	0	Relegation to the 2025–26 Series 2	0–4	2–12	—	0–3	—	—

Source: Series 1
Legend: Blue = home team win; Yellow = draw; Red = away team win.
Rules for classification: 1) Points; 2) Head-to-head points; 3) Head-to-head goal difference; 4) Head-to-head goals scored; 5) Goal difference; 6) Goals scored; 7) Fair-play points; 8) Draw.
(R) Relegated

Matches

Matchday 1 (17 December 2024)
17 December 2024
13.00 WIB (UTC+7)

Persikabbar	0–4	Cimahi United
	Report

Pusdikpom Soegiri Infini Arena, Cimahi
17 December 2024
15.15 WIB (UTC+7)

Perses	0–2	Bandung United
	Report

Pusdikpom Soegiri Infini Arena, Cimahi

Matchday 2 (21 December 2024)
21 December 2024
10.00 WIB (UTC+7)

Ebod Jaya Cimahi	0–0	Cimahi Putra
	Report

Pusdikpom Soegiri Infini Arena, Cimahi
21 December 2024
13.00 WIB (UTC+7)

Bandung United	7–0	Persikabbar
	Report

Pusdikpom Soegiri Infini Arena, Cimahi

Matchday 3 (23 December 2024)
23 December 2024
10.00 WIB (UTC+7)

Cimahi United	7–0	Perses
	Report

Pusdikpom Soegiri Infini Arena, Cimahi

Matchday 4 (24 December 2024)
24 December 2024
13.00 WIB (UTC+7)

Persikabbar	2–12	Cimahi Putra
	Report

Pusdikpom Soegiri Infini Arena, Cimahi
24 December 2024
15.15 WIB (UTC+7)

Bandung United	3–2	Ebod Jaya Cimahi
	Report

Pusdikpom Soegiri Infini Arena, Cimahi

Matchday 5 (27 December 2024)
27 December 2024
13.30 WIB (UTC+7)

Perses	1–2	Ebod Jaya Cimahi
	Report

Pusdikpom Soegiri Infini Arena, Cimahi
27 December 2024
15.30 WIB (UTC+7)

Cimahi Putra	1–2	Cimahi United
	Report

Pusdikpom Soegiri Infini Arena, Cimahi

Matchday 6 (30 December 2024)
30 December 2024
08.00 WIB (UTC+7)

Cimahi Putra	2–0	Perses

Pusdikpom Soegiri Infini Arena, Cimahi
30 December 2024
13.15 WIB (UTC+7)

Cimahi United	1–0	Bandung United

Pusdikpom Soegiri Infini Arena, Cimahi
30 December 2024
15.30 WIB (UTC+7)

Persikabbar	0–3	Ebod Jaya Cimahi

Pusdikpom Soegiri Infini Arena, Cimahi

Matchday 7 (2 January 2025)
2 January 2025
08.00 WIB (UTC+7)

Cimahi United	2–0	Ebod Jaya Cimahi
	Report

Pusdikpom Soegiri Infini Arena, Cimahi
2 January 2025
13.15 WIB (UTC+7)

Perses	4–3	Persikabbar
	Report

Pusdikpom Soegiri Infini Arena, Cimahi
2 January 2025
15.30 WIB (UTC+7)

Bandung United	2–3	Cimahi Putra
	Report

Pusdikpom Soegiri Infini Arena, Cimahi

=== Group B ===
All matches will be held at Pusdikpom Soegiri Infini Arena, Cimahi.

Pos	Team	Pld	W	D	L	GF	GA	GD	Pts	Qualification or relegation	KAS	TAS	KUN	KRW	ASA	PPO
1	Persikasi	4	4	0	0	11	2	+9	12	Qualification to the Second round	—	2–0	—	—	4–1	—
2	Persitas	4	2	1	1	7	4	+3	7	Qualification to the Second round	—	—	2–0	4–1	—	—
3	Karawang United	4	1	1	2	4	5	−1	4		0–2	—	—	—	4–1	—
4	Persika 1951	4	1	1	2	5	9	−4	4		1–3	—	0–0	—	—	—
5	ASAD Purwakarta	4	0	1	3	5	12	−7	1		—	1–1	—	2–3	—	—
6	Persipo (Note: Persipo announced their withdrawal from the competition due to the club's financial problems.) (W, R)	0	0	0	0	0	0	0	0	Withdrawn	—	—	—	—	—	—

Source: Series 1
Legend: Blue = home team win; Yellow = draw; Red = away team win.
Rules for classification: 1) Points; 2) Head-to-head points; 3) Head-to-head goal difference; 4) Head-to-head goals scored; 5) Goal difference; 6) Goals scored; 7) Fair-play points; 8) Draw.
(R) Relegated; (W) Withdraw from the competition
Notes:

Matches

Matchday 1 (18 December 2024)
18 December 2024
13.00 WIB (UTC+7)

ASAD Purwakarta	2–3	Persika 1951
	Report

Pusdikpom Soegiri Infini Arena, Cimahi
18 December 2024
15.15 WIB (UTC+7)

Karawang United	0–2	Persikasi
	Report

Pusdikpom Soegiri Infini Arena, Cimahi

Matchday 2 (22 December 2024)
22 December 2024
13.00 WIB (UTC+7)

ASAD Purwakarta	1–1	Persitas
	Report

Pusdikpom Soegiri Infini Arena, Cimahi
22 December 2024
15.00 WIB (UTC+7)

Persika 1951	0–0	Karawang United
	Report

Pusdikpom Soegiri Infini Arena, Cimahi

Matchday 3 (26 December 2024)
26 December 2024
13.00 WIB (UTC+7)

Persikasi	4–1	ASAD Purwakarta
	Report

Pusdikpom Soegiri Infini Arena, Cimahi
26 December 2024
15.00 WIB (UTC+7)

Persitas	4–1	Persika 1951
	Report

Pusdikpom Soegiri Infini Arena, Cimahi

Matchday 4 (31 December 2024)
31 December 2024
13.00 WIB (UTC+7)

Persika 1951	1–3	Persikasi

Pusdikpom Soegiri Infini Arena, Cimahi
31 December 2024
15.00 WIB (UTC+7)

Persitas	2–0	Karawang United

Pusdikpom Soegiri Infini Arena, Cimahi

Matchday 5 (3 January 2025)
3 January 2025
09.00 WIB (UTC+7)

Karawang United	4–1	ASAD Purwakarta
	Report

Pusdikpom Soegiri Infini Arena, Cimahi
3 January 2025
13.30 WIB (UTC+7)

Persikasi	2–0	Persitas
	Report

Pusdikpom Soegiri Infini Arena, Cimahi

=== Group C ===
All matches will be held at Mashud Wisnusaputra Stadium, Kuningan.

Pos	Team	Pld	W	D	L	GF	GA	GD	Pts	Qualification or relegation	KNG	PMA	IND	GAR	JAB	MFC
1	Pesik	5	5	0	0	10	1	+9	15	Qualification to the Second round	—	—	—	1–0	2–1	2–0
2	Persima	5	3	1	1	11	9	+2	10	Qualification to the Second round	0–2	—	3–2	2–2	—	—
3	Persindra	5	3	0	2	11	8	+3	9		0–3	—	—	2–0	—	4–0
4	Persigar	5	2	1	2	8	7	+1	7		—	—	—	—	—	3–1
5	Al Jabbar	5	1	0	4	9	12	−3	3		—	1–2	2–3	1–3	—	—
6	Mandala (R)	5	0	0	5	5	17	−12	0	Relegation to the 2025–26 Series 2	—	2–4	—	—	2–4	—

Source: Series 1
Legend: Blue = home team win; Yellow = draw; Red = away team win.
Rules for classification: 1) Points; 2) Head-to-head points; 3) Head-to-head goal difference; 4) Head-to-head goals scored; 5) Goal difference; 6) Goals scored; 7) Fair-play points; 8) Draw.
(R) Relegated

Matches

Matchday 1 (17 December 2024)
17 December 2024
13.00 WIB (UTC+7)

Persima	3–2	Persindra
	Report

Mashud Wisnusaputra Stadium, Kuningan
17 December 2024
15.15 WIB (UTC+7)

Pesik	2–1	Al Jabbar
	Report

Mashud Wisnusaputra Stadium, Kuningan

Matchday 2 (19 December 2024)
19 December 2024
13.00 WIB (UTC+7)

Persigar	3–1	Mandala
	Report

Mashud Wisnusaputra Stadium, Kuningan
19 December 2024
15.15 WIB (UTC+7)

Persindra	0–3	Pesik
	Report

Mashud Wisnusaputra Stadium, Kuningan

Matchday 3 (20 December 2024)
20 December 2024
15.00 WIB (UTC+7)

Al Jabbar	1–2	Persima
	Report

Mashud Wisnusaputra Stadium, Kuningan

Matchday 4 (22 December 2024)
22 December 2024
13.00 WIB (UTC+7)

Persindra	2–0	Persigar
	Report

Mashud Wisnusaputra Stadium, Kuningan
22 December 2024
15.15 WIB (UTC+7)

Pesik	2–0	Mandala
	Report

Mashud Wisnusaputra Stadium, Kuningan

Matchday 5 (24 December 2024)
24 December 2024
13.00 WIB (UTC+7)

Mandala	2–4	Al Jabbar
	Report

Mashud Wisnusaputra Stadium, Kuningan
24 December 2024
15.15 WIB (UTC+7)

Persima	2–2	Persigar
	Report

Mashud Wisnusaputra Stadium, Kuningan

Matchday 6 (26 December 2024)
26 December 2024
08.00 WIB (UTC+7)

Pesik	1–0	Persigar
	Report

Mashud Wisnusaputra Stadium, Kuningan
26 December 2024
13.15 WIB (UTC+7)

Al Jabbar	2–3	Persindra
	Report

Mashud Wisnusaputra Stadium, Kuningan
26 December 2024
15.30 WIB (UTC+7)

Mandala	2–4	Persima
	Report

Mashud Wisnusaputra Stadium, Kuningan

Matchday 7 (28 December 2024)
28 December 2024
08.00 WIB (UTC+7)

Al Jabbar	1–3	Persigar
	Report

Mashud Wisnusaputra Stadium, Kuningan
28 December 2024
13.15 WIB (UTC+7)

Persindra	4–0	Mandala
	Report

Mashud Wisnusaputra Stadium, Kuningan
28 December 2024
15.30 WIB (UTC+7)

Persima	0–2	Pesik
	Report

Mashud Wisnusaputra Stadium, Kuningan

=== Group D ===
All matches will be held at Merpati Stadium, Depok.

Pos	Team	Pld	W	D	L	GF	GA	GD	Pts	Qualification or relegation	PPU	BUM	PSB	DRY	PKT	CTR
1	Persipu	5	3	2	0	10	3	+7	11	Qualification to the Second round	—	2–1	—	2–2	3–0	—
2	Persikabumi	5	3	1	1	11	5	+6	10	Qualification to the Second round	—	—	2–1	—	0–0	3–1
3	PSB	5	2	2	1	8	6	+2	8		0–0	—	—	2–2	3–1	—
4	Depok Raya	5	1	3	1	8	11	−3	6		—	1–5	—	—	—	2–1
5	Perkesit	5	0	3	2	3	8	−5	3		—	—	—	1–1	—	—
6	Citeureup Raya (Note: Citeureup Raya was deducted three points by the PSSI West Java provincial association.) (R)	5	0	1	4	4	11	−7	−2	Relegation to the 2025–26 Series 2	0–3 (Note: The match was halted in the 80th minute with the score tied at Citeureup Raya 2–2 Persipu, as the Citeureup Raya team refused to continue playing. Subsequently, the PSSI West Java provincial association awarded a 3–0 victory to Persipu.)	—	1–2	—	1–1	—

Source: Series 1
Legend: Blue = home team win; Yellow = draw; Red = away team win.
Rules for classification: 1) Points; 2) Head-to-head points; 3) Head-to-head goal difference; 4) Head-to-head goals scored; 5) Goal difference; 6) Goals scored; 7) Fair-play points; 8) Draw.
(R) Relegated
Notes:

Matches

Matchday 1 (17 December 2024)
17 December 2024
13.00 WIB (UTC+7)

Citeureup Raya	1–2	PSB
	Report

Merpati Stadium, Depok
17 December 2024
15.15 WIB (UTC+7)

Persipu	2–1	Persikabumi
	Report

Merpati Stadium, Depok

Matchday 2 (19 December 2024)
19 December 2024
13.00 WIB (UTC+7)

Perkesit	1–1	Depok Raya
	Report

Merpati Stadium, Depok
19 December 2024
15.15 WIB (UTC+7)

PSB	0–0	Persipu
	Report

Merpati Stadium, Depok

Matchday 3 (20 December 2024)
20 December 2024
08.00 WIB (UTC+7)

Persikabumi	3–1	Citeureup Raya
	Report

Merpati Stadium, Depok

Matchday 4 (22 December 2024)
22 December 2024
13.00 WIB (UTC+7)

PSB	3–1	Perkesit
	Report

Merpati Stadium, Depok
22 December 2024
15.15 WIB (UTC+7)

Persipu	2–2	Depok Raya
	Report

Merpati Stadium, Depok

Matchday 5 (24 December 2024)
24 December 2024
13.00 WIB (UTC+7)

Citeureup Raya	1–1	Perkesit
	Report

Merpati Stadium, Depok
24 December 2024
15.15 WIB (UTC+7)

Depok Raya	1–5	Persikabumi
	Report

Merpati Stadium, Depok

Matchday 6 (26 December 2024)
26 December 2024
08.00 WIB (UTC+7)

Persikabumi	2–1	PSB
	Report

Merpati Stadium, Depok
26 December 2024
13.15 WIB (UTC+7)

Persipu	3–0	Perkesit
	Report

Merpati Stadium, Depok
26 December 2024
15.30 WIB (UTC+7)

Depok Raya	2–1	Citeureup Raya
	Report

Merpati Stadium, Depok

Matchday 7 (30 December 2024)
30 December 2024
08.00 WIB (UTC+7)

PSB	2–2	Depok Raya

Merpati Stadium, Depok
30 December 2024
13.15 WIB (UTC+7)

Persikabumi	0–0	Perkesit

Merpati Stadium, Depok
30 December 2024
15.30 WIB (UTC+7)

Citeureup Raya	0–3 Awarded (Note: The match was halted in the 80th minute with the score tied at Citeureup Raya 2–2 Persipu, as the Citeureup Raya team refused to continue playing. Subsequently, the PSSI West Java provincial association awarded a 3–0 victory to Persipu.)	Persipu

Merpati Stadium, Depok

== Second round ==
The top eight teams from the first round will be divided into 2 groups of four teams. The second round will be played in a home tournament format of single round-robin matches.

The top two teams of each group will advance to the knockout round, while the top three teams will qualify for the national phase.

=== Group E ===
All matches will be held at Mashud Wisnusaputra Stadium and Ibrahim Adjie Stadium, Kuningan.

Pos	Team	Pld	W	D	L	GF	GA	GD	Pts	Qualification	KNG	CUN	BUM	TAS
1	Pesik	3	3	0	0	7	4	+3	9	Qualification to the Knockout round & national phase	—	—	3–2	—
2	Cimahi United	3	1	1	1	3	2	+1	4	Qualification to the Knockout round & national phase	1–2	—	—	0–0
3	Persikabumi	3	1	0	2	5	6	−1	3	Qualification to the national phase	—	0–2	—	—
4	Persitas	3	0	1	2	2	5	−3	1		1–2	—	1–3	—

Source: Series 1
Legend: Blue = home team win; Yellow = draw; Red = away team win.
Rules for classification: 1) Points; 2) Head-to-head points; 3) Head-to-head goal difference; 4) Head-to-head goals scored; 5) Goal difference; 6) Goals scored; 7) Fair-play points; 8) Draw.

Matches

Matchday 1 (6 January 2025)
6 January 2025
13.00 WIB (UTC+7)

Cimahi United	0–0	Persitas
	Report

Mashud Wisnusaputra Stadium, Kuningan
6 January 2025
15.00 WIB (UTC+7)

Pesik	3–2	Persikabumi
	Report

Mashud Wisnusaputra Stadium, Kuningan

Matchday 2 (8 January 2025)
8 January 2025
13.00 WIB (UTC+7)

Persikabumi	0–2	Cimahi United
	Report

Mashud Wisnusaputra Stadium, Kuningan
8 January 2025
15.20 WIB (UTC+7)

Persitas	1–2	Pesik
	Report

Mashud Wisnusaputra Stadium, Kuningan

Matchday 3 (10 January 2025)
10 January 2025
15.00 WIB (UTC+7)

Cimahi United	1–2	Pesik
	Report

Mashud Wisnusaputra Stadium, Kuningan
10 January 2025
15.00 WIB (UTC+7)

Persitas	1–3	Persikabumi
	Report

Ibrahim Adjie Stadium, Kuningan

=== Group F ===
All matches will be held at Merpati Stadium and Mahakam Stadium, Depok.

Pos	Team	Pld	W	D	L	GF	GA	GD	Pts	Qualification	CPT	PPU	KAS	PMA
1	Cimahi Putra	3	2	1	0	5	1	+4	7	Qualification to the Knockout round & national phase	—	1–1	—	2–0
2	Persipu	3	2	1	0	5	3	+2	7	Qualification to the Knockout round & national phase	—	—	—	3–2
3	Persikasi	3	1	0	2	2	4	−2	3	Qualification to the national phase	0–2	0–1	—	—
4	Persima	3	0	0	3	3	7	−4	0		—	—	1–2	—

Source: Series 1
Legend: Blue = home team win; Yellow = draw; Red = away team win.
Rules for classification: 1) Points; 2) Head-to-head points; 3) Head-to-head goal difference; 4) Head-to-head goals scored; 5) Goal difference; 6) Goals scored; 7) Fair-play points; 8) Draw.

Matches

Matchday 1 (6 January 2025)
6 January 2025
13.00 WIB (UTC+7)

Persikasi	0–2	Cimahi Putra
	Report

Merpati Stadium, Depok
6 January 2025
15.00 WIB (UTC+7)

Persipu	3–2	Persima
	Report

Merpati Stadium, Depok

Matchday 2 (8 January 2025)
8 January 2025
13.00 WIB (UTC+7)

Cimahi Putra	1–1	Persipu
	Report

Merpati Stadium, Depok
8 January 2025
15.00 WIB (UTC+7)

Persima	1–2	Persikasi
	Report

Merpati Stadium, Depok

Matchday 3 (10 January 2025)
10 January 2025
15.00 WIB (UTC+7)

Persikasi	0–1	Persipu
	Report

Merpati Stadium, Depok
10 January 2025
15.00 WIB (UTC+7)

Cimahi Putra	2–0	Persima
	Report

Mahakam Stadium, Depok

== Knockout round ==
Each tie in the knockout round, apart from the third place play-off is played over two legs, with each team playing one leg at home. The team that scores more goals on aggregate over the two legs advances to the next round (the away goals rule is not applied). If the aggregate score is level, the winners are decided by a penalty shoot-out. In the final, which is played as a single match, if the score is level at the end of normal time, a penalty shoot-out is played.

=== Bracket ===
Semi-finals
E1	Pesik	4	1	5
F2	Persipu	1	5	6
F1	Cimahi Putra	2	2	4
E2	Cimahi United	0	1	1

Final
Persipu	1	0	1
Cimahi Putra	5	3	8
Third place play-off
Pesik	1
Cimahi United	4

=== Semi-finals ===
==== Summary ====
The first legs will be played on 15 January, and the second legs will be played on 18 January 2025.

Team 1	Agg.	Team 2	1st leg	2nd leg
Pesik	5–6	Persipu	4–1	1–5
Cimahi Putra	4–1	Cimahi United	2–0	2–1

==== Matches ====
15 January 2025
15.00 WIB (UTC+7)

Pesik	4–1	Persipu
	Report

Mashud Wisnusaputra Stadium, Kuningan
18 January 2025
15.00 WIB (UTC+7)

Persipu	5–1	Pesik
	Report

Merpati Stadium, Depok

Persipu won 6–5 on aggregate.

15 January 2025
15.00 WIB (UTC+7)

Cimahi Putra	2–0	Cimahi United
	Report

Sangkuriang Stadium, Cimahi
18 January 2025
15.00 WIB (UTC+7)

Cimahi United	1–2	Cimahi Putra
	Report

Sangkuriang Stadium, Cimahi

Cimahi Putra won 4–1 on aggregate.

=== Third place play-off ===
25 January 2025
12.00 WIB (UTC+7)

Pesik	1–4	Cimahi United
	Report

Jalak Harupat Stadium, Bandung

=== Final ===
==== Summary ====
The first legs will be played on 23 January, and the second legs will be played on 25 January 2025.

Team 1	Agg.	Team 2	1st leg	2nd leg
Persipu	1–8	Cimahi Putra	1–5	0–3

==== Matches ====
23 January 2025
15.00 WIB (UTC+7)

Persipu	1–5	Cimahi Putra
	Report

Merpati Stadium, Depok
25 January 2025
14.30 WIB (UTC+7)

Cimahi Putra	3–0	Persipu
	Report

Jalak Harupat Stadium, Bandung

Cimahi Putra won 8–1 on aggregate.

== See also ==
- 2024–25 Liga 4
- 2024 Liga 4 West Java Series 2
