= 2020 Liga 3 West Java Series 1 =

Tournament details
- Dates: October-TBD 2020
- Teams: 21

The 2020 Liga 3 West Java Series 1 would be the fifth editions of Liga 3 (formerly known as Liga Nusantara) as a qualifying round for the national round of 2020 Liga 3. But cancelled due to the COVID-19 pandemic in Indonesia.

PSKC Cimahi, winner of the 2019 Liga 3 West Java Series 1 are the defending champions also promoted to 2020 Liga 2 after being runner-up of 2019 Liga 3. The competition begin in October 2020.

== Teams ==
=== Team changes ===
Promoted to Liga 2

- PSKC Cimahi

Relegated from Liga 2

- Bandung United
- PSGC Ciamis

Transferred from Pre-national Route

- Persika

Promoted from Series 2

- Bareti 1698
- Galuh
- Persigar Garut

Relegated to Series 2

- Bintang Muda
- PSIT Cirebon
- Sultan Muda

=== Stadium and Location ===
Team	Location	Stadium	Capacity
Bandung United	Bandung	Siliwangi	15,000
Bareti 1698	Subang	Berdikari	2,000
Benpica	Karawang	Singaperbangsa	20,000
Bintang Timur	Sukabumi	Korpri	10,000
Citeureup Raya	Bogor Regency	Persikabo	15,000
Galuh	Ciamis	Galuh	25,000
Kabomania	Bogor Regency	Persikabo	15,000
Maung Anom	Bandung	Arcamanik	5,000
Patriot CB	Bekasi	Patriot Candrabhaga	28,000
Persebam Bogor	Bogor Regency	Persikabo	15,000
Perses Sumedang	Sumedang	Ahmad Yani	10,000
Persigar Garut	Garut	Jayaraga	10,000
Persika Karawang	Karawang	Singaperbangsa	20,000
Persikab Bandung	Bandung Regency	Si Jalak Harupat	40,000
Persikasi Bekasi	Bekasi Regency	Wibawa Mukti	30,000
Persipo Purwakarta	Purwakarta	Purnawarman	10,000
Persitas Tasikmalaya	Tasikmalaya Regency	Wiradadaha	10,000
Prima Con	Cimahi	Sangkuriang	5,000
PSGC Ciamis	Ciamis	Galuh	25,000
PSGJ Cirebon	Cirebon Regency	Bima	15,000
Play-off winner	TBD	TBD	TBD

== See also ==
- 2020 Liga 3 West Java Series 2
