= 2017 Liga 3 West Java =

Liga 3 West Java
- Season: 2017

The 2017 Liga 3 West Java is the third edition of Liga 3 West Java as a qualifying round for the national round of 2017 Liga 3.

The competition scheduled starts on August 9, 2017.

== Round and draw dates ==
The schedule will be follows.

| Round | Draw date | Match date |
|---|---|---|
| First Round | 16 June 2017 | 9-16 August 2017 |
| Second Round | To be confirmed | 23-30 August 2017 |
| Third Round | To be confirmed | 3-6 September 2017 |
| Quarter-finals | To be confirmed | 9-10 September 2017 |
| Semi-finals | To be confirmed | 12 September 2017 |
| Final | To be confirmed | 14 September 2017 |

== Teams ==
There are 46 clubs which will participate the league in this season.

Group A
PSIT Cirebon
PSGJ Cirebon
Persima Majalengka
Al-Jabbar
Persindra Indramayu
Bina Putra

Group B
Persigar Garut
Persikotas Tasikmalaya
Perses Sumedang
Mandala Majalengka
Putra Jaya
Persitas Tasikmalaya

Group C
Tajama
Depok United
Persebam Babakan Madang
PSB Bogor
Gapura

Group D
Sukabumi 28
Bintang Timur
Kabomania
Persikabumi Sukabumi
Tiki Taka

Group E
Persikab Bandung
Saint Prima
Parma
Bandung Timur
Super Progresif
Maung Bandung

Group F
Bandung Barat United
Maung Anom
Roksi
Sultan Muda
Carsurin
PS UNI Bandung

Group G
Benpica
Persipasi Bekasi
Persikas Subang
Persipo Purwakarta
Blasters Kujang
Loreng

Group H
Persikasi Bekasi
Young Tigers
Patriot Candrabhaga
Football Plus
PSKC Cimahi
Bintang Primavera
