= 2026–27 Liga Nusantara =

Liga Nusantara
- Season: 2026–27
- Dates: 13 November 2026 – TBA

The 2026–27 Liga Nusantara is the upcoming third season of the Liga Nusantara under its current name and the 11th season under its current league structure. The season is scheduled to begin on 13 November 2026.

== Overview ==
=== General ===
24 teams will compete in the league – the fifteen teams from the previous season, three teams relegated from the Championship and six teams promoted from Liga 4.

==== Teams promoted to Championship ====
Dejan and RANS Nusantara immediately returned after spending one season in the third division by reaching the final round on 3 February 2026. In the semifinal round, Dejan defeated PSGC while RANS Nusantara managed to defeat Persiba Bantul.

PSGC became the last team to be promoted after spending six seasons in the third division by defeating Persiba Bantul on penalties in the promotion playoff held on 7 February 2026.

==== Teams relegated from Championship ====
Sriwijaya became the first team to be relegated and competed in the third division for the first time after losing to Sumsel United on 28 February 2026. Donggala United (formerly Persipal) became the second team to be relegated where on 12 April 2026 they suffered a defeat to Deltras and competed in the third division for the first time as the current entity (through the acquisition of Muba Babel United in the 2022–23 season).

Persekat became the last team to be relegated after losing to Persiba Balikpapan in the relegation playoff held on 8 May 2026, and returned to the third division after six seasons in the second division.

==== Teams promoted from Liga 4 ====
PSN became the first team to be promoted after defeating Persibangga in the second matchweek of the fourth round of the national phase on 2 July 2026. This result made PSN will compete for the first time in the third division in the team's history.

Persipani, Pesik, and Pasuruan United were the next three teams promoted, each with results from the same matchweek. Persipani and Pesik drew 0–0, while Pasuruan United defeated Persigar. Pesik and Pasuruan United will debut in the third division as the current league name, while Persipani returns to the third division after a season-long absence due to their disqualification from the 2024–25 season.

Persinga and Persibangga were the final two teams promoted in the final matchweek of the fourth round of the national phase on 5 July 2026. Persinga held PSN to a goalless draw, while Persibangga defeated Unaaha. Both teams will compete in their debut season in the third division under the current name and league structure.

==== Teams relegated to Liga 4 ====
Persewar and Persikabo 1973 were relegated to their respective provincial Liga 4 after both withdrew before the league began. Persewar was relegated to Liga 4 Papua and Persikabo 1973 was relegated to Liga 4 West Java Series 1.

Perserang and Waanal Brothers were relegated after finishing bottom of their respective groups on 25 January 2026. Perserang was relegated to Liga 4 Banten after two seasons in the third division while Waanal Brothers was relegated to Liga 4 Central Papua after four seasons in the third division.

Persebata and PSDS became the last two teams to be relegated after spending one and two seasons respectively in the third division in the relegation playoffs on 1 February 2026. Persebata was relegated to Liga 4 East Nusa Tenggara after lost to Persikutim United, while PSDS was relegated to Liga 4 North Sumatra after defeat to Persitara.

== Teams ==
=== Changes ===
The following teams changed division since the 2025–26 season.

To Liga Nusantara
▼ Relegated from Championship
- Sriwijaya (Note: Withderw petition.)
- Donggala United (Note: Formerly Persipal.)
- Persekat
▲ Promoted from Liga 4
- Pasuruan United
- Persibangga
- Persinga
- Persipani
- Pesik
- PSN

From Liga Nusantara
▲ Promoted to Championship
- RANS Nusantara
- Dejan
- PSGC
▼ Relegated to Liga 4
- Persewar (Note: Withdrew from the competition at previous season.)
- Persikabo 1973
- Persebata
- Perserang
- PSDS
- Waanal Brothers

=== Name changes and relocated teams ===
I-League general director Ferry Paulus said that any club that violated any of the seven aspects in the club licensing cycle, e.g. relocating their home base, would be deducted one point.

- Persinab has removed Sang Maestro from its official name and changed back its full name to Persinab Nabire starting this season, having previously acquired Sang Maestro to compete in the 2025–26 season.
- Nusantara Lampung's license to play in the league was acquired by Liga 4 side Persikotas Tasikmalaya. As a result, Persikotas took over Nusantara Lampung's place in Liga Nusantara starting this season and they will compete under name Persikotas Nusantara.
- Persipal changed their official name to Donggala United and relocated to Donggala Regency.
- Tri Brata Rafflesia changed their official name to Putra Sang Fajar and relocated to Blitar.

=== Teams by province ===
Number	Province	Team(s)
6	East Java	Gresik United, Pasuruan United, Persekabpas, Persibo, Persinga, and Putra Sang Fajar
4	Central Java	Persekat, Persibangga, Persika Karanganyar, and Persipa
2	Central Papua	Persinab and Persipani
2	Jakarta	Batavia and Persitara
2	West Java	Pesik and Persikotas Nusantara
1	Bali	Perseden
1	Banten	Persikota
1	Central Sulawesi	Donggala United
1	East Kalimantan	Persikutim United
1	East Nusa Tenggara	PSN
1	Riau	Pekanbaru
1	South Sumatra	Sriwijaya
1	Special Region of Yogyakarta	Persiba Bantul

=== Location and stadiums ===
Locations of teams in the 2026–27 Liga Nusantara.
Red: Group A; Blue: Group B; Green: Group C
Locations of teams in the 2026–27 Liga Nusantara from Java region.
Red: Group A; Blue: Group B; Green: Group C

Team	Location	Stadium	Capacity	2025–26 season
Batavia	South Jakarta	Kebo Giro, at Boyolali (Note: Because Soemantri Brodjonegoro Stadium is being used for both the 2026 Jakarta Provincial Sports Week and the 2026 Jakarta Provincial Students Sports Week, and does not meet league requirements, Batavia will play their home matches at Kebo Giro Stadium in Boyolali.)	12,000	Quarter-finalist
Donggala United^{↓}	Donggala	Kebo Giro, at Boyolali (Note: Due to the lack of available stadiums in Donggala, Donggala United will play their home matches at Kebo Giro Stadium in Boyolali.)	12,000	10th in Championship Group 2
Gresik United	Gresik	Gelora Joko Samudro	25,000	4th in Group D
Pasuruan United^{↑}	Pasuruan	UNS, at Surakarta (Note: Pasuruan United will play their home games from UNS Stadium in Surakarta due to major renovation works at R. Soedarsono Stadium.)	TBD	Liga 4 champions
Pekanbaru	Pekanbaru	Hang Tuah	5,000	Quarter-finalist
Perseden	Denpasar	Ngurah Rai	12,000	3rd in Group D
Persekabpas	Pasuruan	Pasiran, at Surabaya (Note: Persekabpas will play their home games from Pasiran Field in Surabaya due to major renovation works at R. Soedarsono Stadium.)	1,500	Quarter-finalist
Persekat^{↓}	Tegal	Tri Sanja	10,000	Championship relegation play-off loser
Persiba Bantul	Bantul	Sultan Agung	30,000	4th
Persibangga^{↑}	Purbalingga	Tri Sanja, at Tegal (Note: Due to Goentoer Darjono Stadium not meeting the league requirements, Persibangga will play their home matches at Tri Sanja Stadium in Tegal.)	10,000	3rd in Liga 4 NP R4 Group B
Persibo	Bojonegoro	Letjen Haji Sudirman	15,000	3rd in Group C
Persika Karanganyar	Karanganyar	Manahan, at Surakarta (Note: Due to Angkatan 45 Stadium not meeting the league requirements, Persika Karanganyar will play their home matches at Manahan Stadium in Surakarta.)	25,000	Quarter-finalist
Persikota	Tangerang	Benteng Reborn	7,500	3rd in Group B
Persikotas Nusantara	Tasikmalaya	Galuh, at Ciamis (Note: Due to Wiradadaha Stadium not meeting the league requirements, Persikotas Nusantara will play their home matches at Galuh Stadium in Ciamis.)	20,000	3rd in Group A
Persikutim United	East Kutai	Kudungga	10,000	Relegation play-off winner
Persinab	Nabire	Brawijaya, at Kediri (Note: Due to Siriwini Field not meeting the league requirements, Persinab will play their home matches at Brawijaya Stadium in Kediri.)	10,000	4th in Group C
Persinga^{↑}	Ngawi	Ketonggo	10,000	Liga 4 semi-finalist
Persipa	Pati	Moch. Soebroto, at Magelang (Note: Because league regulations prohibit the use of artificial pitches, Persipa will play their home matches at Moch. Soebroto Stadium in Magelang instead of Joyokusumo Stadium in Pati.)	30,000	4th in Group A
Persipani^{↑}	Paniai	Gelora Bangkalan, at Bangkalan (Note: Due to Soeharto Field not meeting the league requirements, Persipani will play their home matches at Gelora Bangkalan Stadium in Bangkalan.)	15,000	3rd in Liga 4 NP R4 Group A
Persitara	North Jakarta	Wibawa Mukti, at Bekasi (Note: Because league regulations prohibit the use of artificial pitches, Persitara will play their home matches at Wibawa Mukti Stadium in Bekasi instead of Tugu Stadium in North Jakarta.)	30,000	Relegation play-off winner
Pesik^{↑}	Kuningan	Kebo Giro, at Boyolali (Note: Pesik will play their home games from Kebo Giro Stadium in Boyolali due to major renovation works at Mashud Wisnusaputra Stadium.)	12,000	Liga 4 runners-up
PSN^{↑}	Ngada	Gelora Joko Samudro, at Gresik (Note: Due to Lebijaga Stadium not meeting the league requirements, PSN will play their home matches at Gelora Joko Samudro Stadium in Gresik.)	5,000	Liga 4 semi-finalist
Putra Sang Fajar	Blitar	Gelora Supriyadi	15,000	4th in Group B
Sriwijaya^{↓}	Palembang	Bumi Sriwijaya	6,000	10th in Championship Group 1

^{↓}	Relegated from the Championship
^{↑}	Promoted from the Liga 4

League notes:
- NP R4: National phase fourth round
Location notes:

=== Personnel and kits ===
Note: Flags indicate national team as has been defined under FIFA eligibility rules. Players may hold more than one non-FIFA nationality. No foreign coaches are allowed.

Team	Manager	Captain	Kit manufacturer	Kit sponsors	
Team	Manager	Captain	Kit manufacturer	Main	Other(s)
Batavia	(Indonesia national football team) Charis Yulianto	(Indonesia national football team) Fahad Abdullah	(Indonesia) Nine	PSF Group	List: Front: None; Back: Jaga Sport, Primaya Hospital; Sleeves: None; Shorts: None
Donggala United	(Indonesia national football team) Ridwan Saragih	(Indonesia national football team) Alif Rizky	(Indonesia) RMB Apparel	Bank Sulteng	List: Front: RMP Indonesia; Back: A Management; Sleeves: None; Shorts: None
Gresik United	(Indonesia national football team) Joko Susilo	(Indonesia national football team) Abanda Rahman	(Indonesia) RMB Apparel	AQUVIVA	List: Front: Phonska Plus; Back: GUS Apparel, Wilmar; Sleeves: Akbar Arena, RSUD Ibnu Sina; Shorts: None
Pasuruan United	(Indonesia national football team) Subangkit	(Indonesia national football team) Saifullah	(Indonesia) RMB Apparel	PT Asli Juara Indonesia	List: Front: Bajoo; Back: Kopi Langit 81 Trans, PT Farhan Afifa Bersaudara, DS SoccerField; Sleeves: CV Farhan Anugerah Bersama; Shorts: None
Pekanbaru	(Indonesia national football team) Supardi Nasir	(Indonesia national football team) Hendra Saputra	(Indonesia) RMB Apparel	Trima+	List: Front: None; Back: Pemerintah Kota Pekanbaru; Sleeves: di.EL Coffee & Space; Shorts: None
Perseden	(Indonesia national football team) F.X. Yanuar	(Indonesia national football team) I Made Antha Wijaya	(Indonesia) 1919	éL Hotel	List: Front: Bank BPD Bali; Back: None; Sleeves: None; Shorts: None
Persekabpas	(Indonesia national football team) Bio Paulin	(Indonesia national football team) Beto Gonçalves	(Indonesia) RMB Apparel	MAB Dairy Farm	List: Front: Kopi Langit 81 Trans, Buana Paper, DS SoccerField, AQUVIVA; Back: Satoria Pharma, PT Surabaya Aluminium Industry; Sleeves: RSUD Bangil; Shorts: None
Persekat	(Indonesia national football team) Agus Riyanto	(Indonesia national football team) Muhammad Firman	(Indonesia) Orlin	Ersal Aburizal	List: Front: CANSH, Adidaya Karya, Tegal Road Construction; Back: Tegal Sport Center, Donga Mane Energy, Rumah Sakit Harapan Sehat, Teh Dandang, Agung Sebayu Gas; Sleeves: Ghiyats Mulia Foundation, MerahPutih Advertising, Bhamada University; Shorts: None
Persiba Bantul	(Indonesia national football team) Susanto	(Indonesia national football team) Antoni Nugroho	(Indonesia) Almer Apparel	Muncul Group	List: Front: Sedayu General Hospital, Bintang Galaxy Football Academy; Back: Sleman City Hall, Cheers Air Mineral; Sleeves: Sayur Online Bantul; Shorts: None
Persibangga	(Indonesia national football team) Mochammad Irfan	(Indonesia national football team) Ilham Irhaz	(Indonesia) Kubangga^{1}	The Samringah WisEd	List: Front: Javacafe; Back: None; Sleeves: None; Shorts: None
Persibo	(Indonesia national football team) I Putu Gede	(Indonesia national football team) Crah Angger	(Indonesia) PGRPN	balé by BTN	List: Front: Realfood; Back: None; Sleeves: PT ADS BUMD Bojonegoro, Hotel Griya MCM; Shorts: None
Persika Karanganyar	(Indonesia national football team) Taufiq Kasrun	(Indonesia national football team) Rio Saputro	(Indonesia) Amrta	None	List: Front: None; Back: None; Sleeves: Cleo Pure Water; Shorts: None
Persikota	(Indonesia national football team) Firmansyah	(Indonesia national football team) Reksa Maulana	(Indonesia) RANK Sports	Moya	List: Front: PT Air Kota Tangerang, Gajah Tunggal; Back: Tangerang LIVE; Sleeves: None; Shorts: None
Persikotas Nusantara	(Indonesia national football team) Ridwan Oesman	(Indonesia national football team) Rezavi	(Indonesia) Zestien	SIMPATI	List: Front: Bank BJB, Careguard; Back: None; Sleeves: Miasso, MUJ Energi Lestari; Shorts: None
Persikutim United	(Indonesia national football team) Syafril Usman	(Indonesia national football team) Muhammad Taufiq	(Indonesia) Abang Sport	Kaltim Prima Coal	List: Front: None; Back: None; Sleeves: None; Shorts: None
Persinab	(Indonesia national football team) Masdra Nurriza	(Indonesia national football team) Samuel Yobe	(Indonesia) Arafs Apparel	Persinab F.C.	List: Front: None; Back: RS Muhammadiyah Ahmad Dahlan Kediri, Arafs Apparel; Sleeves: None; Shorts: None
Persinga	(Indonesia national football team) Didin Gultom	(Indonesia national football team) Dimas Galih Gumilang	(Indonesia) ADSport	Nata Azana Hotel Ngawi	List: Front: Daya Tani Sembada; Back: Mas Antok DRJ, Andri Bolang, JConnect; Sleeves: Akeo Demineral, Indonesian NICU PICU Update, Bless Bakery; Shorts: None
Persipa	(Indonesia national football team) Salahudin	(Indonesia national football team) Iqbal Al Ghuzat	(Indonesia) Nine	Bank Mandiri	List: Front: PSF Group, Universitas Safin Pati; Back: None; Sleeves: None; Shorts: None
Persipani	(Indonesia national football team) Muhammad Azhar	(Indonesia national football team) Jems Edowai	(Indonesia) Zestien	Anak Negeri Paniai	List: Front: None; Back: None; Sleeves: None; Shorts: None
Persitara	(Indonesia national football team) Mohamad Firdaus	(Indonesia national football team) Yadi Mulyadi	(Indonesia) Ereight	Pelindo	List: Front: Forum RT-RW DKI Jakarta; Back: None; Sleeves: None; Shorts: None
Pesik	(Indonesia national football team) Mochammad Fachrudin	(Indonesia national football team) Daud Kotulus	(Indonesia) RMB Apparel	None	List: Front: None; Back: None; Sleeves: Bank BJB; Shorts: None
PSN	(Indonesia national football team) Patrick Domal	(Indonesia national football team) Richardus Bhara	(Indonesia) Elsport	Sombra Coffee	List: Front: Student Center UNESA, Bank NTT; Back: None; Sleeves: None; Shorts: None
Putra Sang Fajar	(Indonesia national football team) Agus Sugeng	(Indonesia national football team) Firmansyah	(Indonesia) Mills	Putra Sang Fajar	List: Front: None; Back: jagahutan.id; Sleeves: None; Shorts: None
Sriwijaya	Withdrew				

1. Apparel made by club.

=== Coaching changes ===
==== Pre-season ====
Team	Outgoing head coach	Manner of departure	Date of vacancy	Replaced by	Date of appointment
Persiba Bantul	(Indonesia) Andri Ramawi	Signed by PSIS	14 February 2026	(Indonesia) Susanto	19 September 2026
Persipa	(Indonesia) Eduard Tjong	End of caretaker role	28 February 2026	(Indonesia) Salahudin	15 September 2026
Persika Karanganyar	(Indonesia) Ahmad Bustomi	Signed by Indonesia U-17	4 July 2026	(Indonesia) Taufiq Kasrun	3 September 2026
Perseden	(Indonesia) I Wayan Arsana	Signed by Kendal Tornado	10 July 2026	(Indonesia) F.X. Yanuar	30 September 2026
Pasuruan United	(Indonesia) Bio Paulin	Signed by Persekabpas	12 July 2026	(Indonesia) Subangkit	12 July 2026
Persekabpas	(Indonesia) Masdra Nurriza	End of contract	12 July 2026	(Indonesia) Bio Paulin	12 July 2026
Gresik United	(Indonesia) Andik Ardiansyah	Demoted to assistant	22 July 2026	(Indonesia) Joko Susilo	22 July 2026
Persikotas Nusantara	(Indonesia) Ismed Sofyan	Change in club ownership	31 July 2026	(Indonesia) Ridwan Oesman	4 November 2026
Donggala United	(Indonesia) Kamaludin	End of contract	15 August 2026	(Indonesia) Ridwan Saragih	15 August 2026
Pekanbaru	(Indonesia) Miskardi	End of contract	7 September 2026	(Indonesia) Supardi Nasir	10 September 2026
Persinga	(Indonesia) Slamet Riadi	Signed by Persebi	8 September 2026	(Indonesia) Didin Gultom	15 September 2026
Persikota	(Indonesia) Didin Gultom	Signed by Persinga	15 September 2026	(Indonesia) Firmansyah	23 October 2026
Pesik	(Indonesia) Dian Oktovery	End of contract	17 September 2026	(Indonesia) Mochammad Fachrudin	17 September 2026
Persekat	(Indonesia) I Putu Gede	Signed by Persibo	18 September 2026	(Indonesia) Agus Riyanto	11 November 2026
Persibo	(Indonesia) Alfiat	End of contract	18 September 2026	(Indonesia) I Putu Gede	18 September 2026
Persipani	(Indonesia) Jimmy Saputro	End of contract	26 September 2026	(Indonesia) Muhammad Azhar	2 October 2026
Persinab	(Indonesia) Irwansyah	End of contract	3 October 2026	(Indonesia) Masdra Nurriza	3 October 2026
Persitara	(Indonesia) Robby Darwis	End of contract	29 October 2026	(Indonesia) Mohamad Firdaus	29 October 2026
Putra Sang Fajar	(Indonesia) M. Nasir	Change in club ownership	5 November 2026	(Indonesia) Agus Sugeng	5 November 2026
PSN	(Indonesia) Kletus Gabhe	Demoted to assistant	13 November 2026	(Indonesia) Patrick Domal	13 November 2026

== First round ==
A total of 24 teams will be divided into three groups based on the geographical location of their homebase. Each group consists of 8 teams, with each team playing against the other teams in their group two times in a double round-robin format.

Group winners, runners-up and the best two third-placed teams will advance to the second round.

=== Group A ===
Pos	Team	Pld	W	D	L	GF	GA	GD	Pts	Qualification
1	Pekanbaru	3	3	0	0	9	1	+8	9	Qualification to the second round
2	Batavia	2	2	0	0	14	2	+12	6	Qualification to the second round
3	Pesik	3	1	1	1	6	4	+2	4	
4	Persekat	2	1	1	0	3	2	+1	4	
5	Persikota	3	1	0	2	3	4	−1	3	
6	Persikotas Nusantara	2	0	0	2	2	5	−3	0	
7	Persitara	3	0	0	3	0	19	−19	0	
8	Sriwijaya (W)	0	0	0	0	0	0	0	0	Withdrew from the competition

Updated to match(es) played on 21 November 2026. Source: Liga Nusantara 2026–27
Rules for classification: 1) Points; 2) Head-to-head points; 3) Head-to-head goal difference; 4) Head-to-head goals scored; 5) Goal difference; 6) Goals scored; 7) Fair-play points; 8) Draw.
(W) Withdrew

=== Group B ===
Pos	Team	Pld	W	D	L	GF	GA	GD	Pts	Qualification
1	Putra Sang Fajar	3	3	0	0	5	1	+4	9	Qualification to the second round
2	Persika Karanganyar	3	2	1	0	3	1	+2	7	Qualification to the second round
3	Persibangga	3	1	1	1	3	4	−1	4	Qualification to the second round
4	Gresik United	3	0	3	0	2	2	0	3	
5	Persipa	3	0	2	1	2	3	−1	2	
6	Persibo	3	0	2	1	2	3	−1	2	
7	Persiba	3	0	2	1	2	3	−1	2	
8	Persinga	3	0	1	2	2	4	−2	1	

Updated to match(es) played on 22 November 2026. Source: Liga Nusantara 2026–27
Rules for classification: 1) Points; 2) Head-to-head points; 3) Head-to-head goal difference; 4) Head-to-head goals scored; 5) Goal difference; 6) Goals scored; 7) Fair-play points; 8) Draw.

=== Group C ===
Pos	Team	Pld	W	D	L	GF	GA	GD	Pts	Qualification
1	Persekabpas	3	3	0	0	6	1	+5	9	Qualification to the second round
2	Perseden	3	2	1	0	5	2	+3	7	Qualification to the second round
3	Persikutim United	3	1	1	1	3	3	0	4	Qualification to the second round
4	Pasuruan United	3	1	0	2	5	4	+1	3	
5	PSN	3	0	3	0	6	6	0	3	
6	Persipani	3	0	2	1	4	5	−1	2	
7	Persinab	3	0	2	1	2	5	−3	2	
8	Donggala United	3	0	1	2	5	10	−5	1	

Updated to match(es) played on 22 November 2026. Source: Liga Nusantara 2026–27
Rules for classification: 1) Points; 2) Head-to-head points; 3) Head-to-head goal difference; 4) Head-to-head goals scored; 5) Goal difference; 6) Goals scored; 7) Fair-play points; 8) Draw.

== Results ==
Teams play each other twice in a double round-robin format, once at home and once away, with each team playing 14 matches.

=== Group A ===
Home \ Away	BTV	PBR	TGR	TAS	TGL	PST	KNG	SFC
Batavia				3–2				
Pekanbaru			2–1					
Persikota							2–1	
Persikotas Nusantara		0–2						
Persekat			1–0					
Persitara	0–11	0–5						
Pesik					2–2	3–0		
Sriwijaya								

Updated to match(es) played on 21 November 2026. Source: Liga Nusantara 2026–27
Legend: Blue = home team win; Yellow = draw; Red = away team win.
For upcoming matches, an "a" indicates there is an article about the rivalry between the two participants.

=== Group B ===
Home \ Away	GRS	BTL	PBG	BJN	KAR	NGW	PAT	PSF
Gresik United					1–1			
Persiba	0–0				0–1			
Persibangga				2–1				
Persibo	1–1						0–0	
Persika Karanganyar						1–0		
Persinga			1–1					1–2
Persipa		2–2						0–1
Putra Sang Fajar			2–0					

Updated to match(es) played on 22 November 2026. Source: Liga Nusantara 2026–27
Legend: Blue = home team win; Yellow = draw; Red = away team win.
For upcoming matches, an "a" indicates there is an article about the rivalry between the two participants.

=== Group C ===
Home \ Away	DGL	PSU	PAS	PSD	NBX	PSI	PTM	PSN
Donggala United		1–4		1–3				
Pasuruan United			0–1					
Persekabpas					3–0	2–1		
Perseden							1–0	
Persinab				1–1				
Persipani								2–2
Persikutim United		2–1				1–1		
PSN	3–3				1–1			

Updated to match(es) played on 22 November 2026. Source: Liga Nusantara 2026–27
Legend: Blue = home team win; Yellow = draw; Red = away team win.
For upcoming matches, an "a" indicates there is an article about the rivalry between the two participants.

== Second round ==
The top eight teams from the first round will be divided into two groups of four teams.

The group winners will advance to the final and will be automatically promoted to the 2027–28 Championship, while the group runners-up will compete in the promotion play-off to determine the final promotion place.

=== Group A ===
Pos	Team	Pld	W	D	L	GF	GA	GD	Pts	Promotion or qualification
1	Team A	0	0	0	0	0	0	0	0	Qualification to the Final and promotion to the 2027–28 Championship
2	Team B	0	0	0	0	0	0	0	0	Qualification to the promotion play-off
3	Team C	0	0	0	0	0	0	0	0	
4	Team D	0	0	0	0	0	0	0	0	

First match(es) will be played: 19 January 2027. Source: Liga Nusantara 2026–27
Rules for classification: 1) Points; 2) Head-to-head points; 3) Head-to-head goal difference; 4) Head-to-head goals scored; 5) Goal difference; 6) Goals scored; 7) Fair-play points; 8) Draw.

=== Group B ===
Pos	Team	Pld	W	D	L	GF	GA	GD	Pts	Promotion or qualification
1	Team A	0	0	0	0	0	0	0	0	Qualification to the Final and promotion to the 2027–28 Championship
2	Team B	0	0	0	0	0	0	0	0	Qualification to the promotion play-off
3	Team C	0	0	0	0	0	0	0	0	
4	Team D	0	0	0	0	0	0	0	0	

First match(es) will be played: 19 January 2027. Source: Liga Nusantara 2026–27
Rules for classification: 1) Points; 2) Head-to-head points; 3) Head-to-head goal difference; 4) Head-to-head goals scored; 5) Goal difference; 6) Goals scored; 7) Fair-play points; 8) Draw.

== Promotion play-off ==
The play-off will be played as a single match. If tied after regulation time, extra time and, if necessary, a penalty shoot-out will be used to decide the winning team. The winner will be promoted to the 2027–28 Championship.

6 February 2027
--:--

v

== Final ==
The final will be played as a single match. If tied after regulation time, extra time and, if necessary, a penalty shoot-out will be used to decide the winning team.

2027
--:--

v

== Season statistics ==
=== Top scorers ===
As of 18 November 2026

Rank	Player	Club	Goals
1	(Indonesia) Ardian Syahputra	Batavia	2
1	(Indonesia) Farid Fauzi	Pasuruan United	2
1	(Indonesia) Rosihan Rizqi	Pasuruan United	2
1	(Indonesia) Enriyan Fahri	Pekanbaru	2
1	(Indonesia) Beto Gonçalves	Persekabpas Pasuruan	2
1	(Indonesia) Danhyl Tuka	Persipa Pati	2
1	(Indonesia) Diego Banowo	Pesik Kuningan	2
1	(Indonesia) Supriatna	Pesik Kuningan	2
1	(Indonesia) Johan Yoga Utama	Putra Sang Fajar	2
10	Twenty two players		1

== See also ==
- 2026–27 Super League
- 2026–27 Championship
- 2026–27 Liga 4
