= Yudi Khoerudin =

Indonesian association footballer

Personal information
- Full name: Yudi Khoerudin
- Date of birth: 5 September 1987 (age 39)
- Place of birth: Karawang, Indonesia
- Height: 1.81 m (5 ft 11 in)
- Position: Centre-back

Team information
- Current team: Persika 1951
- Number: 87

Youth career
- 2006–2007: Persib Bandung

Senior career*
| Years | Team | Apps | (Gls) |
| 2008–2009 | Persikota Tangerang | 26 | (1) |
| 2009–2010 | Pro Duta | 6 | (0) |
| 2010–2011 | Persib Bandung | 2 | (0) |
| 2011–2012 | Persiraja Banda Aceh | 14 | (0) |
| 2012–2015 | Persiba Balikpapan | 43 | (3) |
| 2016 | Persis Solo | 11 | (0) |
| 2017–2018 | Persiba Balikpapan | 21 | (2) |
| 2018 | PSS Sleman | 1 | (0) |
| 2019 | Perserang Serang | 3 | (0) |
| 2019–2023 | Sulut United | 25 | (6) |
| 2023–2024 | Bekasi City | 14 | (0) |
| 2024–2025 | Persikota Tangerang | 15 | (0) |
| 2025– | Persika 1951 | 11 | (0) |

International career
| 2009 | Indonesia U23 | | |
- * Club domestic league appearances and goals as of 31 May 2026

Yudi Khoedirun (born 5 September 1987) is an Indonesian professional footballer who plays as a centre-back for Liga 4 club Persika 1951.

== Club career ==
=== Sulut United ===
He was signed for Sulut United to play in Liga 2 in the 2019 season.

== International career ==
In 2009, Yudi represented the Indonesia U-23, in the 2009 Southeast Asian Games.

== Honours ==
=== Club ===
Persika 1951

- Liga 4 West Java Series 1, runner up: 2025–26
