= Bramdani =

Indonesian association footballer

Personal information
- Date of birth: 13 June 2003 (age 23)
- Place of birth: Jember, Indonesia
- Height: 1.65 m (5 ft 5 in)
- Position: Winger

Youth career
- SSB Glory Putra
- 2019: Persebaya U16
- 2019: Garuda Select
- 2020: Persebaya U20

Senior career*
Years	Team	Apps	(Gls)
2021	Badak Lampung	4	(1)
2022–2024	Persebaya Surabaya	0	(0)
2023	→ Persikab Bandung (loan)	4	(0)
2023–2024	→ Kalteng Putra (loan)	3	(0)
2024–2025	Persindra Indramayu	5	(0)
2025	PSPS Pekanbaru	4	(0)
- * Club domestic league appearances and goals as of 22:35, 10 January 2026 (UTC)

Bramdani (born 13 June 2003) is an Indonesian professional footballer who plays as a winger.

== Early career ==
Born in Jember Regency, East Java, he started his career in football when he joined SSB Glory Putra. Initially, his father had rejected his desire to play football. Because he was worried that his short posture was prone to injury.

But when he was still in the third grade of elementary school, he was desperate to register for a tournament in his village. Seeing his son playing barefoot with great enthusiasm. In a match, his slick performance was observed by the Persebaya U16 talent scouting team.

== Club career ==
=== Badak Lampung ===
In June 2021, Bramdani signed a contract with Liga 2 club Badak Lampung. Bramdani made his professional debut in 3–1 away lose against Persekat Tegal on 27 September 2021. On 25 October 2021, Bramdani scored his first league goal for Badak Lampung in a 4–1 home win against Perserang Serang. He contributed this season with the club by scoring 1 goal in 4 league appearances.

=== Persebaya Surabaya ===
On 13 May 2022, Bramdani signed a contract with Liga 1 club Persebaya Surabaya. However, he was raised by Persebaya's academy team before joining Garuda Select in October 2019. After being released from Garuda Select, he joined Badak Lampung since 20 June 2021 which plays in Liga 2.

==== Loan to Persikab Bandung ====
He was signed for Persikab Bandung to play in Liga 2 in 2023–24 season, on loan from Persebaya Surabaya.
