= Depok City F.C. =

Association football team in Indonesia

Depok City
- Full name: Depok City Football Club
- Nicknames: Pendekar Margonda (Margonda Knight)
- Short name: DC
- Founded: 18 November 2020; 5 years ago
- Ground: Merpati Stadium
- Capacity: 10,000
- Owner: PT. Adhidaya Gunung Merapi (AGM)
- CEO: Supari Syahri
- Manager: Angga Dipa Bahari
- Coach: Muhamad Husen
- League: Liga 4
- 2023: 4th, (West Java zone)
Home colours	Away colours

Depok City Football Club (simply known as Depok City or DC) is an Indonesian football club based in Depok, West Java. They currently compete in the Liga 4.

== History ==
Depok City FC is officially present in national football by becoming a member of the local Association City of PSSI on 18 November 2020. The acquisition agreement was made by the owners of Persebam Babakan Madang, Delif Subekti and Supari as CEO of PT. Adhidaya Gunung Merapi (AGM). The administrators also witnessed this activity live.

== Stadium ==
Depok City FC homebase is Merpati Stadium, groundsharing with another Depok football club like Persikad 1999, Dejan FC, and Depok United FC.
