= F.X. Yanuar Wahyu =

Indonesian footballer

Personal information
- Full name: Fransiskus Xaverius Yanuar Wahyu
- Date of birth: 15 January 1983 (age 43)
- Place of birth: Malang, Indonesia
- Height: 1.84 m (6 ft 1/2 in)
- Position: Defender

Team information
- Current team: Perseden Denpasar (Head coach)

Senior career*
Years	Team	Apps	(Gls)
2006–2007	Persema Malang		
2008–2014	Persela Lamongan	?	(?)
2014–2015	PS Barito Putera	?	(0)
2016	Persegres Gresik United	9	(0)

Managerial career
- 2018: Borneo U-20
- 2021–2022: Arema (video analyst)
- 2022–2024: Arema (assistant)
- 2024: Madura United (video analyst)
- 2024–2026: Semen Padang (video analyst)
- 2025: Semen Padang (caretaker)
- 2026–: Perseden Denpasar
- * Club domestic league appearances and goals

Fransiskus Xaverius Yanuar Wahyu is an Indonesian professional football coach and former player who is the head coach of Liga Nusantara club Perseden Denpasar.

== Altercation ==
On 11 May 2010, when Persela faced Arema Malang in the league at the Kanjuruhan Stadium, he was involved in an on-pitch incident with Arema Malang's Noh Alam Shah. On the 70th minute, he fouled Alam Shah. Then, Alam Shah grabbed Yanuar from behind and Yanuar spun around and knocked Alam Shah down. Both players were sent off. Arema won the match 2–1.

== Managerial statistics ==
As of 20 October 2025

Managerial record by team and tenure
Team	Nat.	From	To	Record								Ref.
Team	Nat.	From	To	G	W	D	L	GF	GA	GD	Win %	Ref.
Semen Padang (caretaker)	(Indonesia)	9 October 2025	20 October 2025	1	0	0	1	0	1	−1	0.00	
Career Total				1	0	0	1	0	1	−1	0.00	
