= Taufiq Kasrun =

Indonesian footballer

Personal information
- Full name: Taufiq Kasrun
- Date of birth: 12 October 1985 (age 41)
- Place of birth: Lamongan, Indonesia
- Height: 1.76 m (5 ft 9 in)
- Position: Centre-back

Team information
- Current team: Persika Karanganyar (Head coach)

Senior career*
Years	Team	Apps	(Gls)
2005–2008	Persela Lamongan	12	(0)
2008–2009	Persitara North Jakarta	30	(0)
2009–2012	Persela Lamongan	74	(3)
2012–2013	Sriwijaya	8	(0)
2013–2017	Persela Lamongan	73	(4)
2018	Kalteng Putra	22	(8)
2018	Persiraja Banda Aceh	1	(0)
2019	Persiba Balikpapan	10	(1)
2020–2021	Hizbul Wathan	8	(1)
2022	PSKC Cimahi	5	(0)
2023	Persikab Bandung	0	(0)
Total		243	(17)

International career
2003–2004	Indonesia U19		
2005–2007	Indonesia U23	8	(0)

Managerial career
- 2023–2025: Cimahi Putra
- 2025: Jakarta United
- 2025–2026: Bhayangkara U20
- 2026: Persela Lamongan Youth
- 2026–: Persika Karanganyar
- * Club domestic league appearances and goals

Taufiq Kasrun (born 12 October 1985) is an Indonesian professional football coach and former player who is currently head coach of Persika Karanganyar.

== Club career ==
=== Hizbul Wathan FC ===
In 2021, Kasrun signed a contract with Indonesian Liga 2 club Hizbul Wathan. He made his league debut on 27 September against Persijap Jepara. On 25 October 2021, Kasrun scored his first goal for Hizbul Wathan against PSG Pati in the 11th minute at the Manahan Stadium, Surakarta.

== Honours ==
=== Club ===
Sriwijaya

- Indonesian Inter Island Cup: 2012
