= RedDoorz =

Singapore-based hotel company and hospitality brand

Commeasure Pte. Ltd. / RedDoorz Group
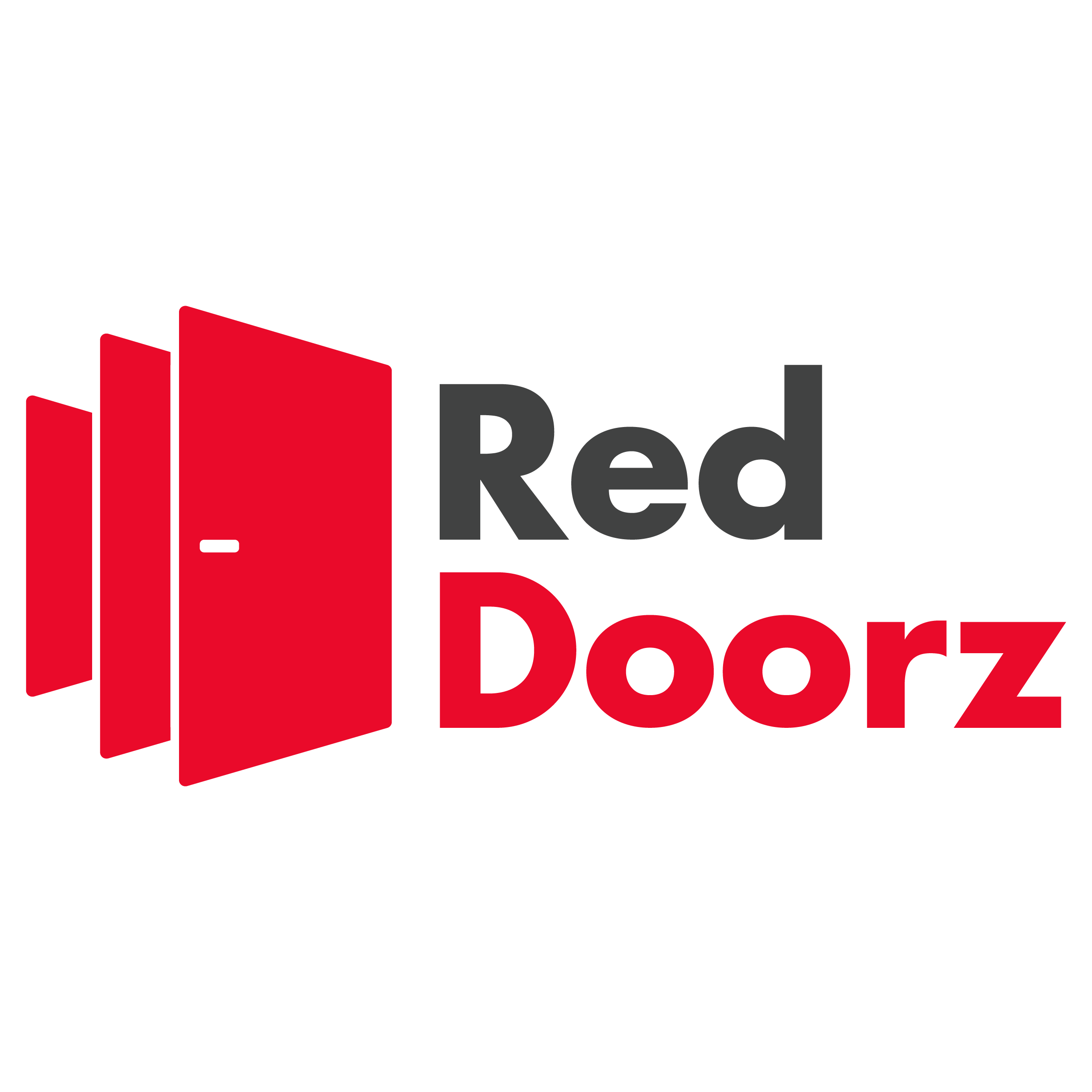
- Type: Private
- Industry: Hospitality
- Founded: 2015; 11 years ago in Jakarta, Indonesia
- Founders: Amit Saberwal (CEO); Asheesh Saxena
- Headquarters: Indonesia, Jakarta, Indonesia
- Number of locations: 3,900 (2023)
- Area served: Southeast Asia (Singapore, Indonesia, , and Philippines)
- Brands: RedDoorz; RedLiving; RedPartner; KoolKost; Urbanview; Sans Hotel; Sunnera; The Lavana
- Services: Hospitality management; Hotel booking platform
- Number of employees: 581 (2023)
- Parent: Group RedDoorz
- Website: group.reddoorz.com/en

RedDoorz is a Singapore-based hotel company and hospitality brand that operates in Southeast Asia. The company aggregates existing budget hotels, offers staff training, provides access to digital services, and rebrands the hotels as RedDoorz. It was founded in 2015 and in early-2025 it maintains 4,500 properties over thousands of cities across Indonesia, and the Philippines.

== History ==
RedDoorz was founded in July 2015 by Amit Saberwal and Asheesh Saxena in Jakarta, Indonesia. Saberwal (who is CEO) and Saxena are former MakeMyTrip executives. RedDoorz was launched as a part of Commeasure, a company founded by Saberwal that produced a platform designed to assist budget hotels with expanding their online presence.

RedDoorz opened its first hotel in Singapore in January 2017, followed by the Philippines in January 2018 and Vietnam in July 2018. As of October 2019, the company manages around 1,500 properties in 100 cities in Southeast Asia.

== Funding and investment ==
In September 2015, the company received an undisclosed amount of funding with backing from Jungle Ventures. It raised further venture funding from 500 Startups in January 2016, accumulating US$1.4 million in what it described as a pre-series A funding round. At that time, the company had a network of 200 properties throughout Indonesia.

In 2017, RedDoorz moved its headquarters to Singapore. In April of that year, it raised $1 million in venture debt from InnoVen Capital. In May 2017, it had over 500 properties in Indonesia and six in Singapore in its portfolio. In March 2018, RedDoorz raised $11 million in funding in a "pre-series B" round led by Susquehanna International Group, the International Finance Corporation, InnoVen Capital, and Jungle Ventures (among others). The funding was designed to facilitate further regional expansion. That month, the company also opened its initial fully-leased and managed hotel location in Singapore. In June 2018, the company announced that it would expand into the Philippines. It also introduced a new property category with RedDoorz Premium, a higher-end version of its existing RedDoorz and RedDoorz Plus categories. By the end of the year, it had 70 properties in the Philippines. It also expanded into Vietnam.

In July 2019, RedDoorz closed a $45 million (USD) series-B funding round led by Qiming Venture Partners with additional investment from Jungle Ventures and the MNC Group. This was quickly followed by a series-C funding round in August 2019 worth $70 million with investment from Rakuten Capital and the Mirae Asset-Naver Asia Growth Fund. The series-C round brought the company's total funding to around $140 million.

RedDoorz has raised a total funding of $140M over 7 rounds. Their latest funding round was a Series C round on Aug 18, 2019 for $70M.

== Operation ==
RedDoorz operates a network of budget hotels under its eponymous brand name in four countries in Southeast Asia: Indonesia, Singapore, the Philippines, and Vietnam. The company primarily aggregates currently existing budget hotels. RedDoorz provides the owners and staff of those hotels with training and lessons in customer service, language, cleaning techniques, and how to use RedDoorz technology.

Each RedDoorz hotel also offers similar amenities including free wireless internet access, the ability to book rooms online, and satellite-connected TVs. In addition to its aggregated budget hotels, RedDoorz owns and operates its own collection of properties. It maintains three separate property categories (RedDoorz, RedDoorz Plus, and RedDoorz Premium) with a rising scale of amenities and price points.

RedDoorz also has several sub-brand such as RedLiving, KoolKost, UrbanView, Sans Hotel, Sunnera, The Lavana.

== RedDoorz Founders and Directors ==
Founders	Amit Saberwal (Co-Founder) Kunwar Asheesh Saxena (Co-Founder).
Directors	Amit Saberwal Anurag Srivastava Bhanu Chopra Hsu Richard
