= Boy Jati Asmara =

Indonesian footballer

Boy Jati
Personal information
- Full name: Boy Jati Asmara
- Date of birth: 4 December 1984 (age 41)
- Place of birth: Bandung, Indonesia
- Height: 1.70 m (5 ft 7 in)
- Position: Striker

Youth career
- PS UNI
- Persib Junior

Senior career*
Years	Team	Apps	(Gls)
2004–2005	Persijatim	10	(2)
2005–2006	Persipura Jayapura	8	(0)
2006–2007	Persib Bandung	12	(4)
2007	PSMS Medan	14	(7)
2008	Mitra Kukar	6	(2)
2008–2009	Persikabo Bogor	23	(9)
2009–2010	Deltras Sidoarjo	21	(8)
2010–2011	Persitara North Jakarta	14	(6)
2011–2012	Arema Indonesia	8	(2)
2014	Persijap Jepara	13	(0)
2016	Persepam Madura United	9	(0)
Total		138	(40)

International career
2002	Indonesia U 19	?	(1)
- * Club domestic league appearances and goals

Boy Jati Asmara (born 4 December 1984 in Bandung) is an Indonesian former footballer.

== Honours ==
PSMS Medan

- Liga Indonesia Premier Division runner up: 2007–08
