= Persima Majalengka =

Association football team in Indonesia

Persima
- Full name: Persatuan Sepakbola Indonesia Majalengka
- Nickname: Laskar Talaga Manggung
- Short name: MJK
- Founded: 1960; 66 years ago
- Ground: Warung Jambu Stadium; Majalengka, West Java
- Capacity: 1,500
- Owner: PSSI Majalengka Regency
- Chairman: Aljun
- Manager: Jhoni Gumilar
- Coach: Yoga Anggita
- League: Liga 4
- 2024–25: 4th, Second Round in Group F (West Java zone)
Home colours	Away colours	Third colours

Persatuan Sepakbola Indonesia Majalengka (simply known as Persima) is an Indonesian football club based in Majalengka, West Java. They currently compete in the Liga 4 West Java zone.

== History ==
=== The beginning (1915–1945) ===
The history of Persima Majalengka's forerunner began in 1915, when a football club, was founded under the name Madjalengka Voetbal Comite (MVC) during the Dutch colonial period. The founding of MVC makes this club older than Persib Bandung (founded as Bandoeng Inlandsche Voetbal Bond in 1919) and Persija Jakarta (founded as Voetbalbond Indonesische Jacatra in 1928). MVC was originally a sports association, including football, which involved the local community, including trade elements such as guava middlemen, which became part of social and sporting activities in Majalengka.

In the next era, the club's name changed to Perkoempoelan Orang Madjalengka (POM), but the year is unknown, which not only focused on football but also social activities. During the Japanese occupation and the Indonesian struggle for independence, football activities in Majalengka continued, albeit in a more informal form, such as the post-independence community sports week (POMAS).

=== Independence era and official formation (1945–1970s) ===
After Indonesian independence, football in Majalengka continued to develop. In 1960, the club was officially formed as Persatuan Sepakbola Indonesia Majalengka (Persima) under the auspices of the PSSI of Majalengka Regency (Asosiasi Kabupaten PSSI Majalengka). Initially headquartered in the Ciasih complex in Majalengka Wetan, Persima was managed by Suwondho, the initial administrator.

In the early 1970s, the government built Warung Jambu Stadium as Persima's official home, a milestone in the club's development. The stadium's name derives from its historic location, once known as a guava middlemen's association. The stadium underwent renovations, including the use of synthetic turf, in 2024 to support regional competitions.

=== Modern era (1980s–present) ===
Since the 2000s, Persima has regularly participated in Indonesia's lowest-level league competitions, such as Liga 3 West Java and Liga 4 West Java. The club has often faced performance challenges, such as failing to advance beyond the group stage in 2017 Liga 3. However, Persima continues to actively develop youth players, including the selection for the 2025 U17 Soeratin Cup, which involved hundreds of youths from various districts in Majalengka.

In 2024–25 season, Persima competed in Liga 4 West Java Series 1, drawn in Group C alongside Pesik Kuningan, Persindra Indramayu, Persigar Garut, Mandala Majalengka, and Al Jabbar. Despite finishing second in their group, the club recorded important wins, including a 2–1 victory over Al Jabbar. The club's management underwent changes, including a change of management in 2025, with Hendro stepping down as director. Persima is also active in trial matches and friendlies, such as a 3–1 victory over Mandala Majalengka in 2025. The club collaborates with apparel companies like Major7 for competition jerseys. Although it hasn't achieved significant national success, Persima remains a benchmark for football in Majalengka and a symbol of local pride.
