= Pesik Kuningan =

Indonesian football club

Pesik
- Full name: Persatuan Sepakbola Indonesia Kuningan
- Nicknames: Kuda Ciremai (Ciremai Horse); Laskar Saunggalah (Saunggalah Warriors)
- Founded: 1950; 76 years ago
- Ground: Mashud Wisnusaputra Stadium
- Capacity: 10,000
- Owner: Kuningan Regency Government
- Chairman: H. Didi Sutardi
- Manager: Abdul Haris
- Coach: Mochammad Fachrudin
- League: Liga Nusantara
- 2025–26: 3rd place (West Java zone); Semi-finalist in national phase (promoted)
Home colours	Away colours

Persatuan Sepakbola Indonesia Kuningan (simply known as Pesik) is an Indonesian football club based in Kuningan Regency, West Java. They set to compete in the Liga Nusantara from 2026–27 season after promotion from Liga 4 in 2025–26 season.

== History ==
Pesik Kuningan was established in 1950, or the early post-independence period as a platform for developing soccer and representing Kuningan Regency at the regional level in West Java.

For decades during the Perserikatan era and into the early days of the unified league (Liga Indonesia 1994), Pesik primarily competed at the provincial level and in the lowest divisions (Division II and Division III) as a Perserikatan team that relied on local talent. Under manager H. Yayan Sofyan and head coach Ade “Piit” Lesmana, Pesik managed to climb from the lowest division to the Liga Indonesia Third Division, eventually earning promotion to Liga Indonesia Second Division in 2005. In one of its best seasons during that period, Pesik came close to being promoted to the Liga Indonesia Premier Division before its run came to an end in the final stages.

After seven seasons in second division, Pesik was relegated back to third division in 2013. Following the restructuring of the leagues into Liga 1, Liga 2, and Liga 3 in 2017, Pesik had to compete in the Liga 3 West Java zone.

The 2025–26 season was both a historic and the best season for Pesik. Starting their journey in the 2025–26 Liga 4 West Java Series 1, they secured third place after defeating Cimahi United 4–1, thereby advancing to the national phase. In the national phase, they advanced to the Liga 4 semifinals and earned promotion to Liga Nusantara for the following season after finishing runner-up in Group A in the fourth round. In the semifinals, they defeated PSN Ngada in a penalty shootout (4–5) after a 1–1 draw that went into extra time; however, they lost 1–0 to Pasuruan United in the final match.

== Rivalries ==
Pesik has a major rivalry with PSGJ Cirebon, a football club from Cirebon Regency. This rivalry stems from regional prestige and geographical proximity. Matches between the two clubs are often heated, with supporters even attacking each other. Apart from that, Pesik also has a rivalry with neighboring Persima Majalengka. Their match was called the Ciremai derby, taken from the name of Mount Ciremai, which is on the border between Kuningan and Majalengka.

== Nicknames ==
Pesik Kuningan has two primary nicknames: Kuda Ciremai (Ciremai Horse) and Laskar Saunggalah (Saunggalah Warriors). The nickname Kuda Ciremai combines the characteristics of the local mascot, the Windu Horse—representing agility, resilience, and strength—with the grandeur of Mount Ciremai, a symbol of majesty and steadfast defense. Meanwhile, the nickname Laskar Saunggalah is rooted in local history, referencing the Kingdom of Saunggalah—a small vassal state of the Sunda Kingdom—which served as the precursor to the Kuningan Regency. Philosophically, these nicknames embody a club identity defined by competitiveness and an unyielding spirit, competing with honor while upholding the cultural heritage of their ancestral land.

== Season-by-season records ==
Season	League/Division	Tier	Tms.	Pos.	Piala Indonesia
2004	Second Division	3	40	first round, 3rd in Group F	—
2005	Second Division	3	23	first round	—
2006	Second Division	3	47	first round	—
2007	Second Division	3	57	first round	qualifying round
2008–09	First Division	3	48	first round, 5th in Group III	—
2009–10	First Division	3	60	first round, 3rd in Group IV	—
2010	First Division	3	57	second round, 4th in Group C	—
2011–12	First Division (LPIS)	3	66	first round, 4th in Group V	—
2013	First Division	3	77	first round, 4th in Group 5	—
2014	First Division	3	73	first round, 3rd in Group F	—
2015					
2016
2017
2018	Liga 3	3	32	eliminated in provincial phase	—
2019	Liga 3	3	32	eliminated in provincial phase	—
2020	Liga 3	3	season abandoned		—
2021–22	Liga 3	3	64	eliminated in provincial phase	—
2022–23	Liga 3	3	season abandoned		—
2023–24	Liga 3	3	80	eliminated in provincial phase	—
2024–25	Liga 4	4	64	first round, 4th in Group J	—
2025–26	Liga 4	4	64	runner-up	—
2026–27	Liga Nusantara	3	24	TBD	—

Champion	Runner-up	Promotion	Relegation

== Honours ==
- Liga 4
  - Runner-up (1): 2025–26
