= Persikabbar West Bandung =

Indonesian football club

Persikabbar Bandung Barat
- Full name: Perserikatan Sepakbola Indonesia Kabupaten Bandung Barat
- Nickname: Laskar Maung Bodas
- Founded: 2019; 7 years ago
- Ground: Bentang Stadium; Lembang, West Bandung Regency
- Capacity: 2,000
- Owner: PSSI West Bandung
- Chairman: Ahmad Hasanudin
- Manager: Erlan Agustian
- Coach: Imral Usman
- League: Liga 4
- 2024–25: 6th in Group A, Relegated (West Java zone)
Home colours	Away colours

Perserikatan Sepakbola Indonesia Kabupaten Bandung Barat (simply known as Persikabbar) is an Indonesian football club based in West Bandung Regency, West Java. They currently compete in the Liga 4.

== Rivalries ==
Persikabbar has a rivalry with Bandung Barat United which comes from the same area. This match is known as the West Bandung derby.

== Honours ==
- Liga 3 West Java Series 2
  - Third-place (1): 2021
