= Karawang United F.C. =

Association football team in Indonesia

Karawang United
- Full name: Karawang United Football Club
- Nicknames: Singa Karawang (Karawang Lion)
- Short name: KUFC
- Founded: 2020; 6 years ago
- Ground: Singaperbangsa Stadium
- Capacity: 20,000
- Owner: PT. Karawang Maju Bersama
- CEO: H. Ali Akbar
- Coach: H. Muksin Akbar
- League: Liga 4
- 2024–25: 3rd, in Group B (West Java zone)
Home colours	Away colours

Karawang United Football Club (simply known as KUFC or Karawang United) is an Indonesian football club based in Karawang Regency, West Java. They currently compete in the Liga 4.
