= Persipu F.C. =

Indonesian football club

Persipu
- Full name: Persatuan Sepakbola Inspirasi Pemuda Football Club
- Nickname: The Loji Tigers
- Founded: 2008; 18 years ago
- Stadium: Merpati Stadium
- Capacity: 10,000
- Owner: Andrew Baskoro
- Chairman: Suryo Agung Wibowo
- Manager: Andri Irawan
- Coach: Hasnan Sungkar
- League: Liga 4
- 2024–25: 2nd (West Java zone); First round, 3rd in Group O (National phase)
- Website: www.thelojitigers.com
Home colours	Away colours

Persatuan Sepakbola Inspirasi Pemuda Football Club, simply known as Persipu, is an Indonesian football club based in Depok, West Java. They currently compete in the Liga 4. They founded in 2008 by Andrew Baskoro who has acquired a football club from Bandung named Tiki Taka, which is owned by his friend.

== History ==
Persipu is a football club that was founded in 2008, which was originally intended as a gathering place for fellow professional football players, during the holidays they compete in the Indonesian league with their respective clubs.

On the basis of the purpose of gathering and staying in touch, initially Persipu's activities were limited to holding friendly matches during the holidays. Over time, Persipu has regenerated with the addition of members, the majority of whom are young footballers.

As a result, the forum which was previously shown as a casual gathering place for senior footballers, slowly turned into a coaching program for young footballers who are looking for a stepping stone for them to penetrate the professional level. Tiki Taka, and changed its name to Persipu. Thus, Persipu officially became an Indonesian league team as of mid 2017.

== Honours ==
- Liga 4 West Java Series 1
  - Runner-up (1): 2024–25
