= Purnawarman Stadium =

- Location in Java
- Address: Indonesia
- Location: Purwakarta, Purwakarta Regency, West Java
- Coordinates: 6°33′52″S 107°26′44″E
- Owner: Government of Purwakarta Regency
- Operator: Government of Purwakarta Regency
- Capacity: 10,000
- Surface: Grass field

Tenant
- Persipo Purwakarta

Purnawarman Stadium is a multi-use stadium in Purwakarta, Purwakarta Regency, West Java, Indonesia. It is currently used mostly for football matches and is used as the home venue for Persipo Purwakarta. The stadium holds 10,000 people.
