= Bandung United F.C. =

Indonesian football club

Bandung United
- Full name: Bandung United Football Club
- Nickname: Maung Bandung Muda
- Short name: Band-U
- Founded: 2019; 7 years ago
- Ground: Siliwangi Stadium
- Capacity: 15,000
- Owner: PT. Persib Bandung Bermartabat
- Manager: Zaenal Arief
- Coach: Boy Jati Asmara
- League: Liga 4
- 2024–25: 3rd, in Group A (West Java zone)
Home colours	Away colours

Bandung United Football Club is an Indonesian football club based in Bandung, West Java that competes in Liga 4, the fourth tier of Indonesian football. The club was founded in 2019 after the takeover of Blitar United by PT. Persib Bandung Bermartabat and its subsequent relocation to Bandung. It is the feeder club of Persib Bandung and holds its home matches at Siliwangi Stadium.

== History ==
Bandung United was formed in 2019 after PT. Persib Bandung Bermartabat (PBB) bought Blitar United's license and relocated their homebase to Bandung, making it the feeder club of Persib Bandung. In its first season, the club finished 12th in the West Region of Liga 2, sending it down to Liga 3 where it will compete with fellow Persib satellite team, Maung Anom.

== Players ==
=== Current squad ===
As of 12 May 2021

Note: Flags indicate national team as defined under FIFA eligibility rules; some limited exceptions apply. Players may hold more than one non-FIFA nationality.

No.	Pos.	Nation	Player
6	DF	IDN	Ariya Nugraha
9	FW	IDN	Yasril Rahmadwan
10	MF	IDN	Bagus Yoga Setiawan
16	DF	IDN	Yuda Mega Hermawan
17	MF	IDN	Aditya Riznanda
19	MF	IDN	Muh. Iqbal
23	FW	IDN	Ahmad Faisal
24	DF	IDN	Ponda Dwi Saputra

No.	Pos.	Nation	Player
38	GK	IDN	Riski Harianto
55	DF	IDN	Achmad Budi Hargo
89	DF	IDN	Rizki Arrohman
97	DF	IDN	Murdaim
90	MF	IDN	Ilham Qolba
—	DF	IDN	Divie Alviandi
—	MF	IDN	Sodri Alfauzi
—	FW	IDN	Ravil Shandyka (on loan from Persib Bandung)

== Season-by-season records ==
As Blitar United

Season	League	Tier	Tms.	Pos.	Piala Indonesia
2014	Liga Nusantara	4	32	Eliminated in Regional round	–
2015	Liga Nusantara	3	season abandoned		–
2016	ISC Liga Nusantara	3	32	3	–
2017	Liga 3	3	32	1	–
2018	Liga 2	2	24	7th, East division	Round of 32

As Bandung United

Season	League	Tier	Tms.	Pos.	Piala Indonesia
2019	Liga 2	2	23	12th, West division	–
2020	Liga 3	3	season abandoned		–
2021–22	Liga 3	3	64	Second round	–
2022–23	Liga 3	3	season abandoned		–
2023–24	Liga 3	3	80	Eliminated in Provincial round	–
2024–25	Liga 4	4	64	Eliminated in Provincial round	–
