= PS Cimahi Putra =

Association football team in Indonesia

- Full name: Persatuan Sepakbola Cimahi Putra
- Nicknames: Elang Cimahi (Cimahi Eagles)
- Short name: PS Citra
- Founded: 27 July 1992; 33 years ago
- Ground: Sangkuriang Stadium; Cimahi, West Java
- Capacity: 5,000
- Owner: PSSI Cimahi City
- Chairman: Eddy Mulyo
- Coach: Taufiq Kasrun
- League: Liga 4
- 2024–25: 1st, (West Java zone); Withdrew (National phase)
Home colours	Away colours

PS Cimahi Putra (simply known as PS Citra) is an Indonesian football club based in Cimahi, West Java. They currently compete in the Liga 4.

This team was founded on 27 July 1992 and is the oldest team in Cimahi City. This team is nicknamed Super Elchi (Super Eagles of Cimahi) and also Laskar Pasundan.

== Honours ==
- Liga 4 West Java Series 1
  - Champion (1): 2024–25
