= Persikabumi Sukabumi =

Indonesian football club

Persikabumi
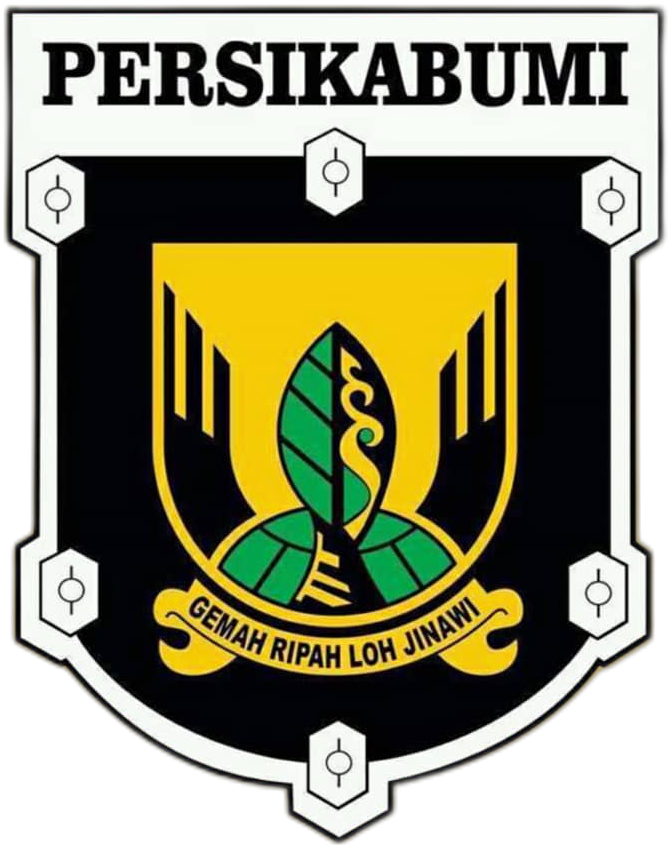
- Full name: Persatuan Sepakbola Indonesia Kabupaten Sukabumi
- Nickname: Laskar Penyu Selatan
- Founded: 23 November 1919; 106 years ago as Soekaboemische Sportvereeniging en Planters Voetbalclub
- Ground: Korpri Stadium; Cisaat, Sukabumi Regency, West Java
- Capacity: 15,000
- Owner(s): Askab PSSI Sukabumi 92% & Muhammad Yusuf Chatyawan 8%
- Chairman: Budi Azhar Mutawali
- Manager: Budi Azhar Mutawali
- Coach: Hendi Gunawan
- League: Liga 4
- 2024–25: Second Round, 3rd in Group E (West Java zone); Second round, 4th in Group X (National phase)
Home colours	Away colours

Persatuan Sepakbola Indonesia Kabupaten Sukabumi, simply known as Persikabumi Kabupaten Sukabumi or Persikabumi, is an Indonesian football club based in Sukabumi Regency, West Java. They currently compete in the Liga 4.

== Rivalries ==
The club's main rival is Perssi Sukabumi and the derby is often called Derbi Sukabumi (Sukabumi Derby).
