= Persika 1951 =

Indonesian football club based in Karawang

- Full name: Persatuan Sepakbola Indonesia Karawang 1951
- Nickname: Laskar Jawara
- Founded: 2022; 4 years ago
- Ground: Singaperbangsa Stadium; Karawang Regency, West Java
- Capacity: 25,000
- Owner: Karawang Regency Government
- Chairman: Asep Aang Rahmatullah
- Coach: Herdy Sofiq
- League: Liga 4
- 2025–26: 2nd (West Java Series 1 zone); First round, 3rd in Group I (National phase)
| Home colours | Away colours |

Persatuan Sepakbola Indonesia Karawang 1951 (simply known as Persika 1951) is an Indonesian football club based in Karawang Regency, West Java. This team competes in Liga 4 West Java Zone and their homebase is Singaperbangsa Stadium.

== History ==
Founded in 2022, Persika 1951 was formed as a protest club because of the disappointment of supporters in the chaotic management of Persika Karawang. So on the basis of the agreement of three supporter alliances in collaboration with Association PSSI Karawang Regency then a new management was formed to navigate the 2022 Liga 3 West Java season after the merger with Persekabtas Tasikmalaya. In its first season, Persika 1951 used the name Persekabtas Persika 1951 to compete the league.

== Season-by-season records ==
| Season | League/Division | Tms. | Pos. | Piala Indonesia |
|---|---|---|---|---|
| 2022–23 | Liga 3 | season abandoned | | — |
| 2023–24 | Liga 3 | 80 | 4th in Group 1, second round | — |
| 2024–25 | Liga 4 | 64 | eliminated in provincial phase | — |
| 2025–26 | Liga 4 | 64 | 3rd in Group I, first round | — |

== Honours ==
- Liga 4 West Java Series 1
  - Runner-up (1): 2025–26
