= Merpati Stadium =

Stadium in Depok, West Java

- Location in Depok
- Location: Depok, West Java, Indonesia
- Coordinates: 6°23′22″S 106°48′24″E
- Owner: Government of Depok City
- Operator: Government of Depok City
- Capacity: 10,000
- Surface: Grass field

Construction
- Opened: 2001
- Renovated: 2021
- Expanded: 2016–ongoing

Tenants
- Persikad Depok; Persipu

Merpati Stadium is a football stadium in the city of Depok, West Java, Indonesia. The stadium has a capacity of 10,000 people. It is the home base of Persikad Depok.
