= PSGJ Cirebon =

Indonesian football club

- Full name: Persatuan Sepakbola Gunung Jati Cirebon
- Nickname: Laskar Wali Bangkit
- Short name: PSGJ
- Founded: 1962; 64 years ago
- Ground: Bima Stadium
- Capacity: 15,000
- Owner: Askab PSSI Cirebon
- Chairman: Imam Saputra
- Manager: Imam Saputra
- Coach: Haryadi
- League: Liga 4
- 2023: 6th in Group D, Relegated
Home colours	Away colours	Third colours

Persatuan Sepakbola Gunung Jati Cirebon (simply known as PSGJ Cirebon) is a football club based in Cirebon Regency, West Java. Established in 1962, they currently play at Liga 4 and their homebase is Bima Stadium. Their main rival is PSIT Cirebon which comes from Cirebon City, the match between these two teams is called the Cirebon derby.

== Rivalries ==
PSGJ has a major rivalry with Pesik Kuningan, a football club from Kuningan Regency. This rivalry stems from regional prestige and geographical proximity, with supporters even attacking each other.

Another rivalry is between PSGJ and PSIT Cirebon from Cirebon City. This match is known as the Cirebon derby.

== Honours ==
- Liga 3 West Java Series 2
  - Runners-up (1): 2022
