= Singaperbangsa Stadium =

Stadium in Karawang Regency, Indonesia

Coordinates: 6°18′10″S 107°18′22″E

Stadion Singaperbangsa
- Interactive map of Stadion Singaperbangsa
- Location: Karawang, West Java
- Capacity: 25,000
- Surface: Manila grass

Construction
- Renovated: 2017

Tenants
- Persita Tangerang; Pelita Jaya; Persika Karawang

Singaperbangsa Stadium, or Stadion Singaperbangsa, is a multi-purpose stadium located in Karawang Regency, Indonesia. Mostly, this stadium is used for football matches. The stadium is currently the home base of Persita Tangerang which is playing in the Indonesia Super League and Persika Karawang in the Premier Division LPIS (the 2nd level football competition in Indonesia) and also Markuban Matador FC club playing in First Division. Previously it was also the home base of Pelita Jaya, a football club playing in the Indonesia Super League (ISL) from 2010 to 2012, before moving to Bandung after merger with Bandung Raya. It has a seating capacity of 25,000.

The stadium was named after Panembahan Singaperbangsa, the first regent of Karawang, appointed in 1633 by Sultan Agung of Mataram with the title of Dalem Kertabumi III.
