= Citeureup Raya F.C. =

Indonesian football club

Citeureup Raya
- Full name: Citeureup Raya Football Club
- Nickname: The Bulldozer
- Founded: 2011; 15 years ago
- Ground: Citeureup KONI Field; Citeureup, Bogor Regency
- Capacity: 1,000
- President: Dedi Cakra Baidillah
- Manager: Suprayogi
- Coach: Sudarmanto
- League: Liga 4
- 2024–25: 6th in Group D, Relegated (West Java zone)
Home colours	Away colours

Citeureup Raya Football Club is an Indonesian football club based in Citeureup, Bogor Regency, West Java that competes in Liga 4. Their home base is Citeureup KONI Field.

== History ==
Citeureup Raya was established by Dedi Cakra Baidillah in 2011, starting from a local soccer school, then growing rapidly and acquiring a club from Bekasi, Tajama Football Club, which at that time experienced a financial crisis in 2017. From there, he, who is a resident of Citeureup, has the means to realize his big dream, which is to promote football there by fostering and providing competitive opportunities for local boy.

They also appeared in the Liga 3 West Java zone. Their steps have always been stuck at the provincial level in the first three seasons (2017–2019) before then impressing and qualifying for the national round in the 2021 season.

In the national round of Liga 3, they are in Group F, they will play all matches at Galuh Stadium, Ciamis Regency on 7, 10, and 13 February 2022. They will face the champions of 2021 Liga 3 Special Region of Yogyakarta, Mataram Utama in their first match of the national round on Sunday. But they suffered defeat in their first match after losing 2–0 against Mataram Utama on 7 February, in the next match, Citeureup Raya will face the champions of 2021 Liga 3 West Sulawesi PS Sandeq. three days later, in that match, they had their second match in a 2–2 draw against PS Sandeq. three days later, they closed the match in the round of 64 Liga 3 in a 4–2 win against Persisam United, with this result, they qualified for the round of 32 as runners-up first round of Group F.
