= Al Jabbar F.C. =

Indonesian football club

Al Jabbar Cirebon
- Full name: Al Jabbar Football Club
- Nicknames: Laskar Karatak; The Schoolboys
- Short name: Al Jabbar
- Founded: 1994; 32 years ago
- Ground: Bima Stadium
- Capacity: 15,000
- Owner: Al Jabbar High School
- Manager: Retno Widodo
- League: Liga 4
- 2024–25: 5th, in Group C (West Java zone)
Home colours	Away colours

Al Jabbar Football Club or Al Jabbar Cirebon is an Indonesian football club based in Pabuaran, Cirebon, West Java. They currently compete in the Liga 4.

== Honours ==
- Liga 3 West Java Series 2
  - Champions: 2022
