= Mashud Wisnusaputra Stadium =

- Interactive map of Mashud Wisnusaputra Stadium
- Location: Kuningan, Indonesia
- Coordinates: 6.9769°S 108.4854°E
- Owner: Kuningan Government
- Capacity: 10,000
- Surface: Grass

Tenants
- Pesik Kuningan; Persita Tangerang (temporary)

Mashud Wisnusaputra Stadium is a football stadium in Kuningan, Indonesia.

== History ==
The stadium is named after a famous local army intelligence officer Mashud Wisnusaputra.

== Other uses ==
Persita use this stadium for their 2013 Indonesia Super League home games. They play here, since there is a ban for them to play on their own Benteng Stadium. Local team Pesik Kuningan also use this stadium as their home base.

The stadium complex also have a basketball court, tennis court, volleyball court and athletic track lanes. It also has accommodation housing for athletes.
