= Perses Sumedang =

Indonesian football club

Perses
- Full name: Persatuan Sepakbola Sumedang
- Nickname: Laskar Insun Medal
- Founded: 1950; 76 years ago
- Ground: Ahmad Yani Stadium; Sumedang, Indonesia
- Capacity: 10,000
- Owner: PSSI Sumedang Regency
- Chairman: Agus Muslim
- Manager: Jaka Aminulloh Muslim
- Coach: Firmando
- League: Liga 4
- 2024–25: 5th, in Group A (West Java zone)
Home colours	Away colours

Persatuan Sepakbola Sumedang (simply known as Perses) is an Indonesian football club based in Sumedang, West Java. They currently compete in the Liga 4 West Java zone.

== 2010/2011 squad ==
Note: Flags indicate national team as defined under FIFA eligibility rules; some limited exceptions apply. Players may hold more than one non-FIFA nationality.

No.	Pos.	Nation	Player
1	GK	IDN	Ahmad Rifai (captain)
2	DF	IDN	Ridwan Setiawan
6	DF	IDN	Govani Toffy
8	DF	IDN	Jony Lambean
9	FW	IDN	Abdul Ghani Setya
14	MF	IDN	Anthon Rumangun
15	GK	IDN	Nurul Hadi

No.	Pos.	Nation	Player
17	MF	IDN	Saleh Wael
18	MF	IDN	Fachry Rizal
19	DF	IDN	Noor Huda
30	FW	IDN	Sucipto Alam
16	GK	IDN	Rizal Ohorella
99	FW	IDN	Maulana Ardiansyah
