= Persindra Indramayu =

Association football team in Indonesia

Persindra
- Full name: Persatuan Sepakbola Indramayu
- Nickname: Laskar Wiralodra (Wiralodra Warriors)
- Founded: 8 October 1966; 60 years ago
- Ground: Tridaya Stadium; Indramayu, West Java
- Capacity: 10,000
- Owner: PSSI Indramayu Regency
- Chairman: Deni Aryanto
- Manager: Bayu Satya Prawira
- Coach: Satria Nurzaman
- League: Liga 4
- 2025–26: Third round, 3rd in Group Y (West Java Series 1 zone); First round, 4th in Group I (National phase)
Home colours	Away colours

Persatuan Sepakbola Indramayu (simply known as Persindra) is an Indonesian football club based in Indramayu Regency, West Java. They currently compete in the Liga 4.

== History ==
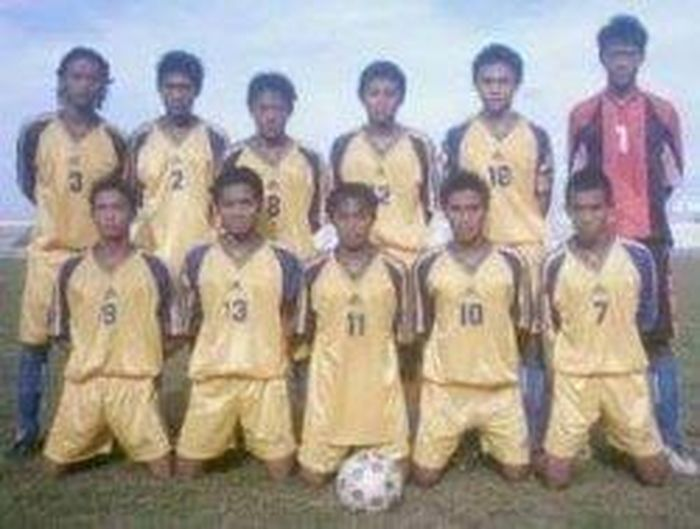
Persindra Indramayu squad photo when participating in the 10th West Java Sports Week in Karawang Regency in 2006.

Persindra Indramayu was established on 8 October 1966 and is based in Tridaya Stadium, Indramayu Regency, West Java. Persindra has supporters named Pandawa 1966 and Persindra Fans.

In 2022, Persindra coached by Rici Vauzi, won the Liga 3 West Java Series 2 for the first time after defeating Persikas Subang at Sabilulungan Field, Bandung Regency on 23 January 2022. Persindra managed to become champions after winning the match in the penalty shootout with a score of 4–3, after a 0–0 draw in full time.

== Season-by-season records ==
Season	League/Division	Tms.	Pos.	Piala Indonesia
2004	Second Division	40	eliminated in provincial phase	—
2005	Third Division		eliminated in provincial phase	—
2006	Third Division		eliminated in provincial phase	—
2007	Third Division		eliminated in provincial phase	—
2008	Third Division		eliminated in provincial phase	—
2009–10	Second Division		eliminated in provincial phase	—
2011				
2012
2013
2014
2015
2016	ISC Liga Nusantara	32	eliminated in provincial phase	—
2017	Liga 3	32	eliminated in provincial phase	—
2018	Liga 3	32	eliminated in provincial phase	—
2019				
2020	Liga 3	season abandoned		—
2021–22	Liga 3	64	eliminated in provincial phase	—
2022–23	Liga 3	season abandoned		—
2023–24	Liga 3	80	eliminated in provincial phase	—
2024–25	Liga 4	64	eliminated in provincial phase	—
2025–26	Liga 4	64	4th in Group I, first round	—

== Honours ==
- Liga 3 West Java Series 2
  - Champion (1): 2021
