= Persikasi Bekasi =

Indonesian football club

Persikasi
- Full name: Persatuan Sepakbola Indonesia Kabupaten Bekasi
- Nickname: Laskar Bendo Item
- Founded: 1961; 65 years ago
- Ground: Wibawa Mukti Stadium
- Capacity: 30,000
- Owner: Askab PSSI Bekasi
- Chairman: Reza Reynaldi
- Manager: Ade Rusiana
- Coach: Heriyanto
- League: Liga 4
- 2024–25: Second Round, 3rd in Group F (West Java zone); Second round, 4th in Group U (National phase)
| Home colours | Away colours |

Persatuan Sepakbola Indonesia Kabupaten Bekasi (simply known as Persikasi) is an Indonesian football club based in Bekasi Regency, West Java. They currently plays in Liga 4 West Java zone.

Persikasi have a rivalry with Persipasi Bekasi so called Bekasi derby.

== Players ==
=== Current squad ===
As of 12 April 2025

Note: Flags indicate national team as defined under FIFA eligibility rules; some limited exceptions apply. Players may hold more than one non-FIFA nationality.

| No. | Pos. | Nation | Player |
|---|---|---|---|
| — | GK | IDN | Endang K. |
| — | GK | IDN | Reza |
| — | DF | IDN | Soni Kurniawan |
| — | DF | IDN | Baihaqi Hafizh |
| — | DF | IDN | Azkiya Hafid Alim |
| — | DF | IDN | Sofyan Fadillah |
| — | DF | IDN | Al Fharidz |
| — | DF | IDN | Aldi Tri Nugroho |
| — | DF | IDN | Vieri |
| — | MF | IDN | Deni Muhammad |

| No. | Pos. | Nation | Player |
|---|---|---|---|
| — | MF | IDN | Afif Nashichan |
| — | MF | IDN | Panca Pamungkas |
| — | MF | IDN | Aditya Wibawa |
| — | MF | IDN | Totti Jr |
| — | MF | IDN | Ardiansyah |
| — | FW | IDN | Ariyana |
| — | FW | IDN | Ade Nurahmat |
| — | FW | IDN | Zery Sembiring |
| — | FW | IDN | Wibi Alprahmudi |
| — | FW | IDN | Viko |

== Honours ==
- Liga Indonesia Second Division
  - Champion (1): 2009–10
- Liga 3 West Java Series 1
  - Runners-up (1): 2019
  - Third-place (1): 2021–2022
