= Persitas Tasikmalaya =

Indonesian football club

- Full name: Persatuan Sepakbola Indonesia Tasikmalaya
- Nickname: Laskar Sukapura
- Founded: 23 December 1929; 96 years ago as Soekapoera Voetbalbond (Sukapura Football Association); 24 October 1970; 55 years ago as Persitas Tasikmalaya
- Ground: Wiradadaha Stadium; Tasikmalaya, West Java
- Capacity: 30,000
- Owner: Askab PSSI Tasikmalaya
- Manager: Basuki Rahmat
- Coach: Enur Nurdin
- League: Liga 4
- 2024–25: 4th, Second Round in Group E (West Java zone)
Home colours	Away colours

Persatuan Sepakbola Indonesia Tasikmalaya, commonly known as Persitas Tasikmalaya, is an Indonesian football club based in Tasikmalaya Regency, West Java that competes in Liga 4. Their home base is Wiradadaha Stadium.

== Honours ==
- Liga 3 West Java
  - Third-place: 2019
