= Persipo Purwakarta =

Indonesian football club

- Full name: Persatuan Sepakbola Indonesia Poerwakarta
- Nickname: Laskar Gunung Parang
- Founded: 1936; 90 years ago
- Ground: Purnawarman Stadium
- Capacity: 10,000
- Owner: Purwakarta Regency Government
- Chairman: H. Saepuddin
- Manager: Firmansyah
- Coach: Isman
- League: Liga 4
- 2023–24: 4th in Group D, (West Java zone); 5th in Group J, (National)
Home colours	Away colours

Persipo stand for Persatuan Sepakbola Indonesia Poerwakarta (English: Football Association of Indonesia Purwakarta) is an Indonesian football club based in Purnawarman Stadium, Purwakarta, Purwakarta Regency, West Java. Club played at Liga 4.
