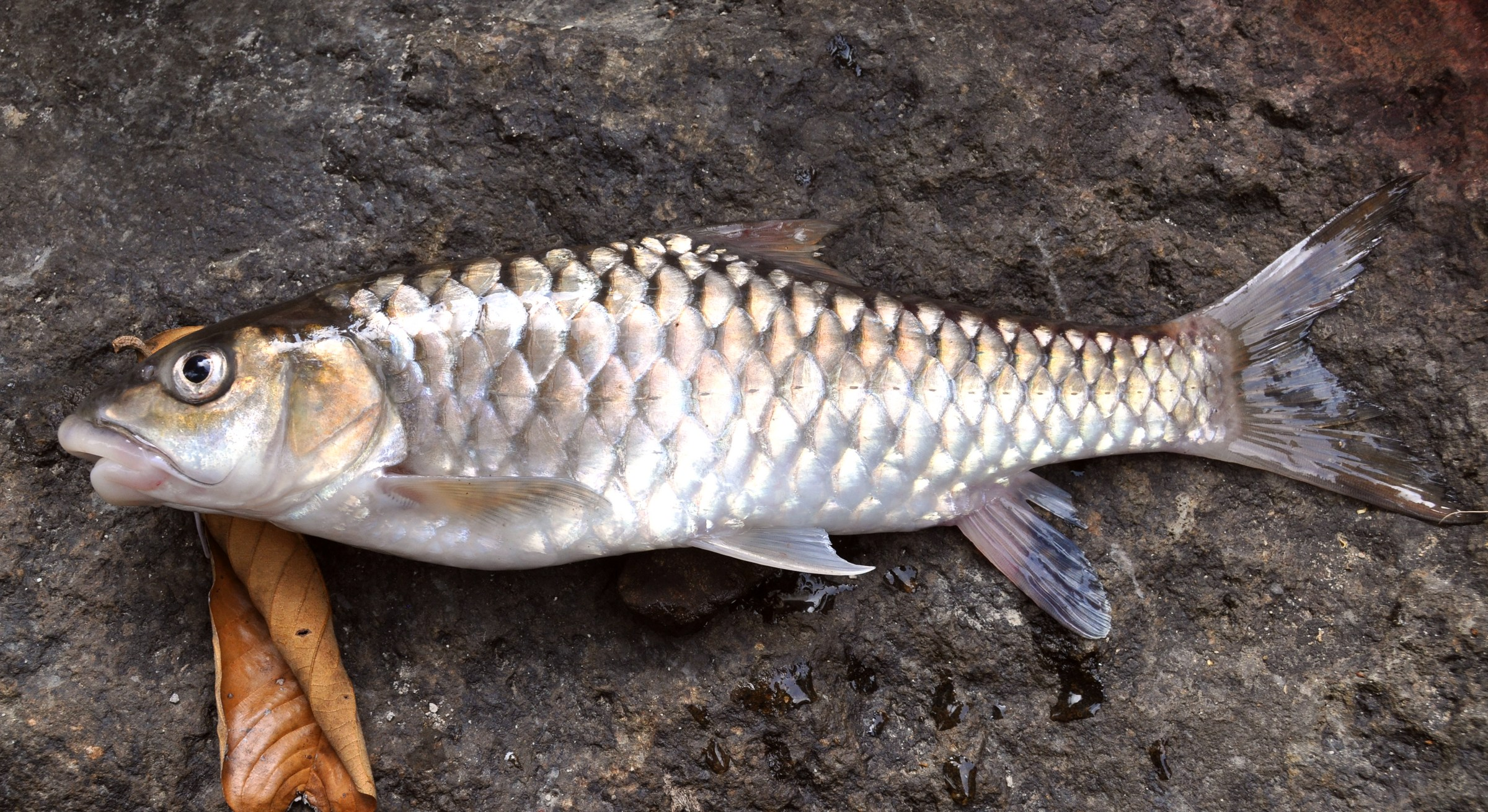
- Kelah/empurau/Semah selubai, Tor tambroides from Merangin, Indonesia

Conservation status
- Data Deficient (IUCN 3.1)

Scientific classification
- Kingdom: Animalia
- Phylum: Chordata
- Class: Actinopterygii
- Order: Cypriniformes
- Family: Cyprinidae
- Genus: Tor
- Species: T. tambroides

Binomial name
- Tor tambroides (Bleeker, 1854)

Synonyms
- Labeobarbus tambroides Bleeker, 1854; Barbus tambroides (Bleeker, 1854)

= Tor tambroides =

Species of fish

Tor tambroides, known as empurau in Malay, is a species of mahseer native to Southeast Asia.

== Taxonomy ==
It has been suggested that the species represents a junior synonym of Tor tambra. T. tambra, T. tambroides and T. douronensis may be synonymous.

The following cladogram is based on a 2021 phylogenetic study using 13 protein-coding genes and two ribosomal RNA with 1000 bootstrap replications:

- - Tor tambroides (Unknown locale)
  - - Pahang
      - Tor tambroides
      - Tor tambra
      - Tor tambra
    - - Sarawak
        - Tor tambroides
        - Tor tambroides
      - - - Sarawak
            Tor tambroides
          - Java
            - Tor tambra
            - Tor tambra
        - - Sarawak
            - Tor tambroides
            - Tor tambroides
          - - - Tor tambra (Terengganu)
              - Tor tambra (Terengganu)
              - Tor tambra (Unknown locale)
- - Tor tor
  - Tor barakae

== Distribution ==
These fish have been found throughout Southeast Asia, ranging from Thailand in the Chao Phraya and Mekong River basins to the Greater Sunda Islands. The species has been reported in Burma. The type locality of Tor tambroides is the Indonesian island of Sumatra.

== Ecology ==
The species is omnivorous, sometimes eating toxic fruits when the streams it inhabits flood the forest; this may make them temporarily inedible. During the rainy season, juveniles migrate downstream. After 2 months, matured adults travel back upstream to spawn at the headwaters in the dry season.

== Conservation ==
While the species is not currently assigned a conservation status by the IUCN due to lack of data, overfishing is assumed to threaten the wild population. The empurau, as the species is known in Malaysia, is reportedly the most expensive edible fish in the country and has been known to fetch up to RM1800 per kilogram of the fish.

== Aquaculture ==
Empurau can be grown in captivity. The fish require moving, well-oxygenated water. They should be fed on various fruits and seeds to simulate their natural diet. Artificial hormones may be necessary to induce reproduction. This species has been successfully hybridized with Barbonymus gonionotus, also through induced spawning.
