= T. sinensis =

T. sinensis may refer to:

- Tapiscia sinensis, a plant species
- Tenodera sinensis , a species of mantis
- Tephrinectes sinensis, a flatfish species
- Thliptoceras sinensis, a moth species
- Toona sinensis, a tree species
- Tor sinensis, a fish species
- Turbonilla sinensis, a sea snail species

== See also ==
- Sinensis
