= Kuningan Regency =

Regency in West Java, Indonesia

Kuningan Regency Kabupaten Kuningan
- Regency

Other transcription(s)
  - Sundanese: ᮊᮘᮥᮕᮒᮦᮔ᮪ ᮊᮥᮔᮤᮍᮔ᮪
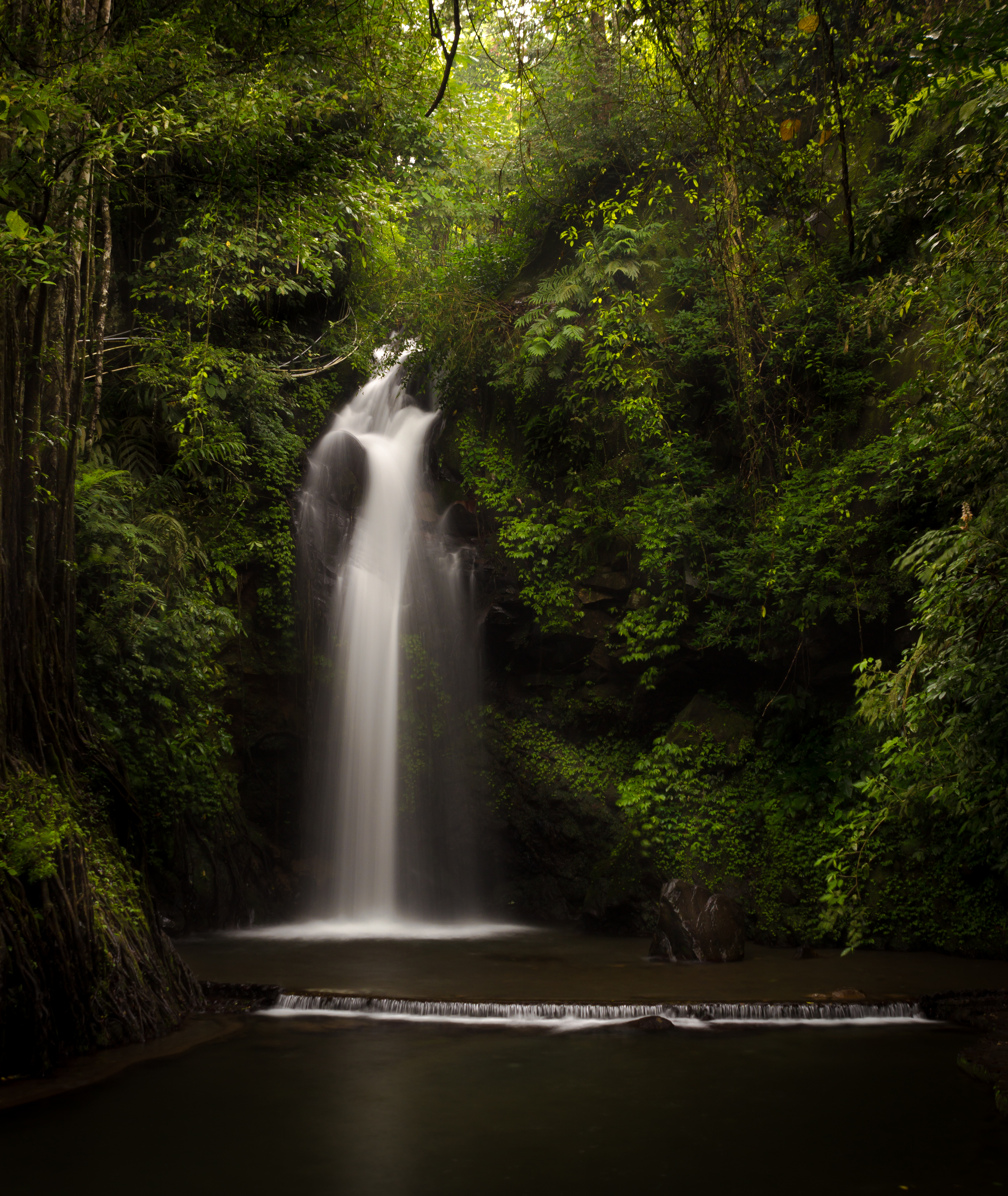
- Putri waterfall in Mount Ciremai National Park

- Coat of arms
- Motto(s): Aman Sehat Rindang Indah (Safe, Healthful, Shady, Beautiful)
- Location within West Java

- Location in Java and Indonesia Kuningan Regency (Indonesia)
- Coordinates: 6°58′34″S 108°29′04″E
- Country: Indonesia
- Province: West Java
- Established: 1 September 1948

Government
  - Regent: Dian Rachmat Yanuar
  - Vice Regent: Tuti Andriani

Area
  - Total: 1,194.09 km^{2} (461.04 sq mi)
- Elevation: 680 m (2,230 ft)

Population (mid 2025 estimate)
  - Total: 1,225,493
  - Density: 1,026.30/km^{2} (2,658.10/sq mi)
- Time zone: UTC+7 (Indonesia Western Time)
- Area code: +62 232
- Website: kuningankab.go.id

Kuningan Regency is a regency (kabupaten) of the West Java province of Indonesia. It covers an area of 1,194.09 km^{2}, and it had a population of 1,035,589 at the 2010 census and 1,167,686 at the 2020 census; the official estimate as of mid 2025 was 1,225,493 (comprising 620,199 males and 605,294 females). Kuningan Regency is located in the east of the province, south of Cirebon Regency, east of Majalengka Regency and northeast of Ciamis Regency, and bordering Central Java Province to the east and southeast. The town and district of Kuningan is its administrative capital.

== Etymology ==
The area of the eastern slopes and valley of Mount Cereme has been known as the Kuningan Duchy since the Hindu period as part of the Galuh Kingdom circa 14th century. The name "Kuningan" is believed to have come from the Sundanese word kuning meaning "yellow". An alternate theory suggests the name proliferated from the Sundanese word kuningan, a local name for brass, the metal which has been produced and used for hundreds of years in this area. According to the local tradition, the name Kuningan derived from Prince Arya Kuningan or Adipati Kemuning, a local hero and ruler of this region circa 1498.

== History ==
=== Prehistoric era ===
The oldest archaeological findings in the region were found in 1972, objects such as sherds, stone tools, gravestones, and ceramics were unearthed in the Cipari megalithic site with shreds of evidence from the bronze and iron metallurgical culture, assumed it belong to the Old Megalithicum age, from around 3500 BC to 1500 BC. Meanwhile, Ekadjati argues in his book that the Neolithic era spanned from 2500 BC to 1500 BC. After that era, the Megalithic era began until the early centuries of the Common Era. Based on findings, at those times, prehistoric humans in Kuningan were at the transition of semi-nomadic and pastoralism. They mainly lived near rivers and water springs on the eastern slopes of Mount Ciremai.

=== Hindu-Buddhist period ===
The area around Kuningan was originally under the control of the Tarumanagara Kingdom. After the split between the Galuh and Sunda kingdoms, Galuh ruled the region, the reference to which was found in the story of Parahyangan (Carita Parahyangan).

At the end of the 7th century, the Tarumanagara Kingdom collapsed. The Kuningan Kingdom, and other small kingdoms, came to rule the territory of the former Tarumanagara. The Kuningan Kingdom territory was situated between the Galuh and Indraprahasta Kingdoms. The first king of the kingdom was Sang Pandawa, also called Sang Wiragati.

In 671, Sang Pandawa married his daughter, Sangkari to Demunawan. He was the son of Danghiyang Guru Sempakwaja, a resiguru (clergy) of Sanghiyang (a fusion of ancestor-worshiping religion and Hinduism), based in Galunggung. However, Danghiyang Guru Sempakwaja disliked Sang Pandawa's behavior. He asked Sanjaya, the king of the Galuh Kingdom, to invade the Kuningan Kingdom which was still ruled by Sang Pandawa.

After the conflict, Danghiyang Guru Sempakwaja appointed Sang Pandawa a resiguru in Layuwatang. The king's position was then succeeded by Demunawan in 723 with the royal title of Rahiyangtang Kuku. During his rule, the capital city of the kingdom was Saunggalah (now in Salia Kampong, Ciherang Village, Nusaherang District). Parts of Galunggung were also absorbed by the Kuningan Kingdom under his reign.

Saunggalah was ruled by Rakeyan Dharmasiksa from 1163 to 1175. He was the son of Prabu Dharmakusuma, king of the Sunda Kingdom who had reigned 1157–1175. After the death of his father, Rakeyan Dharmasiksa succeeded as king of the Sunda Kingdom. As ruler of Saunggalah, he was then succeeded by his son Ragasuci, sometimes called Rajaputra. With the royal title of Rahiyang Saunggalah, he reigned until 1298. He married Dara Puspa, princess of Melayu Kingdom. Rahiyang Saunggalah then succeeded as king of the Sunda Kingdom in 1298 with the royal title of Prabu Ragasuci. In Saunggalah, he was then succeeded by his son Citragandha.

Ekadjati argues that based on this information, the rulers of the Kuningan Kingdom and the Sunda Kingdom were still relatives. Those two kingdoms were still distinct, not in the status of vassal and superior states, but the king of Kuningan had a lower status than the king of Sunda.

In the 14th century, the Galuh Kingdom unified the majority of lands of the Sundanese under its government. The Kuningan Kingdom then was absorbed into the former.

=== Islamic period ===
In the 15th century, an ulama and also a ruler named Syarif Hidayatullah settled in Cirebon, to spread Islam in this still pagan area. In the meantime, his pregnant wife Queen Ong-thien Nio from Ming China came to Kuningan and gave birth to a child named Prince of Kuningan. Prince of Kuningan established his realm and ascended the throne on 1 September 1498, a date regarded as the official establishment of Kuningan Regency since 1978.

In the 15th century, there were two settlements named Kuningan—the center of the present-day regency—and Luragung, located about 19 kilometers east of it. Luragung was home to notable figures such as Arya Kamuning (Bratawijaya) and Ki Gedeng Luragung (Jayaraksa). Those two along with Ratu Selawati were descendants of Prabu Siliwangi. As the influence of the Sunda Kingdom declined in the region and the Sultanate of Cirebon rose to power, the area’s predominantly Hindu-animist beliefs (locally known as Sanghiyang) began to be replaced by Islam. The three siblings later converted to Islam.

Another version of the story states that the Prince of Kuningan was the son of Ki Gedeng Luragung, who was later adopted by Sunan Gunung Jati. A third version claims that he was the son of Sheikh Maulana Arifin and Ratu Selawati.

Luragung and Kuningan were later unified into a single administrative region under the Sultanate of Cirebon, known as the Principality of Kuningan.

Arya Kamuning spread Islam with the assistance of Sunan Gunung Jati’s envoys, Prince Purwajaya and Prince Purwaganda, extending his efforts to the eastern and southern regions through cultural performances as a means of propagation. Areas such as Lebakwangi, Pasir Gulasagandu near Luragung, and the surroundings of the Cijolang River were relatively receptive to his teachings. Resistance, however, began to emerge in the southwestern areas near Talaga.

Prince of Kuningan was instructed by Sunan Gunung Jati to admonish Ki Gedeng Plumbon, another disciple of Sunan Gunung Jati, who was regarded as propagating a deviant interpretation of Islam in Cigugur. When persuasion proved ineffective, the Duke ultimately resorted to physical measures to resolve the matter.

In 1528, the Kingdom of Galuh planned an invasion of the Sultanate of Cirebon. As the invading forces would pass through Kuningan, Cirebon requested military assistance from the region. Prince of Kuningan led battles in several areas, including the foothills of Mount Gundul, Rajagaluh, and Palimanan. Although the Kuningan forces were initially outnumbered and pushed back, they eventually repelled the Galuh attack with reinforcements from Cirebon and Demak.

After the death of the Prince of Kuningan, he was reportedly succeeded by his son, Geusan Ulun, who is believed to have ruled from the late 16th century to the mid-17th century. Geusan Ulun is believed to have had up to 50 children, many of whom became village leaders within his domain. After his death, he was succeeded by his son, who held the title Dalem Mangkubumi.

After Dalem Mangkubumi’s rule, the leadership of Kuningan became unclear. The region is believed to have been contested between the Sultanate of Cirebon, the Sultanate of Mataram, and the Dutch East India Company (VOC).

=== Colonial era ===
According to Dutch historical records from the early 18th century, the Kuningan principality had about 100 families—or roughly 400 to 500 inhabitants—in the main Kuningan village, while surrounding villages contained around 5,800 families, totaling between 25,000 and 30,000 people. The interregional route connecting Kawali, Ciamis, and Cirebon passed through Sangkanhurip, Cigugur, and Darma, and was accessible by horseback.

Since 2 February 1809, the Dutch colonial government implemented the Reglement op het beheer van de Cheribonsche Landen (“Regulation on the Administration of the Cirebon Lands”), dividing Cirebon into two prefectures: Cirebon and Priangan-Cirebon. Under the Cirebon prefecture, two districts were located within the area of present-day Kuningan Regency—Cikaso District and Kuningan District. Contemporary statistics recorded populations of 9,488 and 12,277 respectively, with 547 and 430 jung of rice fields.

In 1819, another administrative reorganization took place in Cirebon. The region became a Residency divided into five regencies, including Kuningan. The northern boundary of Kuningan Regency extended from the Cisande River to the summit of Mount Ciremai. The western boundary ran from Mount Ciremai to the Cijolang River, the southern boundary from the Cijolang River to the Cilacap Regency, and the eastern boundary from the Cijolang River to the confluence of the Cilosari and Cisande Rivers.

In the 1930s, many of the residents moved to Sumatra and Kalimantan to work in oil and gas mines.

=== Post-Independence period ===
A notable event in Indonesian history occurred in Kuningan when the Linggadjati Agreement was signed between the Indonesian and Dutch governments on 15 November 1946, in the village of Linggajati within the regency. There is a dedicated small museum in the village, about 25 km from Cirebon, which records the events of the Linggadjati conference.

In the 1950s, due to the insurgency of Kartosuwiryo, many of the residents moved to Jakarta and other large cities on Java Island.

== Geography ==
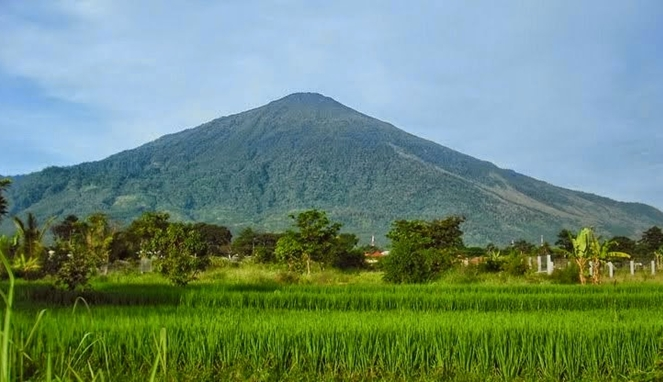
Mount Cereme (3,078 m), the highest point in West Java, located between Kuningan and Majalengka Regency

Kuningan is located in the eastern part of West Java. It is bordered by Cirebon Regency to the north, Majalengka Regency to the west, Ciamis Regency and Cilacap Regency to the south, and by Brebes Regency and Cilacap Regency (both in Central Java Province) to the east and southeast. The regency capital is the town of Kuningan. Its mean elevation is 680 metres (2,520 ft) above sea level. The regency's landscape is composed of volcanoes, steep terrain, forests, mountains rivers, and fertile agricultural land. The highest mountain in the province, Ciremai (3,076 m) is located between the border of this regency and Majalengka Regency. There are numerous tropical rainforests in Kuningan, which contain tree species such as Pinus (Pinus merkusii), teureup (Artocarpus elasticus), yellow mahogany (Dysoxylum caulostachyum), langsat (Lansium domesticum), and putat (Planchonia valida).

Kuningan has an area of 1,194.09 km^{2}. The western and southern parts are relatively mountainous, around 266–720 m above sea level, while the eastern and northern parts are lower, between 120 and 220 m. Most of the rivers in the regency flow toward the Java Sea from the western and southern to the northern and eastern parts of the regency. The exception is the Jolang River, which flows southward to the Indian Ocean.

In Darma District, there is the Darma Dam (Waduk Darma) functioning as a clean water and irrigation source, fish farm, and tourist destination. The construction of the dam was started in 1942, but it was completed in the early 1960s. A legendary creature in the form of a giant white eel was believed by residents as the reason for the lengthy duration of the construction.

== Demographics ==
=== Population ===
According to the 2000 census, Kuningan had 958,753 residents which made the density 813/km^{2}. Around 83% of them were in rural area, while the rest were in the city (regency) center. The field of works varied at that time: 169,509 people were in agriculture, 1,355 in mining, 24,965 in processing industry, 1,084 in water, gas, and electricity, 24,474 in constructions and engineering, 1,995 in commerce, 19,342 in transportation, 1,626 in finance, 41,851 in services, and the rest of 769 were in other fields.

According to the 2010 census, Kuningan's population was 1,035,589 people, consisting of 520,632 males and 514,957 females. The population was 97% Muslim, 2% Catholics and 1% followers of other religions. Its ethnic composition consisted of Sundanese 95%, Javanese 2%, and other groups 3%. The 2020 census showed a population of 1,167,686, while the official estimate as at mid 2025 was 1,225,463. In addition to Indonesian, the official national language, the other widely spoken language in the regency is Sundanese. In some areas near the eastern border with Central Java, Javanese and Banyumasan are also spoken.

== Economy ==
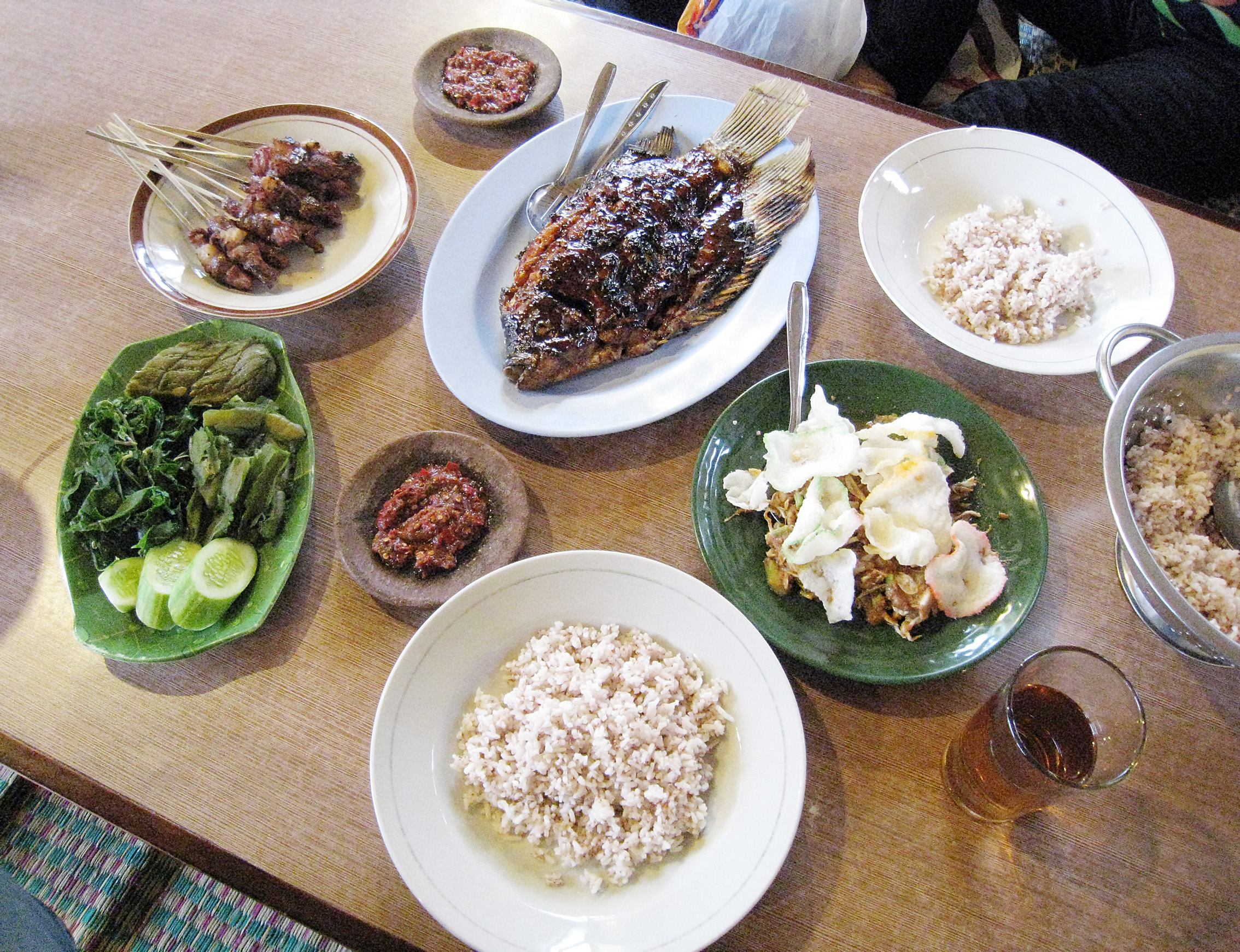
Sundanese cuisine at a restaurant near Sangkanhurip hot spring, Kuningan.

Small scale enterprise in the regency includes the production of patchouli oil, an essential oil produced from Patchouli. But the cost and quality of patchouli oil produced in the area still needs to be improved. The selling price of patchouli in the region fluctuates markedly. This reflects several factors including market access to end users and the role of national brokers in the marketing chain. Standards of processing and refining of raw materials are not of high standards. Distillation is done at the local level and quality is still low (not meeting ISO levels). Amongst other things, this is because farmers who are producing local patchouli oil do not pay attention to factors such as the treatment of raw materials, the proportion of patchouli stems used with leaves, distillation methods, types of material used, reliance on solar stills, and inappropriate cooling and circulation techniques in production.

Quality improvement efforts that need to be adopted include improving the quality of the Fe (iron) content of patchouli oil because excessive levels make the oil too dark. Purification can reduce levels of iron from as high as 340.2 ppm down to 104.5 ppm. Further, densities that too small or too large reduce the low percentage of essential oil which can recovered.

Identification of the main components of local patchouli oil indicates a value of patchouli alcohol (PA) of about 27-29%. Improved treatment of material to be distilled can raise levels of PA to about 30-32%.

== Administrative divisions ==
The Kuningan Regency has an area of 1,194.09 km^{2}; with an average population density of over 1,000 people per km^{2} in 2022. It is divided into 32 districts (kecamatan), subdivided in turn into 376 villages (rural desa and urban kelurahan). These are listed below with their areas and their populations at the 2010 census and the 2020 census, together with the official estimates as at mid 2025. The table also includes the location of the district administrative centres, the number of villages in each district (totaling 361 rural desa and 15 urban kelurahan), and its postal codes.

Kode Wilayah	Name of District (kecamatan)	Area in sq. km	Pop'n 2010 census	Pop'n 2020 census	Pop'n mid 2025 estimate	Admin centre	Number of villages	Post codes
32.08.17	Darma	54.51	45,144	53,503	57,333	Parung	19	45562
32.08.01	Kadugede	18.11	24,127	27,938	29,603	Cipondok	12	45561
32.08.20	Nusaherang	18.09	17,511	20,111	21,225	Nusaherang	8	45563
32.08.02	Ciniru	49.76	17,688	20,181	21,231	Ciniru	9	45565
32.08.26	Hantara	35.37	12,831	14,548	15,259	Hantara	8	45564
32.08.15	Selajambe	36.61	13,041	13,588	13,681	Selajambe	7	45566
32.08.03	Subang	47.49	16,057	15,847	15,641	Subang	7	45586
32.08.25	Cilebak	42.67	10,842	11,429	11,572	Cilebak	7	45585
32.08.04	Ciwaru	51.98	30,152	31,199	31,307	Ciwaru	12	45583
32.08.29	Karangkancana	65.30	20,578	21,989	22,411	Karangkancana	9	45584
32.08.05	Cibingbin	69.72	36,503	39,358	40,289	Cibingbin	10	45587
32.08.28	Cibeureum	39.20	18,649	20,177	20,689	Cibeureum	8	45588
32.08.06	Luragung	40.74	37,335	46,051	50,310	Luragunglandeuh	16	45581 & 45582
32.08.24	Cimahi	58.39	35,590	31,246	30,840	Cimahi	10	45582
32.08.11	Cidahu	37.05	39,805	44,491	46,343	Cidahu	12	45595
32.08.27	Kalimanggis	20.18	23,254	26,338	27,611	Kalimanggis Kulon	6	45594
32.08.10	Ciawigebang	60.41	80,759	94,371	100,438	Ciawigebang	24	45591 ^{(a)}
32.08.21	Cipicung	19.02	26,010	29,250	30,558	Mekarsari	10	45592 ^{(b)}
32.08.07	Lebakwangi	19.70	39,283	46,473	49,756	Lebakwangi	13	45574
32.08.30	Maleber	57.36	40,779	44,503	45,822	Maleber	16	45574 & 45575
32.08.08	Garawangi	29.85	39,271	43,549	45,189	Garawangi	17	45571 & 45572
32.08.31	Sindangagung	13.01	34,060	39,386	41,706	Sindangagung	12	45573
32.08.09	Kuningan (town)	29.94	91,370	109,913	118,632	Kuningan	16 ^{(c)}	45511: 45518 ^{(d)}
32.08.18	Cigugur	35.29	42,387	47,861	50,099	Cigugur	10 ^{(e)}	45552
32.08.16	Kramatmulya	16.87	45,988	45,861	45,266	Kalapagunung	14	45553
32.08.12	Jalaksana	39.21	43,219	48,960	51,331	Jalaksana	15	45553 & 45554
32.08.23	Japara	27.07	18,350	22,403	24,354	Japara	10	45555
32.08.13	Cilimus	35.30	44,605	51,878	55,087	Cilimus	13	45551
32.08.32	Cigandamekar	22.43	27,532	32,820	35,268	Babakanjati	11	45556
32.08.14	Mandirancan	35.00	20,393	24,098	25,786	Mandirancan	12	45558
32.08.22	Pancalang	19.20	21,472	25,296	27,028	Pancalang	13	45557
32.08.19	Pasawahan	49.27	21,004	23,070	23,828	Pasawahan	10	45559
	Totals	1,194.09	1,035,589	1,167,686	1,225,493		376	

Notes: (a) except the village of Cihirup (with a post code of 45593). (b) except the village of Mekasari (with a post code of 45576).
(c) comprising 10 kelurahan (Awirarangan, Cigintung, Cijoho, Ciporang, Cirendang, Citangtu, Kuningan, Purwawinangun, Winduhaji and Windusengkahan) and 6 desa.
(d) except the villages of Kasturi and Padarek (both with a post code of 45553).
(e) comprising 5 kelurahan (Cigadung, Cigugur, Cipari, Sukamulya and Winduherang) and 5 desa.

== Tourism ==
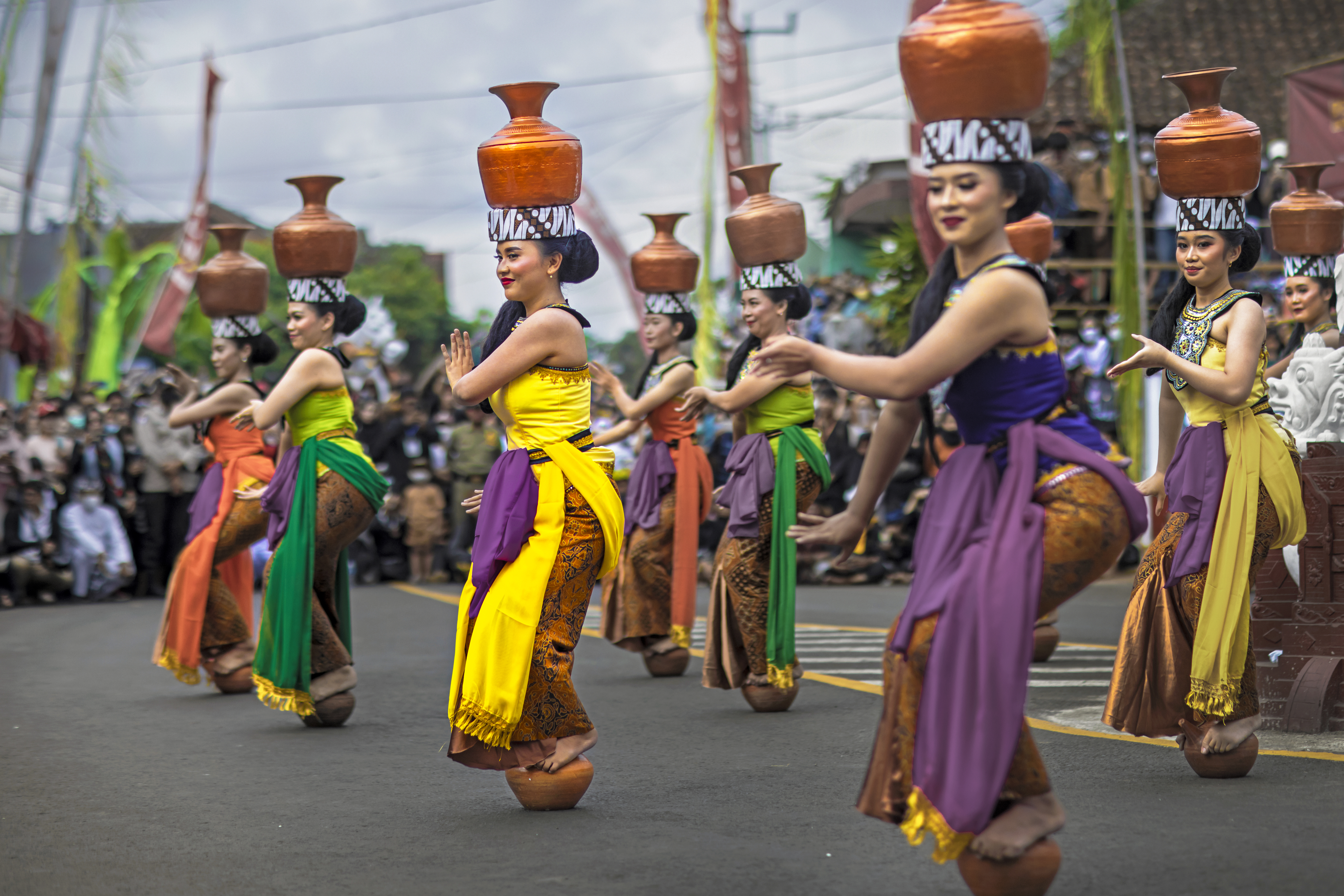
Buyung dance performance during Seren Taun Sundanese harvest festival in Cigugur, Kuningan

=== Tourist destinations ===
There are several tourist locations in Kuningan Regency such as: the Linggarjati Museum, Sangkanhurip Hot Springs, Cibulan and Cigugur fish pond, Darma Dam (Waduk Darma), Cipari's Ancient settlement, and Talaga Remis (Remis Lake).

The area of Palutungan, a new location tourist destination, is known as the "Lembang of Kuningan" (Lembang and is a famous tourist destination near Bandung), located at 1,100 metres above sea level which has fresh air, good views and an 8-metre waterfall. The waterfall called Curug Putri (Lady Waterfall) is located in Cisantana village, Cigugur District. The traveller from Kuningan to Palutungan can pass through Cigugur fish pond and Cisantana Maria retreat cave.

There is a presumed distinct species in Kuningan that can only be found in lakes in Darmaloka, Cigugur, Cibulan, and Linggarjati called kancra fish or dewa fish. In Sangkanhurip village, there are hot springs containing sulfur. In Cigugur, there is a historical structure called Paseban Tritunggal (or Paseban Tri Panca Tunggal) built by Javanese-Sundanese local religion (Madraisme). Cipari Museum, a prehistoric themed museum, is also located in Cigugur.

=== Kuningan Botanical Garden ===
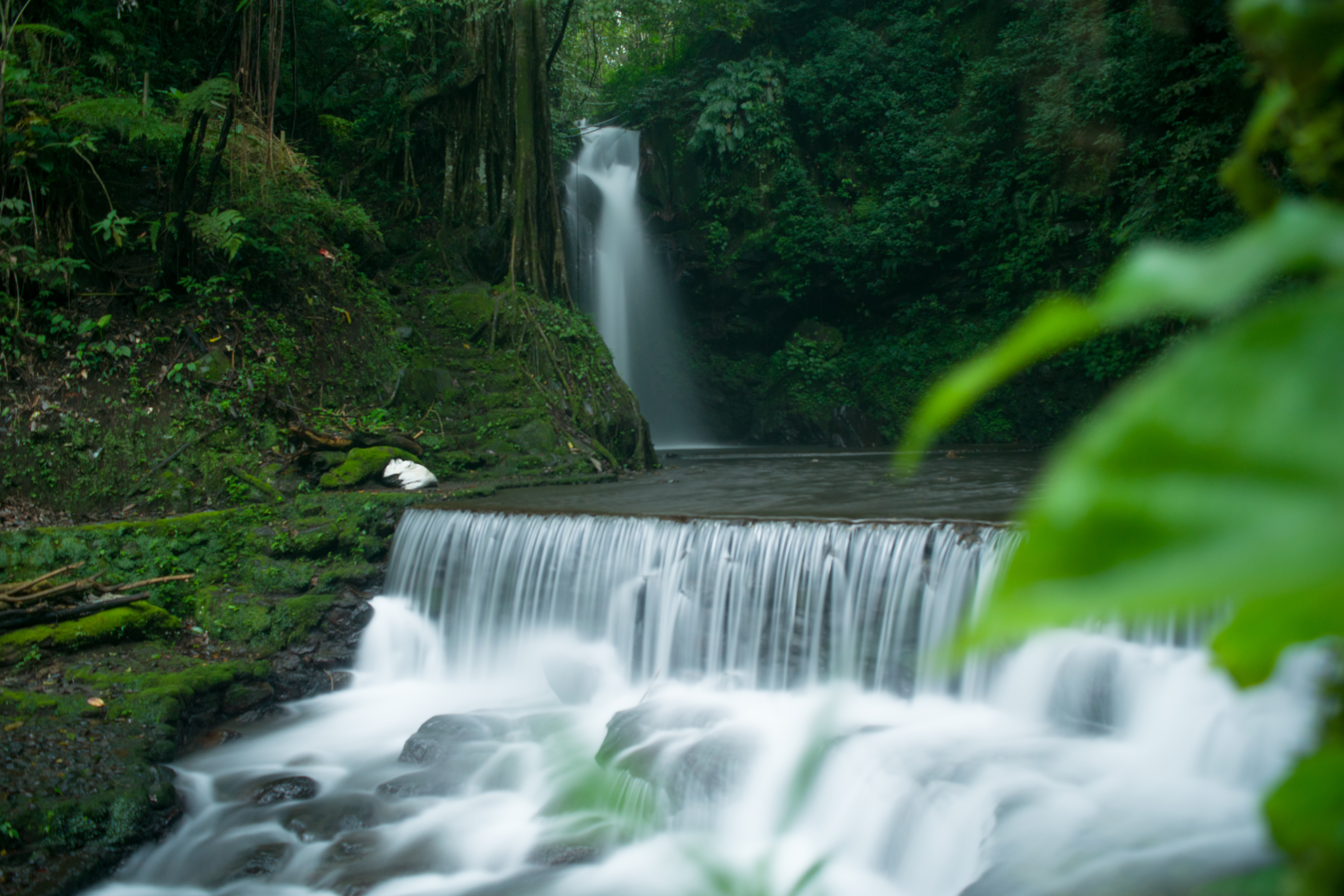
Curug Putri waterfall within Mount Ciremai National Park

Kuningan Botanical Garden in Padabeunghar Village is 154.9 hectares and in September 2012, 29 hectares was on fire which killed 10,014 trees of 30 species. All of the burnt trees which are planted in 2007 have not yet catalogued because of its pioneer status.

== Sports ==
Kuningan is the home town of the Pesik football team. Its home base is Mashud Wisnusaputra Stadium. Other potential sports in Kuningan is athletics.

== Bibliography ==
- Ekadjati, Edi S. (2021). Sejarah Kuningan: Dari Masa Prasejarah hingga Terbentuknya Kabupaten [History of Kuningan: From Prehistoric Era Until the Formation of Regency] (2nd ed.). Kiblat. ISBN 978-623-221-248-0.
