= Tor sinensis =

Conservation status
- Vulnerable (IUCN 3.1)

Scientific classification
- Kingdom: Animalia
- Phylum: Chordata
- Class: Actinopterygii
- Order: Cypriniformes
- Family: Cyprinidae
- Genus: Tor
- Species: T. sinensis

Binomial name
- Tor sinensis H. W. Wu, 1977

Species of fish

Tor sinensis, the Chinese or Red mahseer is a species of mahseer native to the Mekong River. It is known with certainty only from Yunnan, China; reports from Cambodia, Laos, and Thailand require confirmation.
It is one of four currently valid species described from China, the others being Tor laterivittatus (dark-striped mahseer), Tor polylepis (multi-scaled mahseer), and Tor yingjiangensis (Yingjiang mahseer).

== Description ==
Tor sinensis grows to 46.5 cm (18.3 in) in standard length. Juveniles are silvery, but adults and subadults have a deep, dark midlateral stripe. The body is darkish above and brownish beneath. Pectoral, pelvic, and caudal fins are deep red.

Maurice Kottelat is among those who claim that insufficient work has been done on establishing specimens from confirmed species populations when identifying mahseer species. This is common across the species of Southeast Asia in particular, and includes claimed distinctions between Tor sinensis and Tor laterivattatus.

Huang et al. claim to have determined the complete mitochondrial genome of Tor sinensis, which, if the species identification is correct, will be a useful tool in establishing identities of the mahseers of this region.

== Habitat and ecology ==
Tor sinensis is found in larger streams and rivers in clear gravel and cobble beds. They are migratory and omnivorous, feeding on plant material (including fruits), fish, crustaceans, and other invertebrates.

== Conservation ==
This species is currently assigned as Vulnerable by the IUCN. As with many other species of mahseer, a major constraining factor in any conservation strategy is the relative lack of understanding of the distribution and ecology of the species and how or if it interacts with other local mahseer species within the same habitat. With other mahseer species, the main threats are: loss of habitat due to urbanisation, encroachment on flood plains, dam building, sand extraction and pollution. Destructive fishing methods like dynamite, poisoning and electricity are in common use throughout Southeast Asia, and may be expected to be a major threat to the sustainability of populations. It is reported that the fragmentation of the various populations within the wider Mekong River basin is a threat to genetic variability. This will have long term implications for conservation, due to the threat of inbreeding.

== Uses ==
Tor sinensis is caught in local subsistence fisheries.
