= Ciremai =

Ciremai may refer to:

- Mount Ciremai, a volcano in West Java, Indonesia
- Mount Ciremai National Park, a park surrounding the volcano
- Ciremai (train), an Indonesian passenger train
