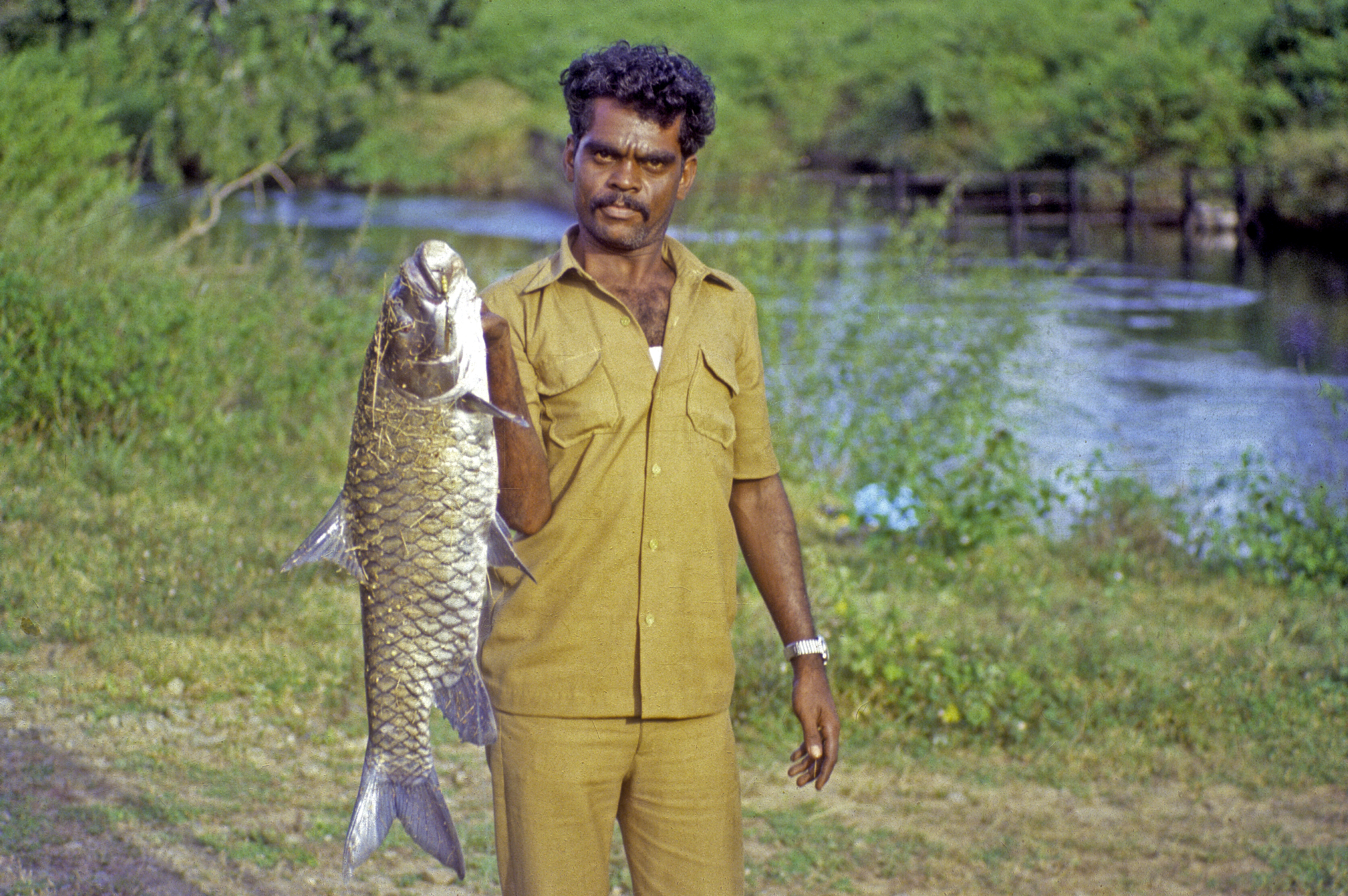
- A blue-finned mahseer being held by a man

Conservation status
- Data Deficient (IUCN 3.1)

Scientific classification
- Kingdom: Animalia
- Phylum: Chordata
- Class: Actinopterygii
- Order: Cypriniformes
- Family: Cyprinidae
- Genus: Tor
- Species: T. tambra

Binomial name
- Tor tambra (Valenciennes, 1842)

Synonyms
- Barbus tambra Valenciennes, 1842; Labeobarbus tambra (Valenciennes, 1842) ior synonym); Tor mekongensis Hoang, Pham, Durand, Tran & Phan, 2015

= Tor tambra =

Species of fish

Tor tambra, the Javan mahseer, is a species of mahseer native to Southeast Asia.

== Taxonomy ==
Tor tambra is a typical mahseer, with Cyprinidae features, large scales and a large head comparative to body depth. It is usually longer and slimmer bodied than some other species and head length to body depth measurements are among the critical taxonomic features used for identification. A reddish body colour gives rise to the name kelah merah (red mahseer) in some parts of mainland Malaysia. There have been suggestions that the size and length of the median lobe may be a key to species identity, but this has been proven to be a mistake. Most species of mahseer demonstrate both thick-lipped, large median lobe and thin-lipped, small median lobe morphotypes. T. tambra, T. tambroides and T. douronensis may be synonymous.

The following cladogram is based on a 2021 phylogenetic study using 13 protein-coding genes and two ribosomal RNA with 1000 bootstrap replications:

- - Tor tambroides (Unknown locale)
  - - Pahang
      - Tor tambroides
      - Tor tambra
      - Tor tambra
    - - Sarawak
        - Tor tambroides
        - Tor tambroides
      - - - Sarawak
            Tor tambroides
          - Java
            - Tor tambra
            - Tor tambra
        - - Sarawak
            - Tor tambroides
            - Tor tambroides
          - - - Tor tambra (Terengganu)
              - Tor tambra (Terengganu)
              - Tor tambra (Unknown locale)
- - Tor tor
  - Tor barakae

== Distribution ==
These fish have been found throughout Southeast Asia, ranging from Thailand in the Chao Phraya and Mekong River basins to the Greater Sunda Islands and Malaysia. The type locality of Tor tambra is the Indonesian island of Java.

== Ecology ==
Common to all mahseer species, Tor tambra is omnivorous, sometimes eating toxic fruits when the streams it inhabits flood the forest; this may make them temporarily inedible. The fruits of the invasive cash crop, oil palm Palm oil, known in Malaysia as sawit, are often devoured eagerly by mahseer in streams that flow near to plantations. There are suggestions that during the rainy season, juveniles migrate downstream and that after 2 months, mature adults travel back upstream to spawn at the headwaters in the dry season. It would seem more likely that adult fish access headwaters during high water conditions.

== Conservation ==
This species is another mahseer currently assigned as Data Deficient by the IUCN. The vast majority of scientific work done on this species has been conducted on stock produced by artificial breeding, with assumptions made about the ecology of wild stocks. Dam building, loss of habitat and over-fishing using destructive methods are the main threats to wild populations. There are also concerns about the genetic integrity and breeding success of wild stocks that have been mixed with releases of artificially-bred stocks. The empurau, as the species is known in Malaysia, is reportedly the most expensive edible fish in the country, and has been known to fetch up to RM1800 per kilogram of the fish. While wild Tor tambra fetch up to RM 900 per kilo.

== Aquaculture ==
Across the region, there are many breeding centres for Tor tambra. There are several specialist aquaculture bodies who offer support and guidelines for when breeding fish like Tor tambra. Among the guidelines that should be adhered to when breeding mahseer, the following are some of the most important:

- Ideally, brood stock and offspring should be housed in-stream
- Brood stock should be cleared-out and replaced at least every two years
- Larvae and fingerlings should be fed with natural, live foodstuffs like Daphnia and Chironomidae
- Any diseased or infirm stock should be destroyed immediately
- Bred fish should not be introduced to the wild without following IUCN conservation stocking guidelines following consultation with the relevant local authorities.
