= Tor ater =

Conservation status
- Near Threatened (IUCN 3.1)

Scientific classification
- Kingdom: Animalia
- Phylum: Chordata
- Class: Actinopterygii
- Order: Cypriniformes
- Family: Cyprinidae
- Genus: Tor
- Species: T. ater

Binomial name
- Tor ater Roberts, 1999

Species of fish

Tor ater, the dark mahseer, is a species of mahseer, a fish, native to Central Laos.

== Taxonomy ==
Tor ater is slightly different from other mahseer, although possessing many typical Cyprinidae features. This mahseer has relatively small scales, with 30 or 31 along the lateral line, but still has a large head comparative to body depth. Compared to another small-scaled mahseer of the Mekong basin, Tor polylepis, Tor ater differs by having slightly larger scales, fewer gill rakers and a concave-shaped snout.

== Distribution ==
This fish is poorly known, even among local fishermen in the Nam Theun watershed where it is found. The type locality of Tor ater is Ban Talang, in the Nam Theun watershed, part of the Mekong basin, in central Laos.

== Ecology ==
It may be expected that Tor ater has similarities with all other mahseer species, being omnivorous, with a diet that likely includes aquatic and terrestrial invertebrates, fruit and vegetation, small amphibians and other fish. It would seem probable that adult fish access headwaters for spawning during high water conditions.

== Conservation ==
This species is currently assigned as Near Threatened by the IUCN. Given that the species is identified from the capture of only three specimens, and that little work has been done beyond the initial identification, the major constraining factor in any conservation strategy is the complete lack of understanding of the distribution and ecology of the species and how or if it interacts with other local mahseer species within the same habitat. With other mahseer species, the main threats are: loss of habitat due to urbanisation, encroachment on flood plains, dam building, sand extraction and pollution. Destructive fishing methods like dynamite, poisoning and electricity are in common use throughout Southeast Asia, and may be expected to be a major threat to the sustainability of populations.
