= Nini Pelet =

West Javanese Legend

Nini Pelet (also known as Nyi Pelet) is a legend from West Javanese folklore associated with Mount Ciremai, the highest peak in West Java.

== Mythology and Lore ==
According to tradition, Nini Pelet is the guardian of Mount Ciremai. Her kingdom is said to be located in Gua Walet (Swallow Cave), situated near the mountain's summit. She is depicted as a powerful sorceress who maintains eternal beauty and youth despite being centuries old.

The most prominent aspect of her legend involves a conflict with the sage Ki Buyut Mangun Tapa. Nini Pelet is said to have stolen a sacred manuscript from him called the Kitab Mantra Asmara (The Book of Love Mantras). This book contained powerful spells, most notably the Jaran Goyang. In Indonesian occultism, this spell is legendary for its supposed ability to make a person fall uncontrollably in love with the caster. Nini Pelet reportedly used these enchantments to manipulate young men and officials to maintain her youth.

== Attributes ==
Nini Pelet is characterized by her immense mystical strength and martial arts prowess. Lore frequently depicts her accompanied by or riding a one-eyed tiger, a creature that serves as both her spiritual guardian and her mount. Her primary rivalry is with the sage Ki Buyut Mangun Tapa, who reportedly sent his disciple, Restu Singgih, to retrieve the stolen manuscript.

== Cultural Impact ==
The legend of Nini Pelet became a significant fixture of Indonesian popular culture during the 1990s. This prominence was largely driven by the radio drama Misteri Nini Pelet, which enjoyed widespread popularity throughout the 1980s and 1990s.

In television adaptations, the actress **Leily Sagita** became the most recognizable face of the character, achieving fame for her iconic portrayal of the sorceress’s malevolent laugh. The legend has had a lasting linguistic influence; Nini Pelet's name is widely considered the origin of the modern Indonesian term "**pelet**," a general word used to describe love charms or spells used to attract someone through supernatural means.

== See also ==
- Mak Lampir
- Nyi Roro Kidul
