= Subang =

Subang may refer to:

== Indonesia ==
- Subang, Kuningan, a town and district in Kuningan Regency, West Java
- Subang Regency, a regency of West Java
  - Subang, Subang, a town and district in Subang Regency, West Java

== Malaysia ==
- Subang (federal constituency), represented in the Dewan Rakyat
- Subang (state constituency), formerly represented in the Selangor State Legislative Assembly (1986–95)
- Subang, Selangor, an affluent residential town in Selangor state
- Subang Jaya, an affluent suburban city in Selangor state near Kuala Lumpur
- Subang Jaya (state constituency), represented in the Selangor State Legislative Assembly (1995–present)
- Sultan Abdul Aziz Shah Airport, formerly Subang International Airport
