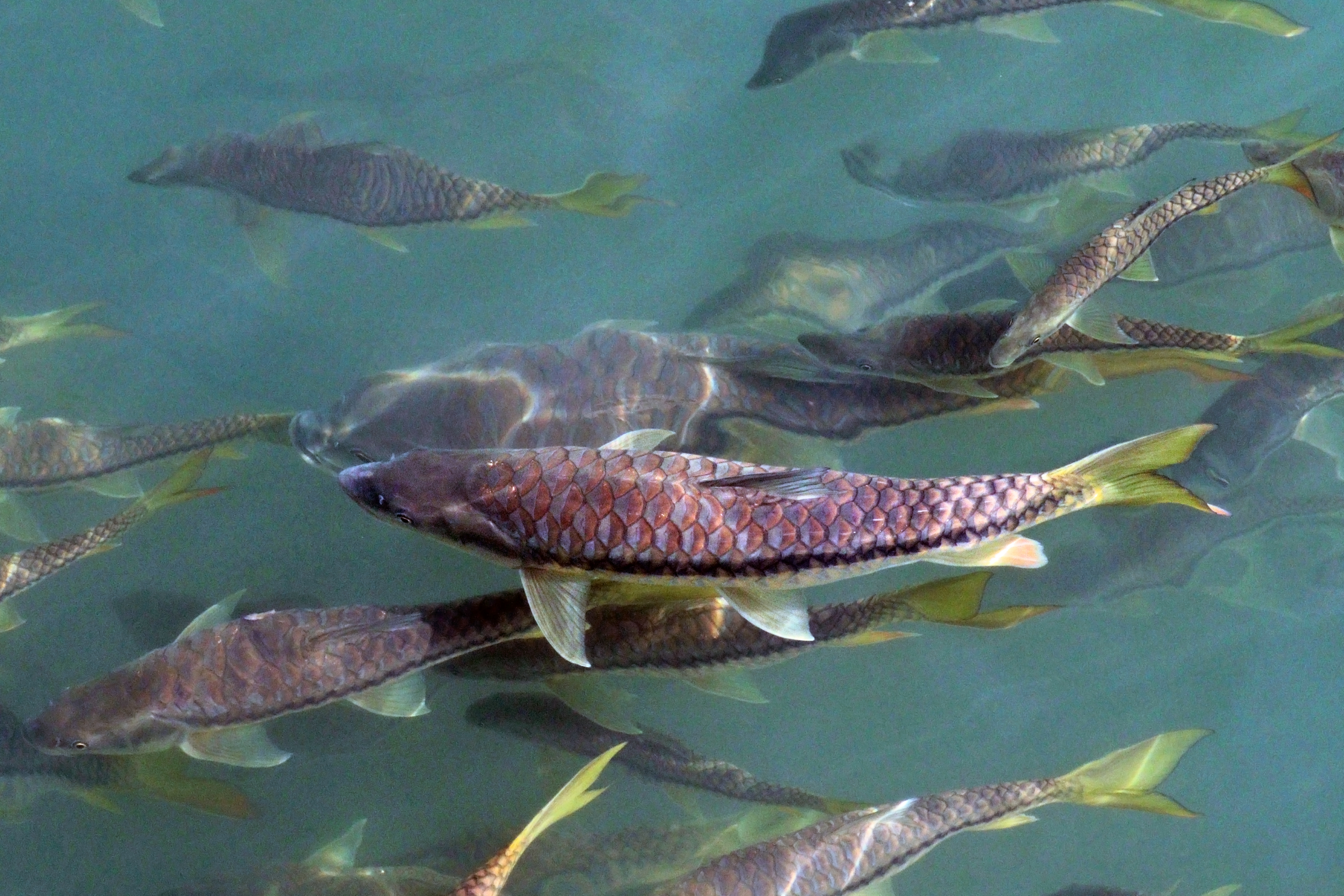
- Golden mahseer (Tor putitora) Babai River, Nepal
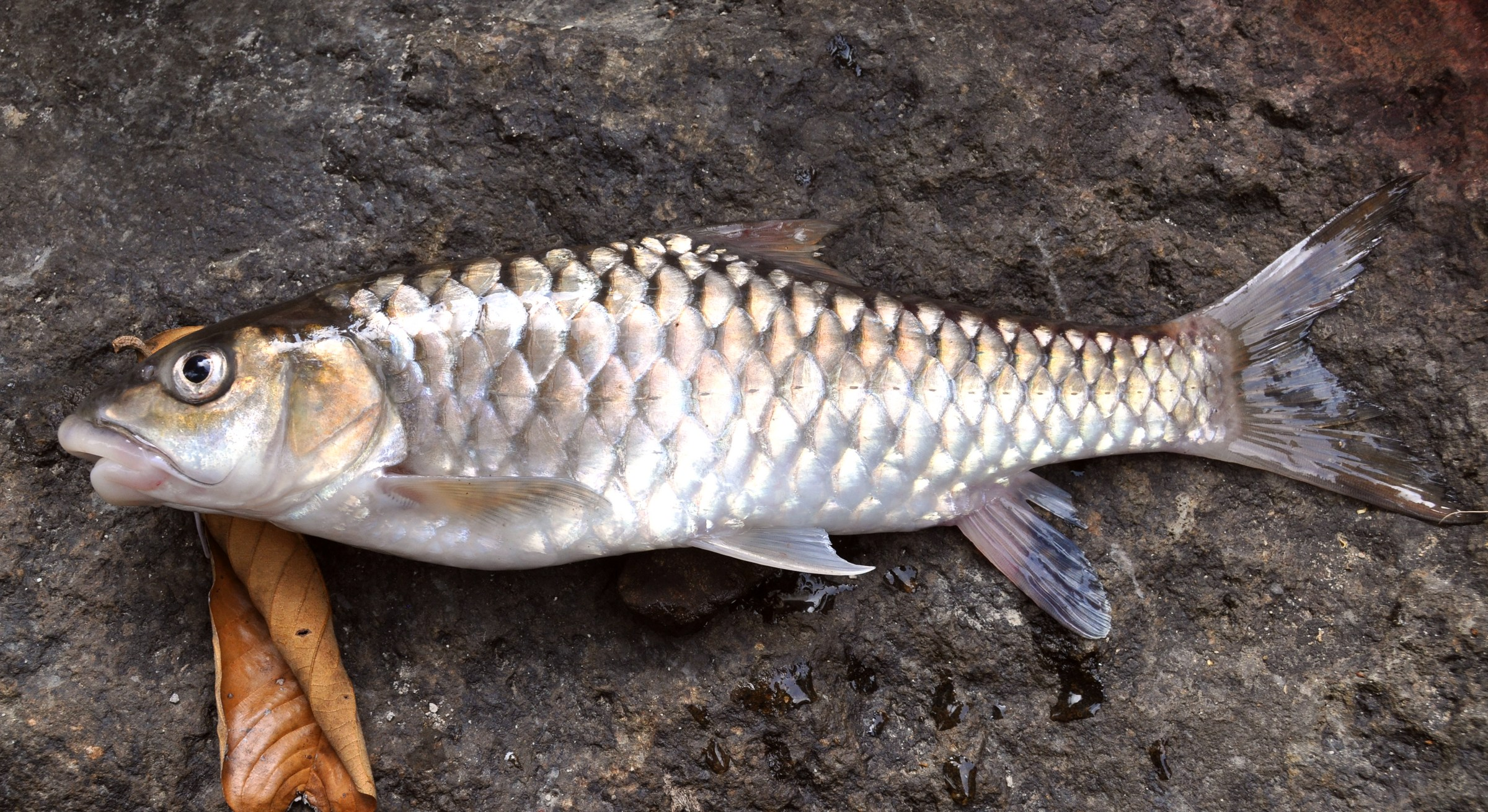
- Tor tambroides, a controversial species

Scientific classification
- Kingdom: Animalia
- Phylum: Chordata
- Class: Actinopterygii
- Order: Cypriniformes
- Suborder: Cyprinoidei
- Family: Cyprinidae
- Genus: Tor; J. E. Gray, 1833

Type species
- Tor hamiltonii Gray, 1834

= Tor (fish) =

Genus of fishes

Tor is a genus of freshwater ray-finned fishes belonging to the family Cyprinidae, the family which includes the carps, barbs and related fishes. The fishes in this genus, and some related genera, are commonly known as mahseers, though this genus is often distinguished as the true mahseer.. These fishes are found in Asia.

== Species ==
Tor is distinguished from its relatives, such as Naziritor and Neolissochilus, by the presence of a median lobe on the mandible/lower lip. The median lobe may alternatively be described as an "interrupted fold or groove".

The currently recognized species in this genus are:

- Tor ater Roberts, 1999 (dark mahseer)
- Tor barakae Arunkumar & Basudha, 2003
- Tor dongnaiensis H. Đ. Hoàng, H. M. Phạm, J.-D. Durand, N. T. Trần & P. D. Phan, 2015 (Dongnai mahseer)
- Tor douronensis (Valenciennes, 1842)
- Tor khudree (Sykes, 1839) (black mahseer)
- Tor kulkarnii Menon, 1992 (dwarf mahseer)
- Tor laterivittatus W. Zhou & G. H. Cui, 1996
- Tor malabaricus (Jerdon, 1849) (Malabar mahseer)
- Tor polylepis Zhou & Cui, 1996
- Tor putitora (Hamilton, 1822) (Himalayan mahseer)
- Tor remadeviae Kurup & Radhakrishnan, 2007 (orange-finned mahseer)
- Tor sattalensis Shahi et al., 2026
- Tor sinensis H. W. Wu, 1977 (Chinese mahseer)
- Tor tambra (Valenciennes, 1842)
- Tor tambroides (Bleeker, 1854) (Malayan mahseer, empurau)
- Tor tor (Hamilton, 1822) (red-finned mahseer)
- Tor yingjiangensis Z. M. Chen & J. X. Yang, 2004 (Yingjiang mahseer)

The genetically distinct yellow mahseer of Sri Lanka, sometimes referred to as Tor khudree longispinis, may be recognized as its own species.

The following cladogram is based on a phylogenetic tree rendered by maximum likelihood analysis of the first concatenated dataset from a 2024 study, with undescribed species being left unnamed or marked with cf.:

- - Hypselobarbus thomassi
  - Hypselobarbus jerdoni
- - - Varicorhinus maroccanus
    - Labeobarbus intermedius
  - - Neolissochilus benasi
    - - ⊞Tor spp.
        ⊟
        - - Tor remadeviae
          - Tor sinensis
        - - - Tor putitora
            - Tor yingjiangensis
          - - Tor khudree
            - - - Tor malabaricus
                - - Tor barakae
                  - - Tor tor
                    - - Tor mosal
                      - - Tor tor
                        - Tor mosal
              - - Tor sp.1 (Ban Chaung)
                - - - Tor sp.2 (Putao Market, from the Irrawaddy)
                    - Tor tambroides
                  - - Tor sp.3 (Manipur)
                    - - Tor mekongensis
                      - - - Tor tambra (West Malaysia)
                          - - Tor tambra (Java)
                            - - Tor tambroides (Java)
                              - - Tor tambra (West Malaysia)
                                - Tor tambroides (East Malaysia)
                        - - Tor dongnaiensis
                          - - Tor tambra (Mekong)
                            - - Tor dongnaiensis
                              - Tor tambra (Mekong)
      - Neolissochilus spp.
