= Thliptoceras amamiale =

Scientific classification
- Domain: Eukaryota
- Kingdom: Animalia
- Phylum: Arthropoda
- Class: Insecta
- Order: Lepidoptera
- Family: Crambidae
- Genus: Thliptoceras
- Species: T. amamiale

Binomial name
- Thliptoceras amamiale Munroe & Mutuura, 1968

Species of moth

Thliptoceras amamiale is a moth in the family Crambidae. It was described by Eugene G. Munroe and Akira Mutuura in 1968. It is found in Japan. Records for China refer to Thliptoceras sinensis.
