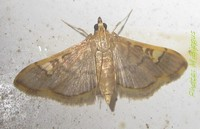

Scientific classification
- Domain: Eukaryota
- Kingdom: Animalia
- Phylum: Arthropoda
- Class: Insecta
- Order: Lepidoptera
- Family: Crambidae
- Subfamily: Pyraustinae
- Genus: Thliptoceras; Warren in C. Swinhoe, 1890

Synonyms
- Mimocomma Warren, 1895; Parudea C. Swinhoe, 1900; Polychorista Warren, 1896

= Thliptoceras =

Genus of moths

Thliptoceras is a genus of moths of the family Crambidae. The genus was erected by William Warren in 1890.

== Species ==
- Thliptoceras althealis (Walker, 1859)
- Thliptoceras amamiale Munroe & Mutuura, 1968
- Thliptoceras anthropophilum Bänziger, 1987
- Thliptoceras artatalis (Caradja, 1925)
- Thliptoceras bicuspidatum Zhang, 2014
- Thliptoceras bisulciforme Zhang, 2014
- Thliptoceras buettikeri Munroe, 1967
- Thliptoceras calvatalis C. Swinhoe, 1890
- Thliptoceras caradjai Munroe & Mutuura, 1968
- Thliptoceras cascalis (C. Swinhoe, 1890)
- Thliptoceras decoloralis (Warren, 1896)
- Thliptoceras distictalis Hampson, 1899
- Thliptoceras epicrocalis C. Swinhoe, 1890
- Thliptoceras fenestratum Aurivillius, 1910
- Thliptoceras filamentosum Zhang, 2014
- Thliptoceras fimbriata (C. Swinhoe, 1900)
- Thliptoceras formosanum Munroe & Mutuura, 1968
- Thliptoceras fulvale de Joannis, 1932
- Thliptoceras fulvimargo (Warren, 1895)
- Thliptoceras fuscociliale (Snellen, 1895)
- Thliptoceras gladialis (Leech, 1889)
- Thliptoceras impube Zhang, 2014
- Thliptoceras lacriphagum Bänziger, 1987
- Thliptoceras neotropicalis Schaus, 1912
- Thliptoceras polygrammodes Hampson, 1899
- Thliptoceras semicirculare Zhang, 2014
- Thliptoceras shafferi Bänziger, 1987
- Thliptoceras sinensis (Caradja, 1925)
- Thliptoceras stygiale Hampson, 1896
- Thliptoceras umoremsugente Bänziger, 1987

== Former species ==
- Thliptoceras elegans Guillermet, 1996
