= Thliptoceras epicrocalis =

Scientific classification
- Domain: Eukaryota
- Kingdom: Animalia
- Phylum: Arthropoda
- Class: Insecta
- Order: Lepidoptera
- Family: Crambidae
- Genus: Thliptoceras
- Species: T. epicrocalis

Binomial name
- Thliptoceras epicrocalis C. Swinhoe, 1890

Synonyms
- Circobotys marginalis Hampson, 1891

Species of moth

Thliptoceras epicrocalis is a moth in the family Crambidae. It was described by Charles Swinhoe in 1890. It is found in Myanmar and India.
