= Thliptoceras fulvale =

Scientific classification
- Domain: Eukaryota
- Kingdom: Animalia
- Phylum: Arthropoda
- Class: Insecta
- Order: Lepidoptera
- Family: Crambidae
- Genus: Thliptoceras
- Species: T. fulvale

Binomial name
- Thliptoceras fulvale de Joannis, 1932

Species of moth

Thliptoceras fulvale is a moth in the family Crambidae. It was described by Joseph de Joannis in 1932. It is found on Mauritius.
