= Thliptoceras calvatalis =

Scientific classification
- Domain: Eukaryota
- Kingdom: Animalia
- Phylum: Arthropoda
- Class: Insecta
- Order: Lepidoptera
- Family: Crambidae
- Genus: Thliptoceras
- Species: T. calvatalis

Binomial name
- Thliptoceras calvatalis C. Swinhoe, 1890

Species of moth

Thliptoceras calvatalis is a moth in the family Crambidae. It was described by Charles Swinhoe in 1890. It is found in Myanmar.
