= Thliptoceras anthropophilum =

Scientific classification
- Domain: Eukaryota
- Kingdom: Animalia
- Phylum: Arthropoda
- Class: Insecta
- Order: Lepidoptera
- Family: Crambidae
- Genus: Thliptoceras
- Species: T. anthropophilum

Binomial name
- Thliptoceras anthropophilum Bänziger, 1987

Species of moth

Thliptoceras anthropophilum is a moth in the family Crambidae. It was described by Hans Bänziger in 1987. It is found in Thailand (Chiang Mai) and Yunnan, China.
