= Thliptoceras bicuspidatum =

Scientific classification
- Domain: Eukaryota
- Kingdom: Animalia
- Phylum: Arthropoda
- Class: Insecta
- Order: Lepidoptera
- Family: Crambidae
- Genus: Thliptoceras
- Species: T. bicuspidatum

Binomial name
- Thliptoceras bicuspidatum Zhang, 2014

Species of moth

Thliptoceras bicuspidatum is a moth in the family Crambidae. It was described by Zhang in 2014. It is found in Guangdong, China.

The wingspan is about 28 mm.
