= Thliptoceras formosanum =

Scientific classification
- Domain: Eukaryota
- Kingdom: Animalia
- Phylum: Arthropoda
- Class: Insecta
- Order: Lepidoptera
- Family: Crambidae
- Genus: Thliptoceras
- Species: T. formosanum

Binomial name
- Thliptoceras formosanum Munroe & Mutuura, 1968

Species of moth

Thliptoceras formosanum is a moth in the family Crambidae. It was described by Eugene G. Munroe and Akira Mutuura in 1968. It is found in China in Fujian, Jiangxi, Guangdong, Guangxi and Guizhou and in Taiwan.

The wingspan is 18–24 mm.
