= Thliptoceras neotropicalis =

Scientific classification
- Domain: Eukaryota
- Kingdom: Animalia
- Phylum: Arthropoda
- Class: Insecta
- Order: Lepidoptera
- Family: Crambidae
- Genus: Thliptoceras
- Species: T. neotropicalis

Binomial name
- Thliptoceras neotropicalis Schaus, 1912

Species of moth

Thliptoceras neotropicalis is a moth in the family Crambidae. It was described by Schaus in 1912. It is found in Costa Rica.
