= Thliptoceras artatalis =

Scientific classification
- Domain: Eukaryota
- Kingdom: Animalia
- Phylum: Arthropoda
- Class: Insecta
- Order: Lepidoptera
- Family: Crambidae
- Genus: Thliptoceras
- Species: T. artatalis

Binomial name
- Thliptoceras artatalis (Caradja, 1925)

Synonyms
- Crocidophora artatalis Caradja, 1925; Thliptoceras artatale

Species of moth

Thliptoceras artatalis is a moth in the family Crambidae. It was described by Aristide Caradja in 1925. It is found in southern China in Zhejiang, Fujian, Jiangxi, Guangdong, Guangxi, Hainan and Guizhou.

The wingspan is 22–28 mm. The wings are yellow with a contrasting brown termen.
