= Thliptoceras umoremsugente =

Scientific classification
- Domain: Eukaryota
- Kingdom: Animalia
- Phylum: Arthropoda
- Class: Insecta
- Order: Lepidoptera
- Family: Crambidae
- Genus: Thliptoceras
- Species: T. umoremsugente

Binomial name
- Thliptoceras umoremsugente Bänziger, 1987

Species of moth

Thliptoceras umoremsugente is a moth in the family Crambidae. It was described by Hans Bänziger in 1987. It is found in Thailand.

The wingspan is 22–24 mm. The forewings are light yellow to greyish yellow, with greyish shadows. Adult males have been observed sucking perspiration from the skin of humans and lachrymation (tears) at the eye of an elephant. It has also been observed sucking on blood droplets exuded by mosquitoes on elephants.

== Etymology ==
The species name refers to one of its feeding habits, i.e. the sucking of body fluids.
