= Tor dongnaiensis =

Conservation status
- Near Threatened (IUCN 3.1)

Scientific classification
- Kingdom: Animalia
- Phylum: Chordata
- Class: Actinopterygii
- Order: Cypriniformes
- Family: Cyprinidae
- Genus: Tor
- Species: T. dongnaiensis

Binomial name
- Tor dongnaiensis H. Đ. Hoàng, H. M. Phạm, J.-D. Durand, N. T. Trần & P. D. Phan, 2015

Species of fish

Tor dongnaiensis, common name Dongnai manseer, is a species of cyprinid of the genus Tor. It inhabits Vietnam's Đồng Nai and is considered harmless to humans. It has a maximum length among unsexed males of 41.1 centimetres (16.2 in). Described in 2015, it has been assessed as "near threatened" on the IUCN Red List.
