= Thliptoceras distictalis =

Scientific classification
- Kingdom: Animalia
- Phylum: Arthropoda
- Class: Insecta
- Order: Lepidoptera
- Family: Crambidae
- Genus: Thliptoceras
- Species: T. distictalis

Binomial name
- Thliptoceras distictalis Hampson, 1899

Species of moth

Thliptoceras distictalis is a moth in the family Crambidae. It was described by George Hampson in 1899. It is found in Myanmar.
