= Thliptoceras stygiale =

Scientific classification
- Kingdom: Animalia
- Phylum: Arthropoda
- Class: Insecta
- Order: Lepidoptera
- Family: Crambidae
- Genus: Thliptoceras
- Species: T. stygiale

Binomial name
- Thliptoceras stygiale Hampson, 1896

Species of moth

Thliptoceras stygiale is a moth in the family Crambidae. It was described by George Hampson in 1896. It is found in India's Naga Hills.
