= Thliptoceras fulvimargo =

Scientific classification
- Domain: Eukaryota
- Kingdom: Animalia
- Phylum: Arthropoda
- Class: Insecta
- Order: Lepidoptera
- Family: Crambidae
- Genus: Thliptoceras
- Species: T. fulvimargo

Binomial name
- Thliptoceras fulvimargo (Warren, 1895)

Synonyms
- Mimocomma fulvimargo Warren, 1895; Crocidophora fulvimargo

Species of moth

Thliptoceras fulvimargo is a moth in the family Crambidae. It was described by William Warren in 1895. It is found in China (Guangxi), India (Khasia Hills) and Myanmar.

The wingspan is about 25 mm. The wings are smoky fuscous.
