= Thliptoceras buettikeri =

Scientific classification
- Domain: Eukaryota
- Kingdom: Animalia
- Phylum: Arthropoda
- Class: Insecta
- Order: Lepidoptera
- Family: Crambidae
- Genus: Thliptoceras
- Species: T. buettikeri

Binomial name
- Thliptoceras buettikeri Munroe, 1967

Species of moth

Thliptoceras buettikeri is a moth in the family Crambidae. It was described by Eugene G. Munroe in 1967. It is found in Thailand.
