= Thliptoceras fimbriata =

Scientific classification
- Domain: Eukaryota
- Kingdom: Animalia
- Phylum: Arthropoda
- Class: Insecta
- Order: Lepidoptera
- Family: Crambidae
- Genus: Thliptoceras
- Species: T. fimbriata

Binomial name
- Thliptoceras fimbriata (C. Swinhoe, 1900)

Synonyms
- Parudea fimbriata C. Swinhoe, 1900

Species of moth

Thliptoceras fimbriata is a moth in the family Crambidae. It was described by Charles Swinhoe in 1900. It is found in northern China.
