= Tor kulkarnii =

Conservation status
- Data Deficient (IUCN 3.1)

Scientific classification
- Kingdom: Animalia
- Phylum: Chordata
- Class: Actinopterygii
- Order: Cypriniformes
- Family: Cyprinidae
- Genus: Tor
- Species: T. kulkarnii

Binomial name
- Tor kulkarnii Menon, 1992

Synonyms
- Tor kulkarni Menon, 1992

Species of fish

Tor kulkarnii (common name: dwarf mahseer) is a species of cyprinid of the genus Tor. It inhabits mountain streams in India and has a maximum length among unsexed males of 20.8 centimetres (8.2 in). It is classified as "data deficient" on the IUCN Red List and is considered harmless to humans.
