= Thliptoceras shafferi =

Scientific classification
- Domain: Eukaryota
- Kingdom: Animalia
- Phylum: Arthropoda
- Class: Insecta
- Order: Lepidoptera
- Family: Crambidae
- Genus: Thliptoceras
- Species: T. shafferi

Binomial name
- Thliptoceras shafferi Bänziger, 1987

Species of moth

Thliptoceras shafferi is a moth in the family Crambidae. It was described by Hans Bänziger in 1987. It is found in Guangdong and Guangxi in China and Chiang Mai in Thailand.

The wingspan is 23–26 mm. Adult males have been recorded sucking human perspiration.

== Etymology ==
The species is named for Mr. M. Shaffer.
