= Tor barakae =

Conservation status
- Near Threatened (IUCN 3.1)

Scientific classification
- Kingdom: Animalia
- Phylum: Chordata
- Class: Actinopterygii
- Order: Cypriniformes
- Family: Cyprinidae
- Genus: Tor
- Species: T. barakae

Binomial name
- Tor barakae (Arunkumar & Basudha, 2003)

Species of fish

Tor barakae is a species of mahseer native to Manipur, India.

== Taxonomy ==
This mahseer was described as a distinct species due to taxonomic differences between it and the other mahseers of the trans-Himalayan region; Tor putitora, Tor tor and Tor mosal. In the description paper, many of the taxonomic features used for comparison do not reference the original descriptions of those species, rather, the referenced data are from more recent studies by Indian ichthyologist Menon. However, compared to Hamilton's original descriptions of the mahseers of trans-Himalaya, the meristic counts for the pectoral fin bear consideration. Tor barakae has 14 rays in this fin, whereas Tor putitora has 15, Tor tor has 18 and Tor mosal has 17.

== Distribution ==
So far, the little research conducted on this mahseer species has all been done in the Barak River, mostly in the Indian state of Manipur. Given that this is a trans-boundary river, shared between India and Bangladesh, it may be assumed that Tor barakae is a resident of both. Wider distributions within the Brahmaputra River basin are not yet ascertained. Its presence in Bangladesh is confirmed using DNA barcoding of mahseer from the Sangu River.

In the Barak Bridge area where the initial studies were conducted, this fish is called 'Nung nga'.

== Ecology ==
As all other mahseer species are omnivorous, it may be expected that Tor barakae is the same, with a diet that likely includes aquatic and terrestrial invertebrates, fruit and vegetation, small amphibians and other fish. It would seem probable that adult fish access headwaters for spawning during high water conditions.

== Conservation ==
This species is currently assigned as Near Threatened by the IUCN. Given that the species is identified from the capture of only five specimens, and that little work has been done beyond the initial identification, the major constraining factor in any conservation strategy is the complete lack of understanding of the distribution and ecology of the species and how or if it interacts with other local mahseer species within the same habitat. With other mahseer species, the main threats are: loss of habitat due to urbanisation, encroachment on flood plains, dam building, sand extraction and pollution. Destructive fishing methods like dynamite, poisoning and electricity are in common use throughout South and Southeast Asia, and may be expected to be a major threat to the sustainability of populations.

There has been some work completed on the habitat suitability and capabilities of the river system to support mahseers and other fishes . Given that the Barak River is known to be very dynamic, the plans to straighten and dredge the river for use as part of the national water highway system must raise the level of threat to these fish.
