= Thliptoceras fuscociliale =

Scientific classification
- Kingdom: Animalia
- Phylum: Arthropoda
- Class: Insecta
- Order: Lepidoptera
- Family: Crambidae
- Genus: Thliptoceras
- Species: T. fuscociliale

Binomial name
- Thliptoceras fuscociliale (Snellen, 1895)

Synonyms
- Botys fuscociliale Snellen, 1895

Species of moth

Thliptoceras fuscociliale is a moth in the family Crambidae. It was described by Snellen in 1895. It is found on Java.
