= Thliptoceras filamentosum =

Scientific classification
- Domain: Eukaryota
- Kingdom: Animalia
- Phylum: Arthropoda
- Class: Insecta
- Order: Lepidoptera
- Family: Crambidae
- Genus: Thliptoceras
- Species: T. filamentosum

Binomial name
- Thliptoceras filamentosum Zhang, 2014

Species of moth

Thliptoceras filamentosum is a moth in the family Crambidae. It was described by Zhang in 2014. It is found in China in Jiangxi and Guangdong.

The wingspan is 20–22 mm.
