= Thliptoceras gladialis =

Scientific classification
- Domain: Eukaryota
- Kingdom: Animalia
- Phylum: Arthropoda
- Class: Insecta
- Order: Lepidoptera
- Family: Crambidae
- Genus: Thliptoceras
- Species: T. gladialis

Binomial name
- Thliptoceras gladialis (Leech, 1889)

Synonyms
- Botys gladialis Leech, 1889; Crocidophora rufitinctalis Hampson, 1918; Thliptoceras gladiale

Species of moth

Thliptoceras gladialis is a moth in the family Crambidae. It was described by John Henry Leech in 1889. It is found in China in Fujian, Guangdong and Yunnan and in Taiwan.

The wingspan is 23–26 mm.
