= Thliptoceras polygrammodes =

Scientific classification
- Kingdom: Animalia
- Phylum: Arthropoda
- Class: Insecta
- Order: Lepidoptera
- Family: Crambidae
- Genus: Thliptoceras
- Species: T. polygrammodes

Binomial name
- Thliptoceras polygrammodes Hampson, 1899

Species of moth

Thliptoceras polygrammodes is a moth in the family Crambidae. It was described by George Hampson in 1899. It is found in South Africa.
