= Thliptoceras decoloralis =

Scientific classification
- Domain: Eukaryota
- Kingdom: Animalia
- Phylum: Arthropoda
- Class: Insecta
- Order: Lepidoptera
- Family: Crambidae
- Genus: Thliptoceras
- Species: T. decoloralis

Binomial name
- Thliptoceras decoloralis (Warren, 1896)

Synonyms
- Ebulea decoloralis Warren, 1896; Pyrausta torridalis Hampson, 1896

Species of moth

Thliptoceras decoloralis is a moth in the family Crambidae. It was described by Warren in 1896. It is found in India, where it has been recorded from the Khasia Hills and Naga Hills.
