= Thliptoceras cascalis =

Scientific classification
- Domain: Eukaryota
- Kingdom: Animalia
- Phylum: Arthropoda
- Class: Insecta
- Order: Lepidoptera
- Family: Crambidae
- Genus: Thliptoceras
- Species: T. cascalis

Binomial name
- Thliptoceras cascalis (C. Swinhoe, 1890)

Synonyms
- Hapalia cascalis C. Swinhoe, 1890; Circobotys phycidalis Snellen, 1890; Thliptoceras variabilis Warren in C. Swinhoe, 1890

Species of moth

Thliptoceras cascalis is a moth in the family Crambidae. It was described by Charles Swinhoe in 1890. It is found in the Indian state of Sikkim and in Myanmar.
