= Thliptoceras althealis =

Scientific classification
- Kingdom: Animalia
- Phylum: Arthropoda
- Class: Insecta
- Order: Lepidoptera
- Family: Crambidae
- Genus: Thliptoceras
- Species: T. althealis

Binomial name
- Thliptoceras althealis (Walker, 1859)

Synonyms
- Salbia althealis Walker, 1859; Botys cydipeialis Walker, 1859; Botys tisiasalis Walker, 1859; Phycidicera manicalis Snellen, 1880

Species of moth

Thliptoceras althealis is a moth in the family Crambidae. It was described by Francis Walker in 1859. It is found on Sumatra and Borneo.
