= Thliptoceras caradjai =

Scientific classification
- Domain: Eukaryota
- Kingdom: Animalia
- Phylum: Arthropoda
- Class: Insecta
- Order: Lepidoptera
- Family: Crambidae
- Genus: Thliptoceras
- Species: T. caradjai

Binomial name
- Thliptoceras caradjai Munroe & Mutuura, 1968

Species of moth

Thliptoceras caradjai is a moth in the family Crambidae. It was described by Eugene G. Munroe and Akira Mutuura in 1968. It is found in China in Jiangsu, Zhejiang, Fujian, Jiangxi, Guangdong, Guangxi, Hainan and Guizhou.

The wingspan is about 20–22 mm. The ground colour of the wings is yellow.
