= Mount Ciremai National Park =

National park in Java, Indonesia

- Taman Nasional Gunung Ciremai
- IUCN category II (national park)
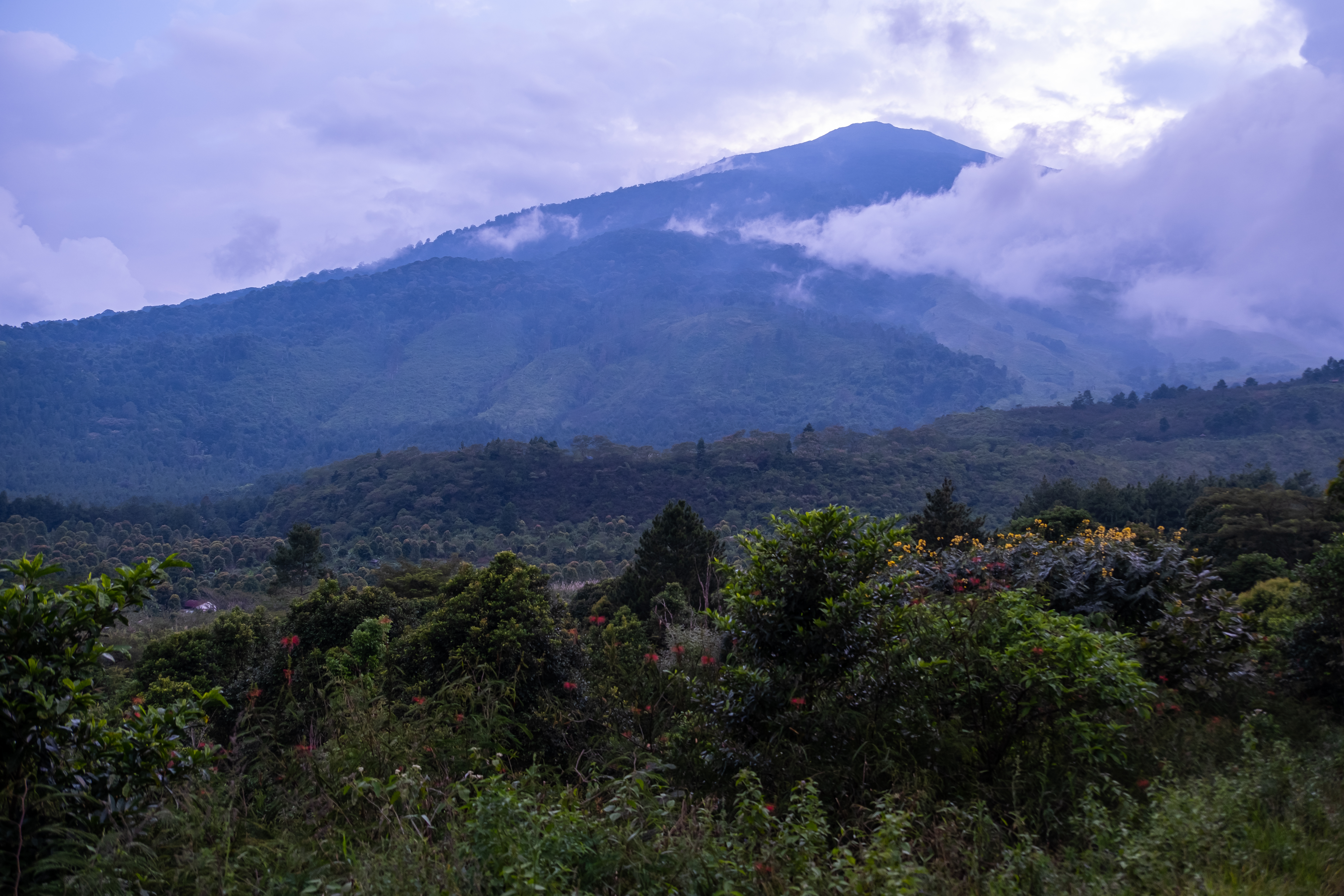
- Mount Ciremai NP, West Java

- Location within Java Location within Indonesia
- Location: West Java, Indonesia
- Nearest city: Kuningan; Majalengka; Cirebon
- Coordinates: 6.907167°S 108.415750°E
- Area: 155 km^{2} (60 sq mi)
- Established: 2004
- Visitors: 15,126 (in 2007)
- Governing body: Ministry of Environment and Forestry
- Website: tngciremai.menlhk.go.id

Mount Ciremai National Park is located around 50 km to the south of the city of Cirebon in West Java, Indonesia. The park extends into the Kuningan and Majalengka regencies south of Cirebon. The park surrounds Mount Ciremai, an active volcano, the highest peak in West Java. Groups of hikers, including parties of students, often climb the peak although care is needed. Various types of endemic or endangered flora and fauna are found in the park which include the following:

- Flora: pines (Pinus merkusii), Castanopsis javanica (known locally as saninten), randu tiang (Fragraera blumii), nangsi (Villubrunes rubescens), Macaranga denticulata, pasang (Lithocarpus sundaicus), Elaeocarpus stipularis, various species of fig trees (Ficus), Ardisia cymosa, and Platea latifolia,
- Fauna: leopards, deer (Muntiacus muntjak or Javan muntjac), monkeys (Javan surili), the Javan hawk-eagle and various species of python.

The Mount Ciremai National Park also serves as the headwaters of several river basins in the region, two of the largest among them are the Cimanuk River Basin and the Cisanggarung River Basin, both of which have all their main streams flowing into the Java Sea.

== See also ==
- Geography of Indonesia
