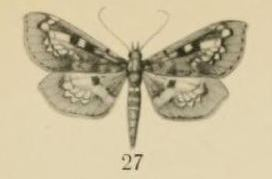

Scientific classification
- Domain: Eukaryota
- Kingdom: Animalia
- Phylum: Arthropoda
- Class: Insecta
- Order: Lepidoptera
- Family: Crambidae
- Genus: Thliptoceras
- Species: T. fenestratum

Binomial name
- Thliptoceras fenestratum Aurivillius, 1910

= Thliptoceras fenestratum =

Species of moth

Thliptoceras fenestratum is a moth in the family Crambidae. It was described by Per Olof Christopher Aurivillius in 1910. It is found in Tanzania.
