= Talaga =

Talaga is a surname. In Old Polish, it referred to a type of wagon. Notable people with the surname include:

- Tanya Talaga, Canadian journalist
- John Talaga, American musician
