= Tor laterivittatus =

Conservation status
- Data Deficient (IUCN 3.1)

Scientific classification
- Kingdom: Animalia
- Phylum: Chordata
- Class: Actinopterygii
- Order: Cypriniformes
- Family: Cyprinidae
- Genus: Tor
- Species: T. laterivittatus

Binomial name
- Tor laterivittatus W. Zhou & G. H. Cui, 1996

Species of fish

Tor laterivittatus is a species of cyprinid of the genus Tor. Described by Zhou and Cui in 1996, it inhabits the Mekong River basin in Laos and Yunnan, China. It is classified as "data deficient" on the IUCN Red List and has a maximum length among unsexed males of 60.0 centimetres (23.6 in).
