= Banchaung =

- Village
- Location in Burma
- Coordinates: 13°48′N 98°41′E
- Country: Burma
- Region: Taninthayi Region
- District: Dawei District
- Township: Dawei Township
- Elevation: 231 m (758 ft)
- Time zone: UTC+6.30 (MST)

Banchaung is a village of Dawei District in the Taninthayi Division of Myanmar.

== Geography ==
It is located by the Ban River on the western side of the Tenasserim Range near the border with Thailand.
