= Subang, Kuningan =

Subang
- District
- Location in Java Location in Indonesia
- Coordinates: 7.1282863999999995°S 108.5344435°E
- Country: Indonesia
- Province: West Java
- Regency: Kuningan Regency

Government
  - Head of district: Indra Bayu Permana

Area
  - Total: 44.95 km^{2} (17.36 sq mi)
- Highest elevation: 577 m (1,893 ft)
- Lowest elevation: 258 m (846 ft)

Population (mid 2024 estimate)
  - Total: 15,686
  - Density: 349.0/km^{2} (903.8/sq mi)
- Time zone: UTC+7 (Indonesia Western Time)
- Postal code: 45586
- Area code: (+62) 232
- Vehicle registration: E
- Website: kec-subang.kuningankab.go.id

Subang is an administrative district (kecamatan) in Kuningan Regency, West Java, Indonesia.

== Villages ==
Subang consists of 7 villages namely:

- Bangunjaya
- Gunungaci
- Jatisari
- Pamulihan
- Situgede
- Subang
- Tangkolo
