= Tor yingjiangensis =

Conservation status
- Data Deficient (IUCN 3.1)

Scientific classification
- Kingdom: Animalia
- Phylum: Chordata
- Class: Actinopterygii
- Order: Cypriniformes
- Family: Cyprinidae
- Genus: Tor
- Species: T. yingjiangensis

Binomial name
- Tor yingjiangensis Z. M. Chen & J. X. Yang, 2004

Species of fish

Tor yingjiangensis, the Yingjiang mahseer, is a species of cyprinid of the genus Tor. It inhabits China's Yunnan province. Considered harmless to humans, it has a maximum length of 18.1 cm (7.1 in). It is considered "data deficient" on the IUCN Red List.
