= Kuningan =

- District

Regional transcription(s)
  - Sundanese: ᮊᮥᮔᮤᮍᮔ᮪
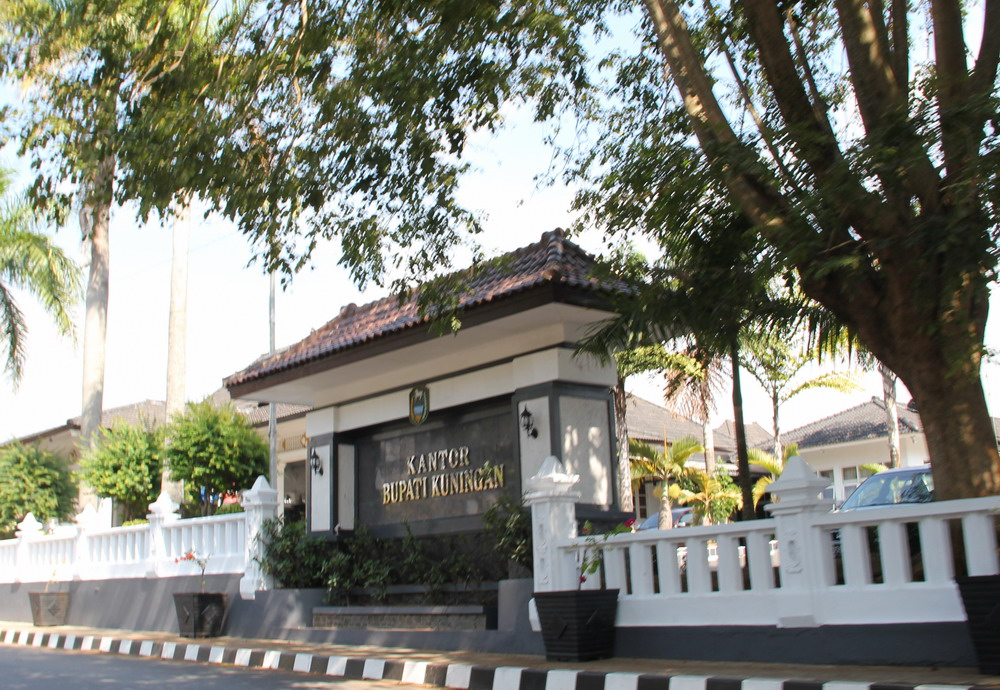
- Regent Office of Kuningan Regency
- Etymology: Suranggajaya, Duke of Kuningan
- Location in Java and Indonesia Kuningan (Indonesia)
- Coordinates: 6°58′35″S 108°29′4″E
- Country: Indonesia
- Province: West Java
- Regency: Kuningan Regency

Government
  - Camat: Saleh Rochiat
  - Secretary: Dudi Sudiana

Area
  - Total: 29.94 km^{2} (11.56 sq mi)
- Elevation: 534 m (1,752 ft)

Population (mid 2024 estimate)
  - Total: 116,862
  - Density: 3,903/km^{2} (10,110/sq mi)
- Time zone: UTC+7 (IWT)
- Postal code: 4551x, 45553
- Area code: (+62) 231
- Villages: 16
- Website: Official website

Kuningan (Sundanese: ᮊᮥᮔᮤᮍᮔ᮪) is a town (kelurahan) and an administrative district (kecamatan) located in eastern West Java, Indonesia, between Cirebon and Tasikmalaya, about 200 km east of Jakarta. It is the administrative center of Kuningan Regency. The district is located east of Mount Cereme/Ciremai (3.078 m), the highest mountain in West Java. The eastern part of the district is a valley. The district's landmark is a statue of a horse, called Kuda Kuningan and its motto is Kuningan Aman (Safe) Sehat (Healthy) Rindang (Leafy) Indah (Beautiful), abbreviated as Kuningan ASRI.

== Administrative divisions ==
Kuningan District is divided into 16 villages which are as follows:

- Ancaran
- Awirarangan
- Cibinuang
- Cigintung
- Cijoho
- Ciporang
- Cirendang
- Citangtu
- Karangtawang
- Kasturi
- Kedungarum
- Kuningan
- Padarek
- Purwawinangun
- Winduhaji
- Windusengkahan

== Climate ==
Kuningan has a tropical monsoon climate (Am) with moderate rainfall from June to September and heavy to very heavy rainfall from October to May.

Climate data for Kuningan
Month	Jan	Feb	Mar	Apr	May	Jun	Jul	Aug	Sep	Oct	Nov	Dec	Year
Mean daily maximum °C (°F)	28.4 (83.1)	28.5 (83.3)	28.8 (83.8)	29.0 (84.2)	29.2 (84.6)	28.9 (84.0)	28.5 (83.3)	28.9 (84.0)	29.6 (85.3)	30.0 (86.0)	29.3 (84.7)	28.9 (84.0)	29.0 (84.2)
Daily mean °C (°F)	24.3 (75.7)	24.3 (75.7)	24.5 (76.1)	24.6 (76.3)	24.8 (76.6)	24.2 (75.6)	23.8 (74.8)	23.9 (75.0)	24.4 (75.9)	25.0 (77.0)	24.7 (76.5)	24.6 (76.3)	24.4 (76.0)
Mean daily minimum °C (°F)	20.2 (68.4)	20.1 (68.2)	20.2 (68.4)	20.3 (68.5)	20.4 (68.7)	19.5 (67.1)	19.1 (66.4)	18.9 (66.0)	19.2 (66.6)	20.0 (68.0)	20.2 (68.4)	20.3 (68.5)	19.9 (67.8)
Average rainfall mm (inches)	462 (18.2)	392 (15.4)	443 (17.4)	278 (10.9)	218 (8.6)	109 (4.3)	80 (3.1)	52 (2.0)	58 (2.3)	133 (5.2)	267 (10.5)	382 (15.0)	2,874 (112.9)
Source: Climate-Data.org
