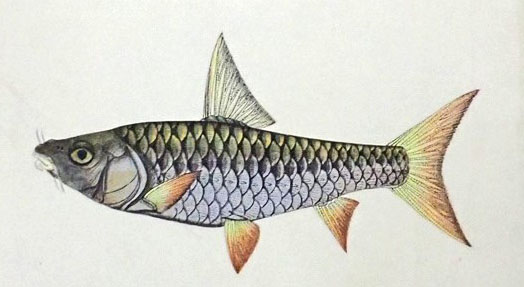
- Original illustration of Tor tor by Haludar 1822

Conservation status
- Data Deficient (IUCN 3.1)

Scientific classification
- Kingdom: Animalia
- Phylum: Chordata
- Class: Actinopterygii
- Order: Cypriniformes
- Family: Cyprinidae
- Genus: Tor
- Species: T. tor

Binomial name
- Tor tor (Hamilton, 1822)

Synonyms
- Cyprinus tor Hamilton, 1822; Barbus tor (Hamilton, 1822); Puntius tor (Hamilton, 1822); Tor hamiltonii Gray, 1834; Tor hamiltoni Gray, 1834; Barbus megalepis McClelland, 1839; Tor mosal mahanadicus David, 1953

= Tor tor =

Tor mahseer

Species of fish

Tor tor, commonly known as the tor mahseer, tor barb, or red-finned mahseer, is a species of cyprinid fish found in fast-flowing rivers and streams with rocky bottoms in India, Bangladesh, Bhutan, Nepal, and Pakistan. It is a commercially important food and game fish.

In the Himalayan rivers, the population is rapidly declining through its native range, including some evidence of catastrophic population collapse, due to pollution, overfishing, the effects of dam building, climate change and introductions of other mahseer species. Until the 1980s, Tor tor was the most populous of the Himalayan mahseers in those rivers where robust species diversity monitoring had taken place. In 2011, the Madhya Pradesh government declared Tor tor as the official state fish of the state.

There are also declining populations in rivers of Central India, including north-flowing tributaries of the Ganges/Yamuna basin, the Narmada basin and as far south as the Savitri River in Maharashtra. Given the huge differences in climatic and riverine conditions, careful work on species identity is needed to establish if these mahseer are also Tor tor, or an undescribed species.

== Description ==
Tor tor is a large fish, reaching 36 cm (14 in) at maturity, but lengths of 150 cm (4.9 ft) have been recorded, but the maximum length is 200 cm. The fish is well armoured by their record large scales, each reaching up to 10 cm (3.9 in) in length.

== Habitats ==
A close look at the giant red-finned mahseer of Himalayan rivers suggests it is adapted to feeding on the bottom. Having a sub-terminal or inferior mouth and being equipped with barbels, small sensory organs dangling from the corners of the mouth, usually imply that this fish feeds on or in the river's substrate. This could be an explanation for how multiple species of mahseer inhabit the same river habitats.

Another element that requires more study is that the co-habiting species Tor putitora accesses tributaries at higher elevations than Tor tor for spawning success. These papers show that while some research has been conducted into the breeding habits of the golden mahseer, little work has been done on Tor tor, possibly because of the alarming decline in populations.

== Conservation ==
Among the most pressing issues relating to the conservation of this fish are that it cannot be correctly identified. Although many papers have been published on Tor tor, most are written about studies of fish from the Narmada River of central India, none cross-reference to fish from the type locality: Mahananda River of West Bengal. The uncertainty of identity is the reason for the IUCN Red Listing status of Data Deficient.

While there are reports of a few, large fish which appear to fit the description of Tor tor in some rivers of the Himalayan region, anecdotal reports from anglers suggest that there are very few juvenile fish. This may demonstrate that spawning behaviours have been changed, due to a number of possible factors, but dam building is one of the most likely culprits. The planned Pancheswar Dam on the Sarda River (also called Mahakali River when shared by Nepal) will halt the migration of all freshwater fauna, including mature Tor tor. Climate change is likely to have a devastating effect on fish species of the Himalayas, due to a combination of increased flows from glacial melt and rising temperatures due to both a generally warmer local climate and the effect of impoundments.

Releases of non-native fish are also having an impact upon fish of Himalaya, like Tor tor. Given the high incidence of Buddhist belief in the region, many of these are inadvertent 'liberation' of highly invasive species, both fish and other organisms like turtles and frogs.
Calls for stock reinforcement through stocking are understandable, but have often caused more problems for wild stock. A correct and long-term study of relative species populations will be needed prior to any attempt to recover stocks through artificial breeding.
As has been demonstrated previously, attempts to restock without an adequate understanding of species ratios, or by using incorrect species, can have catastrophic effects upon the target species for a conservation plan.
