= Tor polylepis =

Conservation status
- Data Deficient (IUCN 3.1)

Scientific classification
- Kingdom: Animalia
- Phylum: Chordata
- Class: Actinopterygii
- Order: Cypriniformes
- Family: Cyprinidae
- Genus: Tor
- Species: T. polylepis

Binomial name
- Tor polylepis W. Zhou & G. H. Cui, 1996

Species of fish

Tor polylepis is a species of cyprinid of the genus Tor. It inhabits China's Yunnan province. Its maximum length is 5.3 centimetres (2.1 in). It is considered harmless to humans, and has been assessed as "data deficient" on the IUCN Red List.
