= Thliptoceras sinensis =

Scientific classification
- Domain: Eukaryota
- Kingdom: Animalia
- Phylum: Arthropoda
- Class: Insecta
- Order: Lepidoptera
- Family: Crambidae
- Genus: Thliptoceras
- Species: T. sinensis

Binomial name
- Thliptoceras sinensis (Caradja, 1925)

Synonyms
- Phlyctaenodes decoloralis sinense Caradja, 1925

Species of moth

Thliptoceras sinensis is a moth in the family Crambidae. It was described by Aristide Caradja in 1925. It is found in China in Shanghai, Zhejiang, Fujian, Jiangxi, Guangdong, Guangxi, Hainan and Guizhou.

The wingspan is 24–27 mm.
