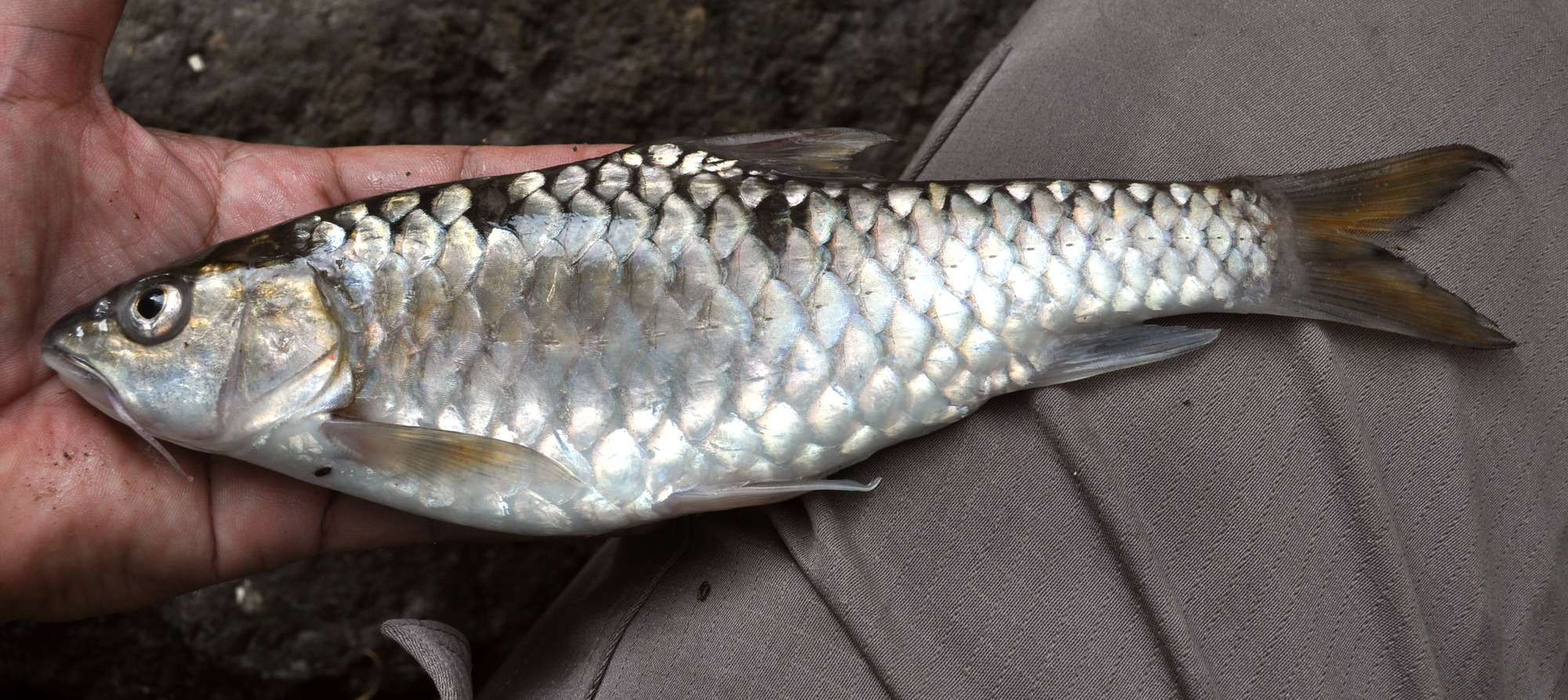

Scientific classification
- Kingdom: Animalia
- Phylum: Chordata
- Class: Actinopterygii
- Division: Teleostei
- Order: Cypriniformes
- Family: Cyprinidae
- Genus: Tor
- Species: T. douronensis

Binomial name
- Tor douronensis (Valenciennes, 1842)

= Tor douronensis =

Species of fish

Tor douronensis, also known as Labeobarbus douronensis, is a species of ray-finned fish of the family Cyprinidae in the genus Tor. This Asian fresh water river carp can be discovered in southern Thailand, east to Vietnam and south to Indonesia. The species is known from the Chao Phraya and Mekong rivers.
This fish has been attributed to Valenciennes however, in his original notes, he claims that the fish he described "formed part of the collection made in Java by Kuhl and Van Hesselt; they named it Dourr." Certainly, the type locality is Java, in Indonesia and the holotype is lodged at Bogor Zoology Museum.

== Validity ==
In recent years it has been suggested that Tor douronensis is synonymous with Tor tambra, following the work of Tyson R. Roberts in 1999. Since then, in 2017, Ng Chee Kiat et al. have published a paper on the fish diversity of Sabah state in Malaysian Borneo. They reference the work of Roberts and more recent work by Maurice Kottelat to conclude that Tor tambra is the only currently valid species of mahseer in the rivers of Indonesia and Malaysia.

== Taxonomic and genetic issues ==
Along with many mahseer species in other parts of the region, there is much confusion around the taxonomic and genetic differences between species. Tor douronensis as described from Java has a body length 4.5 times the maximum body height, a short head measuring 1/5 of the body length and 21 lateral line scales. In most places where the locals understand their fish to be Tor douronensis, the fish displays a shorter head and deeper body than Tor tambra. These fish also appear to have unusually long barbels compared to other mahseer in the area.
There are studies that have looked at the genetics of the Indonesian mahseers (Tor tambra, Tor tambroides and Tor douronensis) but with the exception of Walton's study of Tor tambra none of the known studies have made comparisons with specimens collected from the type locality. Therefore, the specimens studied cannot be validated as the species named. The only way that the validity of Tor douronensis can be moved forward is by a concerted study in the river basin of the type locality.

== Localities ==
In Indonesia this fish is locally known as ikan semah, kancra bodas, or ikan dewa (god's fish). It is rarely found in rivers and ponds in Indonesia, especially in Java, Sumatera and Borneo. Because of its rarity, the Sundanese people consider it as a sacred fish. It can be found in rivers and ponds around Mount Cereme, West Java, such as Cibulan, Cigugur, Pasawahan, Linggajati, dan Darmaloka sacred ponds. Because of its rarity in Indonesia, the Indonesian Institute of Sciences considering to propose to CITES to give it the status as protected endangered species.

In Thailand, this fish is known as pla pluang chomphu or pla vien chomphu (Thai: ปลาพลวงชมพู, ปลาเวียนชมพู; lit: pink mahseer, pink brook carp) by the colour of the scales and fins are light red or pink. In 1981, this species was in an endangered status. Due to the habitat was destroyed from the Bang Lang Dam, the new dam was built. Subsequently, specimens were collected from nature for breeding. Which was successful, but it also yields less. In the year of 1999, Queen Sirikit proceeded to the Bang Lang Dam and released the fish back to nature. Later, she had the initiative to find fish to farm on the Royal Project. It can be grown in large quantities nowadays by Yala Inland Fisheries Station under Department of Fisheries. Presently, this fish has a very expensive price. They sell at 2,000 baht (about US$60) per kg. and in Hong Kong at 8,000 baht per kg. (US$242).

== See also ==
- Rajang River
