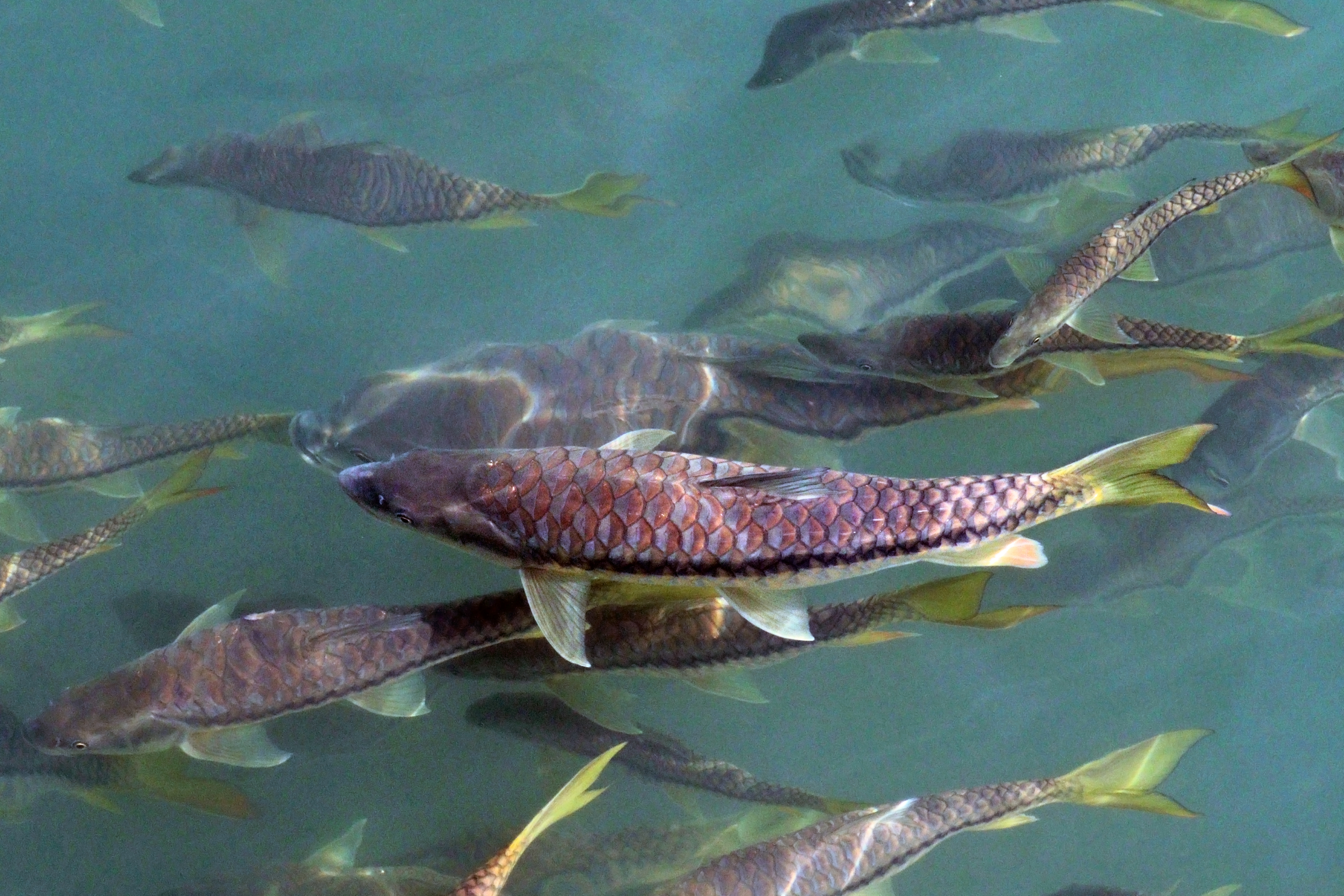
- Babai River, Nepal
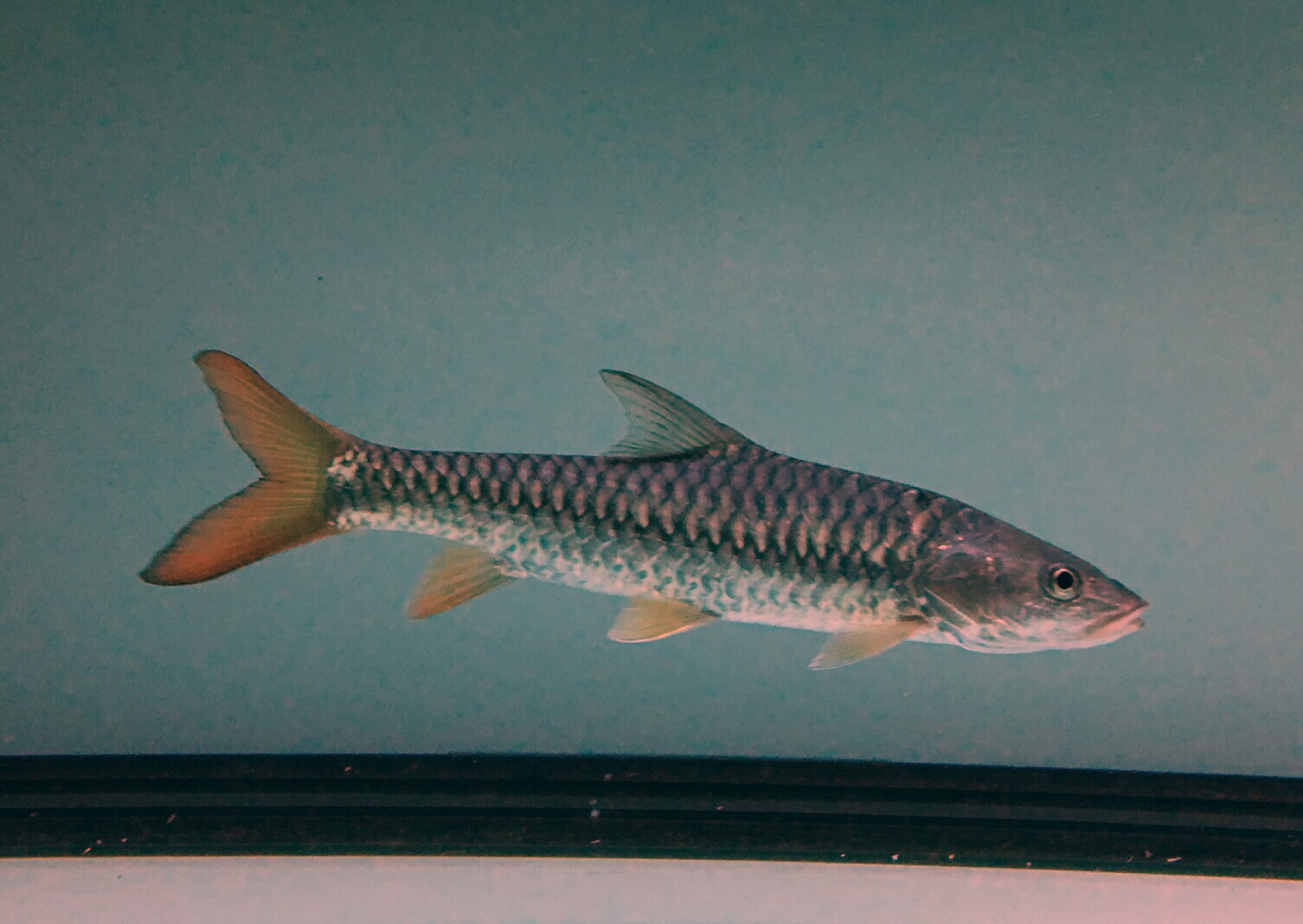
- Juvenile, about 35 cm (14 in) long

Conservation status
- Endangered (IUCN 3.1)

Scientific classification
- Kingdom: Animalia
- Phylum: Chordata
- Class: Actinopterygii
- Division: Teleostei
- Order: Cypriniformes
- Family: Cyprinidae
- Genus: Tor
- Species: T. putitora

Binomial name
- Tor putitora (F. Hamilton, 1822)

Synonyms
- List: Cyprinus putitora Hamilton, 1822; Barbus putitora (Hamilton, 1822); Puntius putitora (Hamilton, 1822); Cyprinus mosal Hamilton, 1822; Tor mosal (Hamilton, 1822); Barbus mosal (Hamilton, 1822); Labeobarbus macrolepis Heckel, 1838; Tor macrolepis (Heckel, 1838); Barbus macrocephalus McClelland, 1839; Barbus progeneius McClelland, 1839; Tor progeneius (McClelland, 1839)

= Tor putitora =

Species of fish

Tor putitora, known as the golden mahseer, putitor mahseer, or Himalayan mahseer, is an endangered species of cyprinid fish that is found in rapid streams, riverine pools, and lakes in the Himalayan region. Its native range is within the basins of the Indus, Ganges and Brahmaputra rivers.

== Description ==
Francis Buchanan-Hamilton's original description of Cyprinus putitora says "The head is blunt, oval, small, and smooth". He goes on to say "The mouth is small" and "the lateral line is scarcely distinguishable". However, the largest head of any mahseer species, with a large mouth and prominent lateral line stripe, is a feature considered to be important in the correct identification of this species. Their scales are so large that playing cards were made from them in Dacca, as reported by Hamilton in his description.

Tor putitora were previously distinguished by determining head length (which is purportedly greater than body depth in the species), but analysis of T. putitora populations throughout India has determined that this method is hampered by the phenotypic plasticity of the species; this metric should not be relied upon as individuals may have head lengths less than, equal to, or greater than body depth. This variation led to the naming of Tor macrolepis, now known to be a junior synonym of T. putitora inhabiting the Indus River.

Its caudal, pelvic, and anal fins show a reddish-golden tint. While the body above its lateral line is generally golden in colour at adulthood, the gold colour might be absent in young specimens.

This omnivorous species is generally found near the surface in water that ranges from 13–30 °C (55–86 °F). It is a popular gamefish, once believed to be the largest species of mahseer, and can reach up to 2.75 m (9.0 ft) in length and 54 kg (119 lb) in weight, though most caught today are far smaller.

== Habitat ==
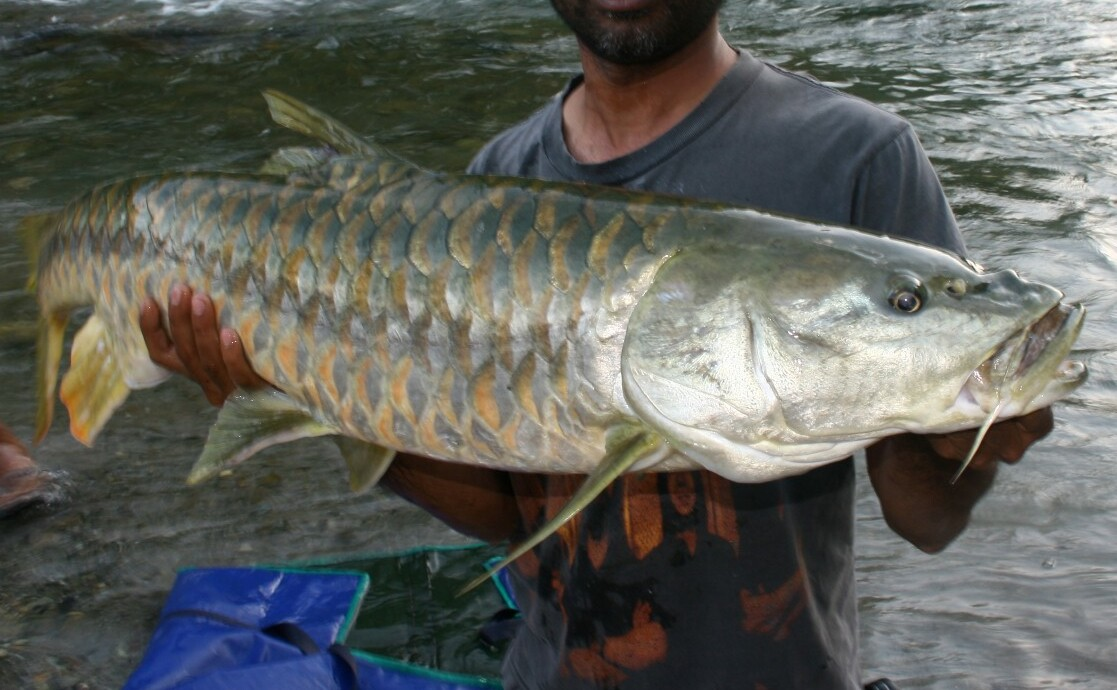
Caught in India

The golden mahseer is naturally found in montane and submontane regions within streams and rivers across the Himalayan region. Its habitat includes high-energy river systems with rocky substrates, and the species has shown adaptability to lacustrine environments formed by dam impoundments. Additionally, introduced populations have established in lakes where suitable habitats for reproduction are created by ephemeral stream inputs. The species' ability to thrive in varied environmental conditions underscores the importance of preserving both natural river ecosystems and artificial reservoirs for the sustainable conservation of this fish species in the South Himalayan region. It was reported to be found in the Salween River, the natural border between Thailand and Myanmar, but observations of it have been very rare, having only been observed three times in 28 years.

=== As an introduced species ===
Recent releases of artificially bred stock have been into the Irrawaddy River basin in Nagaland, India and, through the Indo-German Biodiversity Programme, releases into the Hira Bambai reservoir and small streams around Melghat Tiger Reserve, part of the Tapti River basin. The effect of releasing fish from a different river basin, well outside its native range, is uncertain. That these fish are being released over a ten-year period, with as many as 10,000 in each batch, must be considered a huge threat to the native mahseer and other fish species. According to Ogale, former scientist leading the fish breeding programme for Tata Power: "When these mature, there will be more fingerlings which will be then introduced in river Tapi". River Tapi is a west-flowing river of the central Indian state of Maharashtra. Golden mahseer from Lonavala hatchery in Maharashtra, India were supplied to the government of Papua New Guinea where the fish escaped into the local Sepik river system after release into the Yonki reservoir. There are fears about the decline of native species following these introductions.

== Relation to humans ==
It is threatened by habitat loss, habitat degradation and overfishing, and it has already declined by more than an estimated 50%. The prospect of large-scale dam building across the distribution range gives cause for concern reflected by the current Red Listing status.

Most researchers believe this fish is in a population decline, hence the Red Listing status of Endangered. Some, however, have noted that Tor putitora is "quite abundant", which also raises questions about the status of ongoing stock augmentation programmes.

The primary threat to Tor putitora is habitat loss and degradation, driven predominantly by the extensive development of hydropower projects in the Himalayan range. This anthropogenic impact poses a substantial risk to the species, as it results in the deterioration and reduction of essential habitats.

Overfishing exacerbates the challenges faced by Tor putitora, with unsustainable practices such as dynamiting, poisoning, and the use of fine-meshed nets contributing to a decline in populations. The impact of overfishing is notable in various river systems, affecting the species' overall population dynamics.

The species may also face increased competition due to widespread introduction of non-native species in the trans-Himalayan region, such as trout (Salmo spp. and Oncorhynchus mykiss) and common carp (Cyprinus carpio). Conversely, golden mahseer are themselves stocked into waterways where they aren't native, which may threaten other species and lead to "genetic simplification" (genetic erosion); intentional stocking of mahseers have been taking place for several years. It has been reported that the Teesta River in Sikkim and West Bengal has been stocked with hundreds of thousands of golden mahseer every year since at least 2014 in a drive to promote angling in the region. That the fish stocks continue to decline suggests that the policy needs to be reviewed and more efforts devoted to improving habitat as the first priority.

Rudyard Kipling, who won the Nobel Prize for Literature, wrote: "There he met the mahseer of the Poonch, beside whom the tarpon is a herring, and he who catches him can say he is a fisherman." (Rudyard Kipling - "The Day's Work" 1898 - "The Brushwood Boy" 1899).

The golden mahaseer is the National fish of Pakistan. (Note: "The Official National fish of Pakistan" respectively) It is also the state fish of the Indian states and union territories of Arunachal Pradesh, Himachal Pradesh, Jammu and Kashmir, Odisha and Uttarakhand.
