= Mount Ciremai =

Stratovolcano in West Java, Indonesia

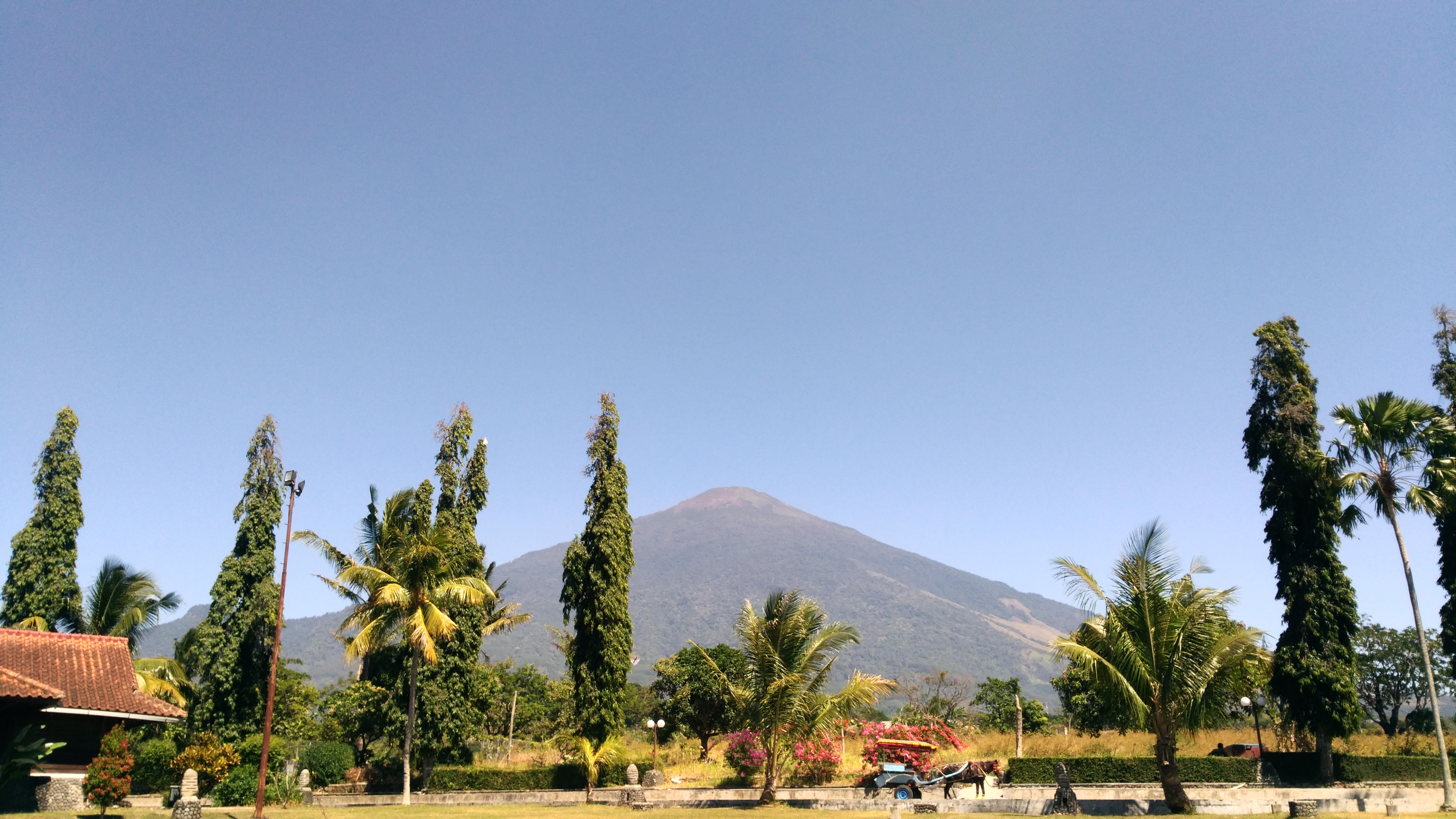
- Mt. Ciremai from Kuningan

Highest point
- Elevation: 3,078 m (10,098 ft)
- Prominence: 2,792 m (9,160 ft)
- Listing: Ultra; Ribu
- Coordinates: 6.892°S 108.40°E

Geography
- Location within Java
- Location: West Java, Indonesia

Geology
- Mountain type: Stratovolcano
- Volcanic arc: Sunda Arc
- Last eruption: March 1951

Climbing
- Easiest route: Palutungan
- Normal route: Apuy; Linggarjati; Linggasana

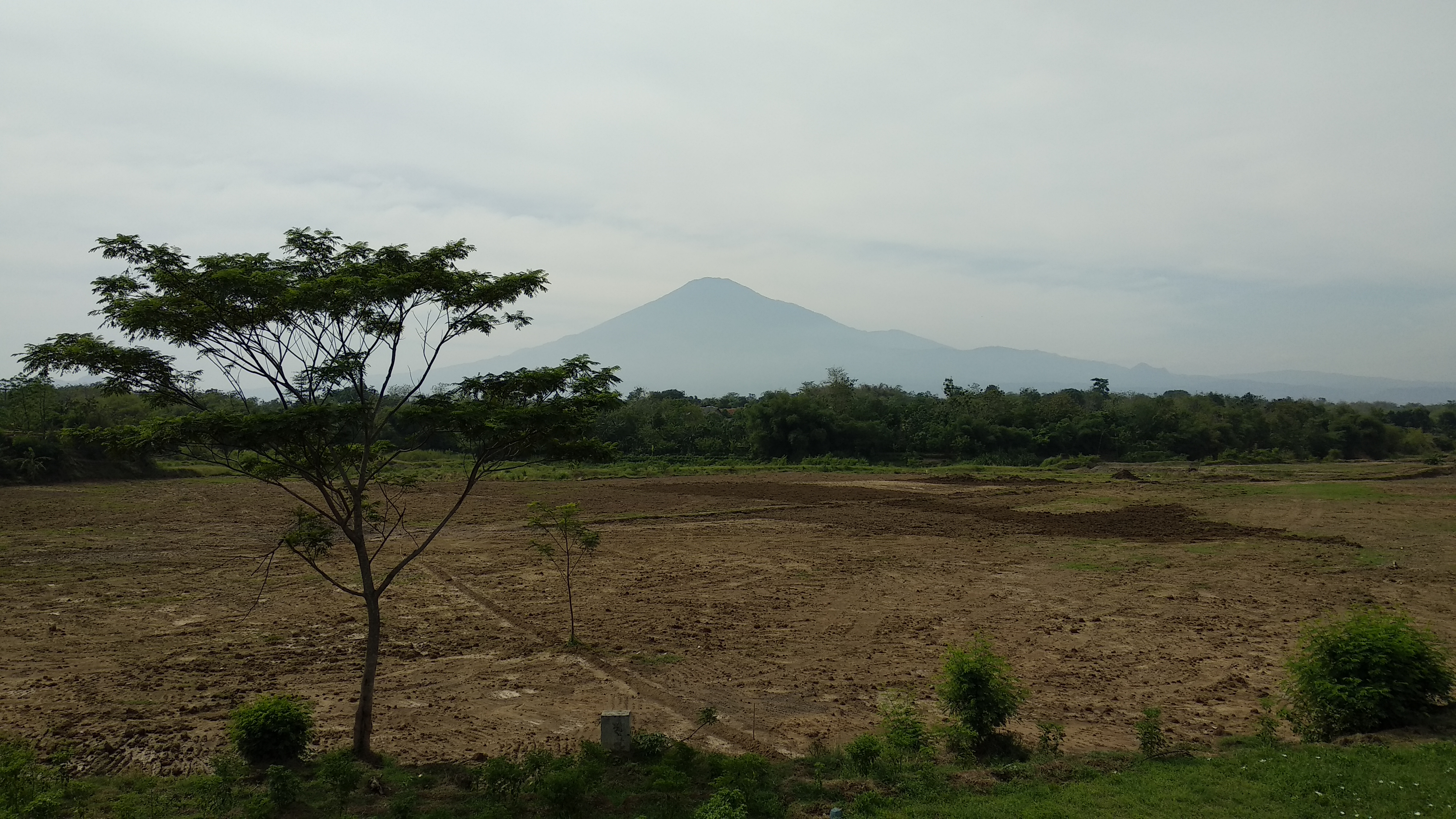
Mount view from Jatiwangi District of Majalengka Regency, West Java

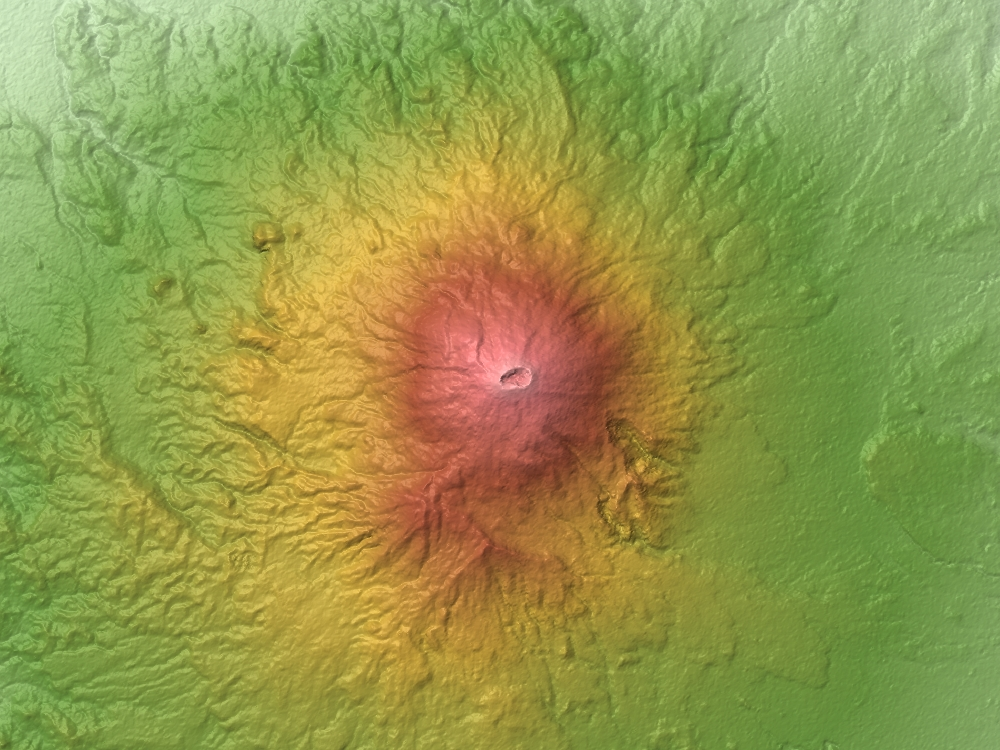
Relief Map

Mount Ciremai (also spelled Cereme or Ciremay) is a dominating symmetrical stratovolcano in West Java, Indonesia. It is located to the southwest of the major town of Cirebon. Mt Ciremai is strikingly visible towards the south from the main west–east corridor (Jakarta-Surabaya) rail link along the north coast of Java. It is the highest point in West Java.

== Geography ==
At the summit of Mt Ciremai, there is a 0.5 km wide crater. Eruptions are relatively infrequent in historical time but explosive activity and lahars from the summit have been recorded. Mount Ceremai is especially significant because it is the highest mountain in the province of West Java. The name "Cereme" or "Ciremai" is derived from the Sundanese word for Otaheite gooseberry.

On Mt Ciremai, as on many other mountains up and down Java, there has been serious deforestation in recent decades. It was reported in late 2012 that forest destruction on Mt Ciremai had reached 4,000 ha out of a total of 15,000 ha. Causes are said to include illegal logging, sand quarrying (often for construction purposes in nearby areas), and forest fires. Some of the consequences of deforestation of this kind, evident in the Cirebon area close to the sea near Mt Ciremai, include extensive siltation of the rivers that flow northwards into the Java Sea and more frequent flooding in lowland areas.

Numbers of small streams have their source on the slopes of Mt Ciremai. Most of them went northwest towards Majalengka to join the large Manuk River in the northwest that drains to the Java Sea near Indramayu. On the southeastern side, the Waduk Darma serves as the reservoir near the stream that drains eastward as the Cisanggarung River which later curved and headed north to mark the boundary between West Java and Central Java.

== Tourism and recreation ==
There are numerous recreational and tourist sites on the slopes of Mt Ciremai. Various sites, including parks and cafes, attract crowds of visitors from Cirebon. The museum at Linggajati on the slopes of Mt Ciremai which records the important historical event of the Linggadjati Agreement during the struggle for Indonesian Independence in 1946 attracts many visitors during weekends. The Mt Ciremai National Park extends for a considerable distance around the slopes of the mountain.

The eastern slope of Mt Ciremai has several interesting places, popular among tourists and visitors. Near the town of Cilimus (between Cirebon and Kuningan city), there is a natural volcanic hot springs of Sangkanhurip. It is a popular tourist spot for spas and relaxation among people of Cirebon and Kuningan. The clear spring water and ponds of Cigugur and Cibulan are a natural water swimming pool that is also the sanctuary of rare Kancra bodas fish, which are considered sacred fish among locals. Forest sanctuary can be found on the slopes around the summit, however, the popular forest sanctuary is in Linggajati, on the eastern slopes. On the Southeastern slopes near the city of Kuningan, there is the Cipari megalithic site which is an important archaeological site of the Indonesian prehistoric period.

Groups of hikers, including parties of students, regularly climb the peak. This often takes 12 hours or more for the round trip, and involves camping on the mountain for a night for some groups. As is frequently the case in other parts of Indonesia, groups are expected to register with local officials before beginning the climb. Care is needed because inexperienced hikers sometimes run into considerable difficulties. Groups often begin the climb from Linggajati in the east, Palutungan from the south near the town of Cigugur, or Majalengka to the west.

== See also ==
- Gunung Ciremai National Park
- List of ultras of the Malay Archipelago
- List of volcanoes in Indonesia
