= 2023 Liga 3 West Java Series 2 =

Liga 3 West Java Series 2
- Season: 2023–24
- Dates: 28 October – 22 November 2023
- Champions: Perkesit
- Promoted: Perkesit; Cimahi United; ASAD Purwakarta; Persindra; Persikabumi; Mandala
- Matches: 83
- Goals: 386 (4.65 per match)
- Biggest home win: Perssi 15–1 Bandung Timur (7 November 2023)
- Biggest away win: PSIT 1–9 Perkesit (31 October 2023)
- Highest scoring: Perssi 15–1 Bandung Timur (7 November 2023)
- Longest winning run: Cimahi United (5 matches)
- Longest losing run: Bara Siliwangi (5 matches)

The 2023 Liga 3 West Java Series 2 is eight season of Liga 3 West Java Series 2 as second division of Liga 3 West Java.

There are 42 teams participating in this season.

== Teams ==
=== Changes from last season ===
▲ Promoted to Series 1	▼ Relegated from Series 1	New teams
Al Jabbar; PSGJ; Persima; Pesik	Persindra; Depok United; Roksi	ASAD Purwakarta; Bojong Gede Raya; Cimahi United; Fanshop FA; Gemilang Raya; PISA; PLG Parahyangan; RCK Nusantara; Riverside Forest; Wisdom

=== Participating teams ===
No	Team	Location
1	Bandung Legend	Bandung City and Bandung Regency
2	Bandung Timur	Bandung City and Bandung Regency
3	Bara Siliwangi	Bandung City and Bandung Regency
4	Fanshop FA	Bandung City and Bandung Regency
5	Inspire	Bandung City and Bandung Regency
6	Maung Anom	Bandung City and Bandung Regency
7	Maung Bandung	Bandung City and Bandung Regency
8	POR UNI	Bandung City and Bandung Regency
9	R2B Legend	Bandung City and Bandung Regency
10	Rancaekek	Bandung City and Bandung Regency
11	Riverside Forest	Bandung City and Bandung Regency
12	Saint Prima	Bandung City and Bandung Regency
13	Super Progresif	Bandung City and Bandung Regency
14	WBFC	Bandung City and Bandung Regency
15	Young Tigers	Bandung City and Bandung Regency
16	Cimahi United	Cimahi City
17	Bojong Gede Raya	Bogor City and Bogor Regency
18	Cibinong Poetra	Bogor City and Bogor Regency
19	Gapura	Bogor City and Bogor Regency
20	Pakuan City	Bogor City and Bogor Regency
21	Satria Sanggeni	Bogor City and Bogor Regency
22	Bekasi United	Bekasi City and Bekasi Regency
23	Buaran Putra	Bekasi City and Bekasi Regency
24	PS Amdesta	Bekasi City and Bekasi Regency

No	Team	Location
25	Bina Putra	Cirebon City and Cirebon Regency
26	PISA	Cirebon City and Cirebon Regency
27	PSIT	Cirebon City and Cirebon Regency
28	Persikabumi	Sukabumi City and Sukabumi Regency
29	Perssi	Sukabumi City and Sukabumi Regency
30	Sukabumi	Sukabumi City and Sukabumi Regency
31	Perkesit	Cianjur Regency
32	RCK Nusantara	Cianjur Regency
33	Benpica	Karawang Regency
34	Persika	Karawang Regency
35	Galuh	Ciamis Regency
36	Persikad 1999	Depok City
37	Persindra	Indramayu Regency
38	Gemilang Raya	Kuningan Regency
39	Mandala	Majalengka Regency
40	ASAD Purwakarta	Purwakarta Regency
41	BRT Subang	Subang Regency
42	Tasik Raya	Tasikmalaya City

== First round ==
=== Group A ===
All matches were held at Lapangan Progresif, Bandung

Pos	Team	Pld	W	D	L	GF	GA	GD	Pts	Qualification	CMU	PBI	STE	SPI	BPU	BSL
1	Cimahi United (P)	5	5	0	0	21	6	+15	15	Qualified to Second round	—	3–1	2–1	3–2	5–2	8–0
2	Persikabumi	5	4	0	1	20	5	+15	12	Qualified to Second round	—	—	4–0	—	—	—
3	Satria Sanggeni	5	3	0	2	8	7	+1	9		—	—	—	—	2–0	2–1
4	Super Progresif	5	2	0	3	8	10	−2	6		—	2–3	0–3	—	—	—
5	Bina Putra	5	1	0	4	5	15	−10	3		—	0–6	—	1–2	—	2–0
6	Bara Siliwangi	5	0	0	5	1	20	−19	0		—	0–6	—	0–2	—	—

Source: Liga 3 West Java Series 2
Legend: Blue = home team win; Yellow = draw; Red = away team win.
(P) Promoted

=== Group B ===
All matches were held at Tri Parung Jaya Stadium, Sindanglaya

Pos	Team	Pld	W	D	L	GF	GA	GD	Pts	Qualification	BRT	BRN	RIV	BOJ	GPR
1	BRT Subang	4	3	1	0	16	6	+10	10	Qualified to Second round	—	2–2	—	3–1	—
2	Buaran Putra	4	3	1	0	12	4	+8	10	Qualified to Second round	—	—	3–1	—	—
3	Riverside Forest	4	2	0	2	12	8	+4	6		2–3	—	—	—	—
4	Bojong Gede Raya	4	0	1	3	6	11	−5	1		—	1–2	2–4	—	2–2
5	Gapura	4	0	1	3	3	20	−17	1		1–8	0–5	0–5	—	—

Source: Liga 3 West Java Series 2
Legend: Blue = home team win; Yellow = draw; Red = away team win.

=== Group C ===
All matches were held at Lapangan YON ARMED 9, Sadang

Pos	Team	Pld	W	D	L	GF	GA	GD	Pts	Qualification	PNC	WBF	PKR	BKU	MNN
1	Pakuan CIty	4	3	1	0	12	3	+9	10	Qualified to Second round	—	2–0	—	—	4–2
2	WBFC	4	3	0	1	5	2	+3	9	Qualified to Second round	—	—	3–0	1–0	—
3	Persika	4	1	2	1	3	5	−2	5		1–1	—	—	1–0	—
4	Bekasi United	4	1	0	3	2	8	−6	3		0–5	—	—	—	2–1
5	Maung Anom	4	0	1	3	4	8	−4	1		—	0–1	1–1	—	—

Source: Liga 3 West Java Series 2
Legend: Blue = home team win; Yellow = draw; Red = away team win.

=== Group D ===
All matches were held at Lapangan Lodaya, Bandung

Pos	Team	Pld	W	D	L	GF	GA	GD	Pts	Qualification	PSB	FFA	INP	BDT	BDL
1	Perssi	4	4	0	0	31	6	+25	12	Qualified to Second round	—			15–1	
2	Fanshop FA	4	2	1	1	30	9	+21	7	Qualified to Second round	1–4	—	4–4	11–0	14–1
3	Inspire	4	1	2	1	12	12	0	5		4–5		—		2–2
4	Bandung Timur	4	1	0	3	6	28	−22	3				1–2	—	
5	Bandung Legend	4	0	1	3	3	27	−24	1		0–7			0–4	—

Source: Liga 3 West Java Series 2
Legend: Blue = home team win; Yellow = draw; Red = away team win.

=== Group E ===
All matches were held at Lapangan YON ARMED, Sadang

Pos	Team	Pld	W	D	L	GF	GA	GD	Pts	Qualification	APW	GML	MBD	CPE	BPC
1	ASAD Purwakarta (P)	4	4	0	0	10	3	+7	12	Qualified to Second round	—	—	—	4–1	—
2	Gemilang Raya	4	2	0	2	10	7	+3	6	Qualified to Second round	1–2	—	—	—	2–3
3	Maung Bandung	4	1	1	2	6	7	−1	4		1–2	1–4	—	1–1	3–0
4	Cibinong Poetra	4	1	1	2	6	8	−2	4		—	1–3	—	—	3–0
5	Benpica	4	1	0	3	3	10	−7	3		0–2	—	—	—	—

Source: Liga 3 West Java Series 2
Legend: Blue = home team win; Yellow = draw; Red = away team win.
(P) Promoted

=== Group F ===
All matches were held at Tri Parung Jaya Stadium, Sindanglaya

Pos	Team	Pld	W	D	L	GF	GA	GD	Pts	Qualification	PCJ	PDE	R2B	YTG	PTC
1	Perkesit (C, P)	4	4	0	0	21	3	+18	12	Qualified to Second round	—	2–0	7–1	—	—
2	PS Amdesta	4	3	0	1	17	6	+11	9	Qualified to Second round	—	—	—	11–2	4–1
3	R2B Legend	4	2	0	2	7	11	−4	6		—	1–2	—	3–1	—
4	Young Tigers	4	1	0	3	6	18	−12	3		1–3	—	—	—	2–1
5	PSIT	4	0	0	4	4	17	−13	0		1–9	—	1–2	—	—

Source: Liga 3 West Java Series 2
Legend: Blue = home team win; Yellow = draw; Red = away team win.
(C) Champions; (P) Promoted

=== Group G ===
All matches were held at Lapangan UNI, Bandung

Pos	Team	Pld	W	D	L	GF	GA	GD	Pts	Qualification	IND	RCK	DPK	POR	SUK
1	Persindra (P)	4	4	0	0	16	3	+13	12	Qualified to Second round	—	4–0	3–1	5–1	4–1
2	RCK Nusantara	4	3	0	1	11	4	+7	9	Qualified to Second round		—	3–0		4–0
3	Persikad 1999	4	2	0	2	13	9	+4	6				—	4–3	
4	POR UNI	4	0	1	3	5	14	−9	1			0–4		—	
5	Sukabumi	4	0	1	3	2	17	−15	1				0–8	1–1	—

Source: Liga 3 West Java Series 2
Legend: Blue = home team win; Yellow = draw; Red = away team win.
(P) Promoted

=== Group H ===
All matches were held at Lapangan Lodaya, Bandung

Pos	Team	Pld	W	D	L	GF	GA	GD	Pts	Qualification	MFJ	TSR	RNC	PSC	SPM	GLH
1	Mandala	5	4	1	0	25	5	+20	13	Qualified to Second round	—	1–1				11–1
2	Tasik Raya	5	3	2	0	12	8	+4	11	Qualified to Second round		—		5–3	2–1	
3	Rancaekek	5	3	1	1	18	10	+8	10		1–5	2–2	—	4–2	3–0	8–1
4	PISA	5	1	1	3	13	15	−2	4		1–2			—	1–1	
5	Saint Prima	5	0	2	3	6	15	−9	2		1–6				—	
6	Galuh	5	0	1	4	9	30	−21	1			1–2		3–6	3–3	—

Source: Liga 3 West Java Series 2
Legend: Blue = home team win; Yellow = draw; Red = away team win.

== Second round ==
=== Bracket ===
Round of 16
13 November 2023 – Bandung City
A1	Cimahi United	5
C2	WBFC	1
14 November 2023 – Bandung City
H1	Mandala	2
F2	PS Amdesta	1
13 November 2023 – Bandung City
E1	ASAD Purwakarta	6
G2	RCK Nusantara	3
14 November 2023 – Bandung City
D1	Perssi	10
B2	Buaran Putra	0
13 November 2023 – Bandung City
B1	BRT Subang	1
D2	Fanshop FA	0
14 November 2023 – Bandung City
G1	Persindra	8
E2	Gemilang Raya	0
13 November 2023 – Bandung City
F1	Perkesit	5
H2	Tasik Raya	0
14 November 2023 – Bandung City
C1	Pakuan City	1
A2	Persikabumi	5

Quarter-finals
16 November 2023 – Bandung City
Cimahi United	2 (4)
Mandala	2 (3)
16 November 2023 – Bandung City
ASAD Purwakarta	4
Perssi	2
16 November 2023 – Bandung City
BRT Subang	2
Persindra	3
16 November 2023 – Bandung City
Perkesit	3
Persikabumi	1

Semi-finals
20 November 2023 – Bandung City
Cimahi United	3
ASAD Purwakarta	2
20 November 2023 – Bandung City
Persindra	0
Perkesit	5

Final
22 November 2023 – Bandung City
Cimahi United	0
Perkesit	1
Third place play-off
ASAD Purwakarta	3
Persindra	2

=== Round of 16 ===
13 November 2023
08.00 WIB

ASAD Purwakarta	6–3	RCK Nusantara
	Report

Lodaya Field, Bandung City

13 November 2023
10.00 WIB

Perkesit	5–0	Tasik Raya
	Report

Lodaya Field, Bandung City

13 November 2023
10.00 WIB

Cimahi United	5–1	WBFC
	Report

Siliwangi Stadium, Bandung City

13 November 2023
13.00 WIB

BRT Subang	1–0	Fanshop FA
	Report

Siliwangi Stadium, Bandung City

14 November 2023
08.00 WIB

Perssi	10–0	Buaran Putra
	Report

Lodaya Field, Bandung City

14 November 2023
10.00 WIB

Pakuan City	1–5	Persikabumi
	Report

Lodaya Field, Bandung City

14 November 2023
10.00 WIB

Mandala	2–1	PS Amdesta
	Report

Siliwangi Stadium, Bandung City

14 November 2023
13.00 WIB

Persindra	8–0	Gemilang Raya
	Report

Siliwangi Stadium, Bandung City

=== Quarter-finals ===
Winners will qualified to the 2024–25 Liga 4 West Java Series 1

16 November 2023
08.00 WIB

ASAD Purwakarta	4–2	Perssi
	Report

Lodaya Field, Bandung City

16 November 2023
10.00 WIB

Perkesit	3–1	Persikabumi
	Report

Lodaya Field, Bandung City

16 November 2023
10.00 WIB

Cimahi United	2–2	Mandala
	Report
Penalties
	4–3

Siliwangi Stadium, Bandung City

16 November 2023
13.00 WIB

BRT Subang	2–3	Persindra
	Report

Siliwangi Stadium, Bandung City

=== Semi-finals ===
20 November 2023
10.00 WIB

Cimahi United	3–2	ASAD Purwakarta
	Report

Siliwangi Stadium, Bandung City

20 November 2023
13.00 WIB

Persindra	0–5	Perkesit
	Report

Siliwangi Stadium, Bandung City

=== Third place play-off ===
22 November 2023
10.00 WIB

ASAD Purwakarta	3–2	Persindra
	Report

Siliwangi Stadium, Bandung City

=== Finals ===
22 November 2023
13.00 WIB

Cimahi United	0–1	Perkesit
	Report

Siliwangi Stadium, Bandung City

== Promotion play-offs ==
=== Format ===
Round	Matchups
Matchday 1	Mandala vs. BRT Subang
Matchday 2	Persikabumi vs. Loser of matchday 1
Matchday 3	Winner of matchday 1 vs. Persikabumi

=== Table ===
Pos	Team	Pld	W	D	L	GF	GA	GD	Pts	Promotion
1	Persikabumi	2	2	0	0	4	1	+3	6	Promotion to the 2024–25 Liga 4 Series 1
2	Mandala	2	1	0	1	3	4	−1	3	Promotion to the 2024–25 Liga 4 Series 1
3	BRT Subang	2	0	0	2	1	3	−2	0	

Source: Play-offs
Rules for classification: 1) Points; 2) Head-to-head points; 3) Head-to-head goal difference; 4) Head-to-head goals scored; 5) Goal difference; 6) Goals scored; 7) Fair-play points; 8) Draw.

=== Matches ===
Matchday 1 (14 November 2024)
14 November 2024
10.00 WIB

Mandala	2–1	BRT Subang
	Report

Pusdikpom Soegiri Infini Arena Field, Cimahi

Matchday 2 (15 November 2024)
15 November 2024
08.00 WIB

Persikabumi	1–0	BRT Subang
	Report

Pusdikpom Soegiri Infini Arena Field, Cimahi

Matchday 3 (16 November 2024)
16 November 2024
10.00 WIB

Mandala	1–3	Persikabumi
	Report

Pusdikpom Soegiri Infini Arena Field, Cimahi

== Promotion to the 2024–25 Liga 4 West Java Series 1 ==
Team	Method of qualification	Date of qualification	Promoted to
Perkesit	Winner of 2023 Liga 3 West Java Series 2	22 November 2023	2024–25 Liga 4 West Java Series 1
Cimahi United	Runner-up of 2023 Liga 3 West Java Series 2	22 November 2023	2024–25 Liga 4 West Java Series 1
ASAD Purwakarta	Third-placed of 2023 Liga 3 West Java Series 2	22 November 2024	2024–25 Liga 4 West Java Series 1
Persindra	Semi-finalist of 2023 Liga 3 West Java Series 2	22 November 2023	2024–25 Liga 4 West Java Series 1
Persikabumi	Winner of promotion play-offs	15 November 2024	2024–25 Liga 4 West Java Series 1
Mandala	Winner of promotion play-offs	15 November 2024	2024–25 Liga 4 West Java Series 1

== See also ==
- 2023 Liga 3 West Java Series 1
- 2023 Liga 3 Banten
- 2023 Liga 3 Jakarta
- 2023 Liga 3 Central Java
- 2023 Liga 3 Special Region of Yogyakarta
- 2023 Liga 3 East Java
