= 2025 Liga 4 West Java Series 2 =

Football league season

Liga 4 West Java Series 2
- Season: 2025
- Dates: 25 October – 24 November 2025
- Champions: Bogor Raya (1st title)
- Promoted: Abinaya Squad; Bogor Raya; Perssi Sukabumi; Riverside Forest

The 2025 Liga 4 West Java Series 2 was the second season of Liga 4 West Java Series 2 after the structural changes of Indonesian football competition and serves as a second division of the Liga 4 West Java.

== Teams ==
=== Teams changes ===
The following teams changed division after the 2024–25 season.

To Series 2
▼ Relegated from Series 1
- Persipo Purwakarta
- Citeureup Raya
- Mandala
- Persikabbar

From Series 2
▲ Promoted to Series 1 (Note: Originally four teams promoted to Series 1, but Persikad (formerly Persikad 1999) moving up to Championship by taking place of Sumut United on 4 June 2025.)
- Patriot Bekasi
- Persikotas
- EASGA

=== Participating teams ===
A total of 47 teams are competing in this season. The teams are divided into 4 blocks (12 groups) based on the geographical location of their homebase. The winner of regency or city leagues marked by bold and new team marked by italic.

No	Location		Team	2024–25 season
Block 1
1	Perssi Sukabumi	Sukabumi City		—N/a
2	Bandung Legend	Bandung City		—N/a
3	Germanesia	Bandung City		—N/a
4	Java Top	Bandung City		—N/a
5	Maung Bandung	Bandung City		5th in Group C
6	Progresif Indonesia	Bandung City		Round of 16
7	Riverside Forest	Bandung City		Quarter-finalist
8	R-MIFA	Bandung City		—N/a
9	UNI Bandung	Bandung City		—N/a
10	Waamanat Bhintuka	Bandung City		—N/a
11	Bionsa Putra Kencana	Bandung Regency		—N/a
12	R2B Legend	Bandung Regency		—N/a
13	Rancaekek	Bandung Regency		4th in Group C
14	Bandung Barat United	West Bandung Regency		Quarter-finalist
15	Inspire Indonesia	West Bandung Regency		5th in Group B
16	Fanshop	Cimahi City		—N/a
17	Siliwangi Cimahi	Cimahi City		—N/a
18	TS Maung Garut	Garut Regency		—N/a
19	Galuh	Ciamis Regency		—N/a
Block 2
20	Indramayu United	Indramayu Regency		Round of 16
21	Bhatara United	Sumedang Regency		—N/a
22	Mandala^{↓}	Majalengka Regency		6th in Group C
23	Diklat Sepakbola Kuningan	Kuningan Regency		—N/a
24	Gemilang Raya	Kuningan Regency		4th in Group E
25	Cirebon United	Cirebon		—N/a
26	PSIT Cirebon	Cirebon		—N/a
27	Banjar Patroman	Banjar City		4th in Group B

No	Location		Team	2024–25 season
Block 3
28	Buaran Putra	Bekasi City		5th in Group D
29	Cikarang City	Bekasi Regency		—N/a
30	PS Amdesta	Bekasi Regency		—N/a
31	Benpica	Karawang Regency		Round of 16
32	Persika Karawang	Karawang Regency		Round of 16
33	Pelita Yudha	Purwakarta Regency		—N/a
34	Persipo Purwakarta^{↓}	Purwakarta Regency		6th in Group B
35	BRT Subang	Subang Regency		Quarter-finalist
Block 4
36	Bojong Gede Raya	Bogor Regency		3rd in Group F
37	Cibinong Poetra	Bogor Regency		—N/a
38	Citeureup Raya^{↓}	Bogor Regency		6th in Group D
39	Imran Soccer Academy	Bogor Regency		—N/a
40	Persikabo Bogor	Bogor Regency		—N/a
41	Satria Sanggeni	Bogor Regency		—N/a
42	Abinaya Squad	Bogor City		—N/a
43	Bogor Raya	Bogor City		—N/a
44	Pakuan City	Bogor City		3rd in Group E
45	Depok City	Depok City		—N/a
46	Depok United	Depok City		Round of 16
47	GWR Family	Depok City		—N/a

^{↓}	Relegated from the Series 1

== First round ==
The draw for the first round took place on 1 October 2025 at the PSSI Secretariat of the West Java Provincial Association, Bandung. The 47 teams will be drawn into 11 groups of four and one groups of three based on the geographical location of their homebase. The first round will be played in a home tournament format of single round-robin matches.

The top two teams of each group will qualify for the knockout round.

=== Group A ===
All matches will be held at Abipraya Rende Stadium, West Bandung.

Pos	Team	Pld	W	D	L	GF	GA	GD	Pts	Qualification	RIV	BBU	FFA	GAL
1	Riverside Forest	3	3	0	0	19	1	+18	9	Qualification to the Knockout round	—	—	7–0	—
2	Bandung Barat United (H)	3	2	0	1	6	3	+3	6	Qualification to the Knockout round	1–2	—	3–1	—
3	Fanshop	3	1	0	2	3	10	−7	3		—	—	—	2–0
4	Galuh	3	0	0	3	0	14	−14	0		0–10	0–2	—	—

Source: Series 2
Legend: Blue = home team win; Yellow = draw; Red = away team win.
Rules for classification: 1) Points; 2) Head-to-head points; 3) Head-to-head goal difference; 4) Head-to-head goals scored; 5) Goal difference; 6) Goals scored; 7) Fair-play points; 8) Draw.
(H) Hosts

=== Group B ===
All matches will be held at Gelora R.A.A. Adiwijaya Stadium, Garut.

Pos	Team	Pld	W	D	L	GF	GA	GD	Pts	Qualification	R2B	MGT	PGN
1	R2B Legend	2	2	0	0	7	3	+4	6	Qualification to the Knockout round	—	—	—
2	TS Maung Garut (H)	2	1	0	1	4	4	0	3	Qualification to the Knockout round	3–4	—	2–1
3	Progresif Indonesia	2	0	0	2	1	5	−4	0		0–3	—	—

Source: Series 2
Legend: Blue = home team win; Yellow = draw; Red = away team win.
Rules for classification: 1) Points; 2) Head-to-head points; 3) Head-to-head goal difference; 4) Head-to-head goals scored; 5) Goal difference; 6) Goals scored; 7) Fair-play points; 8) Draw.
(H) Hosts

=== Group C ===
All matches will be held at Abipraya Rende Stadium, West Bandung.

Pos	Team	Pld	W	D	L	GF	GA	GD	Pts	Qualification	GNE	BSL	RCK	WBN
1	Germanesia	3	2	0	1	7	8	−1	6	Qualification to the Knockout round	—	—	4–3	0–3
2	Siliwangi Cimahi	3	1	1	1	10	7	+3	4	Qualification to the Knockout round	2–3	—	—	5–1
3	Rancaekek	3	1	1	1	9	9	0	4		—	3–3	—	—
4	Waamanat Bhintuka	3	1	0	2	6	8	−2	3		—	—	2–3	—

Source: Series 2
Legend: Blue = home team win; Yellow = draw; Red = away team win.
Rules for classification: 1) Points; 2) Head-to-head points; 3) Head-to-head goal difference; 4) Head-to-head goals scored; 5) Goal difference; 6) Goals scored; 7) Fair-play points; 8) Draw.

=== Group D ===
All matches will be held at Mandala Mukti Stadium, West Bandung.

Pos	Team	Pld	W	D	L	GF	GA	GD	Pts	Qualification	PSI	RMF	MBN	JVT
1	Perssi Sukabumi	3	3	0	0	8	1	+7	9	Qualification to the Knockout round	—	—	2–1	—
2	R-MIFA	3	2	0	1	3	4	−1	6	Qualification to the Knockout round	0–3	—	1–0	—
3	Maung Bandung	3	0	1	2	1	3	−2	1		—	—	—	0–0
4	Java Top	3	0	1	2	1	5	−4	1		0–3	1–2	—	—

Source: Series 2
Legend: Blue = home team win; Yellow = draw; Red = away team win.
Rules for classification: 1) Points; 2) Head-to-head points; 3) Head-to-head goal difference; 4) Head-to-head goals scored; 5) Goal difference; 6) Goals scored; 7) Fair-play points; 8) Draw.

=== Group E ===
All matches will be held at Mandala Mukti Stadium, West Bandung.

Pos	Team	Pld	W	D	L	GF	GA	GD	Pts	Qualification	UNI	INP	BPC	BDL
1	POR UNI Bandung	3	3	0	0	12	1	+11	9	Qualification to the Knockout round	—	—	—	5–0
2	Inspire Indonesia (H)	3	1	1	1	7	6	+1	4	Qualification to the Knockout round	1–5	—		5–0
3	Bionsa Putra Kencana	3	1	1	1	3	3	0	4		0–2	1–1	—	—
4	Bandung Legend	3	0	0	3	0	12	−12	0		—	—	0–2	—

Source: Series 2
Legend: Blue = home team win; Yellow = draw; Red = away team win.
Rules for classification: 1) Points; 2) Head-to-head points; 3) Head-to-head goal difference; 4) Head-to-head goals scored; 5) Goal difference; 6) Goals scored; 7) Fair-play points; 8) Draw.
(H) Hosts

=== Group F ===
All matches will be held at Ibrahim Adjie Field, Kuningan.

Pos	Team	Pld	W	D	L	GF	GA	GD	Pts	Qualification	BJR	GRY	CNU	DSK
1	Banjar Patroman	3	2	0	1	6	3	+3	6	Qualification to the Knockout round	—	0–1	—	4–2
2	Gemilang Raya (H)	3	1	2	0	2	1	+1	5	Qualification to the Knockout round	—	—	—	0–0
3	Cirebon United	3	1	1	1	4	3	+1	4		0–2	1–1	—	—
4	Diklat Sepakbola Kuningan	3	0	1	2	2	7	−5	1		—	—	0–3	—

Source: Series 2
Legend: Blue = home team win; Yellow = draw; Red = away team win.
Rules for classification: 1) Points; 2) Head-to-head points; 3) Head-to-head goal difference; 4) Head-to-head goals scored; 5) Goal difference; 6) Goals scored; 7) Fair-play points; 8) Draw.
(H) Hosts

=== Group G ===
All matches will be held at Ibrahim Adjie Field, Kuningan.

Pos	Team	Pld	W	D	L	GF	GA	GD	Pts	Qualification	TJI	MDL	BHU	IND
1	PSIT Cirebon	3	3	0	0	11	2	+9	9	Qualification to the Knockout round	—	2–1	—	5–1
2	Mandala	3	2	0	1	5	3	+2	6	Qualification to the Knockout round	—	—	2–0	—
3	Bhatara United	3	1	0	2	4	7	−3	3		0–4	—	—	4–1
4	Indramayu United	3	0	0	3	3	11	−8	0		—	1–2	—	—

Source: Series 2
Legend: Blue = home team win; Yellow = draw; Red = away team win.
Rules for classification: 1) Points; 2) Head-to-head points; 3) Head-to-head goal difference; 4) Head-to-head goals scored; 5) Goal difference; 6) Goals scored; 7) Fair-play points; 8) Draw.

=== Group H ===
All matches will be held at Purnawarman Stadium, Purwakarta.

Pos	Team	Pld	W	D	L	GF	GA	GD	Pts	Qualification	BEN	PKA	CKR	AMD
1	Benpica	3	2	1	0	4	2	+2	7	Qualification to the Knockout round	—	—	1–0	—
2	Persika Karawang	3	1	2	0	5	3	+2	5	Qualification to the Knockout round	2–2	—	0–0	—
3	Cikarang City	3	1	1	1	1	1	0	4		—	—	—	1–0
4	PS Amdesta	3	0	0	3	1	5	−4	0		0–1	1–3	—	—

Source: Series 2
Legend: Blue = home team win; Yellow = draw; Red = away team win.
Rules for classification: 1) Points; 2) Head-to-head points; 3) Head-to-head goal difference; 4) Head-to-head goals scored; 5) Goal difference; 6) Goals scored; 7) Fair-play points; 8) Draw.

=== Group I ===
All matches will be held at Purnawarman Stadium, Purwakarta.

Pos	Team	Pld	W	D	L	GF	GA	GD	Pts	Qualification	BRT	PPO	PLY	BUA
1	PS BRT Subang	3	3	0	0	10	1	+9	9	Qualification to the Knockout round	—	—	3–0	5–1
2	Persipo Purwakarta (H)	3	2	0	1	8	3	+5	6	Qualification to the Knockout round	0–2	—	—	—
3	Pelita Yudha	3	1	0	2	3	6	−3	3		—	0–2	—	3–1
4	Buaran Putra	3	0	0	3	3	14	−11	0		—	1–6	—	—

Source: Series 2
Legend: Blue = home team win; Yellow = draw; Red = away team win.
Rules for classification: 1) Points; 2) Head-to-head points; 3) Head-to-head goal difference; 4) Head-to-head goals scored; 5) Goal difference; 6) Goals scored; 7) Fair-play points; 8) Draw.
(H) Hosts

=== Group J ===
All matches will be held at Banjaran Football Field, Depok.

Pos	Team	Pld	W	D	L	GF	GA	GD	Pts	Qualification	BGD	ABN	SSN	DPC
1	Bojong Gede Raya	3	3	0	0	13	3	+10	9	Qualification to the Knockout round	—	4–3	6–0	—
2	Abinaya Squad	3	2	0	1	9	4	+5	6	Qualification to the Knockout round	—	—	3–0	3–0
3	Satria Sanggeni	3	1	0	2	3	9	−6	3		—	—	—	3–0
4	Depok City (H)	3	0	0	3	0	9	−9	0		0–3	—	—	—

Source: Series 2
Legend: Blue = home team win; Yellow = draw; Red = away team win.
Rules for classification: 1) Points; 2) Head-to-head points; 3) Head-to-head goal difference; 4) Head-to-head goals scored; 5) Goal difference; 6) Goals scored; 7) Fair-play points; 8) Draw.
(H) Hosts

=== Group K ===
All matches will be held at Banjaran Football Field, Depok.

Pos	Team	Pld	W	D	L	GF	GA	GD	Pts	Qualification	GWR	CBP	DUN	CTR
1	GWR Family	3	2	1	0	6	3	+3	7	Qualification to the Knockout round	—	2–0	—	—
2	Cibinong Poetra	3	2	0	1	5	3	+2	6	Qualification to the Knockout round	—	—	2–0	3–1
3	Depok United (H)	3	1	1	1	6	5	+1	4		2–2	—	—	4–1
4	Citeureup Raya	3	0	0	3	3	9	−6	0		1–2	—	—	—

Source: Series 2
Legend: Blue = home team win; Yellow = draw; Red = away team win.
Rules for classification: 1) Points; 2) Head-to-head points; 3) Head-to-head goal difference; 4) Head-to-head goals scored; 5) Goal difference; 6) Goals scored; 7) Fair-play points; 8) Draw.
(H) Hosts

=== Group L ===
All matches will be held at Banjaran Football Field, Depok.

Pos	Team	Pld	W	D	L	GF	GA	GD	Pts	Qualification	BRY	PAK	PBO	ISA
1	Bogor Raya	3	2	0	1	13	5	+8	6	Qualification to the Knockout round	—	—	1–2	—
2	Pakuan City	3	1	1	1	6	9	−3	4	Qualification to the Knockout round	2–6	—	—	2–2
3	Persikabo Bogor	3	1	1	1	4	4	0	4		—	1–2	—	1–1
4	Imran Soccer Academy	3	0	2	1	4	9	−5	2		1–6	—	—	—

Source: Series 2
Legend: Blue = home team win; Yellow = draw; Red = away team win.
Rules for classification: 1) Points; 2) Head-to-head points; 3) Head-to-head goal difference; 4) Head-to-head goals scored; 5) Goal difference; 6) Goals scored; 7) Fair-play points; 8) Draw.

== Knockout round ==
The knockout round will be played as a single match. If tied after regulation time, extra time and, if necessary, a penalty shoot-out will be used to decide the winning team.

=== Qualified teams ===
Group	Winner	Runner-up
A	Riverside Forest	Bandung Barat United
B	R2B Legend	TS Maung Garut
C	Germanesia	Siliwangi Cimahi
D	Perssi Sukabumi	R-MIFA
E	POR UNI Bandung	Inspire Indonesia
F	Banjar Patroman	Gemilang Raya
G	PSIT Cirebon	Mandala
H	Benpica	Persika Karawang
I	PS BRT Subang	Persipo Purwakarta
J	Bojong Gede Raya	Abinaya Squad
K	GWR Family	Cibinong Poetra
L	Bogor Raya	Pakuan City

=== Round of 24 ===
Summary

Team 1	Score	Team 2
POR UNI Bandung	0–1	Gemilang Raya
Riverside Forest	15–0	TS Maung Garut
Germanesia	2–3	R-MIFA
Bojong Gede Raya	2–0	Persipo Purwakarta
Benpica	2–2 (a.e.t.) (2–4 p)	Mandala
Perssi Sukabumi	2–1	Bara Siliwangi
PSIT Cirebon	1–0	Persika Karawang
Banjar Patroman	1–1 (a.e.t.) (4–2 p)	Inspire Indonesia
Bogor Raya	3–0	Cibinong Poetra
PS BRT Subang	0–0 (a.e.t.) (3–4 p)	Abinaya Squad
R2B Legend	0–0 (a.e.t.) (3–2 p)	Bandung Barat United
GWR Family	1–0	Pakuan City

Matches

4 November 2025
08.00 WIB (UTC+7)

POR UNI Bandung	0–1	Gemilang Raya

Pusdikpom Soegiri Infini Arena, Cimahi

4 November 2025
08.00 WIB (UTC+7)

Riverside Forest	15–0	TS Maung Garut

KOCI Soccer Field, Depok

4 November 2025
10.00 WIB (UTC+7)

Germanesia	2–3	R-MIFA

Pusdikpom Soegiri Infini Arena, Cimahi

4 November 2025
10.00 WIB (UTC+7)

Bojong Gede Raya	2–0	Persipo Purwakarta

KOCI Soccer Field, Depok

4 November 2025
13.00 WIB (UTC+7)

Benpica	2–2 (a.e.t.)	Mandala
Penalties
	2–4

Pusdikpom Soegiri Infini Arena, Cimahi

4 November 2025
13.00 WIB (UTC+7)

Perssi Sukabumi	2–1	Bara Siliwangi

KOCI Soccer Field, Depok

5 November 2025
08.00 WIB (UTC+7)

PSIT Cirebon	1–0	Persika Karawang

Pusdikpom Soegiri Infini Arena, Cimahi

5 November 2025
08.00 WIB (UTC+7)

Banjar Patroman	1–1 (a.e.t.)	Inspire Indonesia
Penalties
	4–2

KOCI Soccer Field, Depok

5 November 2025
10.00 WIB (UTC+7)

Bogor Raya	3–0	Cibinong Poetra

Pusdikpom Soegiri Infini Arena, Cimahi

5 November 2025
10.00 WIB (UTC+7)

PS BRT Subang	0–0 (a.e.t.)	Abinaya Squad
Penalties
	3–4

KOCI Soccer Field, Depok

5 November 2025
13.00 WIB (UTC+7)

R2B Legend	0–0 (a.e.t.)	Bandung Barat United
Penalties
	3–2

Pusdikpom Soegiri Infini Arena, Cimahi

5 November 2025
13.00 WIB (UTC+7)

GWR Family	1–0	Pakuan City

KOCI Soccer Field, Depok

=== Round of 12 ===
Summary

Team 1	Score	Team 2
Riverside Forest	3–0	R-MIFA
Gemilang Raya	0–1	PSIT Cirebon
Abinaya Squad	1–0	GWR Family
Bogor Raya	1–0	Bojong Gede Raya
Mandala	1–1 (a.e.t.) (1–3 p)	Banjar Patroman
Perssi Sukabumi	1–0	R2B Legend

Matches

10 November 2025
08.00 WIB (UTC+7)

Riverside Forest	3–0	R-MIFA

Pusdikpom Soegiri Infini Arena, Cimahi

10 November 2025
10.00 WIB (UTC+7)

Gemilang Raya	0–1	PSIT Cirebon

Pusdikpom Soegiri Infini Arena, Cimahi

10 November 2025
13.00 WIB (UTC+7)

Abinaya Squad	1–0	GWR Family

Pusdikpom Soegiri Infini Arena, Cimahi

11 November 2025
08.00 WIB (UTC+7)

Bogor Raya	1–0	Bojong Gede Raya

Pusdikpom Soegiri Infini Arena, Cimahi

11 November 2025
10.00 WIB (UTC+7)

Mandala	1–1 (a.e.t.)	Banjar Patroman
Penalties
	1–3

Pusdikpom Soegiri Infini Arena, Cimahi

11 November 2025
13.00 WIB (UTC+7)

Perssi Sukabumi	1-0	R2B Legend

Pusdikpom Soegiri Infini Arena, Cimahi

=== Round of 8 ===
Summary

Team 1	Score	Team 2
Riverside Forest	bye	
PSIT Cirebon	0–1	Abinaya Squad
Bogor Raya	bye	
Banjar Patroman	2–2 (a.e.t.) (2–4 p)	Perssi Sukabumi

Matches

17 November 2025
08.00 WIB (UTC+7)

PSIT Cirebon	0–1	Abinaya Squad

Pusdikpom Soegiri Infini Arena, Cimahi

17 November 2025
10.00 WIB (UTC+7)

Banjar Patroman	2–2 (a.e.t.)	Perssi Sukabumi
Penalties
	2–4

Pusdikpom Soegiri Infini Arena, Cimahi

=== Semi-final ===
Summary

Team 1	Score	Team 2
Riverside Forest	1–1 (a.e.t.) (2–3 p)	Abinaya Squad
Bogor Raya	2–1	Perssi Sukabumi

Matches

21 November 2025
09.00 WIB (UTC+7)

Riverside Forest	1–1 (a.e.t.)	Abinaya Squad
Penalties
	2–3

Pusdikpom Soegiri Infini Arena, Cimahi

21 November 2025
13.00 WIB (UTC+7)

Bogor Raya	2–1	Perssi Sukabumi

Pusdikpom Soegiri Infini Arena, Cimahi

=== Third place play-off ===
Summary

Team 1	Score	Team 2
Riverside Forest	1–1 (a.e.t.) (4–3 p)	Perssi Sukabumi

Match

24 November 2025
08.30 WIB (UTC+7)

Riverside Forest	1–1 (a.e.t.)	Perssi Sukabumi
Penalties
	4–3

Pusdikpom Soegiri Infini Arena, Cimahi

=== Final ===
Team 1	Score	Team 2
Abinaya Squad	0–2	Bogor Raya

Match

24 November 2025
13.30 WIB (UTC+7)

Abinaya Squad	0–2	Bogor Raya

Pusdikpom Soegiri Infini Arena, Cimahi

== See also ==
- 2025–26 Liga 4
- 2025–26 Liga 4 West Java Series 1
