= Cendrawasih dance =

Indonesian (Balinese) traditional dance

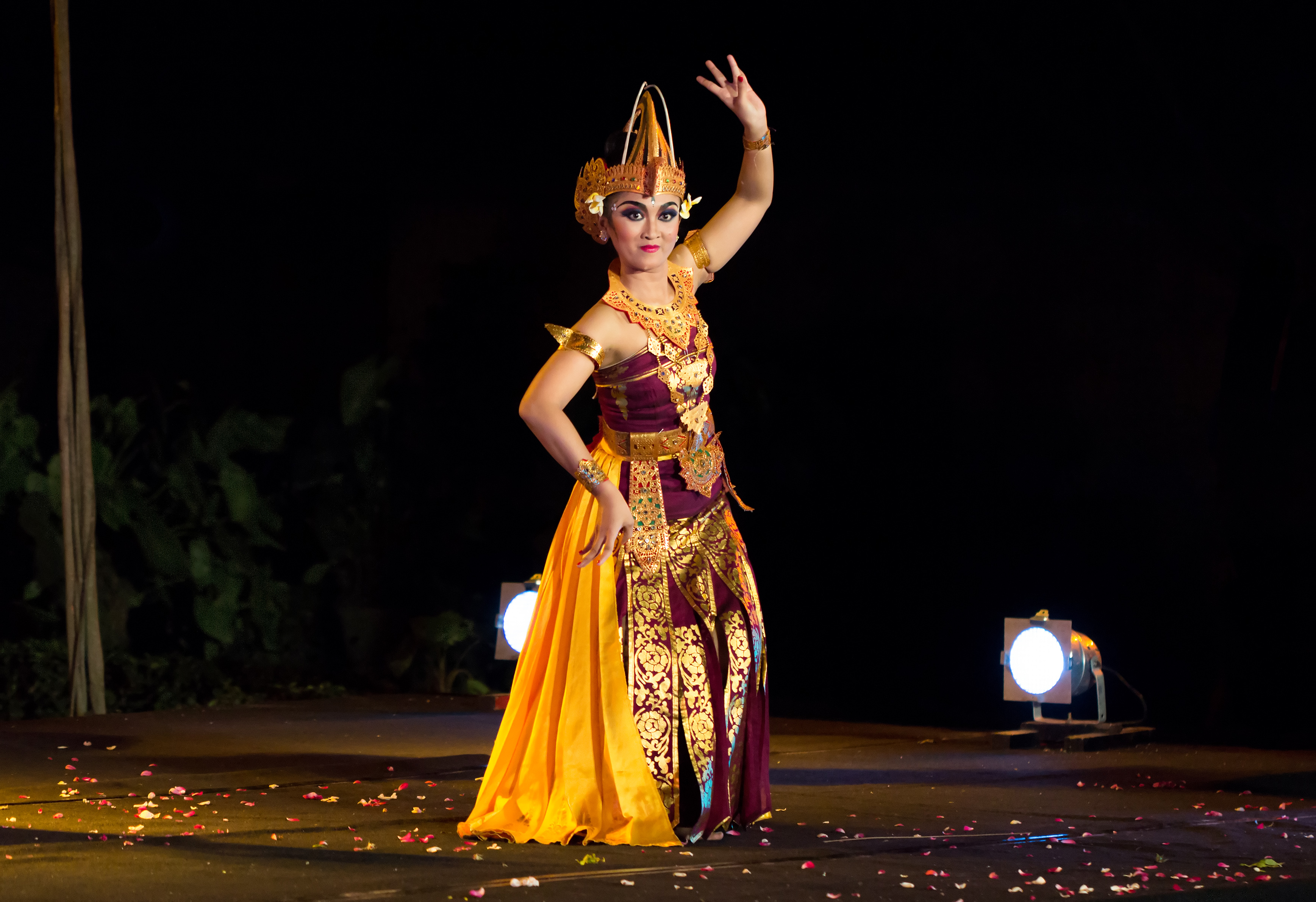
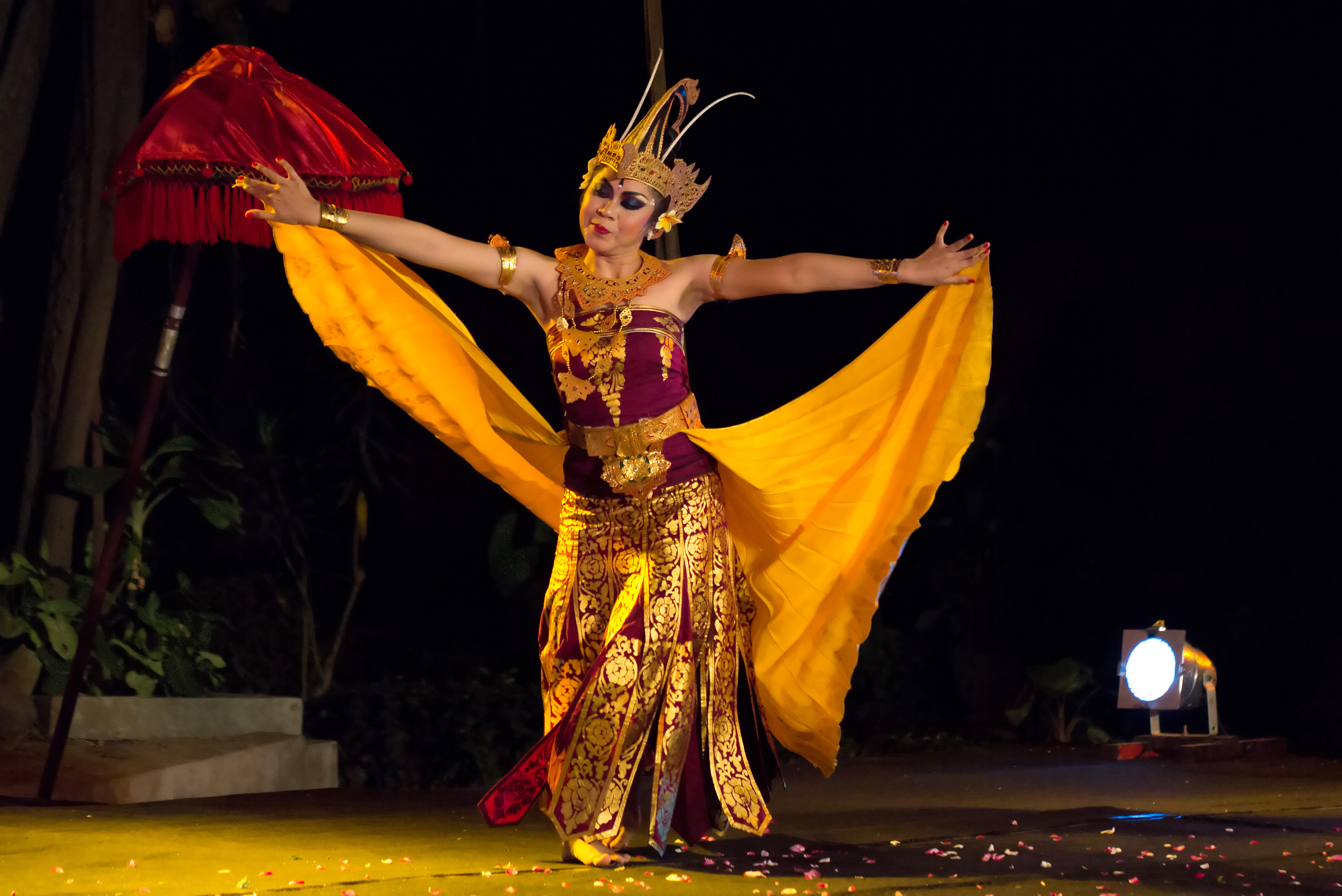
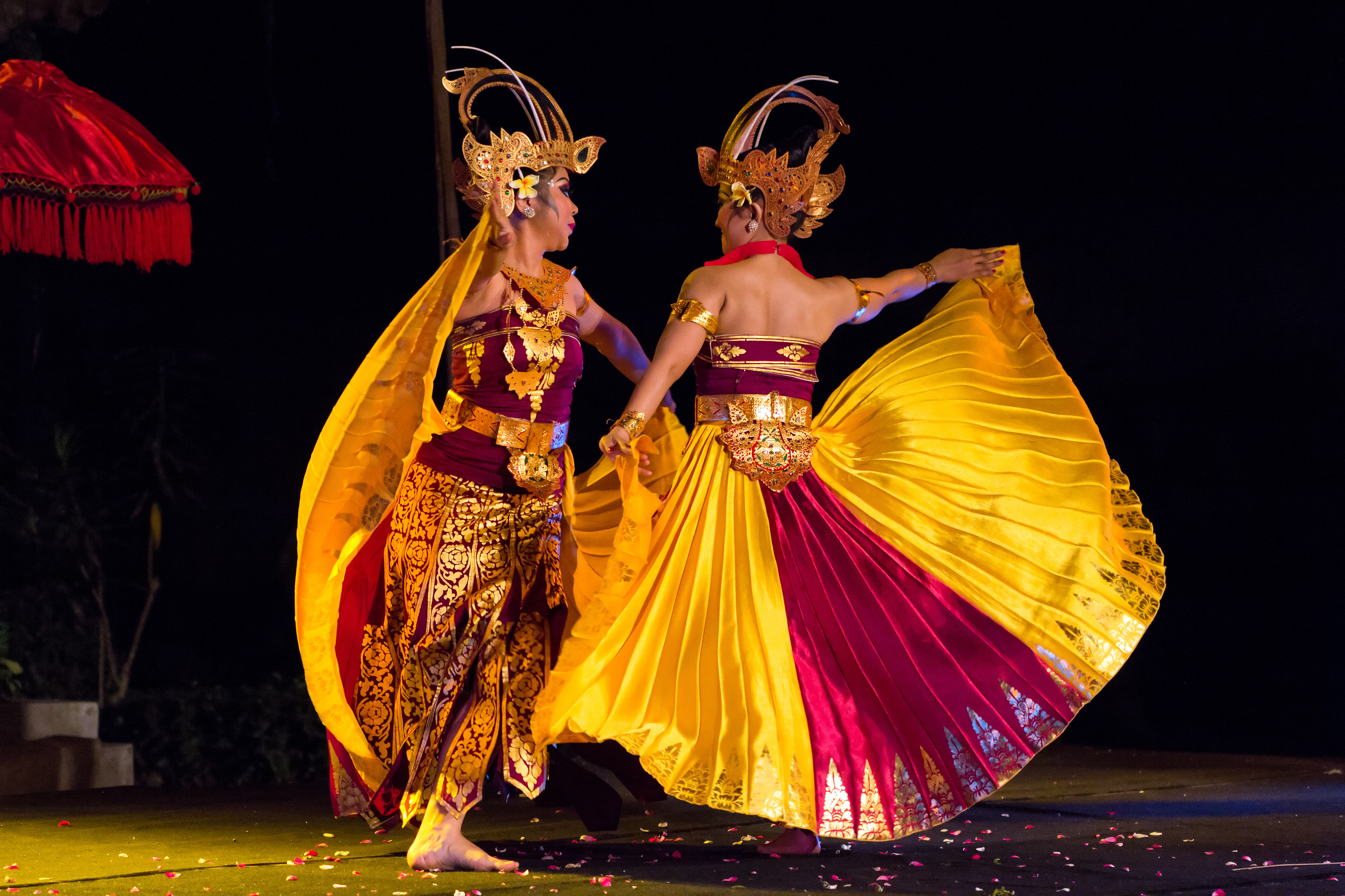
- Cendrawasih dance movements
- Native name: ᬘᭂᬦ᭄ᬤ᭄ᬭᬯᬲᬶᬄ (Balinese); Tari cendrawasih (Indonesian)
- Instrument(s): Gamelan, Suling, Kendhang
- Inventor: Balinese
- Origin: Indonesia

The cendrawasih dance (from Balinese ᬘᭂᬦ᭄ᬤ᭄ᬭᬯᬲᬶᬄ 'candrawasih') is a Balinese dance which is performed by two female dancers and illustrates the mating rituals of the bird of paradise (burung cendrawasih in Indonesian).

== History ==
A dance known as cendrawasih was designed by I Gde Manik and was first performed in the Sawan subdistrict of the Buleleng Regency in the 1920s; the area is the origin of numerous dances, including Trunajaya, Wirangjaya, and Palawakya. However, this version was significantly different from the dance that is now commonly performed.

Present-day performances of the cendrawasih dance originate from choreography by N. L. N. Swasthi Wijaya Bandem, who arranged for the first performance in 1988. The cendrawasih dance is inspired by the bird of paradise, which is known as burung cendrawasih in Indonesian and as manuk dewata ("the bird of the gods") in Balinese. This genus of bird is known to dance and sing when attempting to attract a mate. The cendrawasih dance is one of several Balinese dances inspired by birds; others include the Manuk Rawa and Belibis dances.

Choreographers of individual performances are allowed to include their own interpretations. The cendrawasih dance is often performed outside of Indonesia when promoting Indonesian culture, such as in Peru in 2002, at the Freer Gallery of Art in Washington, D.C., in 2008, Japan in 2008, and the Netherlands in 2008.

A 2014 study found that a single performance of the cendrawasih dance could burn 40 calories, or 5 calories per minute of dancing, with dancers' heart rates reaching an average of 157 beats per minute. Thus, the researchers classified a mild-intensity aerobic exercise.

== Performance ==
The dance is performed by two women, one portraying a male bird of paradise, and one portraying a female; the dance takes the form of a mating ritual. The dancers are dressed in Pandji-style headdresses with feathers stuck in them, as well as long flowing scarves or skirts with a pink stripe. The skirts serve as the colourful tails of the birds of paradise, and when held give the impression of wings. The fluttering of the skirts when running give an impression of flight.

Many of the movements are not present in other Balinese dance forms. For instance, dancers use their trailing costumes to symbolize the wings of the birds of paradise and stand en pointe. The two dancers also flutter about as if they are flirting.

== See also ==
- Barong
- Balinese dance
- Kebagh dance
- Dance in Indonesia

== Works cited ==
- Adiartha Griadhi, I Putu; Dwi Primayanti, Dewa Ayu Inten (July 2014). "Karakteristik Denyut Nadi Kerja dan Jumlah Pemakaian Energy pada Tarian Tradisional Bali Memenuhi Kriteria Aktivitas Fisik Erobik Intensitas Ringan – Sedang yang Bermanfaat untuk Mahasiswa Fakultas Kedokteran Universitas Udayana" [Characteristics of Heart Rate and Energy Use in Traditional Balinese Dance, Meeting the Criteria for Mild-Intensity Aerobic Exercise, Useful for Students of the Medical Faculty at Udayana University]. Sport and Fitness Journal (in Indonesian). 2 (2). Denpasar: Udayana University: 1–8. ISSN 2302-688X.
- Ayu, Eka Savitri Sastrawan Dewa (2013). "Gerak Tari Cendrawasih sebagai Sumber Inspirasi Karya Seni Lukis" [Movements in the Cendrawasih Dance as a Source of Inspiration for Visual Arts] (in Indonesian). Denpasar: ISI Denpasar.
- "Balinese Music and Dance: Gamelan Mitra Kusuma". Smithsonian Institution. 2008. Archived from the original on 23 September 2015.
- Dibia, I; Ballinger, Rucina (2004). Balinese Dance, Drama & Music: A Guide to the Performing Arts of Bali. Tuttle. ISBN 978-962-593-195-1.
- "Dewi promotes RI culture abroad". The Jakarta Post. 2 June 2008. Archived from the original on 7 November 2014.
- "Ni Made Darmi, former palace dancer, stays active". The Jakarta Post. 2 November 2007. Archived from the original on 7 November 2014.
- "Para Penari Jepang Ramaikan PKB" [Japanese Dancers Bring Joy to the Balinese Art Festival]. Kompas (in Indonesian). 11 July 2008. Archived from the original on 29 November 2014.
- "Renovasi Tari Cendrawasih" [Renewing the Cendrawasih Dance]. Bali Post (in Indonesian). 10 September 2012. (registration required)
- "RI, Peru in cultural diplomacy". The Jakarta Post. 5 September 2002. Archived from the original on 7 November 2014.
- "Tari Cendrawasih Keelokan Gerak dan Busana" [Cendrawasih Dance: The Beauty of Costume and Movement]. Pikiran Rakyat (in Indonesian). 12 February 2014. Archived from the original on 7 November 2014.
- Wardany, Irawaty (14 July 2008). "Japanese perform Balinese dances". The Jakarta Post. Archived from the original on 7 November 2014.
