= 2024 Liga 4 West Java Series 2 =

Liga 4 West Java Series 2
- Season: 2024
- Dates: 5–28 December 2024
- Champions: Patriot Bekasi (1st title)
- Promoted: Patriot Bekasi; Persikad 1999; Persikotas; EASGA
- Matches: 68
- Goals: 103 (1.51 per match)
- Top goalscorer: Danis Rizal (9 goals)
- Biggest win: Patriot Bekasi 8–0 Bekasi United (5 December 2024); Sultan Muda 0–8 Maung Anom (5 December 2024); Rancaekek 0–8 Persikotas (9 December 2024)
- Highest scoring: Patriot Bekasi 8–0 Bekasi United (5 December 2024); Sultan Muda 0–8 Maung Anom (5 December 2024); Rancaekek 0–8 Persikotas (9 December 2024); Patriot Bekasi 6–2 Benpica (16 December 2024)

The 2024 Liga 4 West Java Series 2 was the inaugural season of Liga 4 West Java Series 2 after the structural changes of Indonesian football competition and serves as a second division of the Liga 4 West Java. The competition is organised by the West Java Provincial PSSI Association.

== Teams ==
=== Teams changes ===
The following teams changed division after the 2023–24 season.

▲ Promoted to Series 1
- ASAD Purwakarta
- Cimahi United
- Mandala
- Perkesit
- Persikabumi
- Persindra

=== Participating teams ===
A total of 28 teams are competing in this season. The teams are divided into 3 blocks based on the geographical location of their homebase.

No	Team	Location	2023 season
Block 1
1	Maung Anom	Bandung City	First round (5th in Group C)
2	Maung Bandung	Bandung City	First round (3rd in Group E)
3	Riverside Forest	Bandung City	First round (3rd in Group B)
4	Roksi	Bandung City	—
5	Sultan Muda	Bandung City	—
6	Super Progresif	Bandung City	First round (4th in Group A)
7	Bandung Timur	Bandung Regency	First round (4th in Group D)
8	Parma	Bandung Regency	—
9	Rancaekek	Bandung Regency	First round (3rd in Group H)
10	Banjar Patroman	Banjar City	—
11	PLG Parahyangan	Cimahi City	—
12	BRT Subang	Subang Regency	Quarter-finalist
13	Persikotas	Tasikmalaya City	—
14	Bandung Barat United	West Bandung Regency	—
15	Inspire	West Bandung Regency	First round (3rd in Group D)

No	Team	Location	2023 season
Block 2
16	Buaran Putra	Bekasi City	Round of 16
17	Patriot Bekasi	Bekasi City	—
18	Bekasi United	Bekasi Regency	First round (4th in Group C)
19	Benpica	Karawang Regency	First round (5th in Group E)
20	Persika	Karawang Regency	First round (3rd in Group C)
Block 3
21	Pakuan City	Bogor City	Round of 16
22	Bojong Gede Raya	Bogor Regency	First round (4th in Group B)
23	RCK Nusantara	Cianjur Regency	Round of 16
24	Depok United	Depok City	—
25	Persikad 1999	Depok City	First round (3rd in Group G)
26	Indramayu United	Indramayu Regency	—
27	EASGA	Kuningan Regency	—
28	Gemilang Raya	Kuningan Regency	Round of 16

=== Personnel and kits ===
Note: Flags indicate national team as has been defined under FIFA eligibility rules. Players and coaches may hold more than one non-FIFA nationality.

Block 1

Team	Head coach	Captain	Kit manufacturer	Main kit sponsor	Other kit sponsor(s)
Maung Anom	(Indonesia) Cipta Adikodrati	(Indonesia) Yudhistira Arya Nugraha	(Indonesia) Ereight	None	List: Front: None; Back: None; Sleeves: None; Shorts: None
Maung Bandung					List: Front: Back: Sleeves: Shorts:
Riverside Forest	(Indonesia) Suwita Pata		(Indonesia) Altertown	BIRDS.	List: Front: None; Back: None; Sleeves: None; Shorts: None
Roksi					List: Front: Back: Sleeves: Shorts:
Sultan Muda					List: Front: Back: Sleeves: Shorts:
Super Progresif					List: Front: Back: Sleeves: Shorts:
Bandung Timur			(Indonesia) WR Sport Apparel		List: Front: Back: Sleeves: Shorts:
Parma			(Indonesia) JA Sport Gear	Harry Gordyn	List: Front: JA Sport Gear; Back: Sleeves: Shorts:
Rancaekek					List: Front: Back: Sleeves: Shorts:
Banjar Patroman				Trimagi	List: Front: Back: Sleeves: Shorts:
PLG Parahyangan					List: Front: Back: Sleeves: Shorts:
BRT Subang					List: Front: Back: Sleeves: Shorts:
Persikotas	(Indonesia) Ronny Remon	(Indonesia) Deogo Andrian	(Indonesia) Zestien	KAI	List: Front: Tiga Mawar Sejati, Lemona Cake & Bakery, tvonenews.com, Primajasa; Back: Radio Galuh 89.5 FM; Sleeves: Idea Run, PT Hayati Putra Mandiri; Shorts: None
Bandung Barat United			Sema Indonesia	PT Adinnata Land Development	List: Front: None; Back: None; Sleeves: None; Shorts: None
Inspire					List: Front: Back: Sleeves: Shorts:

Block 2

Team	Head coach	Captain	Kit manufacturer	Main kit sponsor	Other kit sponsor(s)
Buaran Putra					List: Front: Back: Sleeves: Shorts:
Patriot Bekasi	(Indonesia) M. Icksan Kartika	(Indonesia) Tegar	(Indonesia) HNY Apparel	None	List: Front: None; Back: None; Sleeves: None; Shorts: None
Bekasi United					List: Front: Back: Sleeves: Shorts:
Benpica					List: Front: Back: Sleeves: Shorts:
Persika		(Indonesia) M. Reyes	(Indonesia) Elcurva Store	Elcurva Store	List: Front: Karawang Kolektif, Dea Eka Rizaldi, Titoko Jaya, Dibatama Motorsport; Back: Karawang Viking, Elang Hitam; Sleeves: Forever Red; Shorts: None

Block 3

Team	Head coach	Captain	Kit manufacturer	Main kit sponsor	Other kit sponsor(s)
Pakuan City				Satwagia	List: Front: Sutan Vet Medika, Cimahpar Stoneyard, Global Sinema Media, KetoVar, Mitoki, MilkyVar; Back: Sleeves: Shorts:
Bojong Gede Raya					List: Front: Back: Sleeves: Shorts:
RCK Nusantara			(Indonesia) Arafs Apparel	None	List: Front: Back: Sleeves: Shorts:
Depok United					List: Front: Back: Sleeves: Shorts:
Persikad 1999				Trimagi	List: Front: Back: Sleeves: Shorts:
Indramayu United	(Indonesia) Yono Rosadi		(Indonesia) Ehsan Apparel	Agrosae Store	List: Front: KIAGIB 40SL; Back: None; Sleeves: None; Shorts: None
EASGA	(Indonesia) Haryadi		(Indonesia) Losco	None	List: Front: Back: Sleeves: Shorts:
Gemilang Raya					List: Front: Back: Sleeves: Shorts:

== Schedule ==
The schedule of the competition is as follows.

Round	Draw date	Matchday		Date
Round	Draw date	Groups of five	Groups of four	Date
First round	17 November 2024	Matchday 1	Matchday 1	5–7 December 2024
First round	17 November 2024	Matchday 2	Matchday 2	7 & 9–10 December 2024
First round	17 November 2024	Matchday 3	Matchday 3	11–13 December 2024
First round	17 November 2024	Matchday 4	—N/a	13–14 December 2024
First round	17 November 2024	Matchday 5	—N/a	16 December 2024
Knockout round	17 November 2024	Round of 16		19–22 December 2024
Knockout round	17 November 2024	Quarter-finals		23–24 December 2024
Knockout round	17 November 2024	Semi-finals		26 December 2024
Knockout round	17 November 2024	Third place play-off		28 December 2024
Knockout round	17 November 2024	Final		28 December 2024

== First round ==
The draw for the first round took place on November 17 at the PSSI Secretariat of the West Java Provincial Association, Bandung. The 28 teams will be drawn into four groups of five and two groups of four based on the geographical location of their homebase. The first round will be played in a home tournament format of single round-robin matches.

The top three teams of group A—D and the top two teams from group E & F will qualify for the knockout round.

=== Group A ===
All matches will be held at Pusdikpom Soegiri Infini Arena and Pusdik Armed Field, Cimahi.

Pos	Team	Pld	W	D	L	GF	GA	GD	Pts	Qualification	ANM	RIV	BBU	SUL	BTM
1	Maung Anom	4	3	1	0	16	1	+15	10	Qualification to the Knockout round	—	1–1	4–0	—	—
2	Riverside Forest	4	3	1	0	11	2	+9	10	Qualification to the Knockout round	—	—	4–1	—	3–0 (Note: The match was awarded as a 3–0 victory to Riverside Forest, after Bandung Timur did not send their team for the match.)
3	Bandung Barat United	4	2	0	2	10	9	+1	6	Qualification to the Knockout round	—	—	—	6–1	3–0 (Note: The match initially ended with a score of Bandung Barat United 1-2 Bandung Timur. However, the PSSI West Java provincial association gave the score 3-0 for Bandung Barat United due to the late payment of registration fees by Bandung Timur.)
4	Sultan Muda	4	1	0	3	4	17	−13	3		0–8	3–0 (Note: The match was awarded as a 3–0 victory to Riverside forest, after Sultan Muda did not send their team for the match.)	—	—	—
5	Bandung Timur	4	0	0	4	0	12	−12	0		0–3 (Note: The match was awarded as a 3–0 victory to Maung Anom, after Bandung Timur did not send their team for the match.)	—	—	3–0 (Note: The match initially ended with a score of Bandung Timur 1-0 Sultan Muda. However, the PSSI West Java provincial association gave the score 3-0 for Sultan Muda due to the late payment of registration fees by Bandung Timur.)	—

Source: Series 2
Legend: Blue = home team win; Yellow = draw; Red = away team win.
Rules for classification: 1) Points; 2) Head-to-head points; 3) Head-to-head goal difference; 4) Head-to-head goals scored; 5) Goal difference; 6) Goals scored; 7) Fair-play points; 8) Draw.
Notes:

Matches

Matchday 1 (5 December 2024)
5 December 2024
08.00 WIB

Bandung Barat United	~~1–2~~ 3–0 Awarded (Note: The match initially ended with a score of Bandung Barat United 1-2 Bandung Timur. However, the PSSI West Java provincial association gave the score 3-0 for Bandung Barat United due to the late payment of registration fees by Bandung Timur.)	Bandung Timur
	Report

Pusdikpom Soegiri Infini Arena, Cimahi
5 December 2024
10.00 WIB

Sultan Muda	0–8	Maung Anom
	Report

Pusdikpom Soegiri Infini Arena, Cimahi

Matchday 2 (9 December 2024)
9 December 2024
08.00 WIB

Riverside Forest	4–1	Bandung Barat United
	Report

Pusdikpom Soegiri Infini Arena, Cimahi
9 December 2024
10.00 WIB

Bandung Timur	~~1–0~~ 0–3 Awarded (Note: The match initially ended with a score of Bandung Timur 1-0 Sultan Muda. However, the PSSI West Java provincial association gave the score 3-0 for Sultan Muda due to the late payment of registration fees by Bandung Timur.)	Sultan Muda
	Report

Pusdikpom Soegiri Infini Arena, Cimahi

Matchday 3 (11 December 2024)
11 December 2024
08.00 WIB

Maung Anom	1–1	Riverside Forest
	Report

Pusdikpom Soegiri Infini Arena, Cimahi
11 December 2024
10.00 WIB

Bandung Barat United	6–1	Sultan Muda
	Report

Pusdikpom Soegiri Infini Arena, Cimahi

Matchday 4 (14 December 2024)
14 December 2024
13.00 WIB

Riverside Forest	3–0 Awarded (Note: The match was awarded as a 3–0 victory to Riverside Forest, after Bandung Timur did not send their team for the match.)	Bandung Timur

Pusdikpom Soegiri Infini Arena, Cimahi
14 December 2024
15.00 WIB

Maung Anom	4–0	Bandung Barat United
	Report

Pusdik Armed Field, Cimahi

Matchday 5 (16 December 2024)
16 December 2024
08.00 WIB

Bandung Timur	0–3 Awarded (Note: The match was awarded as a 3–0 victory to Maung Anom, after Bandung Timur did not send their team for the match.)	Maung Anom

Pusdikpom Soegiri Infini Arena, Cimahi
16 December 2024
10.00 WIB

Sultan Muda	0–3 Awarded (Note: The match was awarded as a 3–0 victory to Riverside Forest, after Sultan Muda did not send their team for the match.)	Riverside Forest

Pusdikpom Soegiri Infini Arena, Cimahi

=== Group B ===
All matches will be held at Inspire Arena, West Bandung.

Pos	Team	Pld	W	D	L	GF	GA	GD	Pts	Qualification	PAR	PLG	ROK	BJR	INS
1	Parma	4	2	2	0	3	0	+3	8	Qualification to the Knockout round	—	0–0	—	1–0	—
2	PLG Parahyangan	4	1	3	0	2	1	+1	6	Qualification to the Knockout round	—	—	1–0	—	0–0
3	Roksi	4	1	2	1	6	4	+2	5	Qualification to the Knockout round	0–0	—	—		—
4	Banjar Patroman	4	1	2	1	6	5	+1	5		—	1–1	—	—	3–1
5	Inspire	4	0	1	3	2	9	−7	1		0–2	—	1–4	—	—

Source: Series 2
Legend: Blue = home team win; Yellow = draw; Red = away team win.
Rules for classification: 1) Points; 2) Head-to-head points; 3) Head-to-head goal difference; 4) Head-to-head goals scored; 5) Goal difference; 6) Goals scored; 7) Fair-play points; 8) Draw.

Matches

Matchday 1 (6 December 2024)
6 December 2024
07.30 WIB

Inspire	1–4	Roksi
	Report

Inspire Arena, West Bandung
6 December 2024
09.30 WIB

Parma	1–0	Banjar Patroman
	Report

Inspire Arena, West Bandung

Matchday 2 (9 December 2024)
9 December 2024
13.00 WIB

PLG Parahyangan	0–0	Inspire
	Report

Inspire Arena, West Bandung
9 December 2024
15.00 WIB

Roksi	0–0	Parma
	Report

Inspire Arena, West Bandung

Matchday 3 (11 December 2024)
11 December 2024
08.00 WIB

Banjar Patroman	1–1	PLG Parahyangan
	Report

Inspire Arena, West Bandung
11 December 2024
10.00 WIB

Inspire	0–2	Parma
	Report

Inspire Arena, West Bandung

Matchday 4 (13 December 2024)
13 December 2024
13.00 WIB

PLG Parahyangan	1–0	Roksi
	Report

Inspire Arena, West Bandung
13 December 2024
15.00 WIB

Banjar Patroman	3–1	Inspire
	Report

Inspire Arena, West Bandung

Matchday 5 (16 December 2024)
16 December 2024
08.00 WIB

Roksi	2–2	Banjar Patroman
	Report

Inspire Arena, West Bandung
16 December 2024
10.00 WIB

Parma	0–0	PLG Parahyangan
	Report

Inspire Arena, West Bandung

=== Group C ===
All matches will be held at Inspire Arena, West Bandung.

Pos	Team	Pld	W	D	L	GF	GA	GD	Pts	Qualification	TAS	BRT	SUP	RAN	MBD
1	Persikotas	4	4	0	0	17	0	+17	12	Qualification to the Knockout round	—	—	1–0	—	7–0
2	BRT Subang	4	2	0	2	11	5	+6	6 (Note: Tied on head-to-head points. Ranked on head-to-head goal difference: BRT Subang +2, Super Progresif +1, Rancaekek –3.)	Qualification to the Knockout round	0–1	—	—	5–1	—
3	Super Progresif	4	2	0	2	6	4	+2	6	Qualification to the Knockout round	—	3–1	—	1–2	—
4	Rancaekek	4	2	0	2	6	14	−8	6		0–8	—	—	—	3–0
5	Maung Bandung	4	0	0	4	0	17	−17	0		—	0–5	0–2	—	—

Source: Series 2
Legend: Blue = home team win; Yellow = draw; Red = away team win.
Rules for classification: 1) Points; 2) Head-to-head points; 3) Head-to-head goal difference; 4) Head-to-head goals scored; 5) Goal difference; 6) Goals scored; 7) Fair-play points; 8) Draw.
Notes:

Matches

Matchday 1 (6 December 2024)
6 December 2024
13.00 WIB

BRT Subang	5–1	Rancaekek
	Report

Inspire Arena, West Bandung
6 December 2024
15.00 WIB

Persikotas	7–0	Maung Bandung
	Report

Inspire Arena, West Bandung

Matchday 2 (9 December 2024)
9 December 2024
08.00 WIB

Super Progresif	3–1	BRT Subang
	Report

Inspire Arena, West Bandung
9 December 2024
10.00 WIB

Rancaekek	0–8	Persikotas
	Report

Inspire Arena, West Bandung

Matchday 3 (11 December 2024)
11 December 2024
13.00 WIB

Maung Bandung	0–2	Super Progresif
	Report

Inspire Arena, West Bandung
11 December 2024
15.00 WIB

BRT Subang	0–1	Persikotas
	Report

Inspire Arena, West Bandung

Matchday 4 (13 December 2024)
13 December 2024
07.30 WIB

Super Progresif	1–2	Rancaekek
	Report

Inspire Arena, West Bandung
13 December 2024
09.30 WIB

Maung Bandung	0–5	BRT Subang
	Report

Inspire Arena, West Bandung

Matchday 5 (16 December 2024)
16 December 2024
13.00 WIB

Rancaekek	3–0	Maung Bandung
	Report

Inspire Arena, West Bandung
16 December 2024
15.00 WIB

Persikotas	1–0	Super Progresif
	Report

Inspire Arena, West Bandung

=== Group D ===
All matches will be held at Pusdikpom Soegiri Infini Arena, Pusdik Armed Field in Cimahi and Idjon Djanbi Field in West Bandung.

Pos	Team	Pld	W	D	L	GF	GA	GD	Pts	Qualification	PAT	BEN	PKA	BUN	BUA
1	Patriot Bekasi	4	4	0	0	22	2	+20	12	Qualification to the Knockout round	—	6–2	—	8–0	—
2	Benpica	4	2	1	1	7	7	0	7	Qualification to the Knockout round	—	—	0–0	—	3–0 (Note: The match was awarded as a 3–0 victory to Benpica, after Buaran Putra did not send their team for the match.)
3	Persika	4	1	2	1	4	6	−2	5	Qualification to the Knockout round	0–5	—	—	—	3–0 (Note: The match was awarded as a 3–0 victory to Persika, after Buaran Putra did not send their team for the match.)
4	Bekasi United	4	1	1	2	5	11	−6	4		—	1–2	1–1	—	—
5	Buaran Putra	4	0	0	4	0	12	−12	0		0–3 (Note: The match was awarded as a 3–0 victory to Patriot Bekasi, after Buaran Putra did not send their team for the match.)	—	—	0–3 (Note: The match was awarded as a 3–0 victory to Bekasi United, after Buaran Putra did not send their team for the match.)	—

Source: Series 2
Legend: Blue = home team win; Yellow = draw; Red = away team win.
Rules for classification: 1) Points; 2) Head-to-head points; 3) Head-to-head goal difference; 4) Head-to-head goals scored; 5) Goal difference; 6) Goals scored; 7) Fair-play points; 8) Draw.
Notes:

Matches

Matchday 1 (5 December 2024)
5 December 2024
13.00 WIB

Persika	3–0 Awarded (Note: The match was awarded as a 3–0 victory to Persika, after Buaran Putra did not send their team for the match.)	Buaran Putra
	Report

Pusdikpom Soegiri Infini Arena, Cimahi
5 December 2024
15.00 WIB

Patriot Bekasi	8–0	Bekasi United
	Report

Pusdikpom Soegiri Infini Arena, Cimahi

Matchday 2 (7 December 2024)
7 December 2024
13.00 WIB

Benpica	0–0	Persika
	Report

Idjon Djanbi Field, West Bandung
7 December 2024
15.00 WIB

Buaran Putra	0–3 Awarded (Note: The match was awarded as a 3–0 victory to Patriot Bekasi, after Buaran Putra did not send their team for the match.)	Patriot Bekasi

Pusdikpom Soegiri Infini Arena, Cimahi

Matchday 3 (12 December 2024)
12 December 2024
08.00 WIB

Bekasi United	1–2	Benpica
	Report

Pusdikpom Soegiri Infini Arena, Cimahi
12 December 2024
10.00 WIB

Persika	0–5	Patriot Bekasi
	Report

Pusdikpom Soegiri Infini Arena, Cimahi

Matchday 4 (14 December 2024)
14 December 2024
08.00 WIB

Benpica	3–0 Awarded (Note: The match was awarded as a 3–0 victory to Benpica, after Buaran Putra did not send their team for the match.)	Buaran Putra

Pusdikpom Soegiri Infini Arena, Cimahi
14 December 2024
10.00 WIB

Bekasi United	1–1	Persika
	Report

Pusdik Armed Field, Cimahi

Matchday 5 (16 December 2024)
16 December 2024
13.00 WIB

Buaran Putra	0–3 Awarded (Note: The match was awarded as a 3–0 victory to Bekasi United, after Buaran Putra did not send their team for the match.)	Bekasi United

Pusdikpom Soegiri Infini Arena, Cimahi
16 December 2024
15.00 WIB

Patriot Bekasi	6–2	Benpica

Pusdikpom Soegiri Infini Arena, Cimahi

=== Group E ===
All matches will be held at Pusdikpom Soegiri Infini Arena, Cimahi and Idjon Djanbi Field, West Bandung.

Pos	Team	Pld	W	D	L	GF	GA	GD	Pts	Qualification	IND	DUN	PAK	GRY
1	Indramayu United	3	2	1	0	5	3	+2	7	Qualification to the Knockout round	—	1–1	—	3–2
2	Depok United	3	1	2	0	4	3	+1	5	Qualification to the Knockout round	—	—	—	2–1
3	Pakuan City	3	1	1	1	5	2	+3	4		0–1	1–1	—	—
4	Gemilang Raya	3	0	0	3	3	9	−6	0		—	—	0–4	—

Source: Series 2
Legend: Blue = home team win; Yellow = draw; Red = away team win.
Rules for classification: 1) Points; 2) Head-to-head points; 3) Head-to-head goal difference; 4) Head-to-head goals scored; 5) Goal difference; 6) Goals scored; 7) Fair-play points; 8) Draw.

Matches

Matchday 1 (7 December 2024)
7 December 2024
08.00 WIB

Pakuan City	0–1	Indramayu United
	Report

Idjon Djanbi Field, West Bandung
7 December 2024
10.00 WIB

Depok United	2–1	Gemilang Raya
	Report

Idjon Djanbi Field, West Bandung

Matchday 2 (10 December 2024)
10 December 2024
13.00 WIB

Indramayu United	1–1	Depok United
	Report

Pusdikpom Soegiri Infini Arena, Cimahi
10 December 2024
15.00 WIB

Gemilang Raya	0–4	Pakuan City
	Report

Pusdikpom Soegiri Infini Arena, Cimahi

Matchday 3 (13 December 2024)
13 December 2024
07.30 WIB

Pakuan City	1–1	Depok United
	Report

Pusdikpom Soegiri Infini Arena, Cimahi
13 December 2024
09.30 WIB

Indramayu United	3–2	Gemilang Raya
	Report

Pusdikpom Soegiri Infini Arena, Cimahi

=== Group F ===
All matches will be held at Pusdikpom Soegiri Infini Arena, Cimahi.

Pos	Team	Pld	W	D	L	GF	GA	GD	Pts	Qualification	EAS	KAD	BGD	RCK
1	EASGA	3	2	0	1	4	2	+2	6 (Note: Tied on head-to-head points. Ranked on head-to-head goal difference: EASGA +1, Persikad 1999 0, Bojong Gede Raya –1.)	Qualification to the Knockout round	—	0–1	—	1–0
2	Persikad 1999	3	2	0	1	3	1	+2	6	Qualification to the Knockout round	—	—	0–1	—
3	Bojong Gede Raya	3	2	0	1	5	3	+2	6		1–3	—	—	—
4	RCK Nusantara	3	0	0	3	0	6	−6	0		—	0–2	0–3	—

Source: Series 2
Legend: Blue = home team win; Yellow = draw; Red = away team win.
Rules for classification: 1) Points; 2) Head-to-head points; 3) Head-to-head goal difference; 4) Head-to-head goals scored; 5) Goal difference; 6) Goals scored; 7) Fair-play points; 8) Draw.
Notes:

Matches

Matchday 1 (6 December 2024)
6 December 2024
07.30 WIB

Persikad 1999	0–1	Bojong Gede Raya
	Report

Pusdikpom Soegiri Infini Arena, Cimahi
6 December 2024
09.30 WIB

EASGA	1–0	RCK Nusantara
	Report

Pusdikpom Soegiri Infini Arena, Cimahi

Matchday 2 (10 December 2024)
10 December 2024
08.00 WIB

RCK Nusantara	0–2	Persikad 1999
	Report

Pusdikpom Soegiri Infini Arena, Cimahi
10 December 2024
10.00 WIB

Bojong Gede Raya	1–3	EASGA
	Report

Pusdikpom Soegiri Infini Arena, Cimahi

Matchday 3 (12 December 2024)
12 December 2024
13.00 WIB

EASGA	0–1	Persikad 1999
	Report

Pusdikpom Soegiri Infini Arena, Cimahi
12 December 2024
15.00 WIB

RCK Nusantara	0–3	Bojong Gede Raya
	Report

Pusdikpom Soegiri Infini Arena, Cimahi

== Knockout round ==
The knockout round will be played as a single match. If tied after regulation time, extra time and, if necessary, a penalty shoot-out will be used to decide the winning team. The semi-finalists will be promoted to the 2025–26 Liga 4 West Java Series 1.

=== Bracket ===
Round of 16
19 December 2024 – Bandung
A1	Maung Anom	1
B3	Roksi	0
19 December 2024 – Bandung
C1	Persikotas	1
D3	Persika	0
20 December 2024 – Bandung
E1	Indramayu United	0
F2	Persikad 1999	3
20 December 2024 – Bandung
A2	Riverside Forest	2
B2	PLG Parahyangan	1
21 December 2024 – Bandung
B1	Parma	1 (6)
A3	Bandung Barat United (p)	1 (7)
21 December 2024 – Bandung
D1	Patriot Bekasi	2
C3	Super Progresif	0
22 December 2024 – Bandung
F1	EASGA (p)	2 (5)
E2	Depok United	2 (4)
22 December 2024 – Bandung
C2	BRT Subang	3
D2	Benpica	2

Quarter-finals
23 December 2024 – Bandung
Maung Anom	1
Persikotas	2
23 December 2024 – Bandung
Persikad 1999	2
Riverside Forest	1
24 December 2024 – Bandung
Bandung Barat United	0
Patriot Bekasi	2
24 December 2024 – Bandung
EASGA	1
BRT Subang	0

Semi-finals
26 December 2024 – Bandung
Persikotas	0
Persikad 1999	1
26 December 2024 – Bandung
Patriot Bekasi	1
EASGA	0

Final
28 December 2024 – Cimahi
Persikad 1999	2 (4)
Patriot Bekasi (p)	2 (5)
Third place play-off
28 December 2024 – Cimahi
Persikotas (p)	0 (4)
EASGA	0 (3)

=== Round of 16 ===
19 December 2024
08.20 WIB

Maung Anom	1–0	Roksi
	Report

SOR Lodaya Field, Bandung

19 December 2024
10.20 WIB

Persikotas	1–0	Persika
	Report

SOR Lodaya Field, Bandung

20 December 2024
08.30 WIB

Indramayu United	0–3	Persikad 1999
	Report

SOR Lodaya Field, Bandung

20 December 2024
13.30 WIB

Riverside Forest	2–1	PLG Parahyangan
	Report

SOR Lodaya Field, Bandung

21 December 2024
08.20 WIB

Parma	1–1	Bandung Barat United
	Report
Penalties
	6–7

SOR Lodaya Field, Bandung

21 December 2024
10.20 WIB

Patriot Bekasi	2–0	Super Progresif
	Report

SOR Lodaya Field, Bandung

22 December 2024
08.20 WIB

EASGA	2–2	Depok United
	Report
Penalties
	5–4

SOR Lodaya Field, Bandung

22 December 2024
10.20 WIB

BRT Subang	3–2	Benpica
	Report

SOR Lodaya Field, Bandung

=== Quarter-finals ===
The winner will be promoted to the 2025–26 Liga 4 West Java Series 1.

23 December 2024
08.20 WIB

Maung Anom	1–2	Persikotas
	Report

SOR Lodaya Field, Bandung

23 December 2024
10.20 WIB

Persikad 1999	2–1	Riverside Forest
	Report

SOR Lodaya Field, Bandung

24 December 2024
08.20 WIB

Bandung Barat United	0–2	Patriot Bekasi
	Report

SOR Lodaya Field, Bandung

24 December 2024
10.20 WIB

EASGA	1–0	BRT Subang
	Report

SOR Lodaya Field, Bandung

=== Semi-finals ===
26 December 2024
08.00 WIB

Persikotas	0–1	Persikad 1999
	Report

Sidolig Stadium, Bandung

26 December 2024
10.00 WIB

Patriot Bekasi	1–0	EASGA
	Report

Sidolig Stadium, Bandung

=== Third place play-off ===
28 December 2024
08.00 WIB

Persikotas	0–0	EASGA
Penalties
	4–3

Pusdik Armed Field, Cimahi

=== Final ===
28 December 2024
10.00 WIB

Persikad 1999	2–2	Patriot Bekasi
Penalties
	4–5

Pusdik Armed Field, Cimahi

== See also ==
- 2024–25 Liga 4 West Java Series 1
