= Mahakam Stadium =

Football stadium in West Java, Indonesia

- Stadion Mahakam
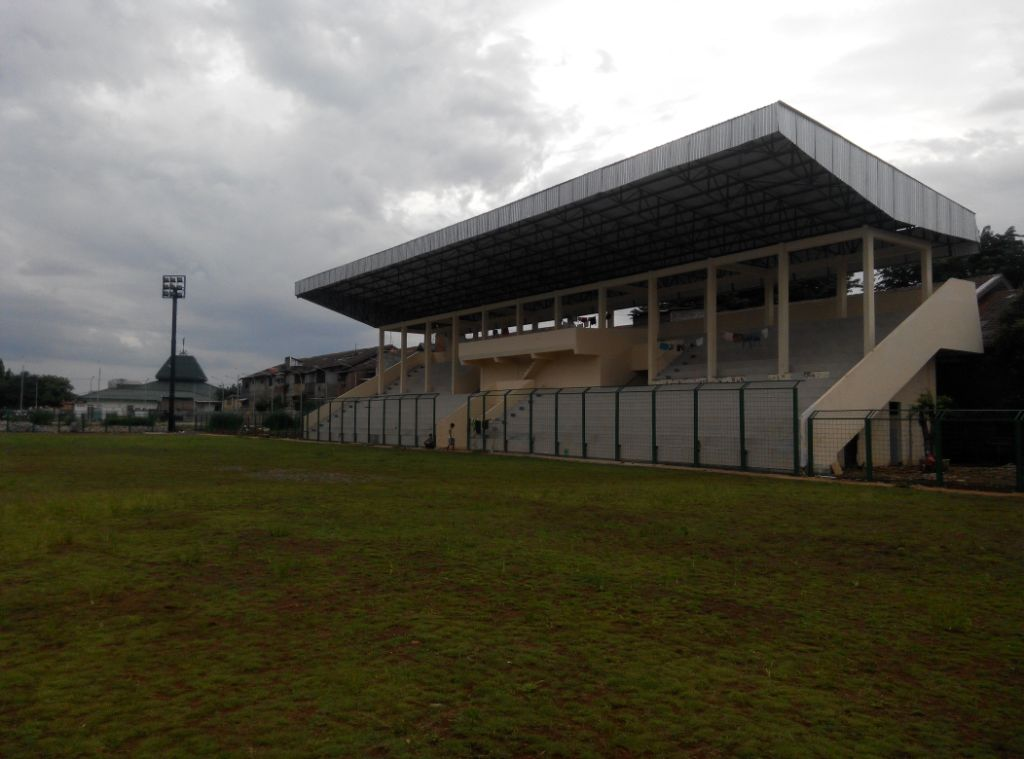

- Location in Depok location in Java Location in Indonesia
- Address: Jalan Rasamala, Sukmajaya, Bakti Jaya, Sukmajaya, Depok, West Java; Indonesia
- Coordinates: 6°23′7″S 106°50′50″E
- Owner: Government of Depok City
- Operator: Government of Depok City
- Capacity: 4,000
- Surface: Grass field

Construction
- Built: N/A
- Renovated: 2016–2017
- Expanded: 2016–2017
- Closed: 2016–2017
- Cost: Rp 9,400,000,000

Tenant
- Depok United (2012–present)

Mahakam Stadium is the second-largest stadium in the city of Depok. It is home to Depok United and is still under construction.

== Matches ==
Date	Time (UTC+7)	Team 1	Score	Team 2	Match
4 February 2017	15:00	Persikad Depok	8 – 1	Perintis	Friendly
