= Baksa kembang =

Indonesian traditional dance

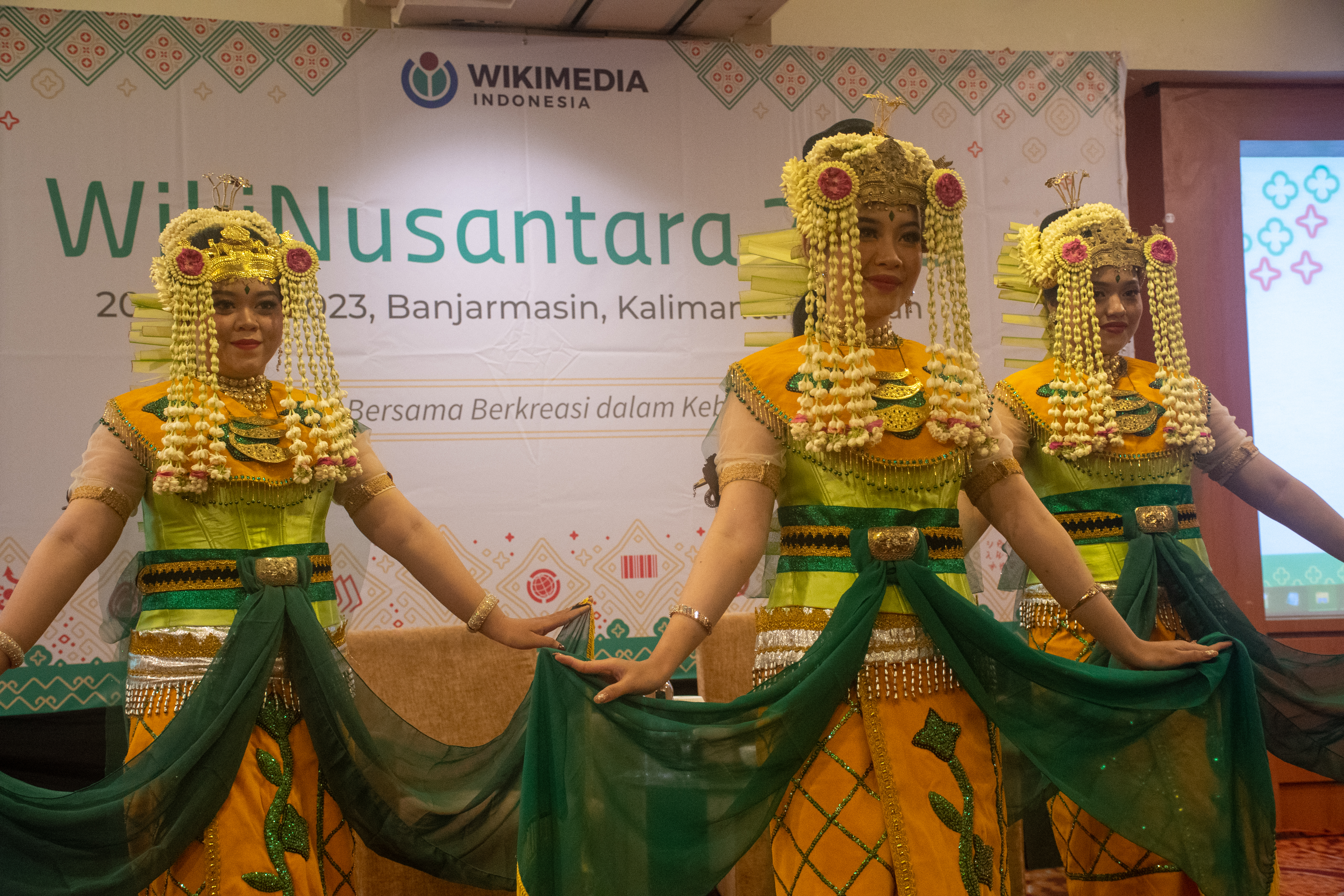
- Baksa kembang during the opening of a wiki conference in Banjarmasin, Indonesia
- Native name: Tari Baksa kembang (Indonesian)
- Genre: Traditional dance
- Instrument(s): Gamelan, Gong, Kendhang
- Inventor: Banjarese
- Origin: Indonesia

Baksa Kembang is one of the classical Banjar dances originating from South Kalimantan, Indonesia, which functions as a welcoming dance (Tari Selamat datang) for guests. This dance is usually played by female dancers with the condition that the number of dancers must be odd.

Baksa Kembang was originally a dance that was only performed in the royal environment to welcome guests of honor or royal relatives. However, along with developments, this dance became popular in the community when the Sultanate of Banjar began to open access for the public to watch this dance performance. Thus, the Baksa kembang became popular in the community and became one of the regional cultures in South Kalimantan.

== Performance ==
Baksa Kembang dancers are equipped with a scarf (selendang) that is used to dance so that when dancing they look elegant and charming. One of the characteristics of the Baksa Kembang dance costume is the crown on its head called the gajah gemuling, which is a crown decorated with two small bogam flowers and woven young coconut leaves which are often called halilipan.

The movements in this dance depict like beautiful teenage girls playing in a flower garden. They picked some flowers which were then arranged into Bougainvillea (Bogam) flowers and they carried them while dancing gracefully and beautifully. In the show, the dancers carry a pair of bogam flowers in their hands, namely a series of roses, jasmine, Magnolia × alba (kantil) and Cananga odorata (ylang flowers). This bogan flower will be presented to guests who come after the dance is finished.

Baksa Kembang Movement
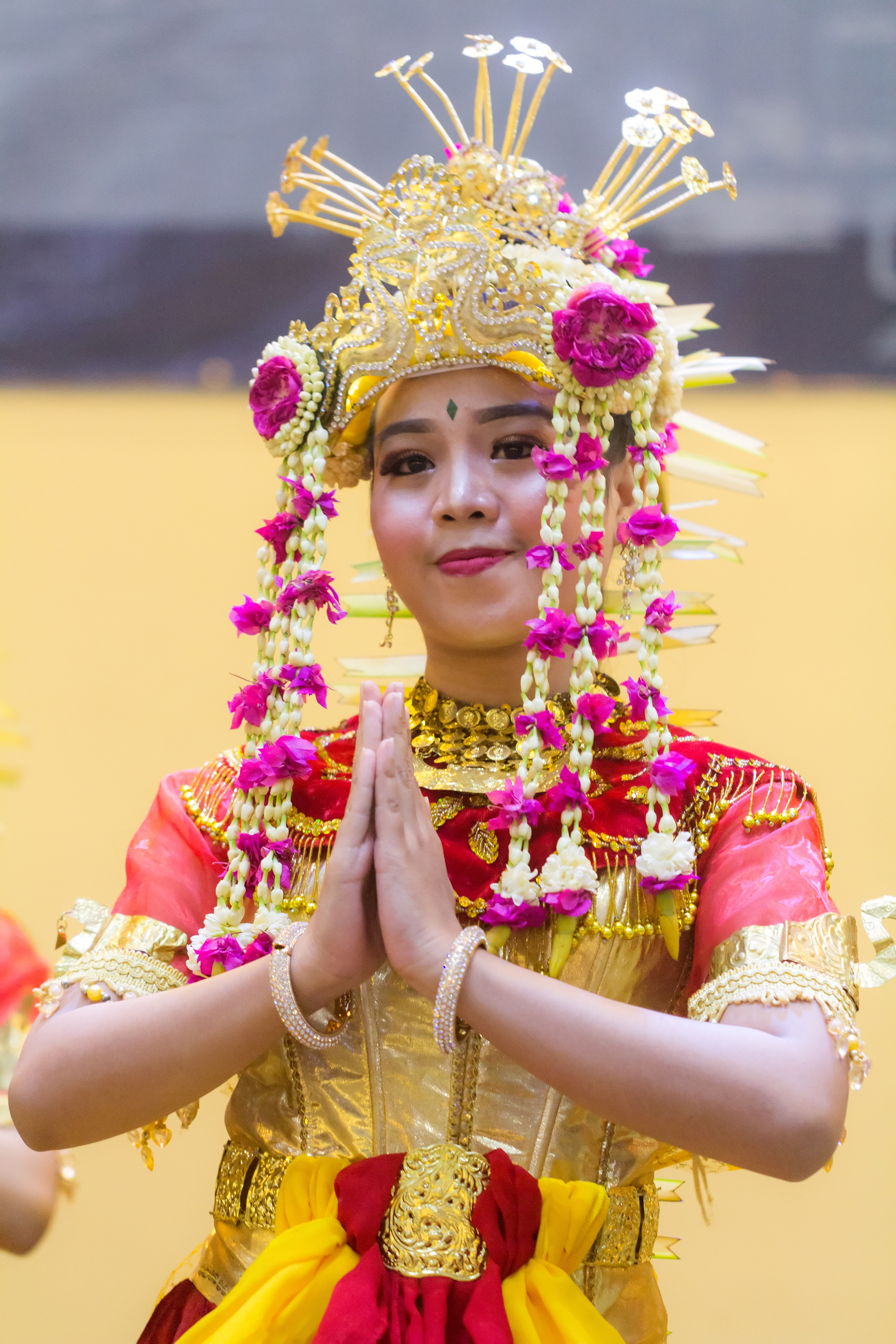
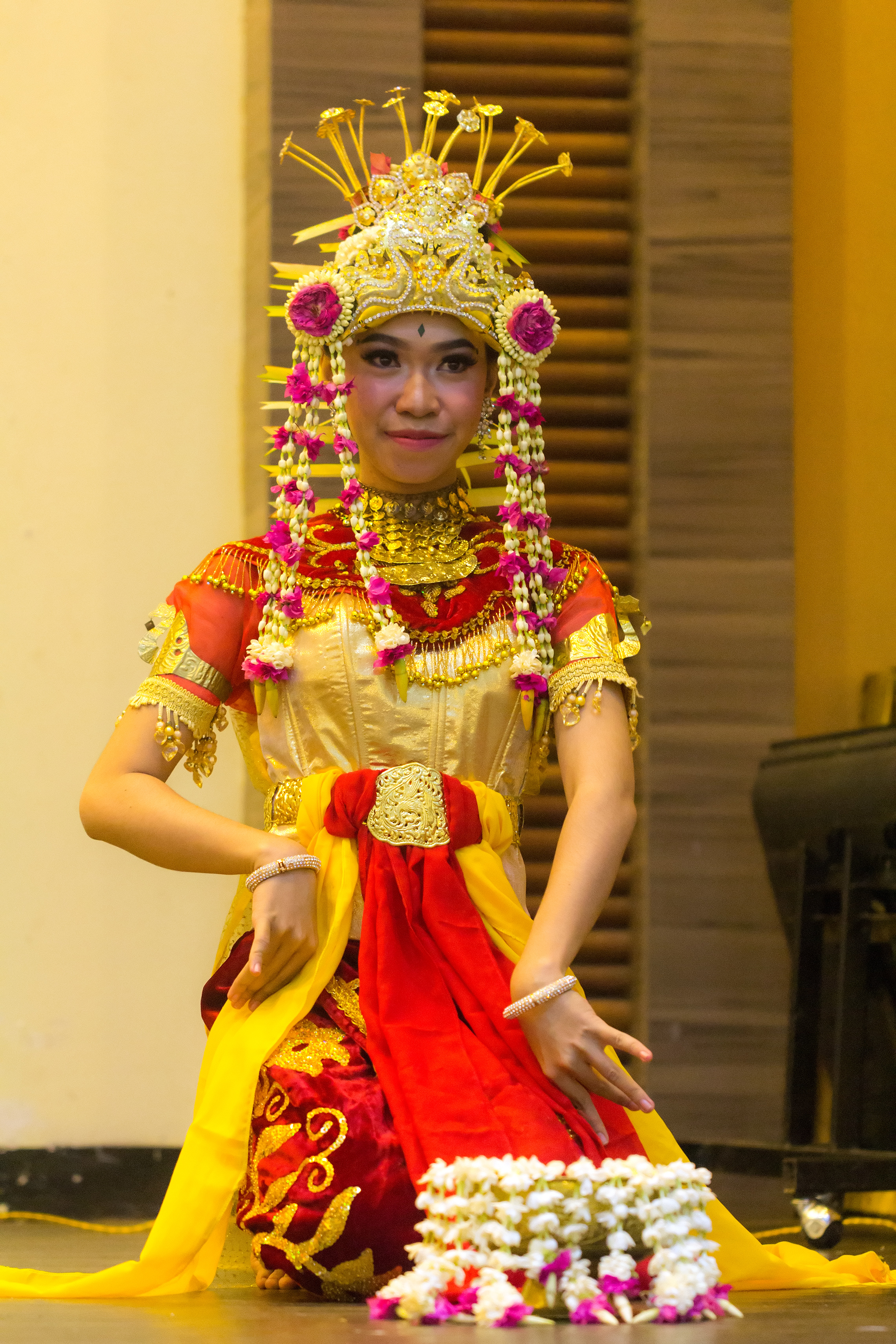
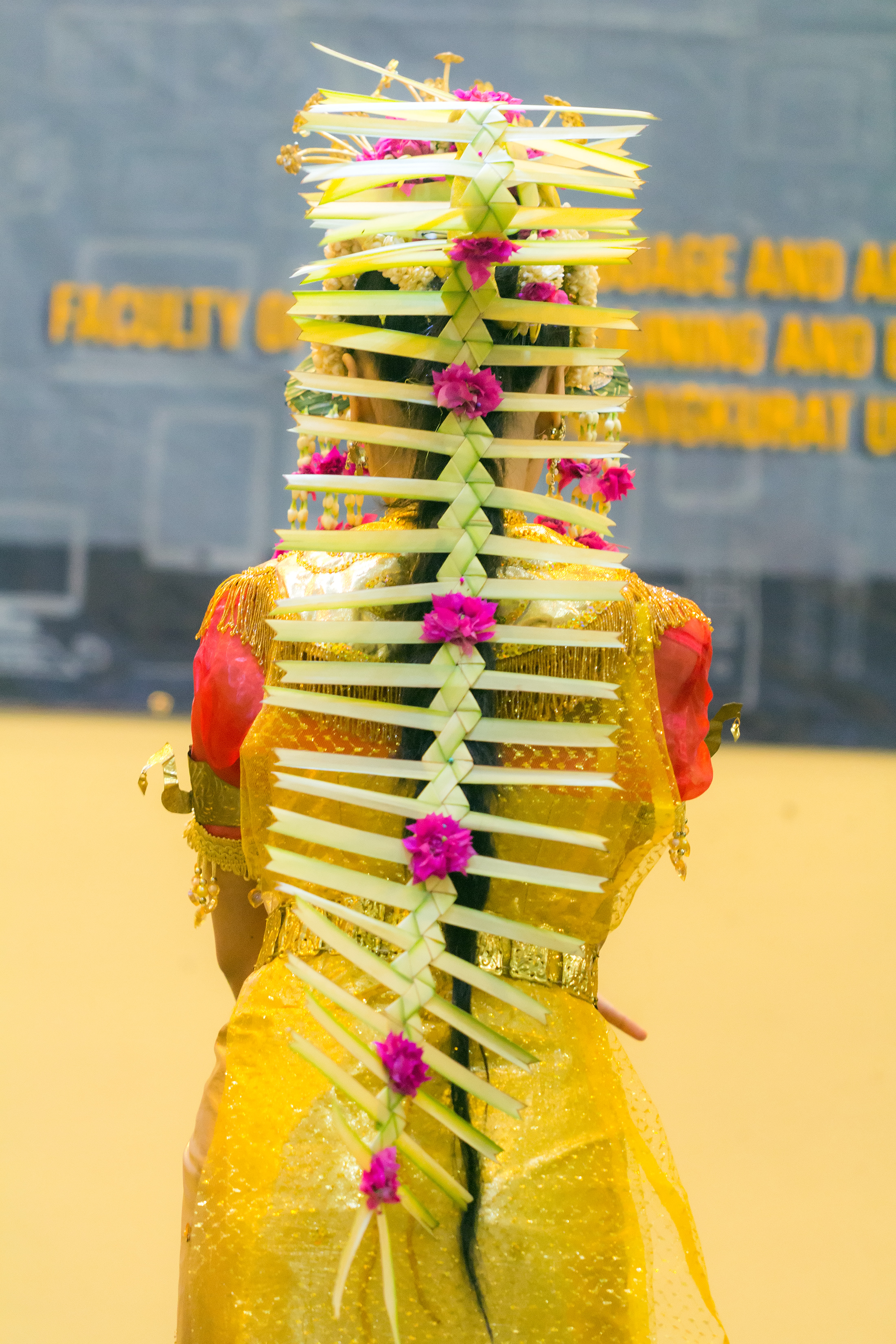
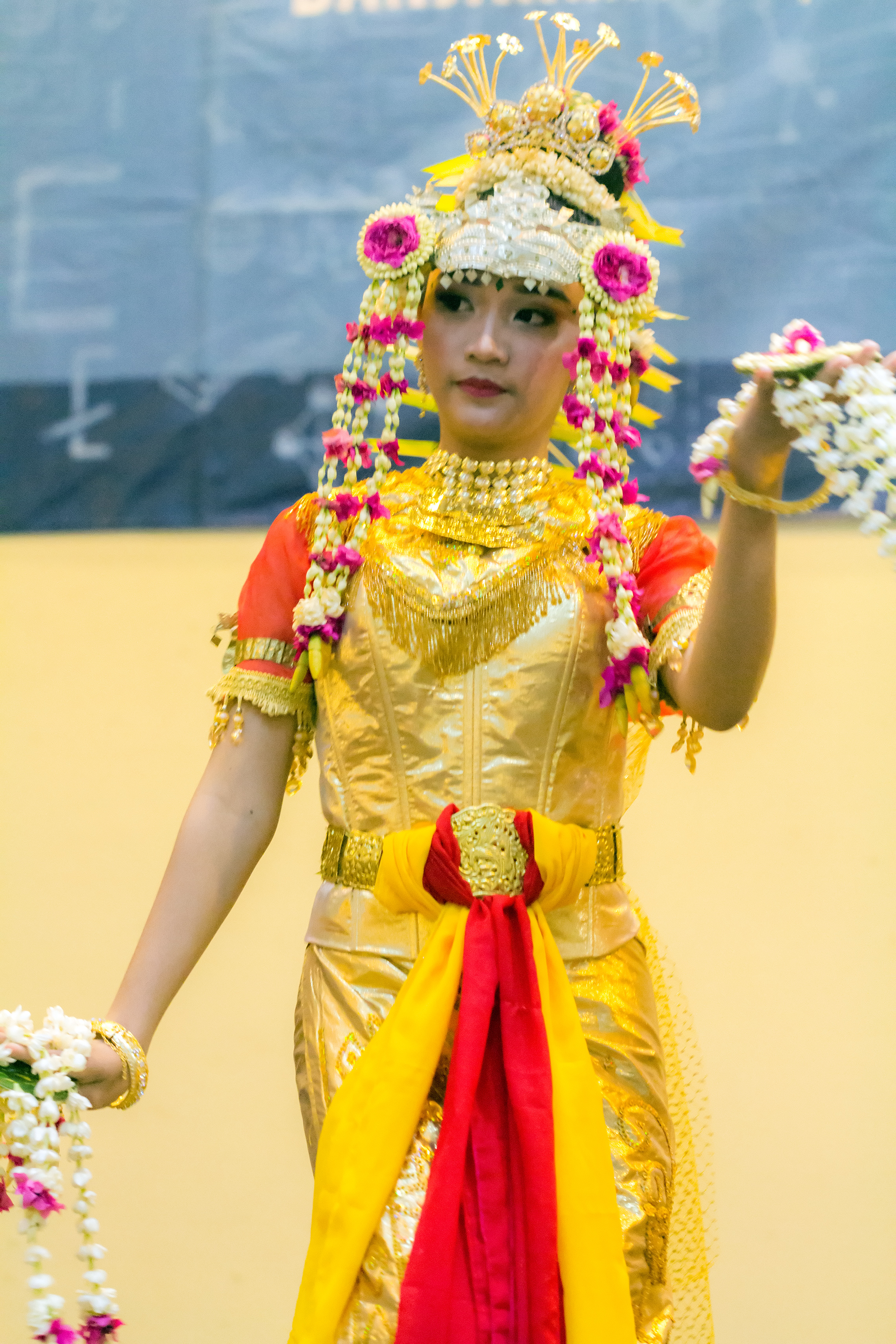

== Today ==
Baksa Kembang dance can now be found at various welcoming events, traditional events and cultural festivals in South Kalimantan. Along with the development, many creations are added in each of these dance performances, for example in the creation of clothing or additional movements. This is done as a preservation of this art and so that the performances that are presented look attractive.

== See also ==
- Srimpi
- Gambyong
- Gending Sriwijaya
- Dance in Indonesia
