= Perkesit Cianjur =

Indonesian football club

- Full name: Persatoean Kesebelasan Indonesia Tjianjoer
- Nicknames: Badak Bodas (White Rhinos)
- Founded: 1953; 73 years ago
- Ground: Badak Putih Stadium; Cianjur, West Java
- Capacity: 5,000
- Owner: Yayasan Perkesit Tjianjoer Djawara
- Manager: Ade Sumardi
- Coach: Alfi Fauzi Kamil
- League: Liga 4
- 2024–25: 5th, in Group D (West Java zone)
Home colours	Away colours

Persatoean Kesebelasan Indonesia Tjianjoer (simply known as a Perkesit) is an Indonesian football club based in Cianjur Regency, West Java that competes in Liga 4. Their home base is Badak Putih Stadium.

== History ==
In the 2004 Liga Indonesia Second Division, Perkesit played in the West Java zone in Group D which took place at the Persikas Stadium, Subang Regency. The club joined together with the Pemda Jabar, Persikas Subang as the host, and Perssi Sukabumi. With a result, Perkesit had to be at the bottom of Group D with 3 defeats.

After a long time without any achievements in official events, Perkesit managed to become the champion of the 2023 Liga 3 West Java Series 2 with an impressive record, they were undefeated throughout the competition. In the final match, they defeated Cimahi United. The match took place at Siliwangi Stadium, Bandung City, on Wednesday, 22 November 2023 with a score of 1–0.

== Honours ==
- Liga 3 West Java Series 2
  - Champion (1): 2023
