= Bima Stadium =

Football stadium in Cirebon, Indonesia

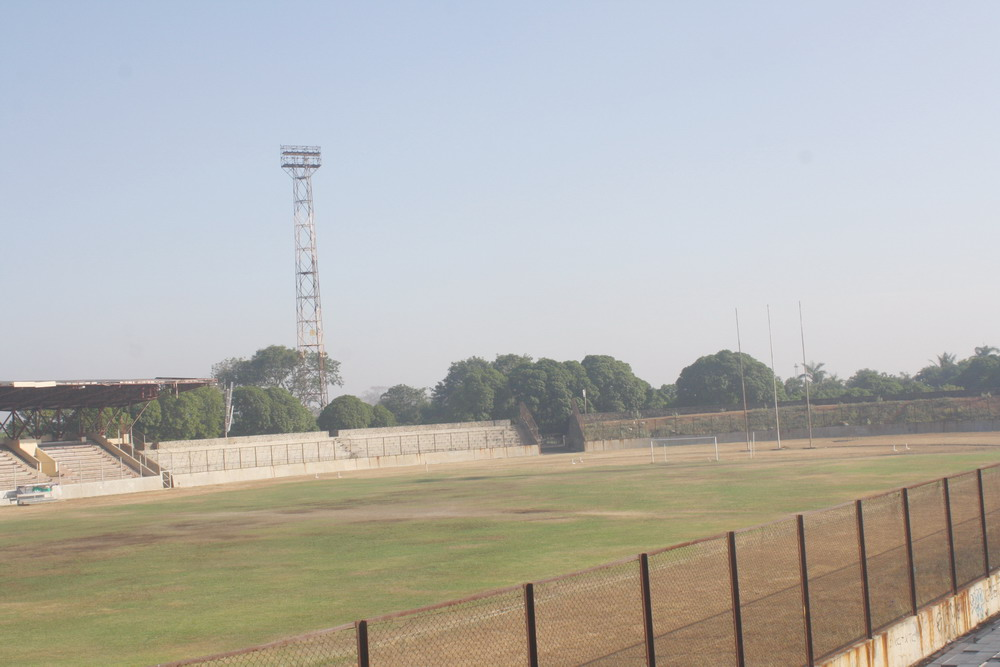
- Bima Stadium

- Location in Java
- Location: Cirebon, West Java, Indonesia
- Coordinates: 6°42′26″S 108°33′27″E
- Owner: Government of Cirebon Municipalities
- Operator: Government of Cirebon Municipalities
- Capacity: 15,000
- Surface: Grass field

Construction
- Built: 1972
- Opened: 1972
- Renovated: 2017

Tenants
- PSIT Cirebon; Indocement Cirebon; PS Gunung Jati Cirebon

Bima Stadium is the name of a football stadium in the city of Cirebon, West Java, Indonesia. It was named after Bhima, a figure in the Mahabharata is used as the home venue for PSIT Cirebon and PS Gunung Jati Cirebon. The stadium has a capacity of 15,000. The stadium was built in 1972.
