= Bogor Raya F.C. =

Indonesian football club

Bogor Raya
- Full name: Bogor Raya Football Club
- Nicknames: Laskar Kujang (Kujang Warriors)
- Founded: 29 October 2010; 15 years ago 2025; 1 year ago (refounded)
- Ground: Pajajaran Stadium
- Capacity: 12,000
- Coach: M. Qodrad Maulana
- League: Liga 4
Home colours	Away colours

Bogor Raya Football Club is an Indonesian football club based in Bogor City, West Java. The club competes in the Liga 4 West Java Series 2, after years of absence from Indonesian football league system.

== Season-by-season records ==
Season	League	Tms.	Pos.	Piala Indonesia
Old Bogor Raya
2011	Liga Primer Indonesia	19	13th	—
New Bogor Raya (refounded)
2025–26	Liga 4 (West Java Series 2)	47	1st	—
2026–27	Liga 4		TBD	—

Champion	Runner-up	Promotion	Relegation

== Supporters ==
Bogor Raya has a supporter base called Boraholic (Bogor Raya Hooligan Fanatic) and Boramania (Bogor Raya Mania).

== Honours ==
- Liga 4 West Java Series 2
  - Champions (1): 2025–26
