= Pandji =

Pandji may refer to:

- Panji tales
- Pandji Pragiwaksono
- Pandji Prawira
- Pandji Tisna
- Raden Pandji Chandra Pratomo Samiadji Massaid
