= Gending Sriwijaya =

Indonesian traditional performance (song, music, and dance)

Gending Srivijaya
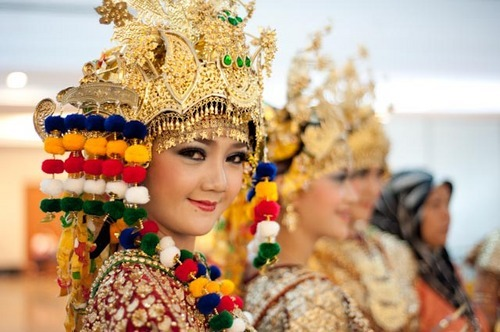
- The gilded costume of South Sumatran Gending Sriwijaya dance invoked the splendor of Srivijaya empire.
- Native name: Gending Sriwijaya
- Genre: Traditional dance
- Instrument(s): Gamelan, Gong
- Inventor: Palembangese
- Origin: Indonesia

Gending Sriwijaya is the name of the traditional performance whether it is a song, music, as well as dance that originated from Palembang, South Sumatra, Indonesia. Both of the song and the dance was created to describes the splendor, cultural refinement, glory and the grandeur of Srivijaya empire that once succeed on unifying the western parts of Indonesian archipelago and Malay world generally.

== Etymology ==
The word of Gending derived from the word in Javanese: ꦒꦼꦤ꧀ꦝꦶꦁ, romanized: gendhing which refers to the cengkok used in karawitan — the classical gamelan music and performance practice, it is later adapted in Malay and Indonesian languages which means "the song (of gamelan)". While the word of Sriwijaya refers to the empire of Srivijaya that once ruled the Maritime Southeast Asia, which the capital took place in present-day Palembang, South Sumatra, Indonesia. Thus, the Gending Sriwijaya can be roughly translated as "the performance of Srivijaya", which in fact, this Gending Sriwijaya performance (music, song, and dance) mainly tells or invokes the splendor of Srivijaya empire.

== History ==
Srwijaya Gending Dance began to be created since 1943 and was completed in 1944. This dance was created to fulfill the request of the government (Japanese occupation era) to the Information Bureau (Hatching) to create a dance and song to welcome guests who came to visit the Palembang Residency (now Province South Sumatra).

The creator of the dance motion (dance stylist), namely Tina Haji Gong and Sukadan A. Rozak, various concepts are sought and collected by taking elements of the existing Palembang traditional dance. While Sriwijaya's music or songs were created in 1943, precisely from October to December, by A. Dahlan Muhabat, a composer who also played the violin in the Berlian Bintang aristocratic group in Palembang. The song Gending Sriwijaya, is a combination of Sriwijaya Jaya's song, which was created by A. Dahlan M with the concept of Japanese songs. And for the song Poetry Gending Sriwijaya, it was created by Nungcik AR.

Sriwijaya Gending Dance is a guest welcoming dance from South Sumatra such as the Betel Dance.

== Gending Sriwijaya song lyrics ==
The first stanza is the original lyrics of the song, while the second stanza was added later.

Indonesian lyrics

Di kala ku merindukan keluhuran dulu kala
Kutembangkan nyanyi dari lagu Gending Sriwijaya
Dalam seni kunikmatkan lagi zaman bahagia
Kuciptakan kembali dari kandungan Maha Kala
Sriwijaya dengan Asrama Agung Sang Maha Guru
Tutur sabda Dharmapala Sakyakhirti Dharmakhirti
Berkumandang dari puncaknya Siguntang Maha Meru
Menaburkan tuntunan suci Gautama Buddha shakti

Borobudur candi pusaka di zaman Sriwijaya
Saksi luhur berdiri tegak kukuh sepanjang masa
Memasyurkan Indonesia di benua Asia
Melambangkan keagungan sejarah Nusa dan Bangsa
Taman Sari berjenjang emas perlak Shri Ksetra
Dengan kolam pualam bagai di Surga Indralaya
Taman Putri turunan Maharaja Syailendra
Mendendangkan nyanyi irama lagu Gending Sriwijaya

Literal English translation

When I am longing for the ancient nobleness
I will sing the song of Gending Sriwijaya
Through the performance art I will enjoy the happy times
Recreated from the womb of Maha Kala (god of time)
Srivijaya with the grand Ashram of the Maha Guru (the great guru)
With the noble words of Dharmapala Sakyakhirti Dharmakhirti
Resonate from the peak of mount Siguntang Maha Meru
Disseminate the holy guidance of sacred Gautama Buddha

Borobudur the heritage temple in Srivijayan era
Noble witness that stand up firm eternally
Elevated the fame of Indonesia in Asia
Symbolizing the historic grandeur of our homeland and nation
The palace garden tiered with gold linings Shri Ksetra
With marbled pool just like the Indralaya heaven (realm of the god Indra)
The garden of princesses, the daughter of Syailendra Maharaja
Sung the rhyme of Gending Sriwijaya song

== Gending Sriwijaya dance ==
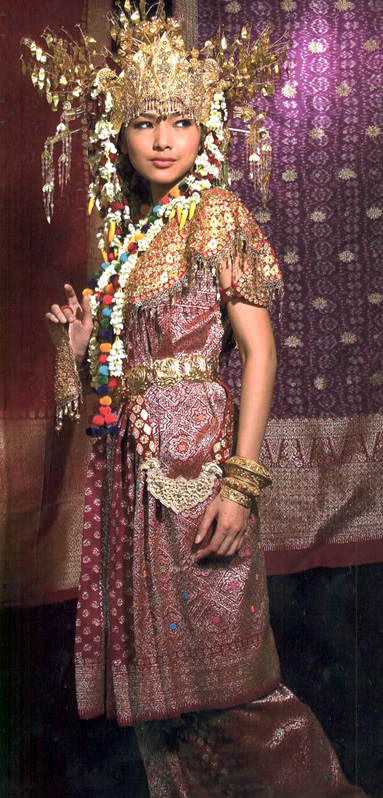
Songket-clad Aesan Gede costume, worn by prime lady in Gending Sriwijaya dance performance.

The Gending Sriwijaya dance is an Indonesian traditional dance from Palembang performed to honor and welcome the visiting special guests. The dance is often performed during state ceremonies, luncheons, dinner party or receptions, in front of the state's VIP guests, such as the head of state, president, king, queen and royal guests, minister and ambassador. For example, the Gending Sriwijaya dance was performed during annual Festival Sriwijaya in Palembang.

The dance is based on the simpler Tanggai dance, and believed as the reenactment and recreation of the original welcoming ceremony commonly found in traditional Malay courts in the region, which demonstrate the Sekapur Sirih (bersirih or menginang) ceremony that offering the honored guests the betel leaf, areca nut and slaked lime. The dance is believed to be originated from the court of Srivijaya, and presented to describe the host's welcoming hospitality, friendliness, happiness, and sincerity, as well as to demonstrate the beauty, gracefulness and cultured refinement of Srivijayan court.

The dance is performed by nine young and beautiful women, wearing glittering songket-clad traditional costumes called Aesan Gede, completed with Selendang Mantri, Paksangkong and Dodot, and also wearing Tanggai gilded jewelry. It is believed that the dance costume combine various cultural influences, notably Malay, Javanese and Chinese elements. These women represent the princesses of Srivijaya, and are guarded by two Pengawal male dancers holding yellow parasols and gilded spears. In the background, a singer would sing the Gending Sriwijaya song during the dance performance, accompanied with gamelan and gongs musical ensemble. Today however, the live singer is often replaced by playing taped recorded music. The simpler version is usually performed without male guardians.

Among the nine female dancers, there is one main dancer that wears the most complete and elaborated jewelries and costume, and acts as the prime lady. In the dance choreography, the prime lady would be the center and the foremost dancer. She holds tepak container as the props of Sekapur Sirih ceremony, and presents betel leaf, areca nut, and slaked lime for the honored guest to enjoy. On her sides, two other female dancers bring pridon, the brass containers traditionally used as spit container after the guests chew the betel nut. Today, however, the honored guest is not required to actually chew and spit out the betel nut, just the simple gesture of receiving or touching the tepak or pekinangan props would be enough. The Sekapur Sirih ceremony originally was only performed by king's daughter, the princess of Srivijaya, accompanied by other princesses, noble young women, and dayang (ladies in waiting).

== See also ==
- Kebagh dance
- Melinting dance
- Baksa kembang
- Dance in Indonesia
