= Bandung Timur F.C. =

Association football team in Indonesia

Bandung Timur
- Full name: Bandung Timur Football Club
- Nicknames: Laskar Buaya Putih (White Crocodile Warriors)
- Short name: BTFC
- Founded: 2020; 6 years ago
- Ground: Sabilulungan Stadium; Bandung Regency, West Java
- Capacity: 2,000
- Owner: PSSI Bandung Regency
- Chairman: H. Uce Sudrajat
- Coach: Sigit Hermawan
- League: Liga 4
- 2024: 5th in Group A, (West Java zone series 2)
Home colours	Away colours

Bandung Timur Football Club, commonly known as Bandung Timur, is an Indonesian football club based in Bandung Regency, West Java. They currently compete in the Liga 4.
