= Inspire Arena =

Indoor arena in Incheon, South Korea

- 인스파이어 아레나
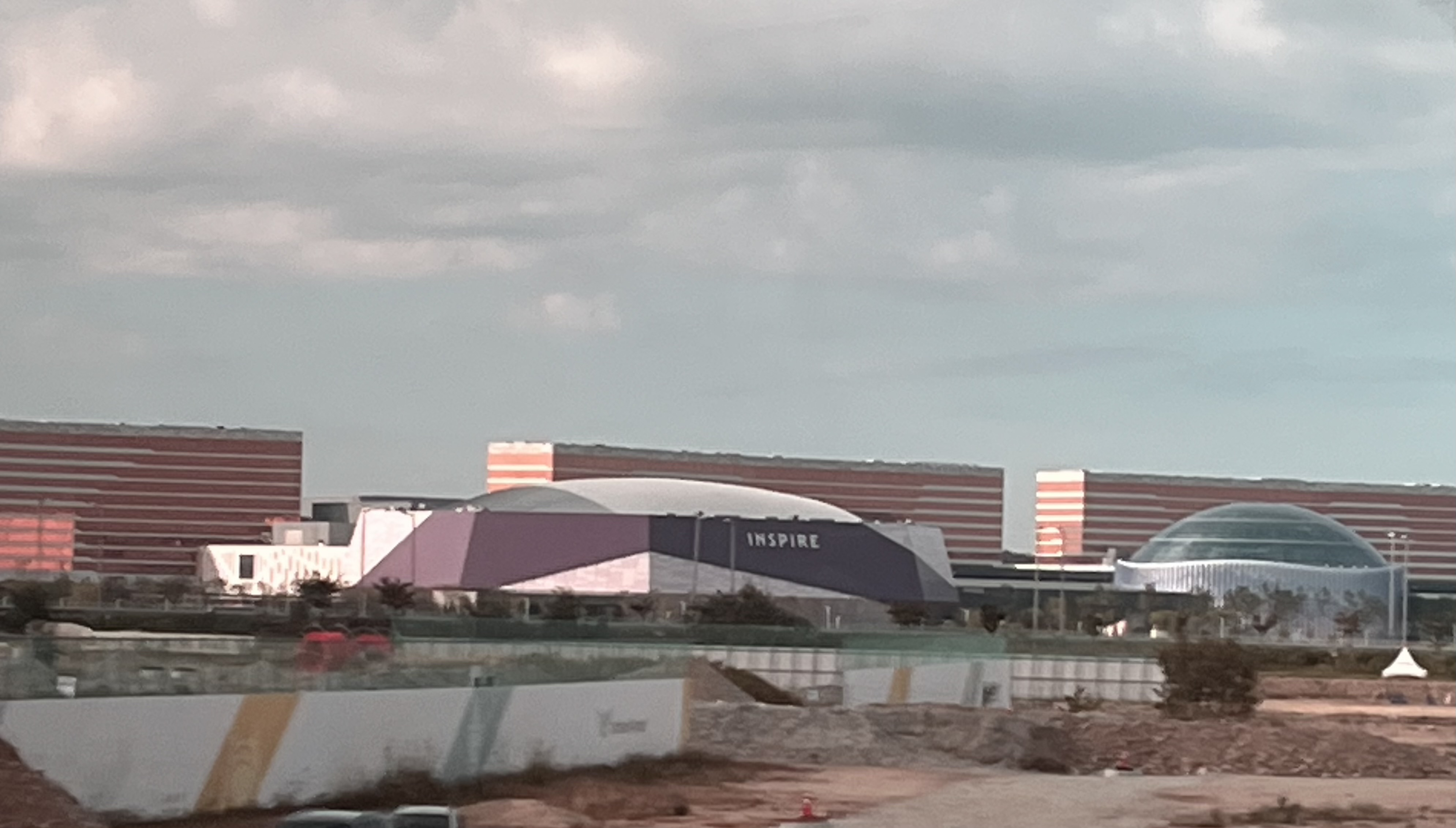
- Interactive map of Inspire Arena
- Address: 127 Gonghangmunhwa-ro, Yongyu-dong
- Location: Yeongjongdo, Jung District, Incheon, South Korea
- Coordinates: 37°28′00″N 126°23′26″E
- Owner: Mohegan Gaming & Entertainment
- Operator: Inspire Integrative Resort Co., Ltd.
- Capacity: 15,000

Construction
- Groundbreaking: May 2019
- Built: 2019–2023
- Opened: November 30, 2023
- Architect: Hetzel Design
- Structural engineer: Arup

Website
- Official website

The Inspire Arena (Korean: 인스파이어 아레나) is an indoor arena located in Incheon, South Korea, as part of the Mohegan Inspire Entertainment Resort, next to Incheon International Airport. It has a maximum total capacity of 15,000 depending on configuration.

The venue regularly hosts events such as music concerts, esports, fashion shows, sporting events, among others.

== Description ==
The Inspire Arena is owned and operated by the Mohegan Inspire Integrated Resort. The venue draws on the technology of the Mohegan Sun Arena located in Connecticut, United States. The Inspire Arena employs advanced architectural acoustic design techniques to optimize sound quality, as well as a Meyer Sound PA System designed to minimize sound distortion. The Inspire Arena is the largest purpose-built music venue in South Korea with a seating capacity exceeding 4,000, apart from venues built for sporting events such as the Olympic Gymnastics Arena and the Gocheok Sky Dome.

== Stage and capacity ==
The main stage of the arena can be adjusted into three layouts: a T-shaped stage with a capacity of 12,000 people, a circular stage completely surrounded by the audience in 360 degrees with a capacity of 15,000 people, and a normal linear stage. There are 19 sky boxes for VIPs.
