= Imran Soccer Academy =

Indonesian youth football academy

- Full name: Imran Soccer Academy
- Short name: ISA
- Founded: 2012; 14 years ago
- Ground: Letda Nasir Street, Nagrak, Gunung Putri, Bogor
- Owner: Zuchli Imran Putra
- Chairman: M. Daffa Imran
- League: Various youth development leagues
Home colours	Away colours

Imran Soccer Academy (also known as Diklat ISA) is an Indonesian youth football academy based in Bogor Regency, West Java. Founded in 2012 by lawyer Zuchli Imran Putra, the academy operates as a private football boarding school that focuses on youth character building, combining intensive football training with religious and moral education.

The academy is widely recognized for producing young talents who have gone on to play for the Indonesia national youth teams, the Garuda Select program, and various top-flight Super League professional clubs.

== History ==
Imran Soccer Academy was established in 2012 by Zuchli Imran Putra, an Indonesian lawyer and football enthusiast. Initially based in the Pesona Florence area of Kota Wisata in Ciangsana, the academy moved to a new professional-grade facility in December 2021 located on Letda Nasir Street in Nagrak, Gunung Putri, Bogor Regency.

The 2,500-square-meter base camp includes extensive student dormitories, a prayer hall (musalla), meeting rooms, and multiple sports areas, including a gym and table tennis facilities, mimicking the infrastructure of a professional football club. The academy's daily management is led by M. Daffa Imran, who serves as the academy president.

== International tournaments ==
Since its inception, Imran Soccer Academy has frequently represented Indonesia in prestigious youth international football tournaments across Europe and Australia.

- English Super Cup: In 2017, the academy's U-12 squad successfully won the English Super Cup title held in Manchester, United Kingdom. Upon returning to Indonesia, the squad was officially received and honored by the Indonesian Minister of Youth and Sports, Imam Nahrawi.
- Mediterranean International Cup (MIC): The academy competed multiple times in the prestigious Mediterranean International Cup in Catalonia, Spain, including the 2013, 2014, 2015, 2016, and 2022 editions. Their best performance came in 2014, when the U-14 category finished as the tournament's runners-up.
- Kanga Cup: In 2026, the academy U-15 team traveled to Canberra, Australia, to play in the Kanga Cup, advancing to the semi-final stage after defeating local youth academies such as Juventus Canberra and the Sporting Rovers.

== Notable alumni ==
Several Imran Soccer Academy alumni have successfully transitioned into professional youth careers, representing both Super League senior clubs and the Indonesian national youth selections, as well as other professional senior clubs:

- Kadek Arel
- Dony Tri Pamungkas
- Pandji Prawira
