= Maung Anom F.C. =

Association football team in Indonesia

Maung Anom
- Full name: Maung Anom Football Club
- Nicknames: Maung Ngora (The Young Tiger)
- Founded: 2017; 9 years ago
- Ground: Siliwangi Stadium
- Capacity: 25,000
- Owner: Diklat Persib
- Chairman: Teddy Tjahjono
- Manager: Arif Chandra Simanjuntak
- Coach: Cipta Adikodrati
- League: Liga 4
- 2024: Quarter-finals, (West Java zone series 2)
Home colours	Away colours

Maung Anom Football Club (simply known as Maung Anom) is an Indonesian football club based in Bandung, West Java. They currently compete in the Liga 4.

Founded in 2017 as Maung Anom Football Club, it is the reserve team of Persib Bandung besides the club Bandung United and currently plays in Liga 4, holding its home matches at the Siliwangi Stadium.
