= Pandji Prawira =

Indonesian footballer (born 2007)

Personal information
- Full name: Pandji Akbar Prawira
- Date of birth: 27 May 2007 (age 19)
- Place of birth: Tangerang, Indonesia
- Height: 1.69 m (5 ft 7 in)
- Position: Midfielder

Team information
- Current team: Iskra Krzęcin
- Number: 90

Youth career
- All Star Galapuri
- 2016–2024: Imran Soccer Academy
- 2022: RANS Nusantara U16
- 2023–2024: Madura United U16
- 2024: Wisła Kraków U19

Senior career*
Years	Team	Apps	(Gls)
2024–2025	Promień Przeginia		
2025–	Iskra Krzęcin		(2)
- * Club domestic league appearances and goals as of 13 October 2026

Pandji Akbar Prawira (born 27 May 2007) is an Indonesian footballer who plays as a midfielder for Klasa A club Iskra Krzęcin.

== Early career ==
Pandji initially trained in youth football with All Star Galapuri and had played in the Indonesia Junior League (IJL). Since 2016, he spent the early part of his youth career training at the Imran Soccer Academy (Diklat ISA) in Ciledug, Tangerang. During his time with the academy, he participated in several European youth tournaments, including the Mediterranean International Cup (MIC) in Spain and the Barcelona Football Festival in 2023, where he scored a goal in a 4–1 victory against Irish side Manortown United.

In domestic youth leagues, Pandji played for RANS Nusantara U16 in the 2022–23 Elite Pro Academy (EPA) Liga 1 U-16. The following season, he moved to Madura United U16 for the 2023–24 EPA Liga 1 U-16 campaign, where he made 15 appearances and recorded 1 goal against Persik Kediri U16.

== Club career ==
In 2024, Pandji moved to Poland to pursue a professional career, initially undergoing a training with the U19 squad of Ekstraklasa side Wisła Kraków. He later officially signed with Polish regional side Promień Przeginia.

Prior to the 2025–26 season, Pandji joined Iskra Krzęcin, competing in the Klasa A (the seventh tier of the Polish football league system). He managed to score two goals for the club in his debut season, notably netting against Opatkowianka Kraków.
