= Saint Prima F.C. =

Indonesian football club

Saint Prima
- Full name: Saint Prima Football Club
- Short name: SPFC
- Founded: 2005; 21 years ago
- Ground: Mengger Soccer Field
- Coach: Ahmad Mardziana
- League: Liga 4
- 2025–26: West Java zone (Series 2)
Home colours	Away colours

Saint Prima Football Club (commonly known as Saint Prima Bandung or Saint Prima Football Academy) is an Indonesian football club based in Bandung, West Java. The club serves as an official internal affiliate member under the multi-tiered club umbrella of Persib Bandung, alongside competing in regional amateur brackets such as the Liga 4.

== History ==
Founded in 2005, Saint Prima established its main academy operations at the Batununggal Indah complex in Mengger, Bandung. The organization structured its focus around grassroots athletic training following the national Filanesia curriculum framework, building a student cohort across multiple age brackets handled by certified licensed tacticians.

Historically, Saint Prima operated as one of the 36 accredited partner clubs within the Persib Bandung internal competition structure, regularly fielding youth squads to feed the city's primary athletic pipeline. In 2008, the club registered its first senior amateur tier rollout, debuting structurally within the national third division bracket.

The academy has recorded numerous regional tournament titles across junior categories, including securing the regional SEAFT Mayor of Bandung Cup championship at the Lodaya Field in January 2023. In June 2026, under head coach Ahmad Mardziana, the club's representative youth players were integrated into the Bandung All-Star roster selected to play international matches in Japan.

== Head coaches ==
- (Indonesia) Ahmad Mardziana (2025–present)
