= Kebagh dance =

Indonesian traditional dance

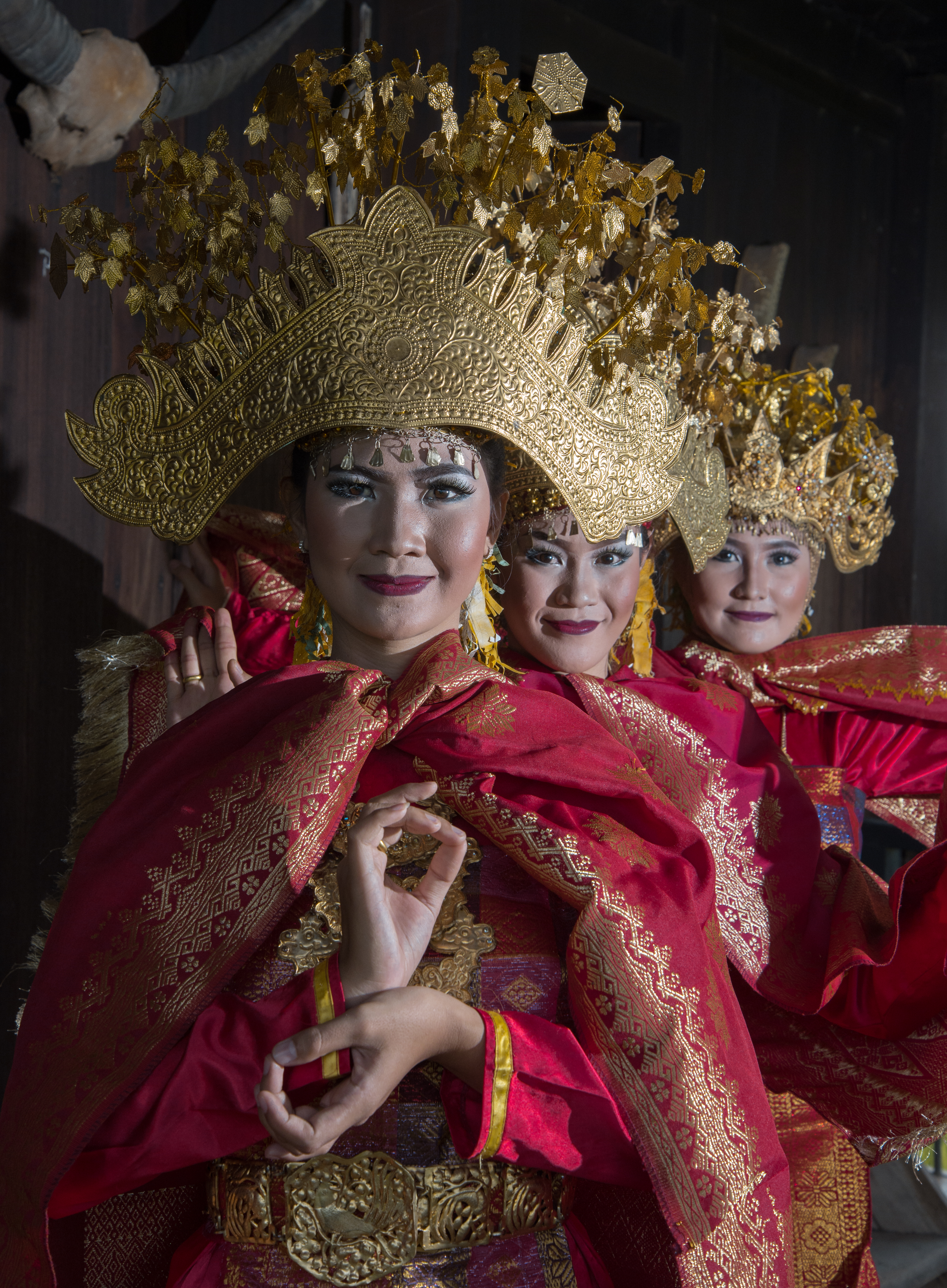
- The elegant dance of Kebagh
- Genre: Sacred dance
- Instrument(s): Kenong, Gong, Rebab
- Inventor: Palembang
- Origin: Indonesia

Kebagh dance, formerly known as the Semban Bidodari, is a traditional Palembang dance originating in Pagaralam, South Sumatra, Indonesia. This dance is characterized by the movement of opening both hands, such as spreading wings, and is usually performed to welcome distinguished guests in traditional ceremonies.

Kebaghl is the oldest traditional dance that is very popular in the Besemah area since ancient times. Although it was banned until the 1940s by the Dutch colonial government, this dance is still preserved and taught from generation to generation.

== Etymology ==
The word kebagh comes from the Besemah language, which means to spread wings, while semban bidodari refers to the large scarf worn by dancers.

== Performance ==
Kebagh dance is the oldest traditional Basemah art in Pagar Alam. The dancer is a girl. Kebagh dance is held at the time of welcoming the great guest/guest of honor at an official event or a wedding reception ceremony. Kebagh dance in ancient times was categorized as a sacred dance.

This dance has existed since the Dutch colonial era which has entered Pagar Alam. The Kebagh dance was created by the residents of Basemah village who at that time wanted to show an entertainment in order to welcome the grand guest/guest of honor at the wedding reception in their village. This dance is accompanied by kenong and rebab and is usually held in an open courtyard.

This dance is danced in pairs in the courtyard at night. The kebagh dance movement is inspired by the movement of the Dinang bird, this bird has a habit of living in groups and has beautiful movements and colors. Some of the people of Basemah believe that the Kebah dance was originally danced by an angel who became Puyang Serunting Sakti's wife.

== See also ==
- Gending Sriwijaya
- Melinting
- Pasambahan
- Dance in Indonesia
