= Pakuan City F.C. =

Association football team in Indonesia

Pakuan City
- Full name: Pakuan City Football Club
- Nicknames: Kijang Siliwangi (Siliwangi Deer)
- Short name: PCFC
- Founded: 2021; 5 years ago
- Ground: Pajajaran Stadium
- Capacity: 15,000
- Owner: Pakuan Football Enterprise
- CEO: Dodi Irwan Suparno
- Manager: Robby Firlana
- Coach: Jaino Matos
- League: Liga 4
- 2024: 3rd, in Group E (West Java zone series 2)
Home colours	Away colours

Pakuan City Football Club (simply known as Pakuan City or PCFC) is an Indonesian football club based in Bogor, West Java. They currently compete in the Liga 4.

== Nickname ==
Pakuan City has the nickname Kijang Siliwangi (Siliwangi Deer). This name was chosen because kijang comes from the same species as deer, an animal that is synonymous with the city of Bogor, while the word Siliwangi is taken from the name of Prabu Siliwangi who was one of the strongest kings who ever led the Sunda Kingdom, which was centered in Pakuan Pajajaran.

== History ==
Founded in 2021, Pakuan City made club debut into Indonesia football by joining the third-tier league Indonesia Liga 3 in 2021. They have acquired Cirebon Football Club which previously competed in Liga 3, they also moved their homebase from Cirebon to Bogor.

The CEO of Pakuan City, Dodi Irwan Suparno has a background as a veterinarian entrepreneur who owns a number of pet shop outlets in West Java. He took care of Pakuan City as CEO. He is known as a football fan and has a great desire to develop soccer at an early age.

Pakuan City's gait began by participating in the 2021 Bogor Mayor's Cup tournament. They succeeded in becoming champions after defeating Ebod Jaya in the final match, they even got rid of big-name clubs from Bandung Regency in the semi-finals.

== Honours ==
- Bogor Mayor's Cup
  - Champions (1): 2021

== Sponsorship ==
The complete sponsors are as follow

Sponsors

- Zenith Apparel
- Satwagia
- Bogor Raya TV
- PT. Zalila Hasiba Arshiya
- PT. Pakuan Andalan Siliwangi
- Moyya Water
- Milky Var
- Karya Anilo
- The Yonan Hotel
- Warunk Boss Bray
- Zayyan Water
- 90 Stats
- Enzo Water
