= Perssi Sukabumi =

Association football team in Indonesia

- Full name: Persatuan Sepakbola Sukabumi Indonesia
- Nickname: Laskar Bumi Geulis
- Short name: Perssi
- Founded: 16 June 1948; 77 years ago
- Ground: Suryakencana Stadium; Sukabumi, West Java
- Capacity: 5,000
- Owner: Askot PSSI Sukabumi
- Chairman: Syihabudin
- Manager: Asep Priatna
- Coach: Maswan
- League: Liga 4
- 2023: Quarter-Finals, (West Java zone)
Home colours	Away colours

Persatuan Sepakbola Sukabumi Indonesia (simply known as Perssi Sukabumi) is an Indonesian football club based in Sukabumi, West Java. They currently compete in the Liga 4.
