= Benpica F.C. =

Association football team in Indonesia

Benpica
- Full name: Benpica Football Club
- Nicknames: Laskar Bedog Hideung (Black Golok Warriors)
- Short name: BFC
- Founded: 1975; 51 years ago
- Ground: Mini Anda S. Dipura Stadium; Karawang, West Java
- Capacity: 2,000
- Owner: PSSI Karawang Regency
- Chairman: Iyus Suryana
- Manager: Dita Putri Yuliani
- Coach: Samsudin
- League: Liga 4
- 2024: Round of 16, (West Java zone series 2)
Home colours	Away colours

Benpica Football Club (simply known as Benpica) is an Indonesian football club based in Cikampek, Karawang Regency, West Java. They currently compete in the Liga 4.

== History ==
Benpica Football Club was established in 1975 by Anda Suhanda, but they first participated in the PSSI national competition in 2011 (Third Division of West Java). Started as an amateur football club and they only leveled up to semi-professional in 2011.

Benpica opened its academy club by collaborating with Persib Bandung. Both of them recently, they inaugurated a soccer school called Persib–Benpica Cikampek Academy. Persib–Benpica Cikampek Academy has five teams between ages, including U10, U12, U14, U16, and U18. they practice three times a week (Tuesday, Thursday, and Saturday) at the Mini Anda S. Dipura Stadium and the North Pangulah Football Field.
