= Depok United F.C. =

Association football team in Indonesia

Depok United
- Full name: Depok United Football Club
- Nickname: Singa Margonda
- Short name: DUFC
- Founded: 2011; 15 years ago
- Ground: Mahakam Stadium
- Capacity: 4,000
- Owner: Askot PSSI Depok
- CEO: Pradi Supriatna
- Manager: Samsunan
- Coach: Supandi
- League: Liga 4
- 2024: Round of 16, (West Java zone series 2)
Home colours	Away colours

Depok United Football Club (simply known as DUFC or Depok United) is an Indonesian football club based in Depok, West Java. They currently compete in the Liga 4.
