= Persika Karawang =

Indonesian football club

- Full name: Persatuan Sepakbola Indonesia Karawang
- Nicknames: Laskar Jawara; Ayam Ciparage
- Founded: 14 December 1951; 74 years ago
- Ground: Singaperbangsa Stadium
- Capacity: 25,000
- Owner: PT Singaperbangsa Karawang
- Manager: Anugrah
- Coach: Hidayat Abdul Soleh
- League: Liga 4
- 2024: Round of 16, (West Java zone series 2)
Home colours	Away colours

Persatuan Sepakbola Indonesia Karawang, commonly known as Persika, is an Indonesian football club based in Karawang, Karawang Regency, West Java. The club plays in Liga 4.
