= PSIT Cirebon =

Indonesian football club

- Full name: Persatuan Sepakbola Indonesia Tjirebon
- Nickname: Laskar Caruban Nagari
- Founded: 1934; 92 years ago
- Ground: Bima Stadium; Cirebon, West Java
- Capacity: 15,000
- Owner: Askot PSSI Cirebon
- Chairman: Edi Suripno
- Manager: Nur Eko Saputro
- League: Liga 4
Home colours	Away colours

Perserikatan Sepakbola Indonesia Tjirebon or PSIT Cirebon is a football club based in Cirebon, West Java. PSIT is the oldest football club in Cirebon, established in 1934. They currently play at Liga 4 and their homebase is Bima Stadium.
