= Geertruida Wijsmuller-Meijer =

Dutch resistance fighter (1896–1978)

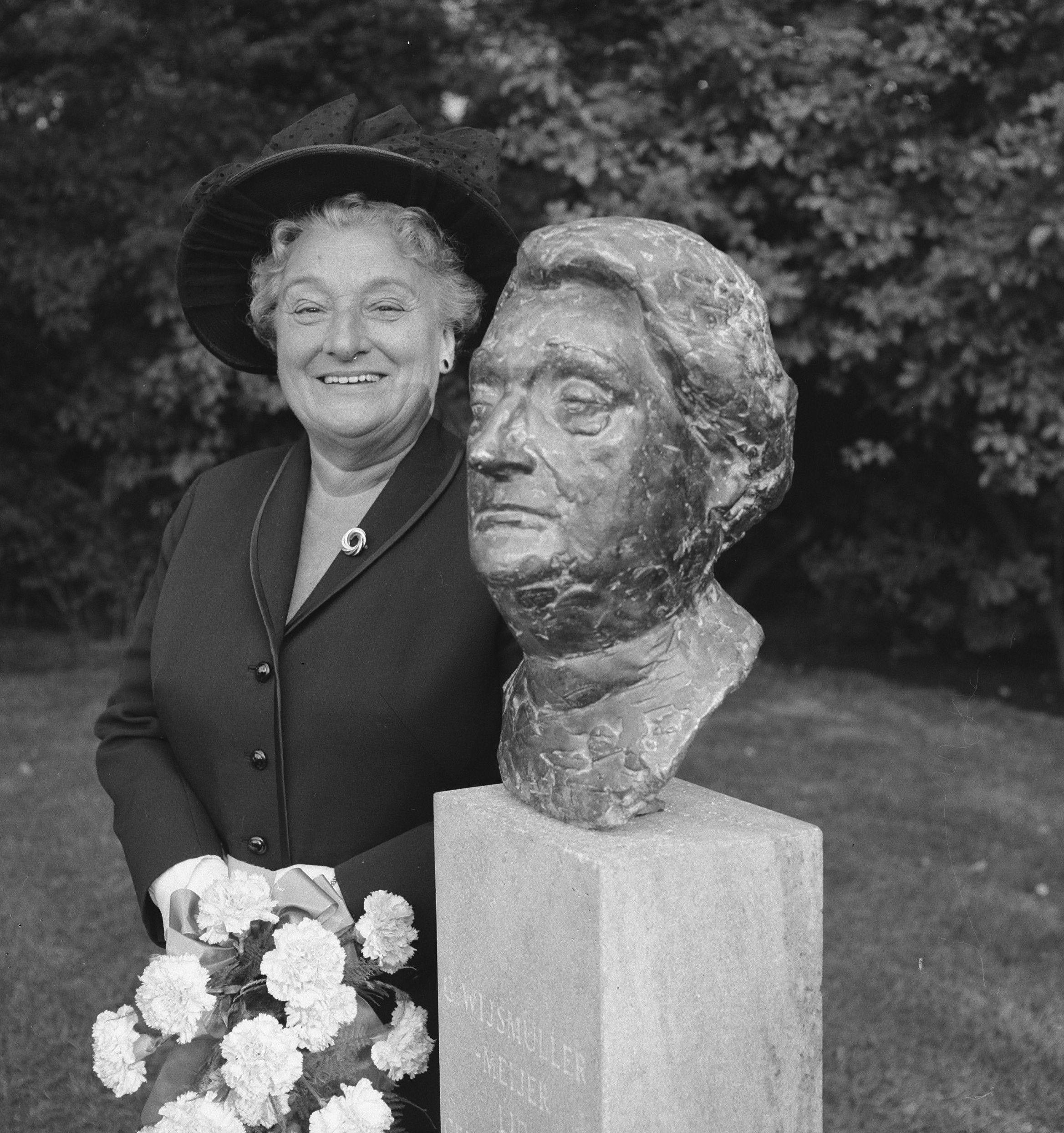
- Wijsmuller in 1965
- Born: Geertruida Meijer; April 21, 1896; Alkmaar, the Netherlands
- Died: August 30, 1978 (aged 82); Amsterdam, the Netherlands
- Other name: Truus
- Spouse: J. F. (Joop) Wijsmuller (m. 1922)
- Honours: Righteous among the Nations

Geertruida Wijsmuller-Meijer (21 April 1896, Alkmaar – 30 August 1978, Amsterdam) was a Dutch resistance fighter who brought Jewish children and adults into safety before and during World War II. Together with other people involved in the pre-war Kindertransport, she saved the lives of more than 10,000 Jewish children, fleeing antisemitism. She was honored as Righteous among the Nations by Yad Vashem. After the war she served on the Amsterdam city council.

== Early life ==
Geertruida Wijsmuller-Meijer, known as "Truus" to her family, was born in the city of Alkmaar. She was the firstborn child of Jacob Meijer, who worked in a drug store, and Hendrika Boer, a self-employed dressmaker. Truus came from a reformed liberal family. For two years she attended the School of Commerce. Her teachers described her as a "desperate case", "even though she is diligent". But gradually things got better, In 1913, the family moved to Amsterdam. Her parents taught her to stand up for people who deserve and need it. In 1919 after World War I, they set an example of helping the needy by taking into their home an Austrian boy who needed to recuperate.

A year later, she got her first job at a bank, where she met her future husband, the banker J. F. (Joop) Wijsmuller. They married in 1922 and lived on the Nassaukade in an apartment on the third floor. Wijsmuller stopped working, as was legally required.at the time. When it became clear that they were not having children, Wijsmuller became involved in social work. Through her social work she met Jewish women. Her husband supported her in all her activities. From 1933, they could always count on their live-in assistant, Cietje Hackmann, who did administration work and took care of children, if they stayed with them, when Wijsmuller was away from home.

== Social and political work ==
Wijsmuller took on several unpaid jobs as a social worker, including as a coordinator for an association for homecare, and administrator for a daycare center for children of working women. From 1939 on, she was a board member of Beatrix-Oord, a sanatorium in Amsterdam. After the war she had it converted into a general hospital, where abortion was offered. She joined the Vereeniging voor Vrouwenbelangen en Gelijk Staatsburgerschap ("Association for Women's Interests and for Equal Citizenship"). There she met chairman Mies Boissevain-van Lennep, who would later become a resistance fighter.

In addition to this work, Wijsmuller was nominated as number 6 on the list of Liberal candidates for the Amsterdam city council elections in 1935. Because of the threat of war she founded the Korps Vrouwelijke Vrijwilligers (KVV; "Corps for Female Volunteers") in 1938, which she managed from her home. Soon she had an extensive network of people.

== Work with Jewish children and refugees (1933 onward) ==
From 1933 onward, when Hitler came to power in Germany, Wijsmuller traveled to Germany to fetch family members of Jewish acquaintances and bring them safely to the Netherlands. She did so for many years.

After Kristallnacht in 1938, rumours reached her that Jewish children were wandering unattended in the woods, so she went to the Dutch–German border to investigate. She smuggled a Yiddish-speaking Polish boy across the border under her skirts, and took him to Amsterdam.

On 17 November 1938, she took her first group of six Jewish children from the crowded waiting room of the Dutch consulate in Hamburg to the train. Customs attempted to remove them from the train, but Wijsmuller noticed that the Dutch Princess Juliana was on the coupe next to her. She threatened customs that she would involve the princess if there escalated matter, after which customs backed down.

In November 1938, the British Government decided to let Jewish children under the age of 17 from Nazi countries enter the United Kingdom for a temporary stay. Various organisations started working together in the Refugee Children's Movement (RCM) to take care of these children.

== A visit to Eichmann ==
On December 2, Wijsmuller received a request to come to the newly established Dutch Children's Committee in Amsterdam. During this visit, Norman Bentwich from England was also present. He asked her to travel to Vienna to meet a certain Dr. Eichner, which they believed was the name of Adolf Eichmann. She left to Vienna the same day.

Eichmann then was the Nazi official handling the forced "emigration" of Jews. It was thought that Wijsmuller, as a non-Jewish woman, might be able to get permission from the Nazis for the children to travel to Britain. Eichmann snarled at her, but Wijsmuller was imperturbable and fearless. She told him why she came. "Unbelievable, so rein-arisch und dann so verrückt!" ("so purely Aryan and then so crazy"), Eichmann concluded. He responded by giving her permission to travel with 600 children, but it had to happen by the upcoming Saturday, on Shabbat, a deadline he seemed to assume she would not be able to make.

She reserved trains at the station, and, with the help of the parents and Jewish organisations, succeeded in evacuating 600 children from Vienna on 10 December. The journey from Vienna to Hook of Holland took around 30 hours. One hundred of the children received shelter in the Netherlands, while 500 traveled on to Britain. In England, Wijsmuller had contact with Lola Hahn-Warburg (a chairwoman from the RCM, who asked in astonishment: "but you were only sent to talk?" when Wijsmuller arrived with 600 children. In the Netherlands, she cooperated with the social worker Gertrude van Tijn from the Committee for Special Jewish Interests, belonging to the Committee for Jewish Refugees), Mies Boissevain-van Lennep and many others.

Wijsmullers' vigour was fuelled by the degrading way she had seen Jewish inhabitants treated in Vienna. In the Netherlands, however, nobody believed what she had seen.

== December 1938 till September 1939 Kindertransport ==
From then until the outbreak of World War II on September 1, 1939, Wijsmuller organised children's transports with children up to 17 years old from Nazi Germany and the annexed territories, mainly to Great Britain, but also to the Netherlands, Belgium and France. The trains from the south-east arrived via Emmerich on Tuesdays and Wednesdays; the trains from the north-east passed Bentheim on Thursdays.

After the first large transport, the work involved became more structured and a maximum of 150 children per transport was agreed upon. Several times a week, Wijsmuller traveled to Germany and Nazi-occupied territories to pick up children and arrange things on site with the organisers involved.

The children were allowed to take one suitcase, 10 German Marks and no photos or valuables. Mostly - but it was not always allowed- Jewish companions traveled with the children to the UK border, provided they all returned. Otherwise the transports would have ended. Once a group of weakened women and children of Sudeten Germans traveled with them.

This operation carried out under pressure required the cooperation of parents, guardians and various committees with volunteers in multiple cities and countries. Women took primary responsibility for the travel and accommodation of the children.

Wijsmuller was convinced of the urgency of these transports and gave momentum to the "Kindertransporte", as the evacuations came to be called. She maintained contacts with all of the parties involved in several countries, including the main committees in Vienna, Hamburg, Frankfurt and Berlin (from March 1939 in Prague and Dantzig) and also the train and boat companies.

She always carried in her handbag a toothbrush, a bar of soap and a towel, as she could be asked at any time to travel. Wijsmuller took responsibility for the travel documents when traveling.. She arranged, that the border police and customs controls were carried out as much as possible on the way before the border. And under her guidance (or under that of one of the other Dutch women). That prevented delays.

On August 24, 1939, Wijsmuller was met at the border by a delegation from the Gestapo with a brass band. She was forced to celebrate with them that she had crossed the border at Bentheim for the 50th time.

Wijsmuller was later quoted saying that the success of the operation was mainly due to the Jewish committees in Vienna, Frankfurt, Hamburg, Berlin and Breslau (and later in Prague, Dantzig and Riga). A miracle of self-control in her eyes, because she realized how afraid people must have been to send their children into the world.Nearly 10.000 children from Nazi-occupied territory reached the safety of England. In the Netherlands approximately 1800 children from the Third Reich remained.

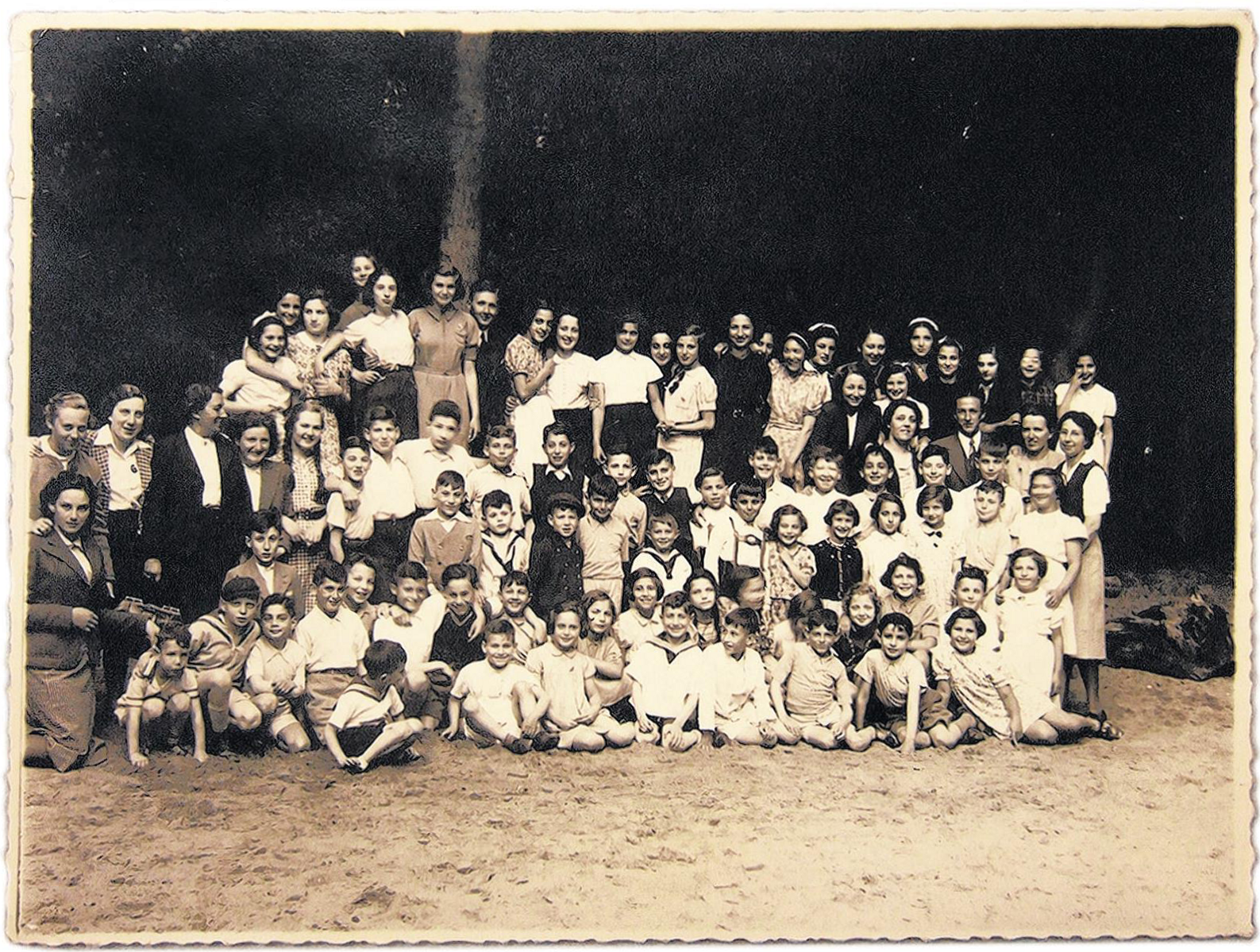

Other people organised evacuation transports too, for example Nicholas Winton and Recha Freier. Ultimately, 10,000 children up to 17 years old were saved from a certain death by being transported on a route via the Netherlands into Great Britain. Approximately 1800 refugee children from nazi-countries remained in the Netherlands.

The outbreak of the war between Great Britain and Germany in September 1939 put a stop to these transports, as from then on the borders to the UK were closed.

== Children in the Burgerweeshuis ==
From March 1939 onwards Wijsmuller was on the board of the Amsterdam orphanage Burgerweeshuis (now the Amsterdam Museum), which started to accommodate the refugee children. Wijsmuller and her husband were very involved with the children. The children came in small groups to stay overnight at the Wijsmullers'. Joop Wijsmuller took them on outings, for example to Artis, the Amsterdam zoo. The children called Wijsmuller "Tante Truus" (Auntie Truus).

== June and July 1939 Refugee ships ==
In June 1939, international negotiations took place in Antwerp among European countries about the distribution of nearly one thousand Jewish refugees on the MS St. Louis. Wijsmuller was part of the Dutch delegation, who boarded the ship and welcomed the 181 refugees on their arrival in the Netherlands. In July 1939 Wijsmuller was involved in the departure of children on the cargoship the Dora which eventually landed with 450 refugees in the then-British Mandatory Palestine.

== September–December 1939 Last journeys from the German border ==
The mobilisation disrupted train traffic and the border at Bentheim in Germany was closed. On 31 August Wijsmuller was told that a group of children from the Youth Aliyah was stuck in Kleve. She arranged travel documents, picked the children up in buses and took them to the boat in Hoek van Holland.

On 1 September, she received a telephone call from Germany that Orthodox boys were stranded at the station of Kleve. The Dutch Railways put together a train for her, consisting of dining cars. At the station at Kleve she also found a group of 300 Orthodox men from Galicia. She told the Germans that "after all, these are also boys", and got permission for them to leave. It was the last group to leave Nazi territory via Vlissingen to England.

In November and December 1939, she regularly collected Jewish refugees stranded in Bentheim (from Vienna and other places) who had papers for America. They left with the Holland America Line from Rotterdam.

== September 1939 - May 1940 journeys to England and the south of France ==
From September 1939 till May 1940, Wijsmuller helped Jewish children and adults stranded in the Netherlands, Belgium, Denmark and Sweden. She traveled with them to England, Spain, and the unoccupied parts of France. In Denmark she arranged an airplane and gasoline for the refugees. On these journeys (by plane to Amsterdam and from Amsterdam by plane to England, and by train to Marseille) she accompanied the refugees. She also arranged the necessary but hard-to-get travel documents.

Wijsmuller was described as a born tour conductor, being able to reassure the refugees and to identify the talented children aboard for songs, recitations and performances during the long train journey. From Marseille, people traveled on by boat to try to reach Mandatory Palestine.

In November 1939, Wijsmuller was arrested and mistreated by the French in Marseille, suspecting she was the much-wanted German spy "Erika". Due to a lack of evidence she was released.

== May 1940 Children from the Burgerweeshuis to England ==
On 10 May 1940, Wijsmuller was in Paris to take a child away when she heard of the German invasion of the Netherlands.She knew when the invasion would take place and had warned about it in The Hague. However, she was laughed at. Within three days she traveled back to Amsterdam, where she immediately was arrested and questioned by the Dutch police, on suspicion of espionage. After her release she went to the orphanage Burgerweeshuis to see the children. The local garrison commander passed a request on to her from London to arrange for the Jewish children at the orphanage to travel as fast as possible to the coastal town of IJmuiden so they could catch a boat to England on time.

Wijsmuller brought along as many children as possible on the way, bringing a total of 74 children to the very last boat, the SS Bodegraven", that left the harbor. Minutes later the Dutch government surrendered. The Bodegraven sailed for England, but due to the German nationality of the children, at first they were not allowed to disembark. Eventually the ship moored on 19 May at Liverpool.

The children spent the war with foster families and in various institutions in England. Wijsmuller decided to stay in the Netherlands. She wanted to be with her husband and besides she found there was more work for her to do.

== May 1940-1943 Help for Jewish children in wartime ==
After the capitulation of the Netherlands, Wijsmuller traveled to Brussels. There, she consulted with the Belgian Red Cross and the Belgian Children's Committee. In Paris she had also contact with the French Red Cross and with the OSE (Oeuvre Secours aux Enfants, a Jewish aid organisation for children). During this period Wijsmuller devoted herself to uniting families. She took children to their parents who had escaped to Belgium and France. On her way back she brought children with her whose parents remained in the Netherlands. Sometimes she brought children to their parents in Germany. She placed children of Jewish women with other, safe families shortly after birth. In Brussels she made contact with Benno M. Nijkerk, (1906-1944 Neuengamme) a Dutch-Belgian businessman. They agreed to bring as many children as possible to the south, legally or illegally.

Nijkerk had false identity cards forged in Brussels. He was the treasurer of the "Comité de Défense des Juifs", a Belgian Jewish resistance group. Later he became a member of "Dutch-Paris", an underground network of the Dutch, Belgian and French resistance. Wijsmuller smuggled the false identity cards with information about the escape route to Holland. This work continued until at least 1943.

In June 1943, she traveled for the last time with Jewish children in the direction of the Spanish border.

== Till March 1941 Work with the Amsterdam Red Cross in France ==
With the Amsterdam Red Cross she traveled with food and medicine to the Gurs and St. Cyprien internment camps in the south of France. The financing was partly organised by Wijsmuller. She obtained the required German travel and passage permits via the Amsterdam and Belgian Red Cross. Whenever possible she took along Jewish children and smuggled them to Vichy France or Spain. This help came to an end in March 1941, when the Dutch Red Cross terminated her travel permits after Wijsmuller made her criticism known about their representative in Paris.

== End of 1941 till June 1942 Travels to Spain ==
From May 1941 to June 1942, Wijsmuller was involved in refugees on behalf of the Hoymans & Schuurman's agency and other stakeholders. At the SS's request, Wijsmuller functioned as the liaison between the SS, the Jewish Dutch, and the agency. She accompanied groups who still had permission from the Nazis – having paid a lot of money – to leave Europe through Spain and Portugal. Wijsmullers' condition to cooperate was that Jewish children could travel free of charge. With this, she helped bring about 150 people to safety. The travels to Spain continued after May 1942. With these efforts, a total of 341 people escaped the Nazis.

== 1941 till June 1942 Help for French soldiers ==
From 1941 to June 1942, she arranged help for French soldiers who wanted to flee. At Nijkerks' request, she made contact with a German just across the Dutch border. She provided, with others' help, civilian clothing, an escape route and a shelter in Nispen. There, the soldiers had to say that they were from "Madame Odi": the alias of Wijsmuller.

== May 1942 Arrest of Wijsmuller ==
In May 1942, Wijsmuller was arrested and put in custody in the prison on the Amstelveenseweg in Amsterdam. The Gestapo suspected she was helping Jewish refugees to flee the Netherlands to France and Switzerland. A group of Jews and their hiding people were arrested at their hiding place in Nispen. Wijsmuller had provided them with false identity papers and escape routes, which she smuggled from Brussels to the Netherlands. But the refugees only knew her pseudonym "Madame Odi". Her husband came to plead her innocence with the Nazis. Wijsmuller was released after a few days due to a lack of evidence. She kept in contact with Nijkerk. At the end of 1943 travelling abroad became impossible.

== 1942-1944 Food aid ==
From 1942, Wijsmuller was also a member of Group 2000, a resistance group led by Jacoba van Tongeren. Her position was head of the Red Cross Services. She focused on sending food parcels. All children in Westerbork received a package at Christmas 1943. After that, Wijsmuller worked three days a week with others in the Nieuwe Kerk to prepare and send food parcels, first to people in Westerbork, and from February to September 1944 to people in the Bergen-Belsen and Theresienstadt concentration camps. A total of 7000 parcels were sent by name. People also brought food to her house to distribute. An egg merchant from Landsmeer brought her about 1000 duck eggs every week. Wijsmuller then delivered them to elderly homes and hospitals in the city. She called this work the "foodbusiness".

== September 1944 Children from Westerbork ==
In September 1944, Wijsmuller discovered that 50 "orphans" (Jewish children taken up without their parents) from Westerbork would be deported. She regularly had brought food to a number of these children in the Amsterdam Huis van Bewaring (house of detention). Alarmed by this news, she went to the Nazis. She claimed that she knew these children were not Jewish, but born out of Dutch non-Jewish mothers and German soldiers. According to the law these children were Dutch. To prove her point she showed a Dutch bill which she had manufactured herself. She insisted on "special treatment" for the children. The children traveled on to Theresienstadt, stayed together as a group and returned after the war.

== Contacts with nazis ==
With the Nazis, Wijsmuller had contacts from high to low. She used it when she wanted something done from them. For example, she received travel documents for Jewish children to leave the country from a Gestapo employee who believed that children belonged with their parents. Before that, she had accepted his invitation to have a drink with him on an Amsterdam terrace. He saw her walking in the street and recognized her. Previously he was a border official during the "Kindertransport".

In May 1941, SS member Rajakowitsch called her to The Hague. He demanded her to write down what she was doing and stop her help. Wijsmuller pretended ignorance, acting as if she did not understand how serious the situation was.

Wijsmuller later praised German officers for helping her in dire situations.

== Hunger winter 1944-1945 ==
Hunger became a serious issue in the Dutch cities. When it was no longer possible to send food parcels to the camps, Wijsmuller, as a member of an interconfessional group, organized the evacuation of 6,649 famished children from Amsterdam across the IJsselmeer to the countryside. The children were able to recuperate there.

On 7 April 1945, the Amsterdam police informed Wijsmuller that 120 Allied soldiers were being held in a monastery in Aalsmeer. They were in a bad way. Wanting to help, Wijsmuller cycled to Aalsmeer, the first time with medication, and managed to get in. She threatened the Germans that they could be charged after the war. Immediately after the capitulation of Germany Wijsmuller sought contact with the Germans in Utrecht, who knew her by her nickname "die verrückte Frau Wijsmuller" ("the crazy Mrs. Wijsmuller") due to her help to Jews. They referred her to the Canadians in Hilversum. The latter sent cars and Wijsmuller went ahead to deliver the soldiers to them.

== After World War II ==
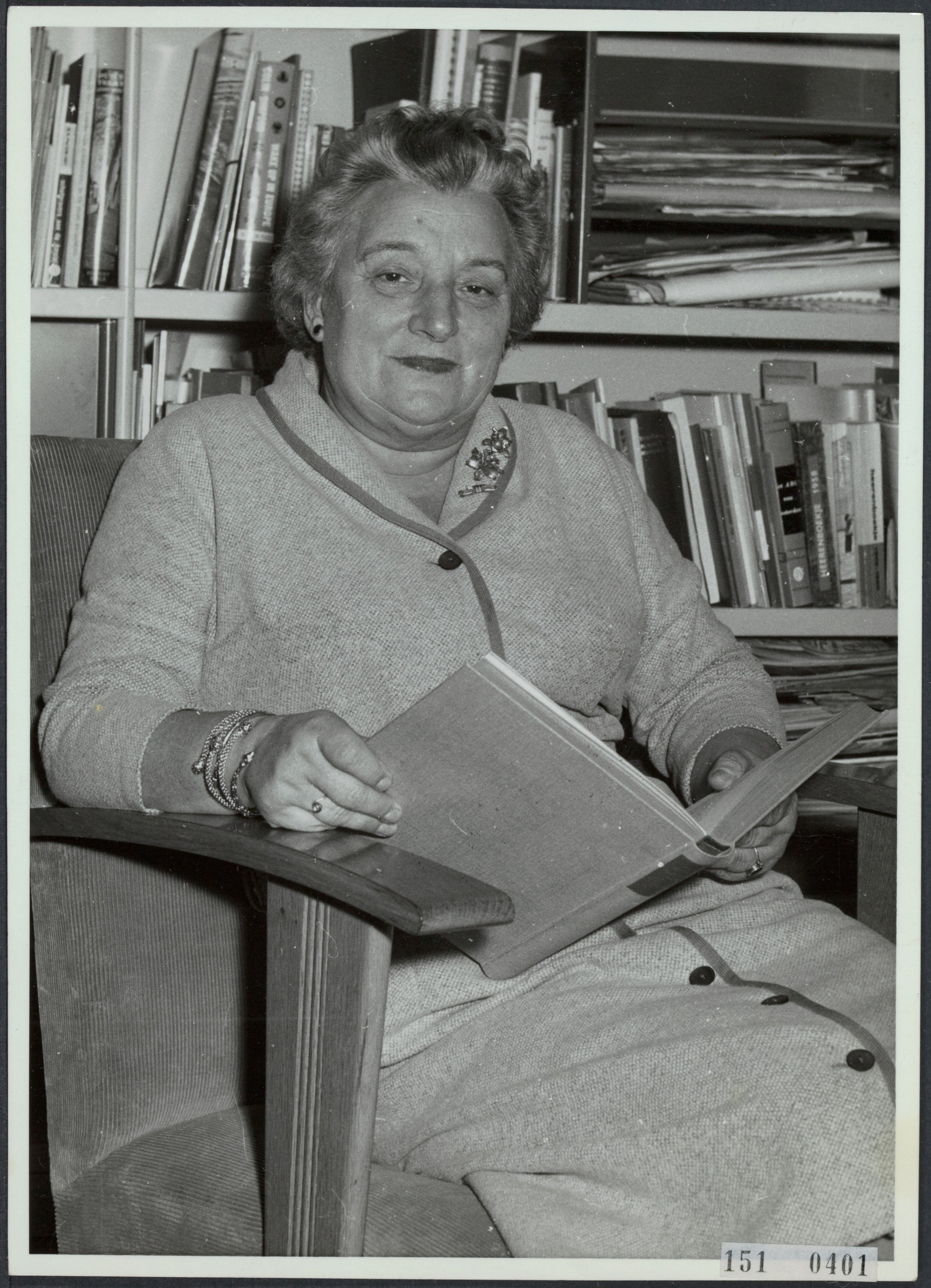
Wijsmuller after World War II

After the war, Wijsmuller traced displaced children in Germany, as member number 1 from the KVV and as a UNRRA (a precursor of the UN) employee. This was followed by the organisation of trips to England, Switzerland and Denmark of malnourished children from the Netherlands. From 1945 until 1966, she was a member of the Amsterdam city council for the liberal party (VVD). She was involved in social work and many social projects in the Netherlands and abroad.

Soon, she was on about 12 boards and committees. She was involved in the creation of workplaces for the disabled in Amsterdam and the founding of a hospital in Suriname. In 1957, she was a founder and board member of the Anne Frank House. She remained a board member until 1975. As a director and board member she had the Amsterdam sanatorium "Beatrix" converted into a general hospital. Abortion and gender-related operations were offered there.

Most of the Jewish children found that their parents did not survive the Shoah, but some were reunited with their families. Until her death Wijsmuller kept in touch with children she saved, from Enkhuizen to England and Israel.

Joop Wijsmuller died on December 31, 1964. Cietje Hackman lived with Wijsmuller until her death on August 30, 1978. Wijsmuller left her body for scientific research.

In an advertisement after her death, she was described as the "Mother of 1001 children, who made her job of saving Jewish children".

== Memories of Wijsmuller ==
Wijsmuller has been described and remembered as having an impressive personality and a powerful voice. She was energetic and practical. Cheeky but never rude. She could improvise and negotiate. It was her preference to work on her own, as she considered that safer. Wijsmuller never accepted money for her work.

In the months and years following the outbreak of the war she never ceased to go wherever work needs to be done.

In the postwar years she was also characterized as a headstrong and dominant woman, and, looking back, like an adventurer. In Amsterdam, she was nicknamed both "tante Truus/Auntie Truus" and "stoomwals/steamroller".

== Monuments ==
- A sculpture of her, made by Herman Diederik Janzen, was unveiled in 1965 in the sanatorium "Beatrixoord" in Amsterdam. Into the plinth was carved: "G. Wijsmuller-Meijer, member of the Amsterdam City Council 1945-1966. Bellatrix, Vigilans, Beatrix". When "Beatrixoord" was closed, Wijsmuller took the statue home. After her death in 1978 it was reinstated on the Bachplein in Amsterdam. A plaque at the foot mentioned: "Mother of 1001 children, who made rescuing Jewish children her life's work". In 2019, a new plaque was placed with information about her rescuing work before and during the war and the medals she received.
- On 30 November 2011, a monument in Hook of Holland was unveiled by Mayor Aboutaleb, commemorating the 10,000 Jewish children that left for England from there. The monument was designed by Frank Meisler, one of the children on the transports. He made four other monuments that are located in Gdańsk (2009), Berlin (2008), London (2006) and Hamburg (2015).
- Streets have been named after her in Amsterdam, Gouda, Leiden, Pijnacker, Coevorden and Alkmaar. In Leiden, a tunnel bears her name.
- In Amsterdam bridge number 793 is named after her. Truus Wijsmullerbrug
- Asteroid number 15296 is named "Tante Truus" ("Auntie Truus") after her.
- On March 8, 2020 "Truus' Children" was released, a documentary by Pamela Sturhoofd and Jessica van Tijn from "Special Eyes". It is an ode to Wijsmuller, with interviews with more than 20 children whom she saved.
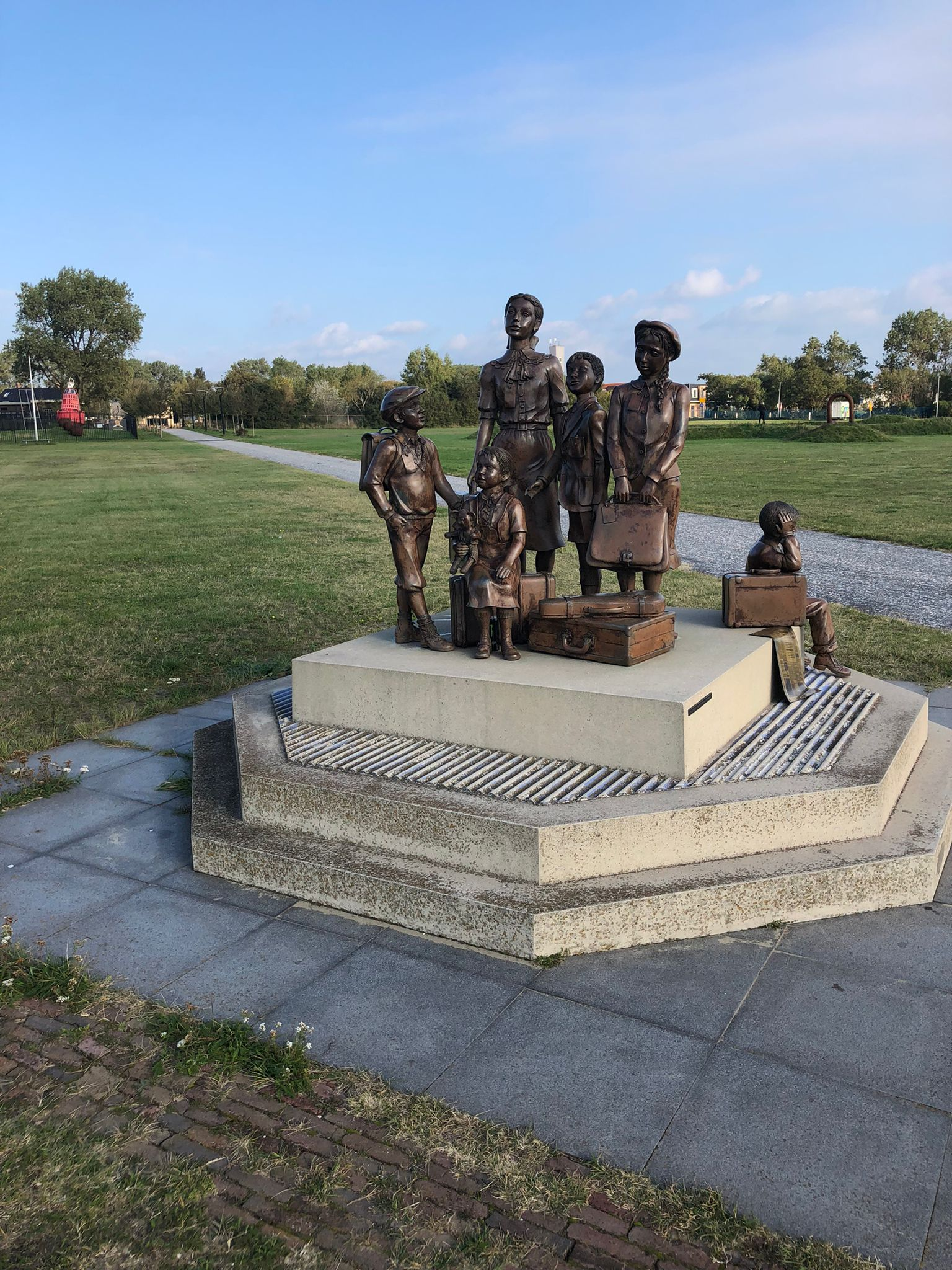
- Hoek van Holland, Monument Kindertransporten
  A statue of Truus Wijsmuller and the "1001 children" she helped saving was unveiled on 1 July 2020 in her hometown of Alkmaar. The tribute was an initiative of the Historical Society of Alkmaar. The statue was made by Annet Terberg-Pompe and Lea Wijnhoven.
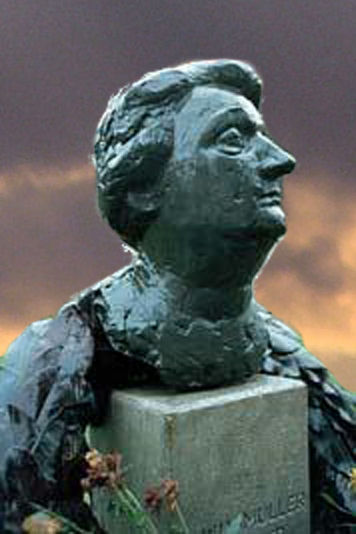
Statue Truus Wijsmuller in Amsterdam

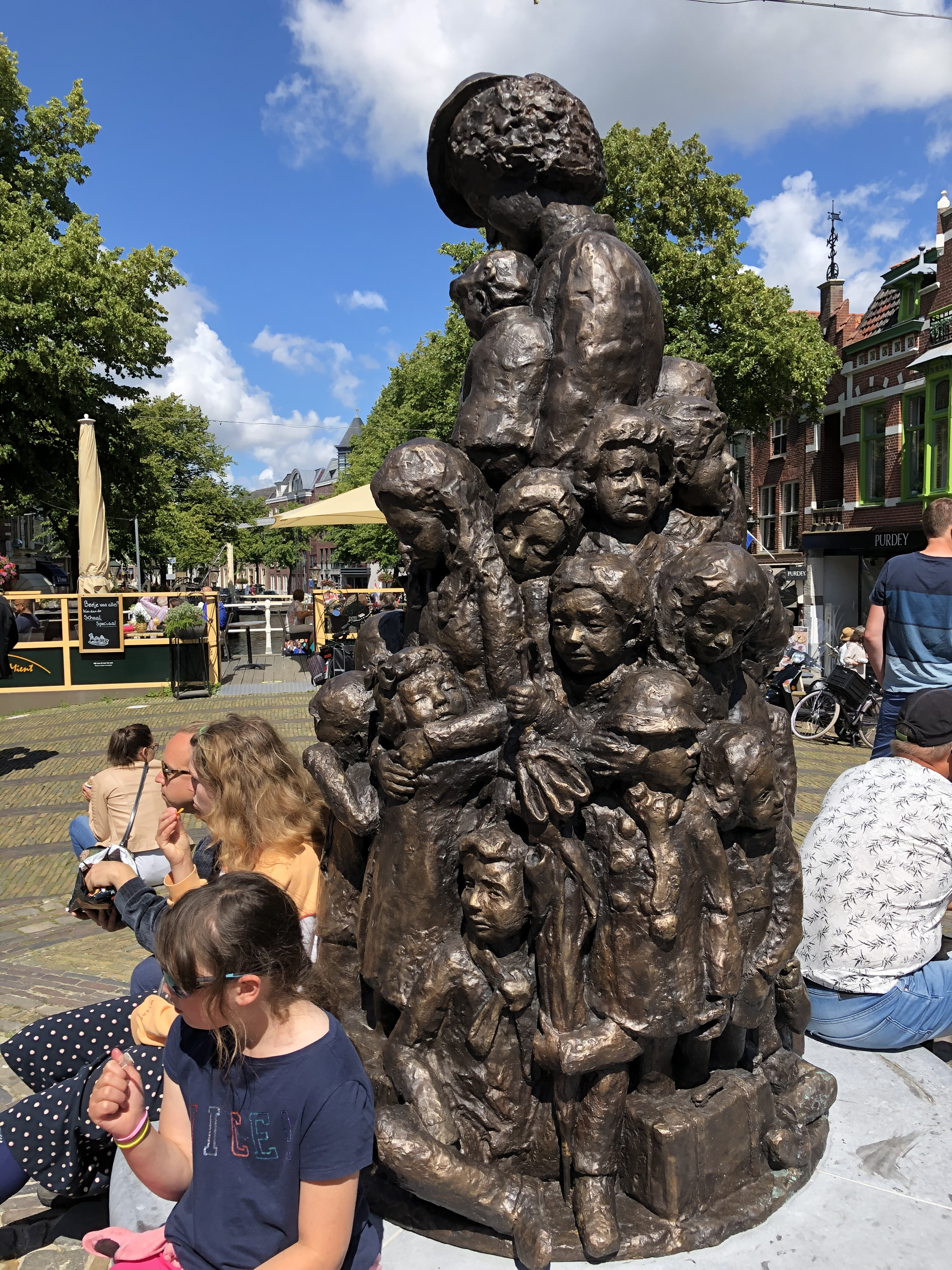
Truus Wijsmulller statue in Alkmaar

== Distinctions ==
- Knight in the order of Orange Nassau, 21-04-1955 for social work in Amsterdam,
- Medal of French Gratitude (Reconnaissance Francaise), silver medal for help to French soldiers
- Medals from the Dutch and German Red Cross
- ANV-Visser Neerlandiaprijs in 1962, for assistance for Jewish children
- Righteous among the Nations in 1966
- Truus Wijsmuller tree in Yad Vashem in 1966
- Officer in the order of Orange Nassau 19-04-1971 as a treasurer of the Koningin Wilhelmina Fonds
- Honorary Citizen of Amsterdam (Silver Medal) April 1971, for her work for the city

== Literature ==
- NIOD Institute for War, Holocaust and Genocide Studies
  - archiefcollectie 299, 1934 A, Documentatie I, G. (Truus) Wijsmuller-Meijer, "Archieven Yad Vashem, Copie," Verslag van een op grammofoonplaten opgenomen gesprek van mw Wijsmuller-Meijer", 114 pagina's, ongedateerd/niet geautoriseerd [Archives Yad Vashem "Report of a conversation recorded on gramophone records from Mrs Wijsmuller -Meijer", undated. Not authorized]
  - Documentatie 2 G. Wijsmuller -Meijer, Artikelen 42, 1957–1971, e.g. "Tante Truus een reuze vrouw", (engl. "Aunt Truus a giant woman") Rogier van Aerde, "Margriet" 04-05-1979
- NIOD Library, D 'Aulnis, Madelon, "Joodse kinderen op reis naar de vrijheid 1938-1943",- Truus Wijsmullers' werkzaamheden voor gezinsvereniging in en emigratie uit West-Europa- (ongepubliceerde) afstudeerscriptie nieuwe geschiedenis UvA, 1987 (engl. "Jewish children on a journey to freedom 1938-1943"- Truus Wijsmullers' work for family reunification in and emigration from Western Europe- Unpublished graduation thesis University of Amsterdam, New History, 1987)
- Archief Raadsgriffie Gemeente Amsterdam, enkele artikelen/verslagen (engl Archives Council registry of the municipality of Amsterdam/ some articles and reports)
- Stadsarchief Amsterdam 934, Geertruida Wijsmuller-Meijer, 1 (trouwboekje 1899 en 1922), 2,3,19 (engl City Archives of Amsterdam, marriage certificate 1899 and 1922)
- Regionaal Archief Alkmaar, geboorteakte Geertruida Meijer, gezinskaart Jacob Meijer, Archief Handelsschool (Hogere) HBS-A 1911-1912 en 1912–1913, (engl. Regional Archive of Alkmaar, birth certificate and family card, and Trade School Archives, Records 1911-1912 and 1912–1913)
- Barley, Ann, "Patrick calls me mother", 1948, Harper & Brothers, New York
- Boas, Henriëtte, "Het begon in november 1938" - Een interview met mw. Wijsmuller in vijf afleveringen-, Nieuw Israëlietisch Weekblad 12-12-1952, 02-01-1953,16-01-1953, 30-01-1953, 06-02-1953 (engl. It started in 1938 - An interview with mrs Wijsmuller in 5 episodes- Nieuw Israëlietisch Weekblad, 12-12-1952, 02-01-1953, 16-01-1953, 30-01-1953, 06-02-1953)
- By the journalist L..C.Vrooland, Truus Wijsmuller-Meijer: "Geen tijd voor tranen" (No time for tears ),. Amsterdam 1961 Not authorized biography, based on conversations with Wijsmuller, among other things. And Tweede druk 1963 Emmanuel Querido Uitgeverij NV Amsterdam
- Presser, J. "De ondergang", deel I, Staatsuitgeverij 's Gravenhage 1977, ISBN 90-12-01804-8 pag. 12 (engl "The downfall", part I)
- Madelon d'Aulnis, "So reinarisch und dann so verrückt", Ons Amsterdam, mei 1993, page 121-124 (engl "So pure Aryan and then so crazy")
- Mark Jonathan Harris and Deborah Oppenheimer, 2000 "Into the arms of strangers", Warner Bros, ISBN 0-7475-5092-1
- Miriam Keesing, "De kinderen van tante Truus", Dagblad Het Parool, 1 mei 2010 (http://www.dokin.nl/publications/het-parool-children-of-tante-truus)
- Bernard Wasserstein, 2013 "Gertrude van Tijn en het lot van de Nederlandse Joden", Nieuw Amsterdam Uitgevers ISBN 0-7475-5092-1, (engl Bernard Wasserstein "The ambiguity of virtue"- Gertrude van Tijn and the fate of the Dutch Jews, 2014. Harvard University Press, ISBN 978-0-674-28138-7
- Lida Boukris-Jong "Truus Wijsmuller - een vrouw uit duizenden- ",(engl "A woman in a thousand") Tijdschrift "Oud Alkmaar", jaargang 39, nr 2 2015, pag. 39-45
- Paul van Tongeren "Jacoba van Tongeren en de onbekende verzetshelden van groep 2000" Uitgeverij Aspekt, Amsterdam 2015 ISBN 978-94-6153-483-5 9 (engl "Jacoba van Tongeren and the unknown resistance heroes of group 2000")
- Megan Koreman, "Gewone helden" - De Dutch Paris ontsnappingslijn 1942–1945, (engl "Ordinairy heroes"-The Dutch-Paris escape line-, Uitgeverij Boom, Amsterdam 2016 ISBN 978-90-5875-556-8)
- David de Leeuw: "De kinderen van Truus" (engl "Truus'children", In: Nieuw Israëlietisch Weekblad, 04-08 2017, nr 39, pp. 20–25
- "Truus Wijsmuller-Meijer, a forgotten heroine", www.dokin.nl (2017)
- Kanselarij der Nederlandse Orden (engl Chancery of the Dutch Orders)
