= 2024 Cimahi mayoral election =

- 27 November 2024
- Turnout: 72.05%
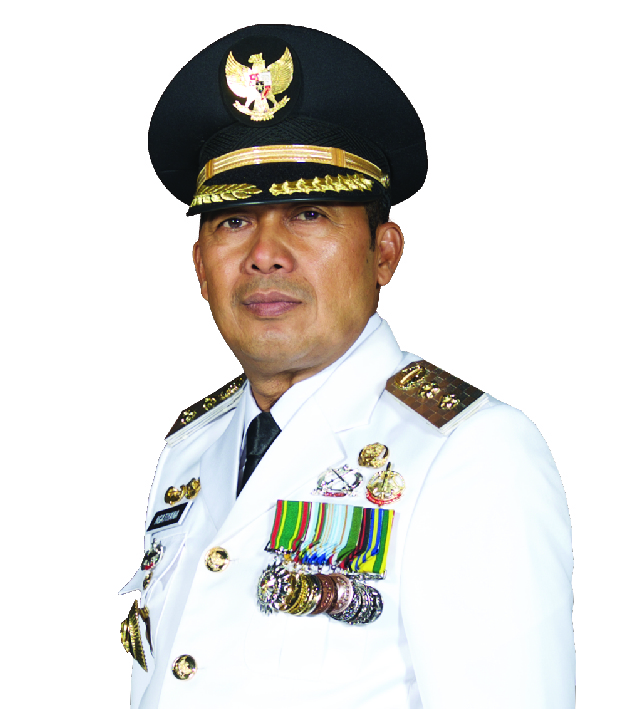

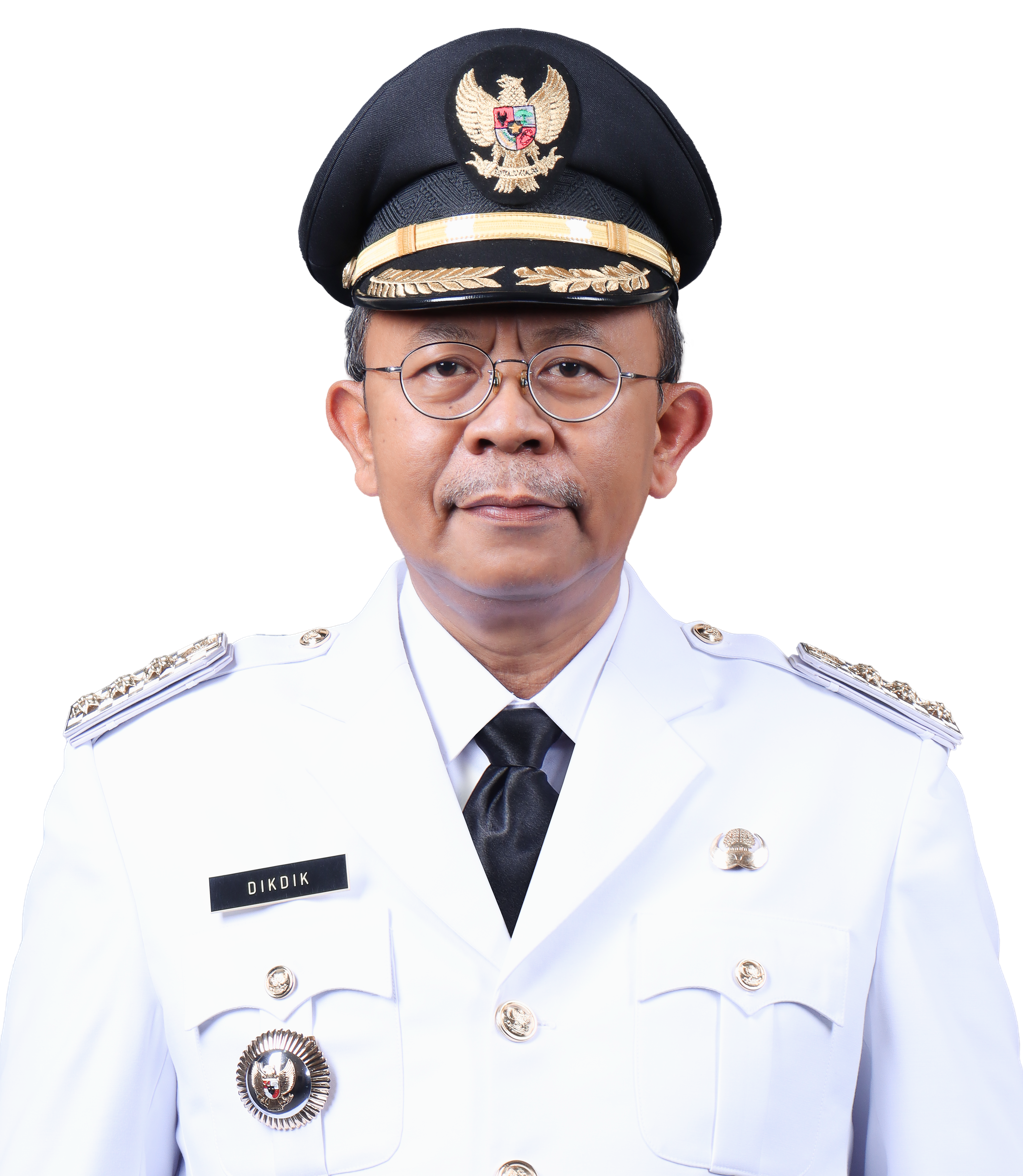

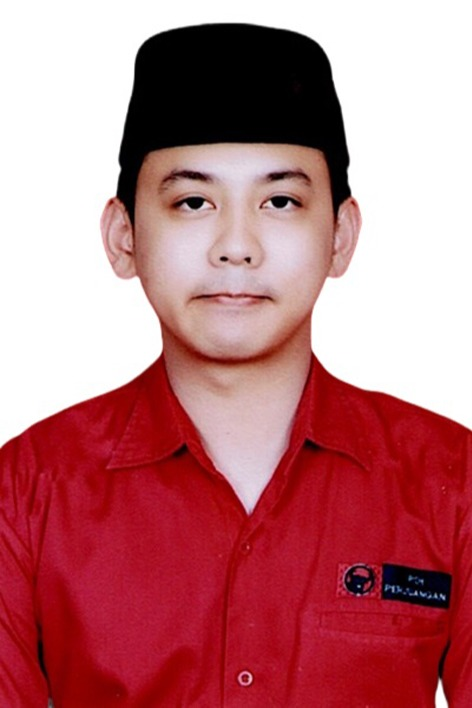
| Candidate | Ngatiyana | Dikdik Suratno Nugrahawan | Bilal Insan M. Priyatna |
| Party | PKB | Golkar | PDI-P |
| Running mate | Adhitia Yudisthira | Bagja Setiawan | A. Mulyana |
| Popular vote | 121,108 | 100,673 | 68,591 |
| Percentage | 41.71% | 34.67% | 23.62% |
Mayor before election
Benny Bachtiar (acting)
Independent
Elected mayor
Ngatiyana
PKB

The 2024 Cimahi mayoral election was held on 27 November 2024 as part of nationwide local elections to elect the mayor and vice mayor of Cimahi, West Java for a five-year term. The previous election was held in 2017. Former Mayor Ngatiyana of the National Awakening Party (PKB) won the election with 41% of the vote. Former Cimahi City Secretary Dikdik Suratno Nugrahawan of Golkar placed second with 34%, followed by Bilal Insan M. Priyatna of the Indonesian Democratic Party of Struggle (PDI-P), who received 23%.

== Electoral system ==
The election, like other local elections in 2024, follow the first-past-the-post system where the candidate with the most votes wins the election, even if they do not win a majority. It is possible for a candidate to run uncontested, in which case the candidate is still required to win a majority of votes "against" an "empty box" option. Should the candidate fail to do so, the election will be repeated on a later date.

== Candidates ==
According to electoral regulations, in order to qualify for the election, candidates were required to secure support from a political party or a coalition of parties controlling 9 seats (20 percent of all seats) in the Cimahi Regional House of Representatives (DPRD). The Prosperous Justice Party, with 9 seats from the 2024 legislative election, is the only party eligible to nominate a mayoral candidate without forming a coalition with other parties. Candidates may alternatively demonstrate support to run as an independent in form of photocopies of identity cards, which in Cimahi's case corresponds to 35,423 copies. One independent candidate registered with the General Elections Commission (KPU), but failed to submit sufficient proofs of support.

=== Potential ===
The following are individuals who have either been publicly mentioned as a potential candidate by a political party in the DPRD, publicly declared their candidacy with press coverage, or considered as a potential candidate by media outlets:

- Ngatiyana, previous mayor.
- Achmad Zulkarnain (PKS), speaker of Cimahi DPRD.
- Bagja Setiawan (PKS), member of West Bandung Regency DPRD.
- Dikdik Suratno Nugrahawan, city secretary of Cimahi.
- Adhitia Yudisthira, former secretary to mayor of Bandung Dada Rosada.

== Political map ==
Following the 2024 Indonesian legislative election, nine political parties are represented in the Cimahi DPRD:

| Political parties | Seat count |
|---|---|
| Prosperous Justice Party (PKS) | 9 / 45 |
| Party of Functional Groups (Golkar) | 7 / 45 |
| Indonesian Democratic Party of Struggle (PDI-P) | 6 / 45 |
| Democratic Party (Demokrat) | 6 / 45 |
| Great Indonesia Movement Party (Gerindra) | 5 / 45 |
| NasDem Party | 5 / 45 |
| National Awakening Party (PKB) | 4 / 45 |
| National Mandate Party (PAN) | 2 / 45 |
| United Development Party (PPP) | 1 / 45 |

== Results ==
| Candidate | Running mate | Party | Votes | % |
|---|---|---|---|---|
| Ngatiyana | Adhitia Yudisthira | National Awakening Party | 121,108 | 41.71 |
| Dikdik Suratno Nugrahawan | Bagja Setiawan | Golkar | 100,673 | 34.67 |
| Bilal Insan M. Priyatna | A. Mulyana | Indonesian Democratic Party of Struggle | 68,591 | 23.62 |
| Total | | | 290,372 | 100.00 |
| Valid votes | | | 290,372 | 95.97 |
| Invalid/blank votes | | | 12,201 | 4.03 |
| Total votes | | | 302,573 | 100.00 |
| Registered voters/turnout | | | 419,974 | 72.05 |
Source: KPU
