= Ngatiyana =

Indonesian politician and military officer

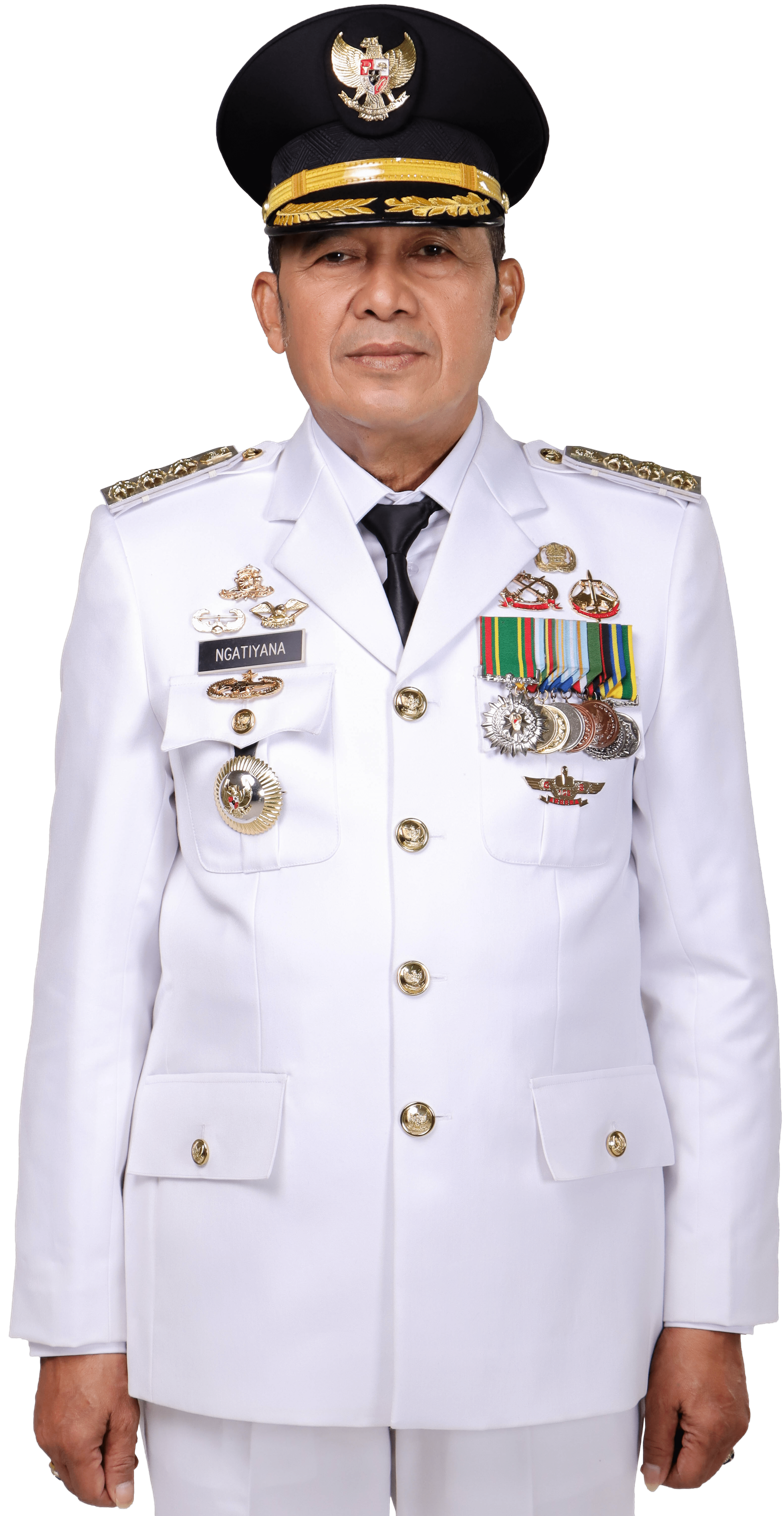

4th Mayor of Cimahi
- Incumbent
- Assumed office 20 February 2025
- President: Prabowo Subianto
- Governor: Dedi Mulyadi
- Lieutenant: Adhitia Yudisthira
- Preceded by: Benny Bachtiar (Acting)
- In office 16 August 2022 – 22 October 2022
- President: Joko Widodo
- Governor: Ridwan Kamil
- Preceded by: Ajay Muhammad Priatna
- Succeeded by: Dikdik Suratno Nugrahawan (Acting)
- Acting Mayor of Cimahi
- In office 28 November 2020 – 16 August 2022
- President: Joko Widodo
- Governor: Ridwan Kamil
- Definitive mayor: Ajay Muhammad Priatna

4th Deputy Mayor of Cimahi
- In office 22 Oktober 2017 – 16 August 2022
- President: Joko Widodo
- Governor: Ahmad Heryawan; Ridwan Kamil
- Mayor: Ajay Muhammad Priatna
- Preceded by: Sudiarto
- Succeeded by: Adhitia Yudisthira

Personal details
- Born: July 5, 1961 (age 65) Bantul, Yogyakarta Special Region, Indonesia
- Spouse: Midjiati Ningsih

Military service
- Allegiance: Indonesia
- Branch/service: Indonesian Army
- Years of service: 1983—2017
- Rank: Lieutenant colonel
- Battles/wars: Occupation of East Timor

Ngatiyana (born 5 July 1961) is the 4th Mayor of Cimahi who has served since February 20, 2025. Previously, he served as Deputy Mayor of Cimahi for the 2017–2022 period accompanying Ajay Muhammad Priatna. In 2020, he became acting mayor, replacing Ajay. He was then inaugurated as the permanent mayor on August 16, 2022.

== Early life ==
Ngatiyana was born in Bantul Regency on 5 July 1961. After completing his studies at a technical school in Yogyakarta, he moved to Jakarta for work, and later moving to Bandung to work at Indonesian Aerospace. He resigned from his job to enroll in the Indonesian Army in 1983.

== Career ==
After completing basic training, Ngatiyana was deployed to East Timor where he served until 1988. He would return to East Timor between 1990 and 1992, before joining the Officer Candidate School. He then became the adjutant to Luhut Binsar Pandjaitan in Pandjaitan's various military and civilian postings, until 2001 when Pandjaitan ended his tenure as Minister of Industry and Trade. Ngatiyana held technical positions in the army infantry center and army training command until he retired in 2017 in order to run in that year's local elections. He held the rank of lieutenant colonel at the time of his retirement.

In 2017, Ngatiyana ran as a candidate for the vice-mayor of the city of Cimahi, West Java, with Ajay Muhammad Priatna as his running mate. The pair won 40.55% of the votes in the three-candidate race, defeating the incumbent mayor and another challenger. Ajay and Ngatiyana were sworn in on 22 October 2017. Following the arrest of Ajay by the Corruption Eradication Commission, Ngatiyana was appointed as acting mayor on 28 November 2020. On 16 August 2022, he was appointed as full mayor for the rest of his term, which expired on 22 October 2022. He was replaced by Dikdik Suratno Nugrahawan who became the new acting mayor.

He was reelected for a second term in Cimahi's 2024 mayoral election.

== Family ==
Ngatiyana married Midjiati Ningsih in 1988, and the couple has four children.
