= Jacoba van Tongeren =

Dutch resistance fighter in WW II

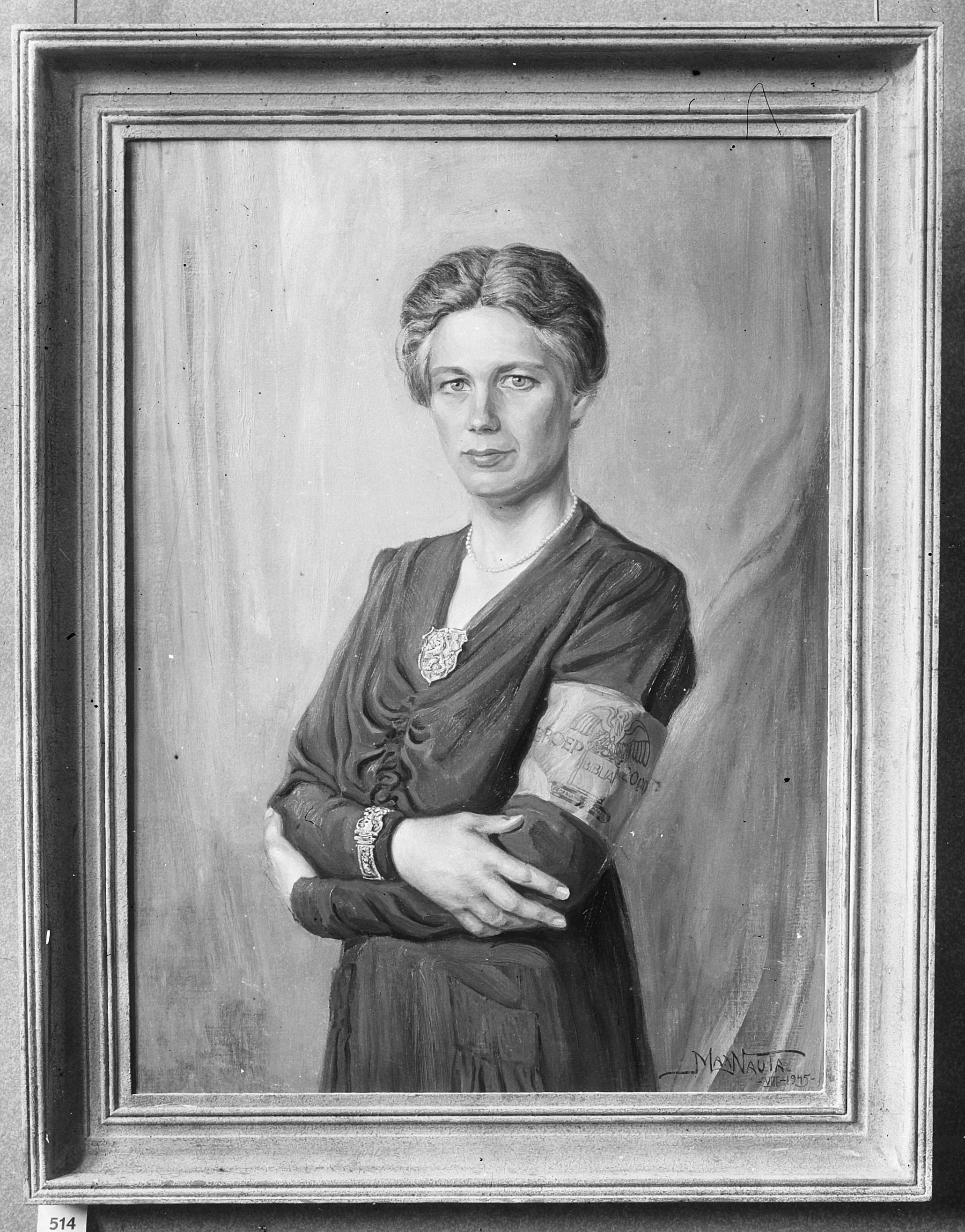
- Portrait of Jacoba van Tongeren by Max Nauta
- Born: 14 October 1903; Tjimahi, Dutch East Indies
- Died: 15 September 1967 (aged 63); Bergen, The Netherlands
- Other name: 2000, The Coupon Queen
- Occupation: Social Worker
- Known for: Group 2000, resistance fighter
- Partner: Nel Wateler
- Parent(s): Hermannus van Tongeren and Jeanne Holle
- Relatives: Herman van Tongeren

Jacoba van Tongeren (14 October 1903, in Tjimahi near Bandung, Dutch East Indies – 15 September 1967, in Bergen, Netherlands) was a resistance fighter, the founder and leader of Group 2000, a resistance group during the Second World War. Jacoba van Tongeren is the only woman to have created and led a resistance group during the war. In 1990, Yad Vashem honoured Jacoba van Tongeren as Righteous Among the Nations.

== Early life ==
Jacoba van Tongeren was the daughter of Hermannus van Tongeren and Jeanne Holle. In her younger years, her father would raise her and this would have a bearing on the rest of her life. Her father was an engineer in the Royal Netherlands East Indies Army and as such responsible for building railway bridges in Sumatra, in the former Dutch East Indies. As a child, she would live together with her father in a moveable home for army officers in the tropical rainforest, close to the bridge under construction. She never went to primary school but received what we can call a ‘military education’ from her father. Part of that involved inculcating military norms and values, such as great discipline and sense of responsibility.

In 1916, the van Tongeren family returned to The Netherlands and from 1916 to 1922 Jacoba went to the Dutch Reformed Gymnasium in Amsterdam. This was a difficult time of social readjustment: after all, she had never lived in a family before, never had been to school and never been with peers. Still, these were the years that she made a good connection with her brother, Herman van Tongeren.

Next, she was trained as a nurse in Rotterdam. She could not complete her education; a streptococcal infection thwarted her ambitions in 1928. Instead, she spent seven years in a health resort in Groenekan and the tuberculosis wards in Amersfoort. Here, she met her life companion Nel Wateler. On return to Amsterdam, she worked as a social worker for Central Care for the Unemployed.

== Resistance work ==
At the beginning of the Second World War, she could still travel around the Netherlands as a social worker, in spite of the restrictions placed on ordinary citizens by the Nazi occupiers.

In 1939 Jacoba's father had received the titular rank of Major General. From the moment the war broke out, he was in danger, also in no small part because of his rank as Grand Master of the Freemasons for the Grand Orient of the Netherlands. The occupiers considered Freemasonry “inimical to the people”. Grand Masters had already been executed in Belgium, Rumania and Poland. Hermannus van Tongeren called on Jacoba to take the membership lists and other important masonic documents to safe locations. She could do this delivery work because as a social worker she faced no travel restrictions.

The founders of the resistance paper Vrij Nederland got her involved in resistance work. Vrij Nederland was one of the first underground publications. The young producers of VN were attempting to make contact with the Freemason's Grand Master via his daughter, Jacoba. The plan was to set up an espionage group, which would inform the Dutch people by countering German propaganda. Initially, Hermannus was reluctant to join but he then changed his mind and gave a typewriter and a mimeograph for the production of VN's first edition. After the first edition had been published (on 31 August 1940), he increased his support, offering not only money but also contacts within the masonic network. When that required travelling, he would ask his daughter Jacoba. As a result, she became acquainted with many masonic brothers and this was to benefit her resistance work in the following years. In October 1940, her father was arrested by the Germans. He died in Sachsenhausen in March 1941.

In the same spring of 1941, the Germans arrested sixty-five people who had been working for the underground press. Most of them worked for VN. Jacoba lost all her contacts within that publication. She broke all further contact with VN, to ensure that no one would hear about the contacts between the paper and the Freemasons.

In 1941, the Germans abolished the Central Care for the Unemployed. All social workers were redeployed by the Dutch Churches at ‘Special Family Care’, which was run by the Churches. The first demand of the Special Family Care board was that this work was not to be endangered, in other words: no one was to antagonize the occupier. However, Jacoba was prepared to work on requests for help that were illegal. The board asked her to take care of all cases that were not related to social work. In short, she was asked to carry out resistance work.

Van Tongeren focused her work on helping people who had gone into hiding. This was dangerous work that could get you executed if caught. She created an organisation that would help people in hiding and would lead this group throughout the war.

There were many reasons to go into hiding. Being Jewish and wanting to avoid deportation to the camps was one, being in the resistance was another. But there were also men in hiding who refused to do forced labour in Germany. By the end of World War II, there were 350,000 people in hiding.

This large number of people needed places to stay. They also needed false identity papers and food coupons. Food, clothes, and many other things had been placed under a tight distribution system. Special fighting squads would attack the distribution offices, in order to steal those food coupons. All this required tight organisation.

Groep 2000 helped many Jewish people. Ten members of the group were themselves Jewish. After the war, about ten members and workers from that group received the Yad Vashem medal, including Jacoba van Tongeren.

At the beginning of the war, Jacoba's group had no name. Later, it became Groep 2000. There were 150 members, which made it a medium-sized resistance group among the dozens that were operating at the time. In 1944 and 1945, the group helped 4,500 people who were in hiding, which is significant.

Groep 2000 was working throughout the country but the main activities were in Amsterdam. Two institutions supported her in secret: the Dutch Reformed Church and the Freemasons.

Moving the food coupons around the country was a task that Jacoba took upon herself with regular intervals. She had designed a special vest for it; the pattern still exists. She wore it under her clothes and when it had been filled up with coupons she merely looked like a pregnant or rather large woman. These coupons transports earned her the nickname Coupon Queen.

Early September 1944, the government and the Interior Army (the joint resistance forces in The Netherlands, created in September 1944) demanded more cooperation among resistance groups. H.M. van Randwijk, in charge of Vrij Nederland at the time, attempted to wrest the leadership of Groep 2000 from van Tongeren but she refused. She proposed a merger of equals between her group and Vrij Nederland, which van Randwijk found unacceptable. In the end, the First Aid posts in Amsterdam and the fighting squad went to Vrij Nederland. The rest of Groep 2000 remained independent and continued to concentrate its efforts on helping people in hiding.

Van Tongeren's father had taught her the use of secret codes. He had also impressed on her to keep names and addresses hidden and never take notes. Instead, she used coded correspondence to find addresses for people who needed a safe place. She designed a numerical code, which corresponded to the members of Groep 2000, the people in hiding and all addresses. Only she and one other person knew the key to that code. In March 1945, the Germans got hold of the group's entire coded administrative system but they could not decode it. As a result, the hiding places of 4,500 people were never discovered.

== After the war ==
On 23 July 1945, van Tongeren gave to Prince Bernhard of Lippe-Biesterfeld, the commander of the Interior Army, a document that was entitled Brief historical report of the activities of Groep 2000 (Beknopt historisch verslag van de werkzaamheden van Groep 2000).

But she needed to mind her health; at the end of the war she was weak and ill. She took a year's rest and then continued her occupation as a social worker. But from 1950 onwards, she was chronically ill and bed-ridden. The war had exhausted her and the streptococcal infection from the 1930s and 40s had returned.

For health reasons she moved to Bergen, near the North Sea, halfway through the 1950s. Other surviving members of Groep 2000 urged her to make public all information about their activities, to which she consented. In 1965, she gave an interview to Trouw, another newspaper born from wartime resistance. She then set about writing her memoirs, sending them to a famous public radio pastor, Mr Klamer. She died before she could publish them in full. The hand-written memoirs were archived and remained unknown for almost half a century.

Jacoba van Tongeren, Groep 2000 and its 150 members have remained virtually unknown, in part because of Jacoba's modesty and her post-war ill health. But the fact that the group was working entirely in code did not help matters either. Wartime camouflage also worked after the war. Only in 2015, when the book ‘Jacoba van Tongeren and the unknown resistance heroes of Groep 2000', was published, the veil was lifted. It was based on the memoirs, which were discovered by accident by a son of Jacoba van Tongeren's brother. Only then a full picture of the organisation began to emerge: the group had been invisible for 70 years.

== Relevance of her work ==
In a 21 March 2015 lecture, Marjan Schwegman, director of the NIOD Institute for War, Holocaust and Genocide Studies at the Royal Netherlands Academy of Sciences explained the importance of the work done by van Tongeren and Groep 2000. The lecture was entitled 'Jacoba van Tongeren, a resistance fighter in spite of herself' and coincided with the presentation of van Tongeren's biography. The salient points were these:

- Helping people in hiding was punishable by death. Still, this work was not considered to be ‘real’ resistance work. In this way, many women who took care of people in hiding, were not recognised as resistance fighters.
- Van Tongeren led a double life, combining a legal existence and an illegal one, social work and resistance work. There were many more men and women who used the legal position in ordinary society as a cover for their illegal work in Groep 2000: pastors, policemen, nurses, local government officials.
- The questions that these memoirs raise have given occasion for a new research agenda. Clearly, there is still some unknown history that needs to be uncovered. The NIOD's new research program will highlight the role of women in the resistance movement.
- Publishing her memoirs has led to fresh public debate about the need to shed more light on the role of women in the resistance movement .

== Publications ==
- Jacoba van Tongeren (1945: first edition 1945, 89 blz; edition March 1946, 100 blz), Beknopt Historisch Verslag van de werkzaamheden van Groep 2000 = Concise historical record of the work of Group 2000, digital version available: www.niod.nl → Library → category via library catalogue; Van Tongeren. In Dutch.
- Jacoba van Tongeren (1945), Het aandeel van de Vrijmetselarij inde werkzaamheden van Groep 2000 = The share of Freemasonry in the work of Group 2000, lecture for the Amsterdam Masons Lodge on November 8, 1945, 30 pages, Sets Orders of Freemasons (CMC), the cultural Masonic Centre, the Hague. In Dutch.
- Loe de Jong, dr., Het Koninkrijk der Nederlanden in de Tweede Wereldoorlog = The Kingdom of the Netherlands in World War II, in particular the parts 7, second half and 10b, first half, The Hague. In Dutch.
- Koedijk, Paul en Gerard, Inventory Vrij Nederland archive, archive number 185, NIOD. In Dutch.
