= North Cimahi =

North Cimahi Kecamatan Cimahi Utara
- District
- Interactive map of North Cimahi
- Coordinates: 6°52′59″S 107°32′29″E
- Country: Indonesia
- Province: West Java
- City: Cimahi

Population (2014)
  - Total: 158,633
- Time zone: UTC+07.00 (WIB)
- Postal Code: 40511–40514

North Cimahi is a district of Cimahi, West Java, Indonesia. North Cimahi had a population of 158,633 in 2014.

== Villages ==
North Cimahi is divided into four villages:

- Cipageran (40511)
- Citeureup (40512)
- Cibabat (40513)
- Pasirkaliki (40514)
