= Group 2000 =

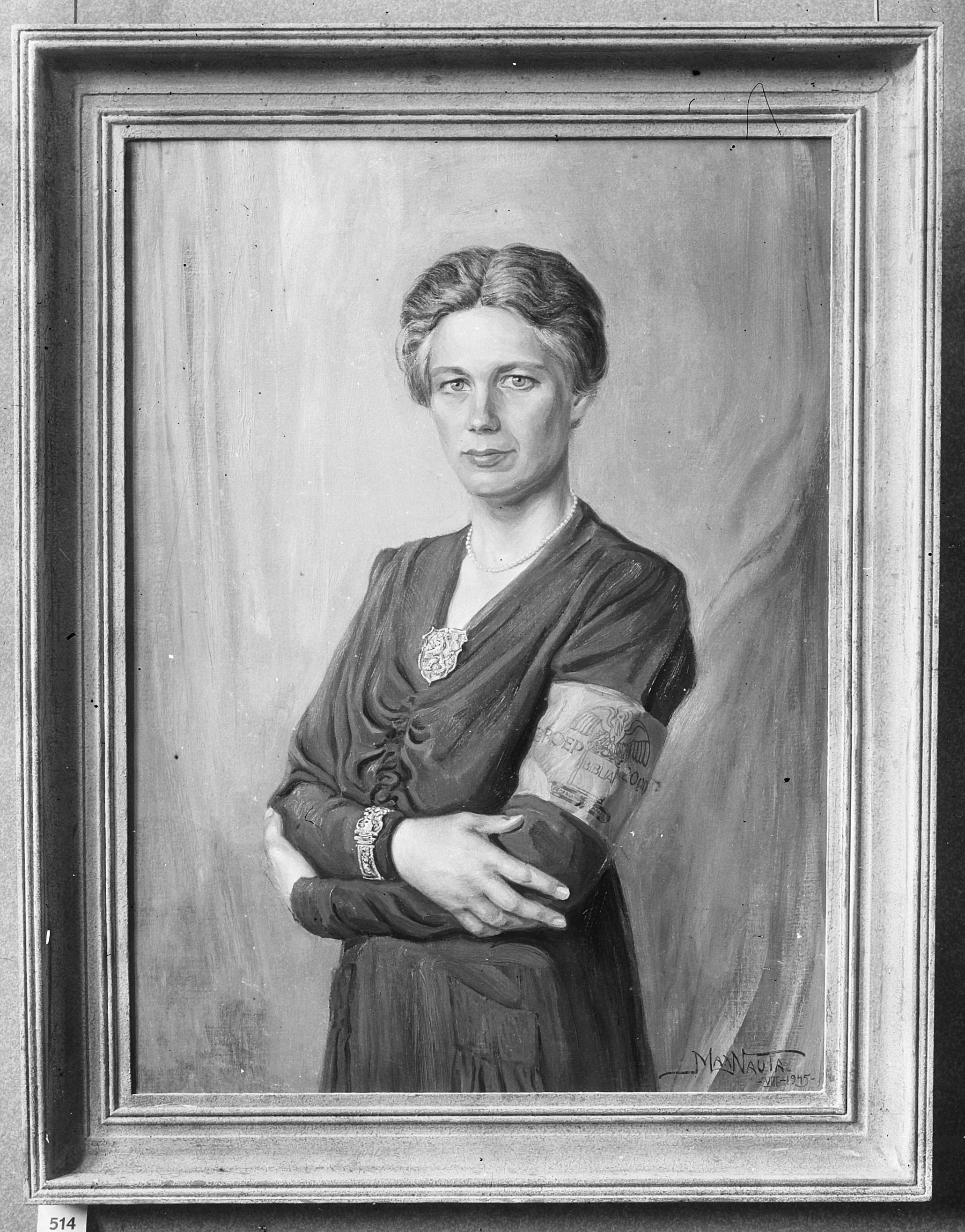
Portrait of Group 2000 co-founder and leader Jacoba van Tongeren, whose codename was 'Ms. 2000'. She wears the Group 2000 armband with a coat of arms and the group name. Painting by Max Nauta, dated August 1945.

Group 2000 (Dutch: Groep 2000) was a Dutch resistance group during the Second World War in the Amsterdam area and remained virtually unknown for 70 years. The Group was founded in 1940 and was led by Ms. Jacoba van Tongeren during the entire war. For the duration of the Second World War she provided food coupons for around 4,500 people in hiding. Group 2000 had more than 140 members who, together with the people in hiding, remained invisible during the war, and also afterwards, through the use of 4-number codenames. This changed only in 2015, after the book ‘Jacoba van Tongeren and the unknown resistance heroes of Group 2000’ was published.

== Origin ==
The founder of Group 2000, Jacoba van Tongeren, was an ecclesiastical social worker of the Dutch Reformed Church. Born in 1903, she was educated since her childhood in discipline and secrecy by her father Hermannus van Tongeren, a high officer in the Dutch colonial army (KNIL). Immediately after the capitulation in May 1940 he involved her in his first resistance activities. At the same time she was approached by the co-founders of the illegal magazine Vrij Nederland, Jan van der Neut and Frans Hofker. They started setting up the resistance newspaper, supported materially and financially by Hermannus van Tongeren, who also helped with the contacts of the Freemasons. At the request of the Reformed Church, Jacoba van Tongeren became social worker in charge of maintaining contact with the resistance. Her contact with the Amsterdam Church Council was Dr. Bernard Aris. Through her position she could travel freely through the country and she laid a nationwide network of contacts. This led to the resistance group becoming a national network from the beginning.

In the spring of 1941, dozens of members from, among others, Vrij Nederland were arrested. ‘Free the Netherlands’ and the resistance group split up and went their own way. Free the Netherlands as resistance newspaper Vrij Nederland and Group 2000 through helping people in hiding. Jacoba van Tongeren herself also went into hiding and came to the conclusion that all members of the Group should know as little as possible about each other and that the Group should no longer use real names, as her father always had held up. Based on what her father had taught her about intelligence years before, she developed a code system. From now on, every Group 2000 member was only referred to by a code number. This coding is the reason that during the entire World War II the group and all 4500 people in hiding were never unmasked. In March 1945, the Germans occupied the Group's headquarters and found thousands of coded names and addresses. However, they could not crack the code and the resistance fighters and people in hiding remained safe. Due to the code, members were anonymous during the war, but also afterwards: no one knew who was who.

== Group activities and departments ==
The management of Group 2000 was formed by the Management Committee consisting of Ab Abas, Frits van Meer and Jacoba van Tongeren as executive manager. The Daily Board existed in 1944 of Harry Mouthaan, Kees Reitema and Jacoba van Tongeren. Each member was given his own task according to his position and was only accountable to Jacoba van Tongeren.

In mid-1941, the Group was formed to help the growing number of people in hiding: Jews hiding in order to escape deportation, people who opposed the persecution of the Jews and the German domination, and men who evaded forced labor in Germany. For these people, hiding places had to be found every month. For this, use was made of the large ecclesiastical network that Jacoba had set up and the many contacts with the Freemasons.

For all people in hiding, food coupons were needed, which were obtained in various ways: at the distribution offices themselves and by robbery at distribution offices. A brigadier of police managed the food coupons depot and used his position to acquire extra coupons. Several others took care of the distribution of the coupons, bringing them to Amsterdam areas. Part of the transport of these coupons were taken care of by Jacoba van Tongeren. She had a special ‘coupon vest’ in which 5,000 coupons could be transported, which gave her the title 'The Queen of Coupons' (De Bonnenkoninging). Others still brought food packages to the Jews in the prisoner camps of Vught, Westerbork, Bergen-Belsen, or to persons in hiding. Among them is Truus Wijsmuller, who personally arranged to help 600 Jewish children escape Austria in 1938, and 500 of them continuing their journey to England.

People in hiding also needed identification cards, and another department of Group 2000 provided these. They managed the registration of those in need of IDs, the production, distribution. One member, Gerrit Jan van der Veen, known by his code name ‘2200’, later controlled the Personal Identity Center that created about 80,000 identity cards.

In addition, the Group organized many more activities to carry out the resistance work. Crucial tasks were the so-called ‘district-work’, the Red Cross department, and providing security. The district-work took care of the delicate and efficient communication and coupon distribution from centralised places to local neighbourhoods. The local Red Cross department was led by one doctor, the first aid and medical care by another one, and there were 16 more doctors and nurses involved. The Group counted a dozen couriers, as well as drivers for food transport. Security was the responsibility of guards, who overlooked hauling of food and goods, and provided 24/7 security at food depots. A combat team of about 10 members was responsible for more proactive, armed resistance. Group 2000 also secured a place for the Marine Transmission Station, an important strategic asset to receive messages from England and distribute the news all over the Netherlands. Ministers offered spiritual and moral support to the resistance fighters and people in hiding.

Group 2000 was represented at the highest level of the resistance: the national Council of Resistance. The activities cost more and more money. Hermannus van Tongeren already provided a large sum in 1940 from the Freemasons. Isaac Troostwijk continued this support in the middle of 1942. Of these 600,000 guilders (the equivalent of about 4 million euros in 2015), Group 2000 funded many of its own activities, and provided substantial start-up subsidies for other organisations like Vrij Nederland, the Personal Identity Center and the National Support Fund.

== The Group and its members ==
The Group was supported by the Order of Freemasons, and counted about ten Freemasons among its members. Another supporter was the Dutch Reformed Church. A lot of members belonged to this church, and of more than ten ministers in the Group, most were Reformed. There were ten Jewish members. More than ten members and employees had made great efforts to aid Jewish people in hiding and later received the Yad Vashem medal. The Group counted men and women of all ages, roughly in the proportion of men:women as 5:3. One finds a great diversity of professions: from fur trimmer and glass blower to banker and sculptor. Many of the Group members practiced their profession during the war, visible to the occupier. But in the meantime they performed invisible resistance work. By the end of the war, 18 Group members were murdered by the Nazis.

== Relative obscurity of Group 2000 ==
There are several reasons why the group remained unknown to all except a few during the war and for 70 years after 1945. The most important reason is the secret code by which all members were known. The extense of the network and the individual identities of members were beyond the grasp of all those who were involved, except Jacoba van Tongeren and one assistant, the only ones who assigned and knew code names. The code proved extremely effective and useful during the war. It was also the reason that the group was not very visible after the war. The name “Group 2000” itself contributed further to this invisibility.

Another reason is that Dutch historians who wrote about the Second World War considered ‘resistance’ to be primarily those activities that actively fought against the German occupiers and that disadvantaged them. Espionage, sabotage and fighting groups were considered to be part of that endeavour, but helping persons in hiding was not. The deeds of heroic, tough men was extensively documented, but much less so the work of female resistance fighters, who were messengers or did various other tasks like those of Group 2000. The role of women in resistance remained underexposed.

Finally, the leader, Jacoba van Tongeren herself, was very modest and did not boast about the Group’s efforts during the war. In 1945, she only delivered a rather formal, factual report to the Dutch queen's consort, also General and supreme commander of the army, Prince Bernard of Lippe-Biesterfeld. What made things worse, is that van Tongeren became chronically ill and was bedridden during many of the remaining years of her life. Shortly before she died, in 1967, she wrote an extensive, deeply personal account of her ‘Memories’ to a pastor of a national radio station. But her report was filed and discovered only in 2013 by her cousin Paul van Tongeren. Quoting extensively from Jacoba’s ‘Memories’, he and Trudy Admiraal wrote the book ‘Jacoba van Tongeren en de onbekende verzetshelden van Groep 2000’, which appeared in 2015. For 70 years the Group had remained invisible. The publication lifted the veil of obscurity for the descendants of many Group members, who often knew only bits and pieces of the full story of their (great)grandfathers and – mothers, and for others who had an as yet incomplete picture of resistance in Amsterdam and many other parts of The Netherlands from 1940 to 1945.

== Bibliography ==
- Jan Driever (2015,) The mutual promise: seventy years of foundation 1940-1945, Uitgeverij: Boom, Amsterdam, ISBN 90-8953-206-4. (in Dutch)
- Israel Gutman ed. (2005), Righteous among the Nations; Dutch with a Yad Vashem award for help to Jews (in Dutch), Publisher: Veen, Amsterdam, ISBN 90-2040-278-1, pp 97,203,736,867. (in Dutch)
- Max de Haan (2015), "Hermannus van Tongeren, a commendable man ", pp 32–38, reference on http://www.profdrmaxdehaanlegacy.nl. (in Dutch)
- Peter H. Heere and Arnold Th. Vernooij (2005), De Eerebegraafplaats in Bloemendaal, Sdu Publishers, The Hague, pp 860–879. (in Dutch)
- Loe de Jong, dr., The Kingdom of the Netherlands in the Second World War, especially the parts 7, 8 and 10b, The Hague. (in Dutch)
- Els Kloek (2016), 101 Women and the War, Publisher: Vantilt, Nijmegen, ISBN 978 90 8248 820 3, pp 156–157. (in Dutch)
- Paul Koedijk and Gerard Mulder, Inventory of the Archives of the Free Netherlands, archive number 185a, NIOD. (in Dutch)
- Gerard Mulder and Paul Koedijk (1988), H.M. van Randwijk, Publishers: Raamgracht, Amsterdam, ISBN 90-6287-994-2, pp 416–430. (in Dutch)
- Ton Schulten (1995), Resistance in the Netherlands, 1940-1945, Publisher: Sdu, The Hague, ISBN 90-1208-190- 4. (in Dutch)
- Marjan Schwegman (1980), The Silent Resistance: Women in Illegal Organizations: Netherlands 1940-1945, Number 2 of ASVA / SUA script series, Publisher: Socialistiese, Amsterdam, ISBN 90-6222-059-2, pp 57–60. (in Dutch)
- Bianca Stigter (2005), The occupied city; Map of Amsterdam 1940-1945, Publisher: Athenaeum-Polak & Van Gennep, Amsterdam, ISBN 90-2534-988-9, pp 34, 45, 99, 132, 190 (in Dutch)
- Jacoba van Tongeren (1945: first edition July 1945, 89 pages, edition March 1946, 100 pages), Concise Historical Report on the activities of Group 2000, digital publication available: www.niod.nl → heading Library → via Library catalog Van Tongeren. (in Dutch)
- Jacoba van Tongeren (1945), The Freemasonry's share in the activities of the Group 2000, lecture for the Amsterdam Freemasons Lodge on 8 November 1945, 30 pages, Collections Orders of Freemasons (CMC), The Cultural Masonic Center, The Hague. (in Dutch)
