= Widya Saputra =

Indonesian TV presenter (born 1985)

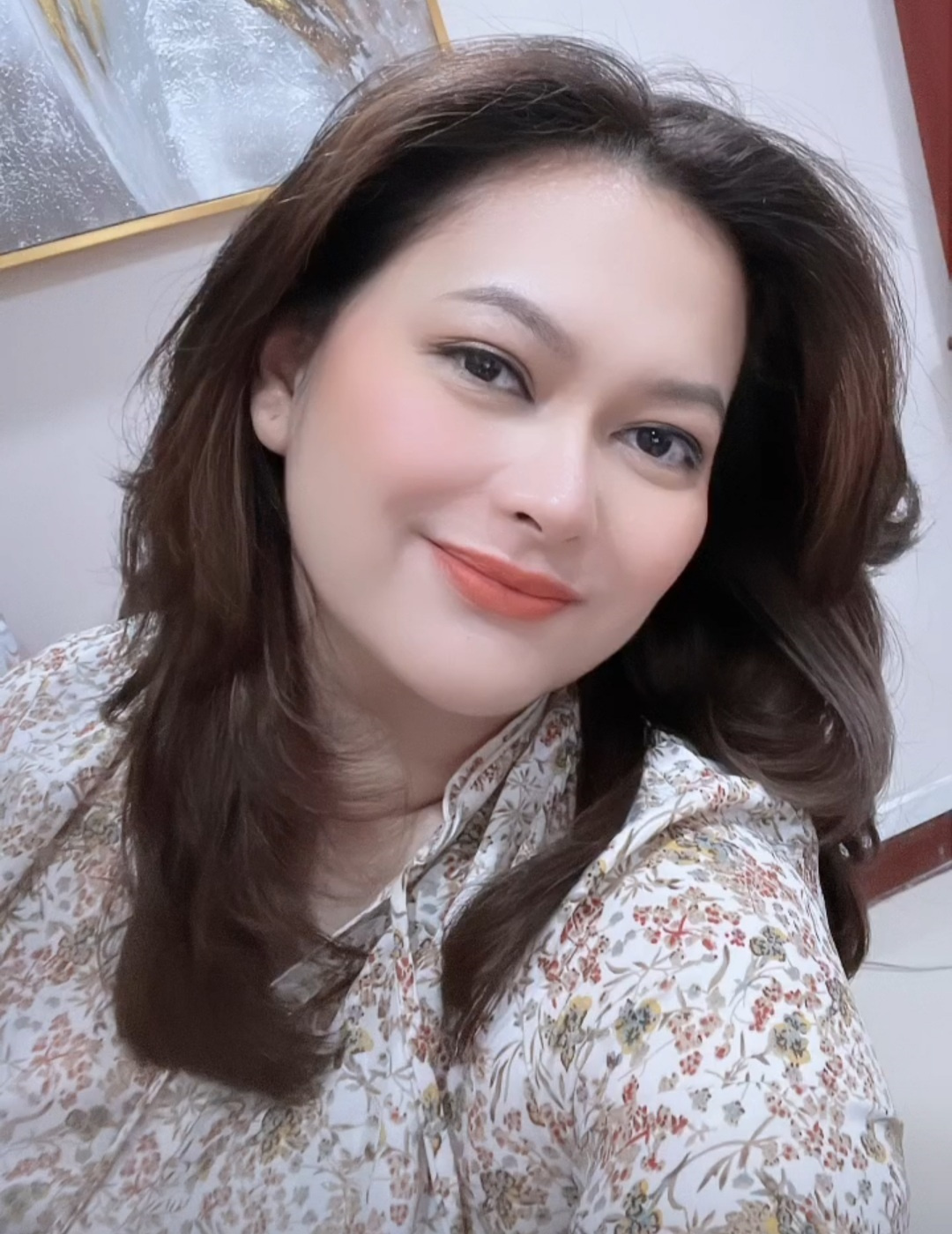
- Born: Widyaningrum Surya Nugraha; February 26, 1985 (age 41); Cimahi, West Java, Indonesia
- Other name: Widya Cat Lady
- Education: Universitas Padjadjaran
- Occupation: Presenter
- Years active: 1993–present
- Height: 167 cm (5 ft 6 in)
- Spouse: Dodi Saputra (m. 2010; div. 2012)
- Sports commentary career
- Genre: Sportscaster
- Sports: MotoGP, Association football, Boxing
- Employer: Trans 7 (2003–2008); Metro TV (2010–present)

Widyaningrum Surya Nugraha (born February 26, 1985; known professionally as Widya Saputra) is an Indonesian TV presenter. Since 2006, she is perhaps best known as the presenter of MotoGP World Championship on the television broadcaster Trans 7. As of April 2010, she is a Metro TV presenter for the sport news program MetroSport.

== Profile ==
Born in Cimahi on 26 February 1985, her basic elementary education was completed in Cimahi. She graduated from Universitas Padjadjaran, faculty of communication, majoring in communication management. Widya hobbies are singing, reading, and browsing the internet. Her friends call her Cat Lady. On 13 February 2010, she married Dodi Saputra. They were marriage until early November 2012, when they divorced.

== Career ==
In 1993 she began singing in the Trio Laris group, and won HDX Awards. She stayed with this group until 1997. Widya won Gadis Gemilang Shower to Shower, that was promoted by Gadis magazine. In 1998, she following Cover Girl Top Guest Baby-G, that performed by Aneka magazine, later Widya is won the title from this event.

Her debut in television started in 1998. She became a presenter at Kring-Kring Olala in TPI. She stayed in this program until 2001. She became a model and advertising star for many products like Dago Cellular, Biore Anti Acne, Misyelle Shoes, and Logo Clothing Co.

Beginning in 2000, Widya became a presenter for many TV stations starting with Musiq in TVRI, and later with TV other programs on national and local television. In 2003 she became a Guest VJ MTV in MTV's Special Ramadhan program on GlobalTV. She started her acting career in the soap opera, Puteri Keempat in RCTI with fellow actors, Tya Ariestya and Irfan Hakim. And in 2006, Widya was listed in Pocong 1 as a supporting actress.

Now Widya is sports presenter in Trans7. Firstly in 2003 she became as presenter of Calcio Action Serie-A in SCTV. Since 2004 until 2008, Widya stay in TV7 (later Trans7), with presenting many sports event such as Drag Mania, Quiz Liga Inggris, and WSBK. From 2006 to 2008 she began as MotoGP presenter in Trans7, except in 2 last races 2008 season, when she must coverage Asian Beach Games in Bali, and she replaced by Lucy Wiryono. In 2007-08 seasons, Widya got a new challenge as Lega Calcio Serie-A Match presenter.

== Experience ==
=== Filmography ===
- 2003 – Puteri Keempat (soap opera)
- 2006 – Pocong 1 (film)

=== TV programs ===
- 1998 – Kring-Kring Olala (TPI - until 2001)
- 2001 – Musiq (TVRI)
- 2002 – Bidik (ANTV)
- 2003 – Calcio Action Serie-A (SCTV), MTV Special Ramadhan (Global TV)
- 2004-2005 – Drag Mania, Premier League, WTA Tournament Bali, Otomotive Night Race, Tennis Challenge Hemaviton, WSBK (TV7)
- 2005 – Motor Impian (TPI), Auto Glitz (Jak TV)
- 2006 – Clasakustik (Indosiar)
- 2006-2008 – MotoGP (Trans7 – except two last race 2008 season)
- 2007-2009 – Liga Italia Serie-A (Trans7)
- 2008 – Asian Beach Games (ESPN), Speedy Tour d’Indonesia (Trans7)
- 2008-2009 – Liga Dunia (Trans7)
- 2010 - MetroSport (MetroTV)
