= Cimahi =

City in West Java, Indonesia

- City
- City of Cimahi; Kota Cimahi

Other transcription(s)
  - Sundanese: ᮓᮚᮩᮂ ᮎᮤᮙᮠᮤ
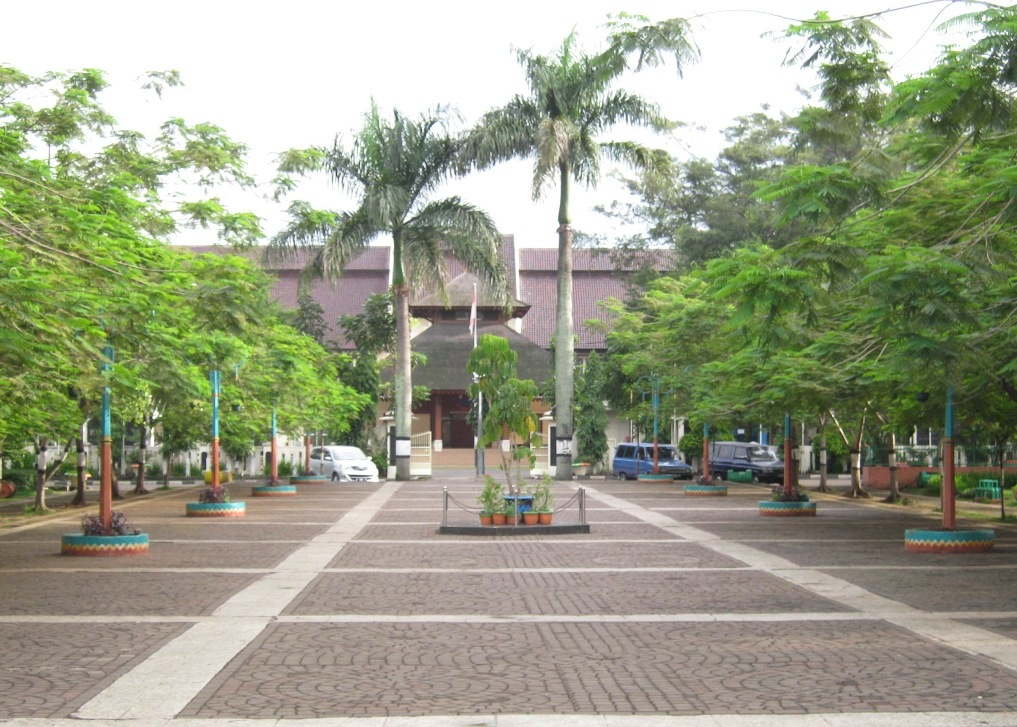
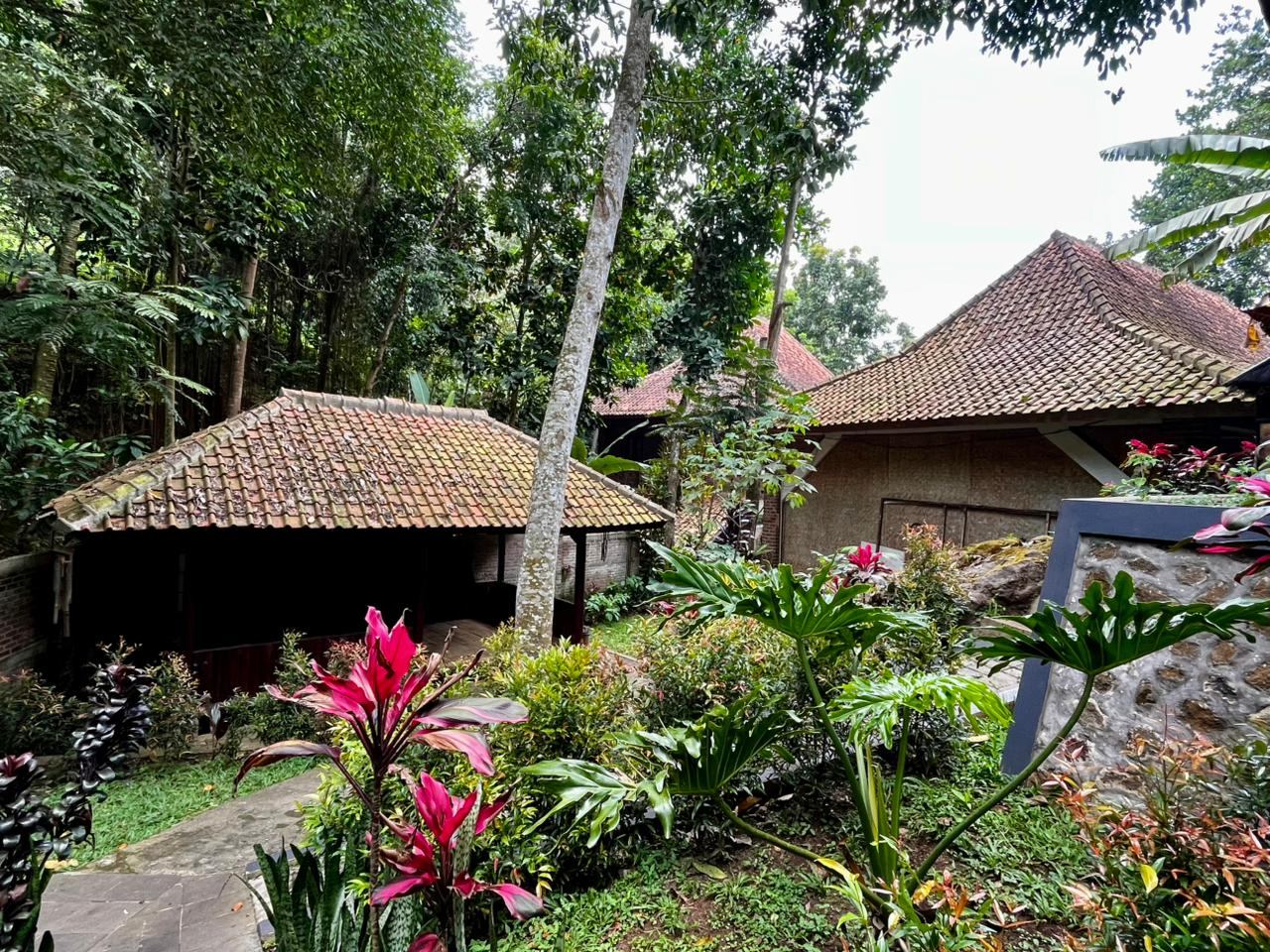
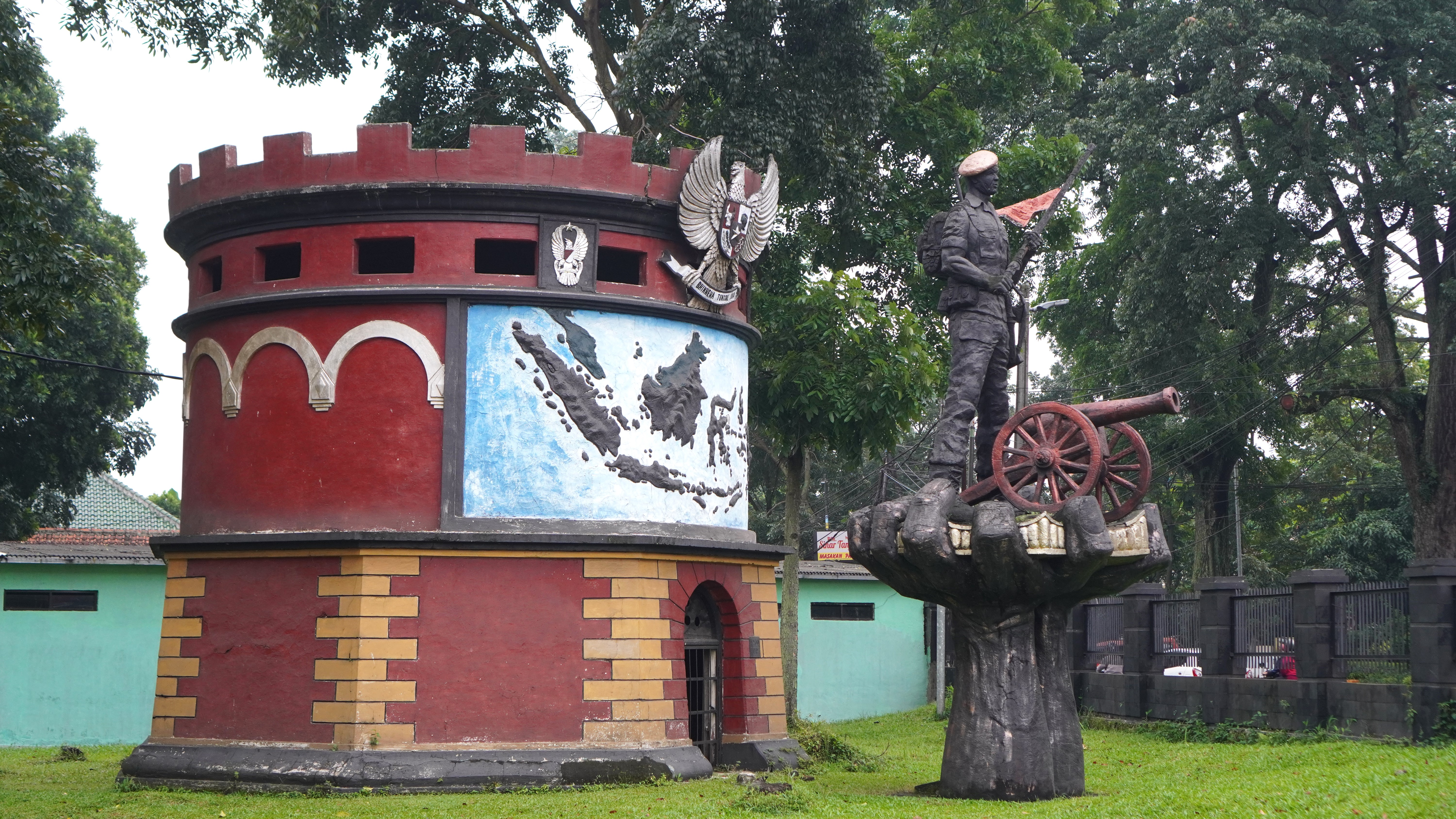
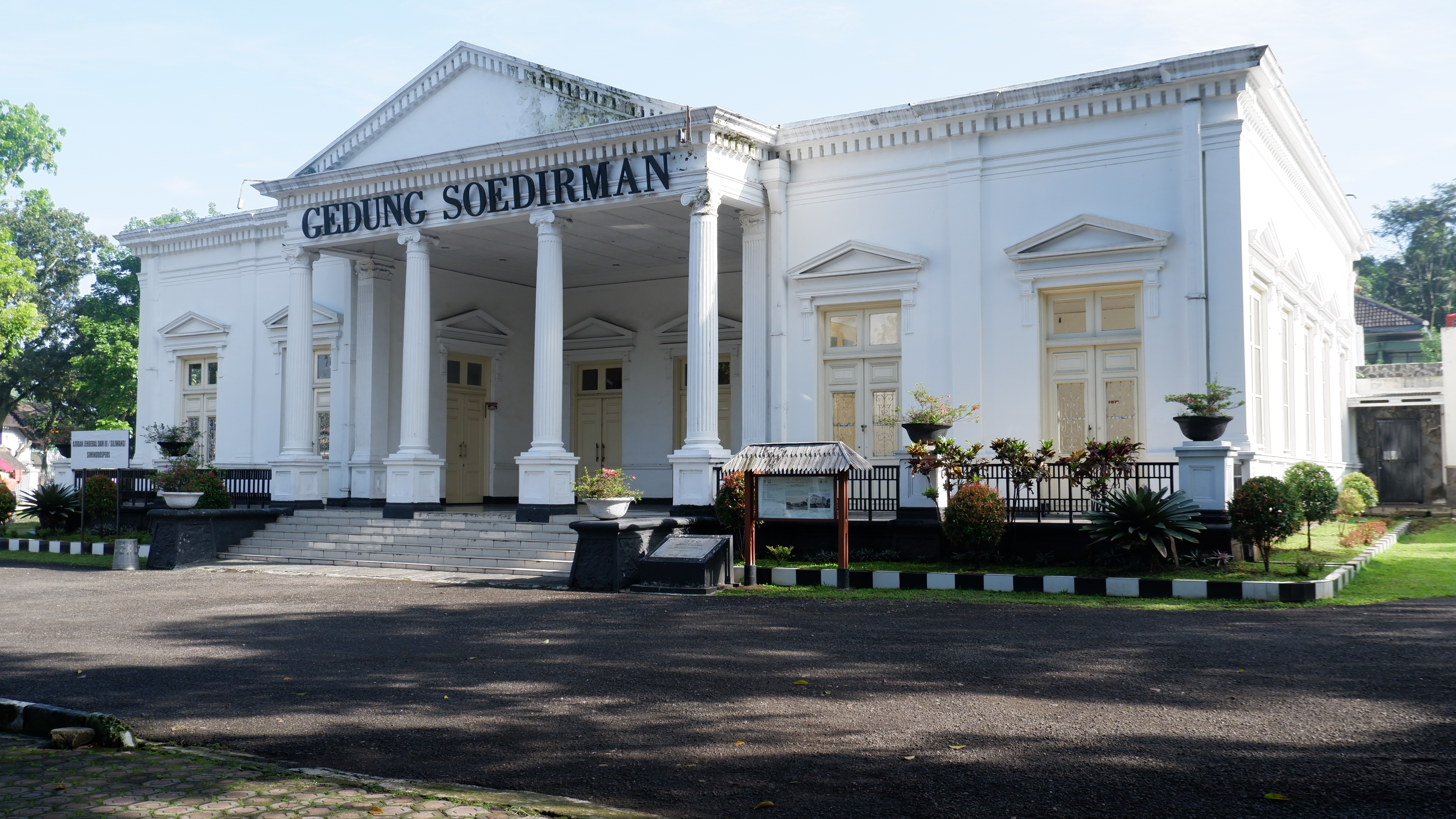
- From clockwise top: Cimahi Town Square, Village of Cirendeu, Pusdikarmed Water well, Sudirman building

- Flag Coat of arms
- Nickname: Cimahi
- Motto: Saluyu Ngawangun Jati Mandiri (Sundanese) ᮞᮜᮥᮚᮥ ᮍᮝᮍᮥᮔ᮪ ᮏᮒᮤ ᮙᮔ᮪ᮓᮤᮛᮤ "Harmoniously walking together towards independent identity"
- Location within West Java

- Location in Java and Indonesia Cimahi City (Indonesia)
- Coordinates: 6°52′16″S 107°33′17″E
- Country: Indonesia
- Province: West Java
- Metropolitan area: Bandung Basin
- Established: 18 October 2001

Government
  - Mayor: Ngatiyana
  - Vice Mayor: Adhitia Yudisthira

Area
  - Total: 42.42 km^{2} (16.38 sq mi)
- Elevation: 685 m (2,247 ft)

Population (mid 2024 estimate)
  - Total: 581,994
  - Density: 13,720/km^{2} (35,530/sq mi)
- Time zone: UTC+7 (Indonesia Western Time)
- Area code: +(62) 22
- Website: cimahikota.go.id

Cimahi (Indonesian pronunciation: [t͡ʃimahi]) is a landlocked city located immediately west of the larger city of Bandung, in West Java Province, Indonesia and within the Bandung Metropolitan Area. Note that the prefix "Ci" means "river" in Sundanese. It covers an area of 42.42 km^{2} and had a population at the 2010 Census of 541,177 and at the 2020 Census of 568,400; the official estimate as of mid-2024 was 581,994. The city is a major textile producer, and is home to several military training centres.

== Geography ==
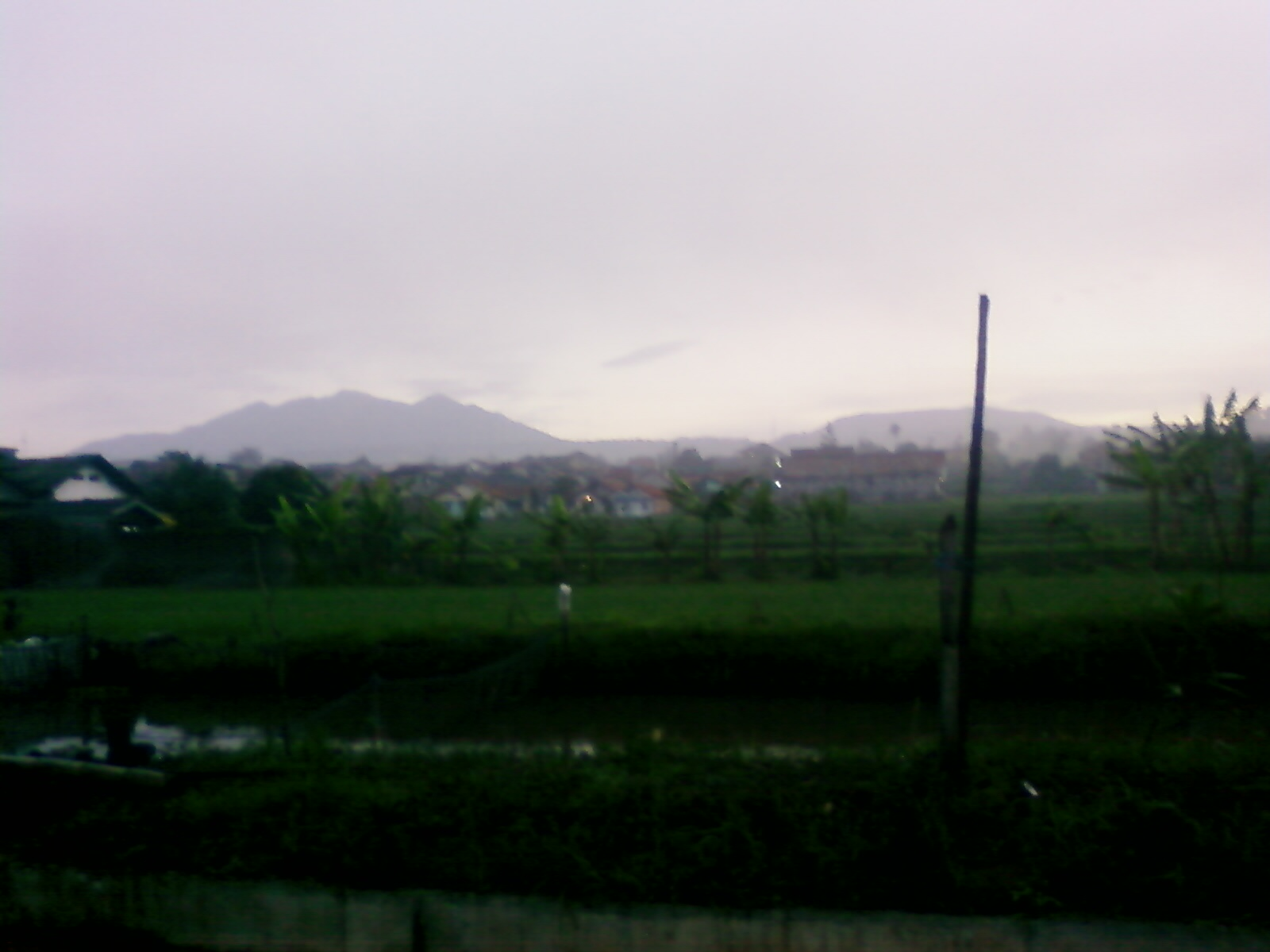
Tangkuban Perahu and Burangrang seen from Citeureup

Cimahi, located 135 km south east of Jakarta, is situated between Bandung and West Bandung Regency. Cimahi comprises three administrative districts (kecamatan), which in turn are sub-divided into fifteen urban villages (kelurahan). Its lowest elevation is 685 metres (2,247 ft) above sea level and directs to the Tarum River (or "CiTarum"). Its highest elevation is 1,040 metres (3,410 ft) above sea level, which is part of the slope of mount Tangkuban Perahu and Burangrang. The Cimahi River flows through the city and Cimahi also has two Springs, named Cikuda and Cisontok.

== History ==
The name Cimahi was taken from the Cimahi river that flows through the city. The word originated from the Sundanese language and literally means "enough water". Residents of Cimahi get their water supply from the river.

Cimahi's prominence increased in 1811, when Governor-General Herman Willem Daendels constructed the Great Post Road. A checkpoint, known as Loji, was built in Cimahi Square. Between 1874 and 1893, the Cimahi rail station and a railroad connecting Bandung and Cianjur was built. The building of military training centers and other military buildings was started in 1886. Cimahi was granted district status in 1935. In 1975, Cimahi became the first administrative city in West Java and the third in Indonesia. Cimahi was then granted full city status in 2001.

== Administrative districts ==
The city of Cimahi is divided into three administrative districts (Indonesian: kecamatan), tabulated below with their areas and their populations at the 2010 Census and the 2020 Census, together with the official estimates as of mid-2024. An elected mayor leads the city administration. The table also includes the names of the administrative villages (all classed as urban kelurahan) in each district.

Kode Wilayah	Name of District (kecamatan)	Area in km^{2}	Pop'n Census 2010	Pop'n Census 2020	Pop'n Estimate mid 2024	Villages Kelurahan
32.77.01	Cimahi Selatan (South Cimahi)	17.41	230,623	240,990	242,420	Cibeber, Leuwigajah, Utama, Melong and Cibeureum
32.77.02	Cimahi Tengah (Central Cimahi)	10.89	163,070	161,758	165,969	Baros, Cigugur Tengah, Karangmekar, Setiamanah, Cimahi and Padasuka
32.77.03	Cimahi Utara (North Cimahi)	14.12	147,484	165,652	173,605	Cipageran, Citeureup, Cibabat and Pasirkaliki
	Total city	42.42	541,177	568,400	581,994	

Details of the 15 urban villages (kelurahan) are as follows:

Kode Wilayah	Name of kelurahan	Area in km^{2}	Pop'n Estimate mid 2024	Post code
32.77.01.1001	Melong	3.14	65,864	40534
32.77.01.1002	Cibeureum	2.57	62,337	40535
32.77.01.1003	Utama	4.00	35,161	40533
32.77.01.1004	Leuwigajah	4.05	48,178	40532
32.77.01.1005	Cibeber	3.65	30,880	40531
32.77.02.1001	Baros	2.825	20,822	40521
32.77.02.1002	Cigugur Tengah	2.362	47,685	40522
32.77.02.1003	Karangmekar	1.333	16,699	40523
32.77.02.1004	Setiamanah	1.179	24,151	40524
32.77.02.1005	Padasuka	2.620	42,677	40526
32.77.02.1006	Cimahi	0.575	13,935	40525
32.77.03.1001	Pasirkaliki	1.53	19,113	40514
32.77.03.1002	Cibabat	3.01	56,758	40513
32.77.03.1003	Citeureup	3.41	43,524	40512
32.77.03.1004	Cipageran	6.17	54,210	40511

== Climate ==
Cimahi has an elevation moderated tropical rainforest climate (Köppen Af) with moderate rainfall from June to September and heavy rainfall from October to May.

Climate data for Cimahi
Month	Jan	Feb	Mar	Apr	May	Jun	Jul	Aug	Sep	Oct	Nov	Dec	Year
Mean daily maximum °C (°F)	26.7 (80.1)	26.9 (80.4)	27.5 (81.5)	27.9 (82.2)	28.0 (82.4)	27.6 (81.7)	27.6 (81.7)	28.2 (82.8)	28.9 (84.0)	28.9 (84.0)	28.0 (82.4)	27.4 (81.3)	27.8 (82.0)
Daily mean °C (°F)	22.8 (73.0)	22.8 (73.0)	23.1 (73.6)	23.3 (73.9)	23.2 (73.8)	23.3 (73.9)	21.9 (71.4)	22.2 (72.0)	22.9 (73.2)	23.3 (73.9)	23.1 (73.6)	23.0 (73.4)	22.9 (73.2)
Mean daily minimum °C (°F)	18.9 (66.0)	18.7 (65.7)	18.7 (65.7)	18.7 (65.7)	18.4 (65.1)	17.0 (62.6)	16.3 (61.3)	16.3 (61.3)	16.9 (62.4)	17.7 (63.9)	18.2 (64.8)	18.6 (65.5)	17.9 (64.2)
Average rainfall mm (inches)	259 (10.2)	236 (9.3)	269 (10.6)	271 (10.7)	188 (7.4)	87 (3.4)	77 (3.0)	83 (3.3)	96 (3.8)	189 (7.4)	292 (11.5)	309 (12.2)	2,356 (92.8)
Source: Climate-Data.org

== Tourism ==
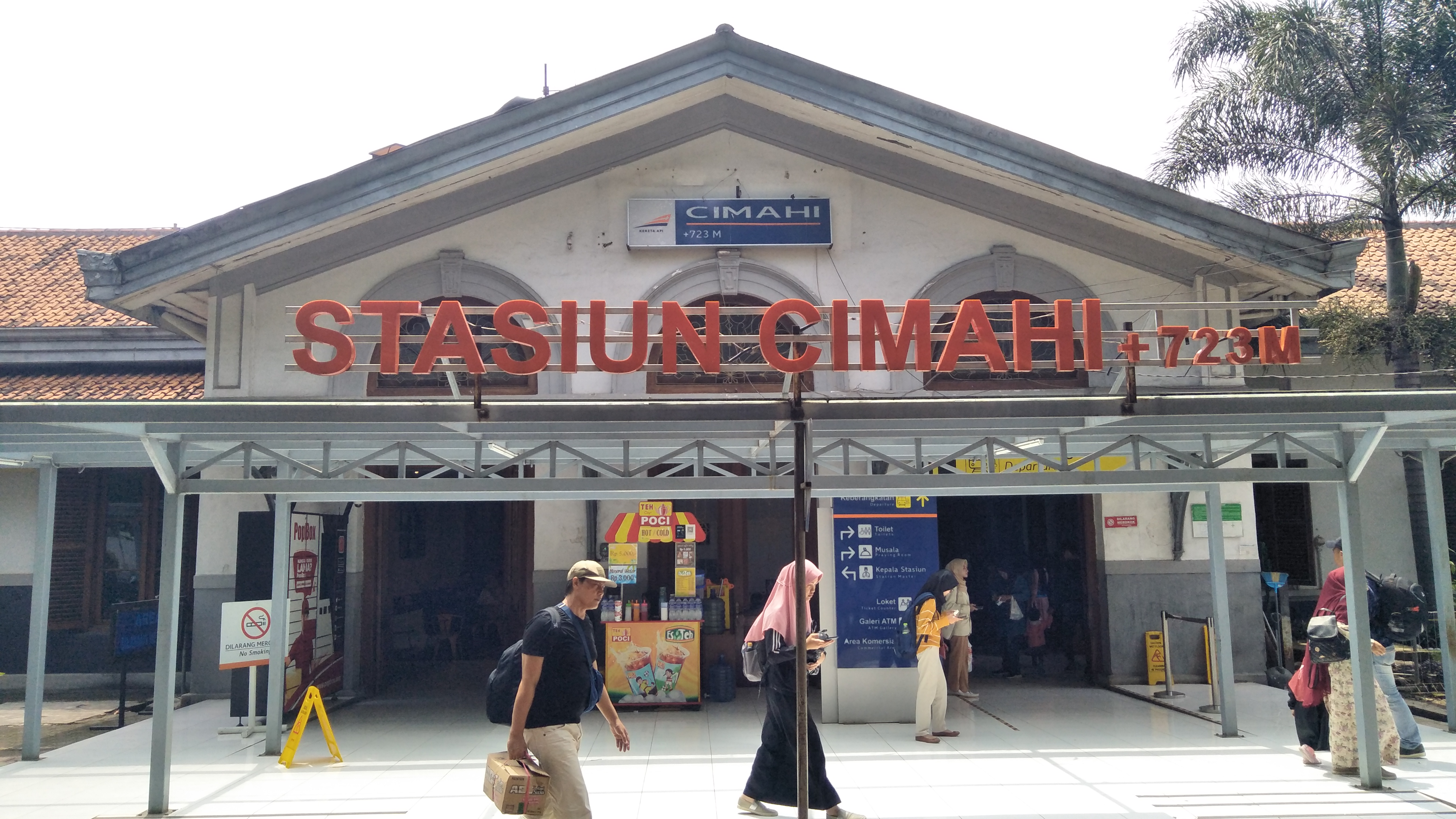
Cimahi Railway Station

Cimahi has various tourist hotspots, such as Alam Wisata Cimahi, Pandiga Recreation Sport, Rumah Pajang, Lembur Batik and Kampung Adat Cirendeu. According to the local tourist office, these offer distinctive experiences in nature, cuisine, handicrafts and traditional community. Additionally, there are some buildings of historical interest, such as Dustira Hospital, Ereveld Cemetery, Military Prison and Sudirman Building.

== Notable people ==
- Ariffien (1902–1976), Indonesian nationalist and film director
- Jacoba van Tongeren (1903–1967), social worker and Dutch resistance member
- Suardi Tasrif (1922–1991), journalist, author, and political advocate
- Bep Stenger (1922–2016), aid worker and resistance member
- Amir Machmud (1923–1995), former military general and politician
- Dries Holten (1936–2020), singer and songwriter
- Maria Hertogh (1937–2009), born in Tjimahi and the person at the centre of the 1950 Maria Hertogh riots in Singapore
- Jack Jersey (1941–1997), singer, composer, arranger, lyricist and record producer
- Siwi Sukma Adji (born 1962), former admiral and Chief of Staff of the Indonesian Navy
- Doni Monardo (born 1963), former military general and National Agency for Disaster Countermeasure chairman
- Sule (born 1976), comedian
- Widya Saputra (born 1985), television presenter
- Anthony Sinisuka Ginting (born 1996), badminton player
- Zalnando (born 1996), football player
