= Vrij Nederland =

Dutch magazine

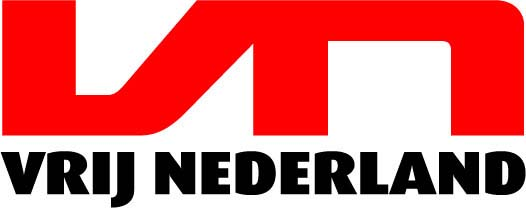
Logo

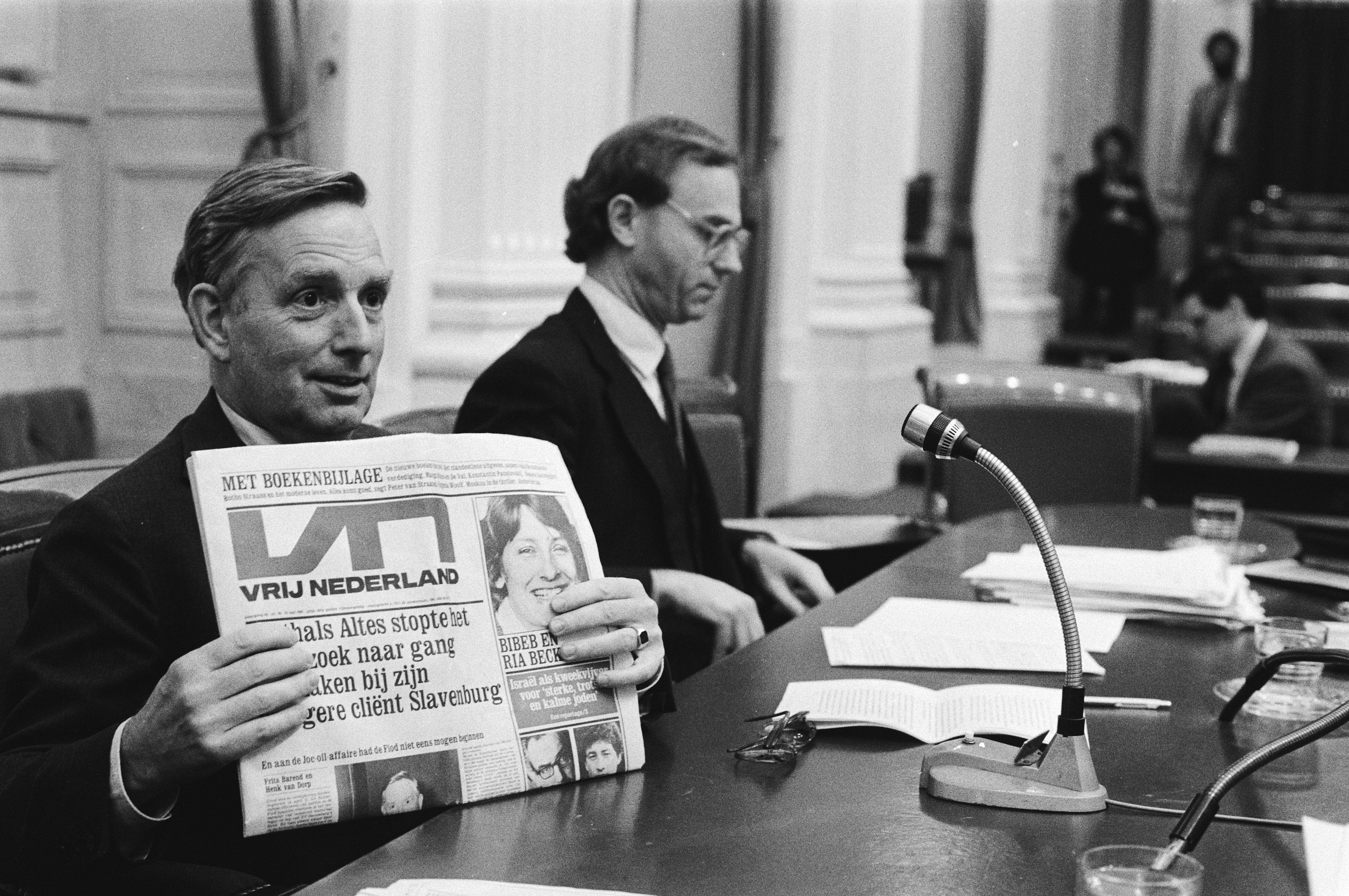
Minister Frits Korthals Altes with the Vrij Nederland (19 May 1983) at the Tweede Kamer, next to him Onno Ruding. Both are linked by Vrij Nederland Slavenburg's bank affair.

Vrij Nederland (Free Netherlands) is a Dutch magazine, established during the German occupation of the Netherlands in World War II as an underground newspaper. It has since grown into a magazine. The originally weekly turned monthly magazine in 2016 is traditionally intellectually left-wing. Over the years, it has become more centrist, in recent years reverting back to a generally progressive outlook on politics, social justice and climate, among other topics. It is one of the four most influential written media in its sector, along with Elsevier, De Groene Amsterdammer and HP/De Tijd, all with a dwindling readership. Publisher of Vrij Nederland is WPG Uitgevers in Amsterdam. The offices of Vrij Nederland are in the headquarters of WPG at Wibautstraat 133.

The first issue of Vrij Nederland was published on 31 August 1940. The chief editors were:

- 1940–1942: Frans Hofker
- 1941–1950: Henk van Randwijk
- 1950–1955: Johan Winkler
- 1955–1969: Mathieu Smedts
- 1969–1991: Rinus Ferdinandusse
- 1991–1997: Joop van Tijn
- 1998–2000: Oscar Garschagen
- 2001–2004: Xandra Schutte
- 2004–2005: Gerard van Westerloo (interim)
- 2005–2008: Emile Fallaux
- 2008–2015: Frits van Exter
- 2017–: Ward Wijndelts

Circulation:

- 1945: 109,000
- 1951: 35,000
- 1955: 19,000
- 1960: 23,000
- 1965: 36,950
- 1970: 81,378
- 1975: 109,381
- 1980: 111,857
- 1985: 97,132
- 1990: 76,947
- 1995: 92,134
- 2000: 55,947
- 2005: 49,244
- 2010: 48,353
- 2015: 22,937
- 2020: 17,043
- 2021: 15,542
