= List of Indonesian football transfers 2015 =

Below are player transfers for the 2015 Indonesia Super League and 2015 Liga Indonesia Premier Division.

Starting with the 2015 season, PT Liga applied a restriction for Indonesia Super League clubs to use maximum three foreign players and no foreign players for Liga Indonesia Premier Division clubs.

== Winter transfers ==
Name	Moving from	Moving to	Source
(Indonesia) Hansamu Yama	Free agent	Barito Putera	
(Indonesia) Paulo Sitanggang	Jember United	Barito Putera	
(Indonesia) Vendry Mofu	Sriwijaya	Semen Padang	
(Brazil) Beto	Arema Cronus	(Malaysia) Penang	
(Indonesia) Eddy Gunawan	Persela Lamongan	Barito Putera	
(Indonesia) Defri Rizky	Persija Jakarta	Mitra Kukar	
(Indonesia) Hamka Hamzah	(Malaysia) PKNS	Pusamania Borneo	
(Indonesia) Ahmad Noviandani	Persijap Jepara	Arema Cronus	
(Mali) Djibril Coulibaly	Persib Bandung	Semen Padang	
(Indonesia) Zulchrizal Abdul Gamal	Mitra Kukar	Semen Padang	
(Indonesia) Fachrudin Aryanto	Persepam Madura United	Sriwijaya	
(Indonesia) Yogi Triana	Persita Tangerang	Sriwijaya	
(Indonesia) Yongki Aribowo	Barito Putera	Pelita Bandung Raya	
(Brazil) Reinaldo Lobo	Mitra Kukar	(Malaysia) Penang	
(Mali) Morimakan Koïta	(Mali) Stade Malien	Sriwijaya	
(Indonesia) Dias Angga Putra	Pelita Bandung Raya	Persib Bandung	
(Indonesia) Titus Bonai	Persipura Jayapura	Sriwijaya	
(Indonesia) Patrich Wanggai	(Malaysia) T-Team	Sriwijaya	
(Indonesia) Evan Dimas	Free agent	Bhayangkara	
(Montenegro) Ilija Spasojević	Putra Samarinda	Persib Bandung	
(Brazil) Otávio Dutra	Gresik United	Bhayangkara	
(Indonesia) Siswanto	Sriwijaya	Bhayangkara	
(Indonesia) Bima Ragil	Persekap Pasuruan	Bhayangkara	
(Estonia) Martin Vunk	(Estonia) Nõmme Kalju	Persija Jakarta	
(Russia) Yevgeni Kabayev	(Estonia) Sillamäe Kalev	Persija Jakarta	
(Indonesia) Alfin Tuasalamony	Bhayangkara	Persija Jakarta	
(Indonesia) Muhammad Ilham	Bhayangkara	Persija Jakarta	
(Indonesia) Vava Mario Yagalo	Bhayangkara	Persija Jakarta	
(Indonesia) Rendy Irawan	Persik Kediri	Persija Jakarta	
(Indonesia) Syaiful Cahya	Persik Kediri	Persija Jakarta	
(Indonesia) Adam Alis	Martapura	Persija Jakarta	
(Indonesia) Novri Setiawan	Bhayangkara	Persija Jakarta	
(Indonesia) Bambang Pamungkas	Pelita Bandung Raya	Persija Jakarta	
(Indonesia) Greg Nwokolo	Bhayangkara	Persija Jakarta	
(Indonesia) Irsyad Maulana	Arema Cronus	Semen Padang	
(Indonesia) Sirvi Arvani	Persita Tangerang	Persepam Madura United	
(Indonesia) Ferdinand Sinaga	Persib Bandung	Sriwijaya	
(Indonesia) Ngurah Nanak	Persija Jakarta	Sriwijaya	
(Indonesia) Wildansyah	Pelita Bandung Raya	Sriwijaya	
(Indonesia) Dian Agus Prasetyo	Mitra Kukar	Sriwijaya	
(Indonesia) Muhammad Roby	Putra Samarinda	Barito Putera	
(Indonesia) Wage Dwi Aryo	PS Mojokerto Putra	Bhayangkara	
(Indonesia) Dedi Kusnandar	Bhayangkara	Persib Bandung	
(Indonesia) Asep Berlian	Persik Kediri	Bhayangkara	
(Indonesia) Dany Saputra	Persija Jakarta	Bhayangkara	
(Indonesia) Hery Prasetyo	Gresik United	Bhayangkara FC	
(Indonesia) Munhar	Arema Cronus	Bhayangkara	
(Indonesia) Hasyim Kipuw	Bhayangkara	Arema Cronus	
(Indonesia) Manahati Lestusen	Bhayangkara	Barito Putera	
(Brazil) Fabiano Beltrame	Persija Jakarta	Arema Cronus	
(Cameroon) Emmanuel Kenmogne	Bhayangkara	(Malaysia) Kelantan	
(Liberia) Isaac Pupo	Bhayangkara	(Malaysia) Kelantan	
(Indonesia) Rachmad Hidayat	Pro Duta	Pelita Bandung Raya	
(Indonesia) Ghozali Siregar	Pro Duta	Pelita Bandung Raya	
(Indonesia) Fandy Mochtar	Persiba Balikpapan	Pusamania Borneo	
(Indonesia) Victor Pae	Persija Jakarta	Pusamania Borneo	
(Indonesia) Egi Melgiansyah	Persija Jakarta	Pusamania Borneo	
(Indonesia) Febly Gushendra	Free agent	Persiba Balikpapan	
(Indonesia) Miftahul Hamdi	Persiraja Banda Aceh	Persiba Balikpapan	
(Indonesia) Mochammad Zaenuri	PON Jatim	Bhayangkara	
(Indonesia) Slamet Nurcahyo	Persepam Madura United	Bhayangkara	
(Mali) Djibril Coulibaly	Semen Padang	Free agent	
(Indonesia) Ambrizal	Bhayangkara	Persija Jakarta	
(Indonesia) Suroso	Persela Lamongan	Arema Cronus	
(Indonesia) Jumansyah	Free agent	Persiba Balikpapan	
(Indonesia) Muhammad Faisal Mahmud	Free agent	Persiba Balikpapan	
(Indonesia) Bryan Cesar	Free agent	Persiba Balikpapan	
(Indonesia) Ravi Murdianto	Free agent	Mitra Kukar	
(Indonesia) Gavin Kwan	Free agent	Mitra Kukar	
(Indonesia) Mahdi Fahri Albaar	Free agent	Mitra Kukar	
(Indonesia) Wawan Hendrawan	Persiba Balikpapan	Mitra Kukar	
(Indonesia) Ryuji Utomo	Free agent	Mitra Kukar	
(Indonesia) Geri Mandagi	Persiram Raja Ampat	Perseru Serui	
(Indonesia) Rachmat Afandi	Persija Jakarta	Mitra Kukar	
(Indonesia) Leonard Tupamahu	Persiram Raja Ampat	Barito Putera	
(Indonesia) Juanda Priyatna	Sriwijaya U21	Perseru Serui	
(Indonesia) Reky Rahayu	Persita Tangerang	Persija Jakarta	
(Indonesia) Syahrizal Syahbuddin	Persija Jakarta	Mitra Kukar	
(Indonesia) Abdul Lestaluhu	Bhayangkara	Persija Jakarta	
(Indonesia) Stefano Lilipaly	(Japan) Consadole Sapporo	Persija Jakarta	
(Indonesia) Mahadirga Lasut	Persita Tangerang	Persija Jakarta	
(Nigeria) Onorionde Kughegbe	Bhayangkara	(Malaysia) PDRM	
(Liberia) Sengbah Kennedy	Persiwa Wamena	Arema Cronus	
(Liberia) Yao Rudy Abblode	Persiwa Wamena	Arema Cronus	
(Montenegro) Srđan Lopičić	Persela Lamongan	Pusamania Borneo	
(Montenegro) Igor Radusinović	(Montenegro) Mladost Podgorica	Barito Putera	
(Indonesia) Bima Sakti	Mitra Kukar	Gresik United	
(Indonesia) Talaohu Musafri	Pelita Bandung Raya	Barito Putera	
(Indonesia) Agi Pratama	Peseban Banjarmasin	Barito Putera	
(Indonesia) Oktovianus Maniani	Perseru Serui	Pusamania Borneo	
(Indonesia) Hari Habrian	Persita Tangerang	Pusamania Borneo	
(Indonesia) Tommy Oropka	Perseman Manokwari	Pusamania Borneo	
(Indonesia) Hendra Susilo	Mitra Kukar U21	Pusamania Borneo	
(Indonesia) Galih Sudaryono	Persiram Raja Ampat	Pusamania Borneo	
(Indonesia) Yanto Basna	Sriwijaya U21	Mitra Kukar	
(Indonesia) Heri Setiawan	Free agent	Bhayangkara	
(Indonesia) Reza Mustofa	Gresik United	Bhayangkara	
(Indonesia) Muhammad Fauzan Jamal	Persijap Jepara	Bhayangkara	
(Indonesia) Agung Supriyanto	Persija Jakarta	Bhayangkara	
(Indonesia) Aji Saka	PSS Sleman	Gresik United	
(Indonesia) Muhammad Ridwan	Free agent	Gresik United	
(Indonesia) Dimas Drajad	Free agent	Gresik United	
(Indonesia) Roni Fatahillah	Pro Duta	Gresik United	
(Indonesia) Muhammad Rifki	Pro Duta	Gresik United	
(Indonesia) Agus Nova	Pro Duta	Gresik United	
(Indonesia) Donny Fernando Siregar	Pro Duta	Gresik United	
(Indonesia) Yusuf Effendi	Pro Duta	Gresik United	
(Indonesia) Muhammad Kamri	Barito Putera	Gresik United	
(Indonesia) Rendy Siregar	Barito Putera	Gresik United	
(Indonesia) Dian Irawan	Putra Samarinda	Gresik United	
(Indonesia) Supriyono Salimin	Putra Samarinda	Gresik United	
(Serbia) Saša Zečević	Southern Myanmar United	Gresik United	
(Indonesia) Jejen Zainal Abidin	Persiba Bantul	Gresik United	
(Indonesia) Wismoyo Widhistio	Persela Lamongan	Gresik United	
(Indonesia) Romy Agustiawan	PS Kwarta Deli Serdang	Gresik United	
(Indonesia) Riko Simanjuntak	PS Bangka	Gresik United	
(Indonesia) Fitra Ridwan	Persiraja Banda Aceh	Gresik United	
(Indonesia) Kerry Yudiono	Persijap Jepara	Persita Tangerang	
(Indonesia) Junaidi	Persikota Tangerang	Persita Tangerang	
(Indonesia) Oktavianus Fernando	Cilegon United	Persita Tangerang	
(Indonesia) Riski Novriansyah	Sriwijaya	Persita Tangerang	
(Indonesia) Mustopa Aji	Persikabo Bogor	Persita Tangerang	
(Indonesia) Tri Hamdani Goentara	Sriwijaya	Persita Tangerang	
(Indonesia) Akbar Riansyah	Persis Solo	Cilegon United	
(South Korea) Yoo Jae-hoon	Persipura Jayapura	Bali United	
(Indonesia) Syamsir Alam	Sriwijaya	Pelita Bandung Raya	
(Indonesia) Andrea Bitar	Free agent	Pelita Bandung Raya	
(South Korea) Park Chul-hyung	Mitra Kukar	(Malaysia) UiTM	
(Indonesia) Yandi Sofyan	Arema Cronus	Persib Bandung	
(Bulgaria) Martin Kovachev	(Bulgaria) PFC Haskovo	Pusamania Borneo	
(Indonesia) Ade Jantra Lukmana	Persita Tangerang	Pusamania Borneo	
(Indonesia) Selsius Gebze	Sriwijaya	Persipura Jayapura	
(Ivory Coast) Lanciné Koné	Sriwijaya	Persipura Jayapura	
(Indonesia) Ricardo Salampessy	Bhayangkara	Persipura Jayapura	
(Indonesia) Zulham Zamrun	Mitra Kukar	Persipura Jayapura	
(Indonesia) Raphael Maitimo	Mitra Kukar	Sriwijaya	
(France) Thierry Gathuessi	Arema Cronus	Persiram Raja Ampat	
(Liberia) James Koko Lomell	Barito Putera	Persiram Raja Ampat	
(Indonesia) Jimmy Suparno	Arema Cronus	Persiram Raja Ampat	
(Indonesia) Feri Aman Saragih	Pusamania Borneo	Arema Cronus	
(Indonesia) Erol Iba	Sriwijaya	Persepam Madura United	
(Indonesia) Zulvin Zamrun	Mitra Kukar	Pusamania Borneo	
(South Korea) Ha Dae-won	Barito Putera	Bali United	
(Indonesia) Endra Prasetya	Free agent	Bali United	
(Indonesia) Ricky Fajrin	Free agent	Bali United	
(Indonesia) Hendra Sandi Gunawan	Persiraja Banda Aceh	Bali United	
(Indonesia) Martinus Novianto	Free agent	Bali United	
(Indonesia) Yabes Roni	Free agent	Bali United	
(Indonesia) Ahmad Hisyam Tolle	Bhayangkara	Pusamania Borneo	
(Indonesia) Aditya Putra Dewa	Persepam Madura United	PSM Makassar	
(Indonesia) Yogi Novrian	Sriwijaya U21	Persela Lamongan	
(Uruguay) Bryan Aldave	(Brazil) Portuguesa	Persiba Balikpapan	
(Slovakia) Roman Golian	Persela Lamongan	Persiba Balikpapan	
(Indonesia) Aldaier Makatindu	Putra Samarinda	Pusamania Borneo	
(Argentina) Alan Aciar	(Argentina) Unión Villa Krause	Persija Jakarta	
(Indonesia) Gunawan Dwi Cahyo	Mitra Kukar	Persija Jakarta	
(Indonesia) Satrio Syam	Persita Tangerang	Pelita Bandung Raya	
(Brazil) Antônio Teles	Persepar Palangkaraya	Persiba Balikpapan	
(Nigeria) Osas Saha	Semen Padang	Perseru Serui	
(Liberia) Kubay Quaiyan	Persiram Raja Ampat	Perseru Serui	
(Spain) Jorge Gotor	(Iraq) Erbil SC	Mitra Kukar	
(Paraguay) Pedro Velázquez	Gresik United	Persela Lamongan	
(Cameroon) David Pagbe	Semen Padang	Persela Lamongan	
(Montenegro) Balša Božović	(Montenegro) FK Mornar	Persela Lamongan	
(Indonesia) Dinan Javier	Free agent	Mitra Kukar	
(Indonesia) Amadeus Suropati	Pusamania Borneo	Bali United	
(Indonesia) Basri Lohy	Pelita Bandung Raya	Pusamania Borneo	
(Indonesia) Saktiawan Sinaga	PSS Sleman	Pusamania Borneo	
(Indonesia) Adrianus Patrick Domal	Perseman Manokwari	PSGC Ciamis	
(Indonesia) Rizky Bagja	Free agent	PSGC Ciamis	
(Indonesia) Asep Mulyana	Free agent	PSGC Ciamis	
(Indonesia) Ipan Priyanto	Free agent	PSGC Ciamis	
(Indonesia) Dimas Galih Gumilang	Persik Kediri	PSGC Ciamis	
(Indonesia) Rudi Gunawan	Free agent	PSGC Ciamis	
(Indonesia) Indra Setiawan	Free agent	PSIS Semarang	
(Indonesia) Yesaya Desnam	Persiwa Wamena	Bhayangkara	
(Cameroon) Eric Djemba-Djemba	(India) Chennaiyin	Bhayangkara	
(Republic of Ireland) Roy O'Donovan	Brunei DPMM	Mitra Kukar	
(Liberia) Erick Weeks Lewis	Mitra Kukar	Pusamania Borneo	
(Spain) Cristian Portilla	(Hungary) Budapest Honvéd	Mitra Kukar	
(Cameroon) Herman Dzumafo	Free agent	Gresik United	
(North Macedonia) Goran Gancev	Free agent	Semen Padang	
(Brazil) Andrezinho	(Brazil) América Futebol Clube (RN)	Barito Putera	
(Indonesia) Terens Puhiri	Porprov Samarinda	Pusamania Borneo	
(Croatia) Goran Ljubojević	(Singapore) Balestier Khalsa	Sriwijaya	
(Indonesia) Rizky Pellu	Pelita Bandung Raya	Mitra Kukar	
(Indonesia) Fauzi Toldo	Sriwijaya	PSM Makassar	
(Indonesia) David Ariyanto	Free agent	PSM Makassar	
(Indonesia) Dimas Galih Pratama	Persijap Jepara	PSM Makassar	
(Serbia) Nemanja Vučićević	Free agent	PSM Makassar	
(Indonesia) Jaya Teguh Angga	Arema Cronus	Pusamania Borneo	
(Indonesia) Djayusman Triasdi	PSM Makassar	Pusamania Borneo	
(Indonesia) Rafid Lestaluhu	Pelita Bandung Raya	Persita Tangerang	
(Argentina) Gustavo Fabián López	Arema Cronus	(Malaysia) Terengganu FA	
(Nepal) Rohit Chand	Free agent	Persija Jakarta	
(Togo) Djaledjete Bedalbe	Free agent	Perseru Serui	
(Indonesia) Legimin Raharjo	Gresik United	Pelita Bandung Raya	
(Cyprus) Alekos Alekou	(Greece) AO Chania	Barito Putera	
(Cameroon) Émile Mbamba	Persiba Bantul	Bhayangkara	
(Chile) Cristian Febre	Free agent	Bali United	
(Argentina) Gaston Castaño	Free agent	Pelita Bandung Raya	
(Indonesia) Tommy Rifka	Free agent	PSM Makassar	

== Summer transfers ==
Name	Moving from	Moving to	Source
