= 2008 Liga Indonesia Premier Division final =

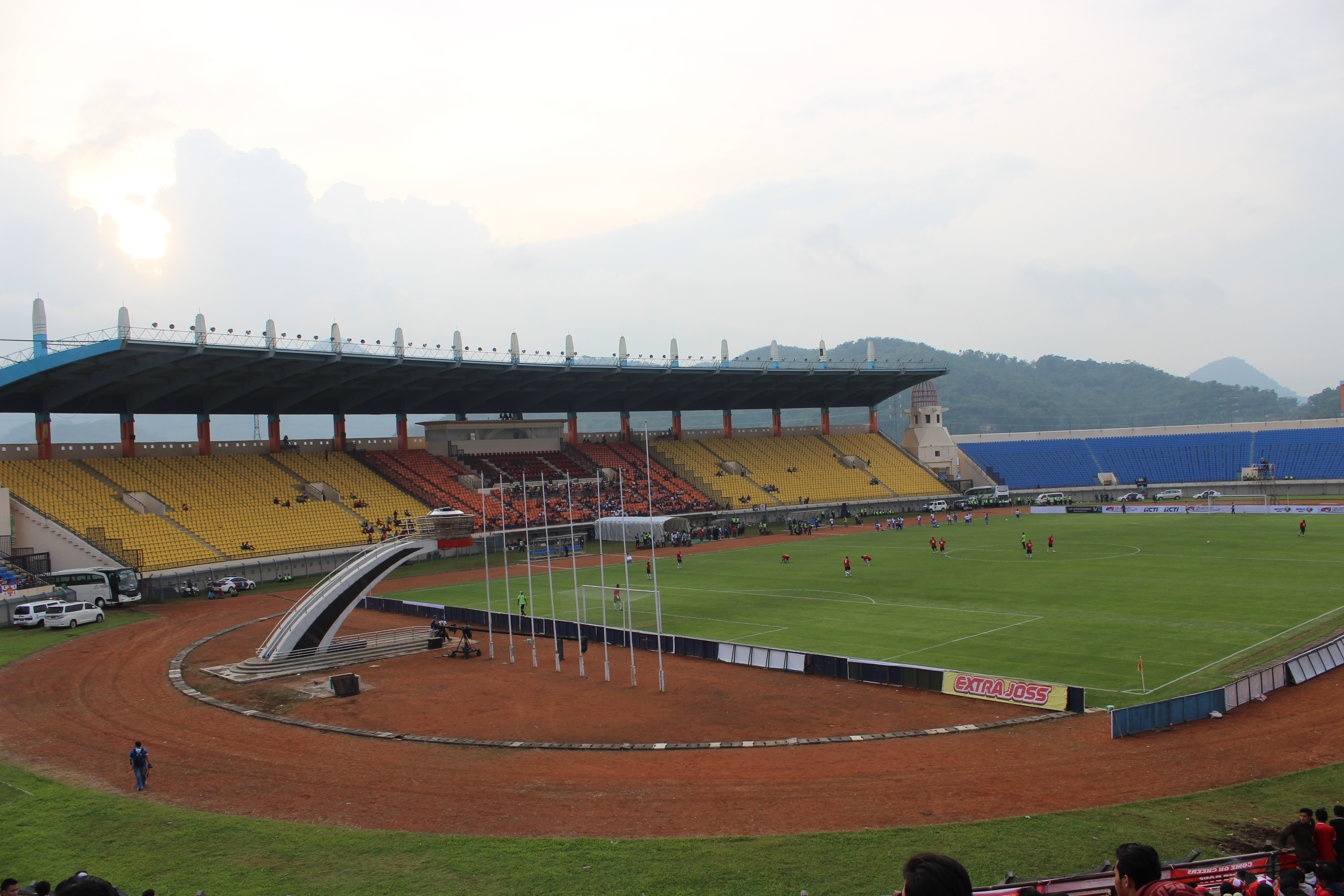
- Event: 2007–08 Liga Indonesia Premier Division
PSMS Medan	Sriwijaya FC
1	3
- After extra time
- Date: 10 February 2008
- Venue: Si Jalak Harupat Stadium, Bandung
- Man of the Match: Zah Rahan Krangar (Sriwijaya FC)
- Referee: Purwanto
- Attendance: 0
- Weather: Fine

The 2008 Liga Indonesia Premier Division final was a football match which was played on 10 February 2008 at Si Jalak Harupat Stadium in Bandung. The match was supposed to take place on 9 February 2008 in Jakarta. However, due to fan riots in one of the semifinal matches, the match was postponed by a day and moved to Bandung to be played behind closed doors. Neither PSMS and Sriwijaya had made the final stage before. Sriwijaya won the match, defeating PSMS 3–1 in extra time, after the match was drawn at 1–1 at the conclusion of regular time.

== Road to the final ==
PSMS Medan		Round	Sriwijaya FC	
Main article: 2007–08 Liga Indonesia Premier Division first stage: West Region: Team / Pld / W / D / L / GF / GA / GD / Pts; Sriwijaya FC / 34 / 20 / 6 / 8 / 59 / 31 / +28 / 66; Persija Jakarta / 34 / 18 / 7 / 9 / 55 / 40 / +15 / 61; PSMS Medan / 34 / 17 / 7 / 10 / 44 / 28 / +16 / 58; Persik Kediri / 34 / 17 / 5 / 12 / 61 / 51 / +10 / 56; Persib Bandung / 34 / 15 / 9 / 10 / 45 / 29 / +16 / 54; Persela Lamongan / 34 / 15 / 9 / 10 / 41 / 34 / +7 / 54; Persitara Jakarta Utara / 34 / 15 / 8 / 11 / 39 / 33 / +6 / 53; Pelita Jaya / 34 / 15 / 7 / 12 / 43 / 30 / +13 / 52; Persita Tangerang / 34 / 13 / 11 / 10 / 33 / 36 / −3 / 50; PSIS Semarang / 34 / 13 / 10 / 11 / 44 / 34 / +10 / 49; Persikabo Bogor / 34 / 12 / 12 / 10 / 46 / 38 / +8 / 48; PSS Sleman / 34 / 12 / 10 / 12 / 42 / 43 / −1 / 46; Persema Malang / 34 / 12 / 9 / 13 / 35 / 46 / −11 / 45; PSDS Deli Serdang / 34 / 12 / 8 / 14 / 39 / 40 / −1 / 44; Persikota Tangerang / 34 / 6 / 12 / 16 / 26 / 41 / −15 / 30; Semen Padang / 34 / 7 / 6 / 21 / 21 / 44 / −23 / 27; Persiraja Banda Aceh / 34 / 6 / 8 / 20 / 18 / 59 / −41 / 26; PSSB Bireuen / 34 / 6 / 6 / 22 / 26 / 60 / −34 / 24		First stage	Main article: 2007–08 Liga Indonesia Premier Division first stage: West Region: Team / Pld / W / D / L / GF / GA / GD / Pts; Sriwijaya FC / 34 / 20 / 6 / 8 / 59 / 31 / +28 / 66; Persija Jakarta / 34 / 18 / 7 / 9 / 55 / 40 / +15 / 61; PSMS Medan / 34 / 17 / 7 / 10 / 44 / 28 / +16 / 58; Persik Kediri / 34 / 17 / 5 / 12 / 61 / 51 / +10 / 56; Persib Bandung / 34 / 15 / 9 / 10 / 45 / 29 / +16 / 54; Persela Lamongan / 34 / 15 / 9 / 10 / 41 / 34 / +7 / 54; Persitara North Jakarta / 34 / 15 / 8 / 11 / 39 / 33 / +6 / 53; Pelita Jaya / 34 / 15 / 7 / 12 / 43 / 30 / +13 / 52; Persita Tangerang / 34 / 13 / 11 / 10 / 33 / 36 / −3 / 50; PSIS Semarang / 34 / 13 / 10 / 11 / 44 / 34 / +10 / 49; Persikabo Bogor / 34 / 12 / 12 / 10 / 46 / 38 / +8 / 48; PSS Sleman / 34 / 12 / 10 / 12 / 42 / 43 / −1 / 46; Persema Malang / 34 / 12 / 9 / 13 / 35 / 46 / −11 / 45; PSDS Deli Serdang / 34 / 12 / 8 / 14 / 39 / 40 / −1 / 44; Persikota Tangerang / 34 / 6 / 12 / 16 / 26 / 41 / −15 / 30; Semen Padang / 34 / 7 / 6 / 21 / 21 / 44 / −23 / 27; Persiraja Banda Aceh / 34 / 6 / 8 / 20 / 18 / 59 / −41 / 26; PSSB Bireuen / 34 / 6 / 6 / 22 / 26 / 60 / −34 / 24	
Main article: 2007–08 Liga Indonesia Premier Division second stage: Group A: Team / Pld / W / D / L / GF / GA / GD / Pts; Sriwijaya FC / 3 / 1 / 2 / 0 / 4 / 2 / +2 / 5; PSMS Medan / 3 / 1 / 1 / 1 / 4 / 4 / 0 / 4; Arema Malang / 3 / 1 / 1 / 1 / 3 / 4 / −1 / 4; Persiwa Wamena / 3 / 0 / 2 / 1 / 3 / 4 / −1 / 2		Second stage	Main article: 2007–08 Liga Indonesia Premier Division second stage: Group A: Team / Pld / W / D / L / GF / GA / GD / Pts; Sriwijaya FC / 3 / 1 / 2 / 0 / 4 / 2 / +2 / 5; PSMS Medan / 3 / 1 / 1 / 1 / 4 / 4 / 0 / 4; Arema Malang / 3 / 1 / 1 / 1 / 3 / 4 / −1 / 4; Persiwa Wamena / 3 / 0 / 2 / 1 / 3 / 4 / −1 / 2	
Opponent	Result	Knockout stage	Opponent	Result
Persipura Jayapura	0–0 (5–4 pen.)	Semifinals	Persija Jakarta	1–0

== Match details ==
10 February 2008
19:15 WIB

PSMS Medan	1–3 (a.e.t.)	Sriwijaya FC
Lomell 69'	Report	Wijay 15'; Gumbs 100'; Zah 115'

Si Jalak Harupat Stadium,, Bandung
Attendance: 0
Referee: Purwanto

PSMS Medan	Sriwijaya FC

PSMS Medan:
GK	20	(Indonesia) Markus Harison
DF	18	(Indonesia) Usep Munandar
DF	29	(Indonesia) Rommy Diaz		(substituted off) 32'
DF	50	(Liberia) Murphy Komunple	(yellow card) 32' (yellow-red card) 44'
DF	28	(Indonesia) Masperi Kasim (c)
MF	12	(Cameroon) Mbom Mbom Julien		(substituted off) 107'
MF	22	(Indonesia) Supardi
MF	24	(Indonesia) Legimin Raharjo
MF	77	(Argentina) Gustavo Chena
FW	10	(Liberia) James Koko
FW	26	(Indonesia) Saktiawan Sinaga
Substitutes:
DF	19	(Indonesia) Mahyadi Panggabean		(substituted on) 107'
DF	30	(Indonesia) Decky Ardian
MF	7	(Indonesia) Putut Waringin
MF	13	(Indonesia) Tommy Pranata
MF	21	(Indonesia) Boy Jati
FW	9	(Indonesia) Andika Yudhistira
FW	33	(Argentina) Andres Formento		(substituted on) 32'
Manager:
(Indonesia) Randiman Tarigan

Sriwijaya FC:
GK	12	(Indonesia) Ferry Rotinsulu	(yellow card) 75'
DF	22	(Indonesia) Slamet Riyadi	(yellow card) 20'
DF	4	(Indonesia) Charis Yulianto	(yellow card) 27'
DF	31	(Brazil) Carlos Renato (c)	(yellow card) 12'
DF	25	(Indonesia) Isnan Ali	(yellow card) 91'	(substituted off) 99'
MF	6	(Indonesia) Tony Sucipto
MF	29	(Indonesia) Wijay	(yellow card) 2'	(substituted off) 86'
MF	10	(Liberia) Zah Rahan Krangar
MF	16	(Indonesia) Benben Barlian		(substituted off) 73'
FW	9	(Nigeria) Anoure Obiora
FW	17	(Saint Kitts and Nevis) Keith Gumbs
Substitutes:
DF	18	(Indonesia) Firmansyah
DF	3	(Indonesia) Syafruddin		(substituted on) 99'
GK	23	(Indonesia) Dede Sulaiman
MF	11	(Indonesia) Korinus Fingkreuw		(substituted on) 73'
MF	28	(Indonesia) Alamsyah Nasution	(yellow card) 95'	(substituted on) 86'
FW	13	(Indonesia) Dian Fakhruddin
FW	20	(Indonesia) Oktavianus
Head Coach:
(Indonesia) Rahmad Darmawan

Man of the Match:
(Liberia) Zah Rahan Krangar (Sriwijaya FC)

== See also ==
- 2007–08 Liga Indonesia Premier Division
