= 2015 Pusamania Borneo season =

Pusamania Borneo
2015 season
- Head coach: Arcan Iurie
- Manager: Aidil Fitri
- Stadium: Segiri Samarinda Stadium
- Top goalscorer: League: Erick Weeks; Srđan Lopičić (1 goal); All: Erick Weeks; Srđan Lopičić (1 goal)

The 2015 Pusamania Borneo season was the 2nd season in the club's football history and their 1st season in the Indonesia Super League, the top-flight division in Indonesia.

== Review and events ==
=== Pre–2015 ===
They signed Hamka Hamzah as their first signing for the season on November 12, 2014. On December 7, 2014, Arcan Iurie was appointed as the new head coach replacing Iwan Setiawan and Fernando Gaston Soler was appointed as coach assistant. The team will have a one-week training camp in Samboja, starting December 23, 2014. Salvo will supply the kit for the squad for this season replacing Town.

The 2015 Indonesia Super League was officially discontinued by PSSI on May 2, 2015 due to a ban by Imam Nahrawi, Minister of Youth and Sports Affairs, against PSSI to run any football competition.

== Matches ==
=== Legend ===
Win Draw Loss Postponed

=== Friendlies ===
Competition	Date	KO	Stadium	City	Opponent	Result^{1}	Attendance	Goalscorers		Source
Competition	Date	KO	Stadium	City	Opponent	Result^{1}	Attendance	Pusamania Borneo	Opponent	Source
	18 December 2014				PS Pratama Yudha	5–1		Maniani 42'; Munandar 48'; Muchlis 53', 59'; Al-Habsyi	Puhiri 44'	
	20 December 2014		H	Samarinda	GMC FC	7–0		Gama 6', 32'; Hebrian 18'; Kovachev 22'; Achmad 24'; Hamzah 53'; Al-Habsyi 58'		
Walikota Padang Cup	4 January 2015	19:00	A	Padang	PSP Padang	1–0		Lopičić 33'		
Walikota Padang Cup	6 January 2015	16:15	A	Padang	Persib Bandung	0–3			Atep 38'; Tantan 54', 89'	
Walikota Padang Cup	8 January 2015	16:15	A	Padang	Semen Padang	0–2			Maulana 26'; Vizcarra 55'	
	12 January 2015		A	Jakarta	Batavia FC	4–1		Gama 10', 13'; Lopičić 20'; Zamrun 25'	Ramadan	
	14 January 2015	15:30	A	Jakarta	Villa 2000	3–0		Gama 51', 71'; Sinaga 90'		
	17 January 2015		A	Depok	PS Barito Putera	1–1		Sinaga 35'	Radusinovic 2'	
	24 January 2015		A	Depok	PS Angkatan Udara	2–1		Weeks 40'; Latief 56'	Haryana 73'	
	28 January 2015		H	Samarinda	PS Unmul	7–0		Tolle 6'; Achmad 27'; Lopičić 32' (pen.) 76'; Pae 43', 63'; Lohy		
	31 January 2015		H	Samarinda	Pusamania Borneo U-21	3–1		Goal	Goal	
	15 February 2015		H	Samarinda	PON Kaltim	2–0		Kovachev 8'; Angga 22'		
	1 March 2014		A	Balikpapan	Penajam Paser Utama	5–1		Puhiri 28'; Angga 39', 88'; Priatna; Febri 76'	Goal	
	4 March 2015		A	Makassar	PSM Makassar	0–1	12,000		Begovic 18'	
	8 March 2015	15:30	A	Kediri	Persik Kediri	0–1			Sugiyanto 80'	
	14 February 2015		H	Samarinda	PS Pengairan	14–0		Puhiri; Makatindu; Angga; Hamzah; Afriandi; Tolle; Priatna; Lopičić; Pae		
	27 March 2015		H	Samarinda	Pusamania Borneo U-21	8–1		Goal	Goal	
	29 March 2015		H	Samarinda	Bontang FC	5–0		Lewis 6', 40'; Sinaga 27'; Puhiri 33'; Hamzah 67'		
	30 April 2015		H	Samarinda	Gelora Pantai FC	11–0		Lewis; Hamzah; Sinaga; Hamka		
	27 May 2015	20:00	H	Samarinda	Bali United Pusam F.C.	1–0		Hamzah 9'		
	2 June 2015	20:00	A	Gianyar	Bali United Pusam F.C.	1–3		Angga 55'	Eliandry 15'; Gatra 37'; Sandy 56'	

=== Indonesia Super League ===
MD	Date	KO	Stadium	City	Opponent	Result^{1}	Attendance	Goalscorers		Source
MD	Date	KO	Stadium	City	Opponent	Result^{1}	Attendance	Pusamania Borneo	Opponent	Source
1	5 April 2015	15:30	A	Gresik	Persegres Gresik United	1–2	13,300	Weeks 86'	Effendi 34'; Simanjuntak 45'	
2	8 April 2015	19:00	A	Surabaya	Bhayangkara F.C.	1–1		Lopičić 68'	Mbamba 90+3'	

Notes

- 1.Pusamania Borneo's goals first.

== Squad ==
As of 8 April 2015.

No.	Pos	Nat	Player	Total		Indonesia Super League	
No.	Pos	Nat	Player	Apps	Goals	Apps	Goals
1	GK	(Indonesia) IDN	Galih Sudaryono	2	0	2	0
4	DF	(Indonesia) IDN	Achmad Hisyam Tolle	2	0	2	0
5	MF	(Indonesia) IDN	Fandy Mochtar	2	0	2	0
6	DF	(Indonesia) IDN	Djayusman Triasdi	1	0	1	0
7	FW	(Indonesia) IDN	Fandi Achmad	2	0	2	0
8	MF	(Indonesia) IDN	Egi Melgiansyah	0	0	0	0
10	MF	(Montenegro) MNE	Srđan Lopičić	2	1	2	1
14	DF	(Indonesia) IDN	Hamka Hamzah	0	0	0	0
15	DF	(Indonesia) IDN	Afriyandi	2	0	2	0
16	GK	(Indonesia) IDN	Mohammad Juni Irawan	0	0	0	0
17	FW	(Indonesia) IDN	Aldaier Makatindu	0	0	0	0
18	DF	(Indonesia) IDN	Usep Munandar	0	0	0	0
19	FW	(Indonesia) IDN	Ade Jantra Lukmana	1	0	1	0
20	FW	(Indonesia) IDN	Saktiawan Sinaga	1	0	1	0
21	MF	(Indonesia) IDN	Arie Priyatna	1	0	1	0
24	FW	(Indonesia) IDN	Jaya Teguh Angga	0	0	0	0
25	FW	(Indonesia) IDN	Febri Setiadi Hamzah	1	0	1	0
26	DF	(Bulgaria) BUL	Martin Kovachev	1	0	1	0
27	MF	(Indonesia) IDN	Oktovianus Maniani	2	0	2	0
28	MF	(Indonesia) IDN	Terens Puhiri	2	0	2	0
31	MF	(Indonesia) IDN	Hermansyah Muchlis	2	0	2	0
32	DF	(Indonesia) IDN	Victor Pae	0	0	0	0
34	FW	(Indonesia) IDN	Ali Ridho Al Habsyi	0	0	0	0
46	DF	(Indonesia) IDN	Tommy Oropka	0	0	0	0
50	MF	(Liberia) LBR	Erick Weeks Lewis	2	1	2	1
86	MF	(Indonesia) IDN	Basri Lohy	0	0	0	0
88	DF	(Indonesia) IDN	Rachmat Latief	0	0	0	0
93	GK	(Indonesia) IDN	Hendra Susilo	0	0	0	0
99	MF	(Indonesia) IDN	Zulvin Zamrun	2	0	2	0
	MF	(Indonesia) IDN	Hari Habrian	0	0	0	0

== Transfers ==
=== In ===
No.	Pos.	Name	Moving from	Type	Sources
1	GK	(Indonesia) Galih Sudaryono	Persiram Raja Ampat		
4	DF	(Indonesia) Achmad Hisyam Tolle	Bhayangkara F.C.		
5	MF	(Indonesia) Fandy Mochtar	Persiba Balikpapan		
6	DF	(Indonesia) Djayusman Triasdi	PSM Makassar		
8	MF	(Indonesia) Egi Melgiansyah	Persija Jakarta		
9	FW	(Brazil) Diego Gama	(Singapore) Hougang United		
10	MF	(Montenegro) Srđan Lopičić	Persela Lamongan		
14	DF	(Indonesia) Hamka Hamzah	(Malaysia) PKNS F.C.		
17	FW	(Indonesia) Aldaier Makatindu	Putra Samarinda		
19	FW	(Indonesia) Ade Jantra Lukmana	Persita Tangerang		
20	FW	(Indonesia) Saktiawan Sinaga	PSS Sleman		
24	FW	(Indonesia) Jaya Teguh Angga	Arema Cronus		
26	DF	(Bulgaria) Martin Kovachev	(Bulgaria) PFC Haskovo		
27	MF	(Indonesia) Oktovianus Maniani	Perseru Serui		
28	MF	(Indonesia) Terens Puhiri	Porprov Samarinda		
32	DF	(Indonesia) Victor Pae	Persija Jakarta		
46	DF	(Indonesia) Tommy Oropka	Perseman Manokwari		
50	MF	(Liberia) Erick Weeks Lewis	Mitra Kukar		
86	MF	(Indonesia) Basri Lohy	Pelita Bandung Raya		
93	GK	(Indonesia) Hendra Susilo	Mitra Kukar U-21		
99	MF	(Indonesia) Zulvin Zamrun	Mitra Kukar		
	MF	(Indonesia) Hari Habrian	Persita Tangerang		

=== Out ===
No.	Pos.	Name	Moving to	Type	Sources
	MF	(Brazil) Danilo Fernando	Retirement	Released	
	FW	(Argentina) Fernando Gaston Soler	Retirement	Released	
	MF	(Indonesia) Feri Aman Saragih	Arema Cronus	Free	
	FW	(Brazil) Diego Gama	Resigned	Released	
	MF	(Indonesia) Fandy Mochtar		Sacked	
	FW	(Indonesia) Saktiawan Sinaga		Sacked	
	MF	(Indonesia) Oktovianus Maniani		Sacked	
