= 2010 Piala Indonesia =

Tournament details
- Country: Indonesia
- Dates: 14 April – 1 August 2010
- Teams: 32

Final positions
- Champions: Sriwijaya (3rd title)
- Runners-up: Arema Indonesia

Tournament statistics
- Matches played: 78
- Goals scored: 222 (2.85 per match)
- Top goal scorer: Cristian Gonzáles (10)

The 2010 Piala Indonesia was the fifth edition of Piala Indonesia, the nationwide football cup tournament in Indonesia, involving professional clubs from Indonesia Super League, Premier Division and First Division. Sriwijaya was the tournament's defending champions. The winner of the tournament qualified to play for 2011 AFC Champions League qualification. RCTI was appointed as the official TV broadcaster for this tournament.

Sriwijaya became champions for the third year in a row after a 2–1 victory over Arema Indonesia in the final match at Manahan Stadium, Solo.

== Regulation ==
Each club was allowed to play no more than three foreign players in each match.

== First group stage ==
Key to colours in group tables
Group winners and runners-up advance to the second group stage

=== Group A ===
All group matches played in Palembang.

Team	Pld	W	D	L	GF	GA	GD	Pts
Sriwijaya	3	2	1	0	7	2	+5	7
Persikabo Bogor	3	2	0	1	6	4	+2	6
PSPS Pekanbaru	3	0	2	1	1	3	−2	2
Semen Padang	3	0	1	2	1	6	−5	1

14 April 2010
16:00

Sriwijaya	1 – 1	PSPS
Octavianus 48'	(Report)	Dzumafo 90'

Jakabaring Stadium, Palembang
Attendance: 4,500
Referee: Midi Setiyono

14 April 2010
19:00

Semen Padang	1 – 3	Persikabo
Febri 32'	(Report)	Santoni 33', 58', 90'

Jakabaring Stadium, Palembang
Attendance: 435
Referee: Maslah Iksan

16 April 2010
16:00

Sriwijaya	3 – 0	Semen Padang
Kayamba 8' (pen.); Nasuha 34', 40'	(Report)

Jakabaring Stadium, Palembang
Attendance: 8,127
Referee: Ferdinan Duha

16 April 2010
19:00

Persikabo	2 – 0	PSPS
Santoni 33'; Hadi 81'	(Report)

Jakabaring Stadium, Palembang
Attendance: 482
Referee: Sulistyoko

18 April 2010
15:30

Persikabo	1 – 3	Sriwijaya
Septian 14'	(Report)	Arif S. 39', 88'; Solomin 78'

Jakabaring Stadium, Palembang
Attendance: 7,200
Referee: Midi Setiyono

18 April 2010
15:30

PSPS	0 – 0	Semen Padang
	(Report)

Bumi Sriwijaya Stadium, Palembang
Attendance: 873
Referee: Rorim Situmeang

=== Group B ===
All group matches played in Lamongan and Gresik.

Team	Pld	W	D	L	GF	GA	GD	Pts
Persija Jakarta	3	2	1	0	6	2	+4	7
Persela Lamongan	3	2	1	0	4	2	+2	7
Persiba Bantul	3	0	1	2	2	4	−2	1
Persikab Bandung	3	0	1	2	2	6	−4	1

16 April 2010
15:30

Persela	0 – 0	Persija
	(Report)

Surajaya Stadium, Lamongan
Attendance: 11,312
Referee: Mardi

16 April 2010
19:00

Persikab	0 – 0	Persiba
	(Report)

Surajaya Stadium, Lamongan
Attendance: 1,000
Referee: Suwandi

18 April 2010
15:30

Persiba	1 – 2	Persija
Ugik 25'	(Report)	Talaohu 19'; Mustafic 27'

Surajaya Stadium, Lamongan
Attendance: 2,250
Referee: Najamudin Aspiran

18 April 2010
19:00

Persela	2 – 1	Persikab
Zada 17'; Kurniawan 90'	(Report)	Udo 14'

Surajaya Stadium, Lamongan
Attendance: 5,000
Referee: Nurdin

20 April 2010
15:30

Persiba	1 – 2	Persela
Roni 13'	(Report)	T. Kasrun 32'; Tomo 49'

Surajaya Stadium, Lamongan
Attendance: 5,230
Referee: Mardi

20 April 2010
15:30

Persija	4 – 1	Persikab
Aliyudin 10', 45'; Ismed 45'; Ilham 70'	(Report)	M. Agung 78'

Petrokimia Stadium, Gresik
Attendance: 3,205
Referee: Fahri Albar

=== Group C ===
All group matches played in Karawang.

Team	Pld	W	D	L	GF	GA	GD	Pts
Persib Bandung	3	3	0	0	10	2	+8	9
Pelita Jaya	3	2	0	1	4	2	+2	6
Persita Tangerang	3	0	1	2	3	7	−4	1
Persipasi Bekasi	3	0	1	2	2	8	−6	1

17 April 2010
15:30

Persib	4 – 1	Persita
Gonzalez 10', 30', 63'; Irwan 77'	(Report)	Abdulrahman 47'

Singaperbangsa Stadium, Karawang
Attendance: 10,000
Referee: Anselmus

17 April 2010
19:00

Pelita Jaya	2 – 0	Persipasi
Ardan 79'; Marwan 88'	(Report)

Singaperbangsa Stadium, Karawang
Attendance: 6,043
Referee: Iwan Sukoco

19 April 2010
15:30

Pelita Jaya	1 – 2	Persib
Marwan 50'	(Report)	Gonzalez 25'; Airlangga 37'

Singaperbangsa Stadium, Karawang
Attendance: 9,063
Referee: Armando Pribadi

19 April 2010
19:00

Persita	2 – 2	Persipasi
Agus Salim 34', 65'	(Report)	Mennoh 61' (pen.); Firmansyah 89'

Singaperbangsa, Karawang
Attendance: 2,000
Referee: Eri Bastari

21 April 2010
15:30

Persipasi	0 – 4	Persib
	(Report)	Gonzalez 7', 31', 42' (pen.); Budi 48'

Singaperbangsa Stadium, Karawang
Attendance: 7,500
Referee: Armando Pribadi

21 April 2010
19:00

Persita	0 – 1	Pelita Jaya
	(Report)	Marwan 54'

Singaperbangsa, Karawang
Attendance: 5,250
Referee: Hasanudin

=== Group D ===
All group matches played in Kediri and Blitar.

Team	Pld	W	D	L	GF	GA	GD	Pts
Persik Kediri	3	3	0	0	8	0	+8	9
Persibo Bojonegoro	3	2	0	1	3	2	+1	6
PSBI Blitar	3	1	0	2	3	6	−3	3
Persitara North Jakarta	3	0	0	3	3	9	−6	0

17 April 2010
15:30

Persik	3 – 0	PSBI
Saktiawan 25', 77'; Khusnul Yuli 65'	(Report)

Brawijaya Stadium, Kediri
Attendance: 10,000
Referee: Jerry Elly

17 April 2010
15:30

Persitara	1 – 2	Persibo
Abdulrahman 89'	(Report)	Cielo 47'; Melky 67'

Gelora Supriyadi Stadium, Blitar
Attendance: 1,000
Referee: Olehadi

19 April 2010
15:30

Persik	1 – 0	Persibo
Han Ji-Ho 45'	(Report)

Brawijaya Stadium, Kediri
Attendance: 7,815
Referee: Muhammad Safei

19 April 2010
15:30

PSBI	3 – 2	Persitara
Nanda 4', 29'; Nnengue 52'	(Report)	Tantan 16'; Kabir Bello 88'

Gelora Supriyadi Stadium, Blitar
Attendance: 9,937
Referee: Saripudin

21 April 2010
15:15

Persitara	0 – 4	Persik
	(Report)	Saktiawan 14', 53', 60'; Yongki 20'

Brawijaya Stadium, Kediri
Attendance: 6,565
Referee: Hadi Suroso

21 April 2010
15:30

Persibo	1 – 0	PSBI
Busari 44'	(Report)

Gelora Supriyadi Stadium, Blitar
Attendance: 9,971
Referee: Jerry Elly

=== Group E ===
All group matches played in Malang.

Team	Pld	W	D	L	GF	GA	GD	Pts
Arema Malang	3	3	0	0	6	1	+5	9
PSMP Mojokerto	3	2	0	1	5	4	+1	6
Persijap Jepara	3	1	0	2	2	5	−3	3
Deltras Sidoarjo	3	0	0	3	3	6	−3	0

15 April 2010
15:30

Arema	3 – 0	Persijap
Roman 36'; Dendi 43'; Rony 90'	(Report)

Kanjuruhan Stadium, Malang
Attendance: 28,878
Referee: Jimmy Napitupulu

15 April 2010
19:00

Deltras	2 – 3	PSMP
Indra 69' (pen.); Fery 87'	(Report)	Kuncoro 45' (pen.); Evandro 72'; Nuku 82'

Kanjuruhan Stadium, Malang
Attendance: 764
Referee: Oki Dwi Putra

17 April 2010
15:30

PSMP	1 – 0	Persijap
Evandro 36'	(Report)

Kanjuruhan Stadium, Malang
Attendance: 15,000
Referee: Tisna Triyana

17 April 2010
19:00

Arema	1 – 0	Deltras
Alam Shah 53' (pen.)	(Report)

Kanjuruhan Stadium, Malang
Attendance: 32,552
Referee: Muhammad Agus

20 April 2010
15:30

PSMP	1 – 2	Arema
Fadli 37'	(Report)	Sunarto 44'; Tommy P. 65'

Kanjuruhan Stadium, Malang
Attendance: 23,250
Referee: Oki Dwi Putra

20 April 2010
15:30

Persijap	2 – 1	Deltras
Johan 15'; Iswanto 70'	(Report)	Satyo 21'

Gajayana Stadium, Malang
Attendance: 100
Referee: Deri Koswara

=== Group F ===
All group matches played in Surabaya.

Team	Pld	W	D	L	GF	GA	GD	Pts
Persebaya Surabaya	3	2	1	0	5	3	+2	7
Persidafon Dafonsoro	3	2	0	1	6	3	+3	6
Persema Malang	3	1	0	2	1	3	−2	3
Persipro Probolinggo	3	0	1	2	1	4	−3	1

18 April 2010
15:30

Persebaya	1 – 1	Persipro
Andik 76'	(Report)	Setyo Budi 50'

Gelora 10 November Stadium, Surabaya
Attendance: 9,000
Referee: Aeng Suarlan

18 April 2010
19:00

Persema	0 – 2	Persidafon
	(Report)	Javier Roca 21'; P. Wanggai 80'

Gelora 10 November Stadium, Surabaya
Attendance: 2,000
Referee: Ahmad Suparman

20 April 2010
15:30

Persebaya	3 – 2	Persidafon
Jeon Byung-Euk 25'; Cirelli 62'; Patricio 84'	(Report)	Uston 30'; C. Raul 35'

Gelora 10 November Stadium, Surabaya
Attendance: 5,000
Referee: Ahmad Suparman

20 April 2010
19:00

Persipro	0 – 1	Persema
	(Report)	Bima Sakti 41'

Gelora 10 November Stadium, Surabaya
Attendance: 1,500
Referee: Jajat Sudrajat

23 April 2010
15:30

Persema	0 – 1	Persebaya
	(Report)	Andik 43'

Gelora 10 November Stadium, Surabaya
Attendance: 14,000
Referee: Tardianis

23 April 2010
19:00

Persidafon	2 – 0	Persipro
C. Raul 28'; Javier Roca 59'	(Report)

Gelora 10 November Stadium, Surabaya
Attendance: 254
Referee: Hamsir

=== Group G ===
All group matches played in Samarinda.

Team	Pld	W	D	L	GF	GA	GD	Pts
Persisam Samarinda	3	3	0	0	14	2	+12	9
Bontang	3	1	1	1	7	4	+3	4
Persiba Balikpapan	3	1	1	1	5	5	0	4
Persemalra Southeast Maluku	3	0	0	3	2	17	−15	0

16 April 2010
16:30

Persisam	1 – 0	Bontang
Irsyad 57'	(Report)

Segiri Stadium, Samarinda
Attendance: 7,321
Referee: Iis Isya Permana

16 April 2010
19:00

Persiba	2 – 0	Persemalra
Hatta 6'; Anggo 78'	(Report)

Segiri Stadium, Samarinda
Attendance: 4,865
Referee: Yandri

18 April 2010
16:30

Persisam	3 – 1	Persiba
Zaenal Arif 13', 61'; Danilo 87'	(Report)	Robertino 69'

Segiri Stadium, Samarinda
Attendance: 8,452
Referee: Suharto

18 April 2010
19:00

Persemalra	1 – 5	Bontang
Pattikawa 24'	(Report)	Geddy 50'; Joko Sidik 66'; Aldo Barreto 75', 90'; Fadhil 79'

Segiri Samarinda, Samarinda
Attendance: 3,356
Referee: Mulyadi

20 April 2010
16:00

Bontang	2 – 2	Persiba
Aldo Barreto 28'; Kenji 68'	(Report)	Julio Lopez 42'; Robertino 78' (pen.)

Palaran Stadium, Samarinda
Attendance: 5,852
Referee: Yandri

20 April 2010
18:30

Persemalra	1 – 10	Persisam
Pattikawa 53'	(Report)	Zaenal Arif 2', 15', 36', 50'; Thonkanya 10', 13', 59', 85'; A. Sambiring 29'; Agung S. 70'

Segiri Stadium, Samarinda
Attendance: 6,898
Referee: Restu Slamet Wijaya

=== Group H ===
All group matches played in Jayapura City and Jayapura Regency.

Team	Pld	W	D	L	GF	GA	GD	Pts
Persipura Jayapura	3	3	0	0	10	3	+7	9
PSM Makassar	3	2	0	1	3	5	−2	6
Persiwa Wamena	3	1	0	2	4	6	−2	3
Persiram Raja Ampat	3	0	0	3	5	8	−3	0

17 April 2010
15:30

PSM	2 – 1	Persiram
Asri Akbar 11'; Ayyoubi 60' (pen.)	(Report)	Titus Bonai 67'

Mandala Stadium, Jayapura
Attendance: 1,539
Referee: Sapari

17 April 2010
19:00

Persipura	3 – 1	Persiwa
V. Igbonefo 34'; Tinus Pae 60'; S. Bonsapia 63'	(Report)	A. Yarangga 71'

Mandala Stadium, Jayapura
Attendance: 18,563
Referee: Djumadi Effendi

19 April 2010
15:30

Persiram	2 – 3	Persiwa
Rachmat Latief 42'; Refelino Imbiri 86'	(Report)	A. Aronggear 38', 84'; F. Mofu 58'

Mandala Stadium, Jayapura
Attendance: 13,623
Referee: Solikin

19 April 2010
19:00

Persipura	4 – 0	PSM
Boaz 1'; E. Ivakdalam 24' (pen.); Tinus Pae 84'; G. Pangkali 89'	(Report)

Mandala Stadium, Jayapura
Attendance: 19,163
Referee: Suwandi

21 April 2010
15:30

Persiram	2 – 3	Persipura
Titus Bonai 40'; Engel Berth 50'	(Report)	Qu Cheng 22'; V. Igbonefo 39', 86' (pen.)

Mandala Stadium, Jayapura
Attendance: 1,291
Referee: Djumadi Effendi

21 April 2010
19:00

Persiwa	0 – 1	PSM
	(Report)	Osvaldo 46'

Barnabas Youwe Stadium, Jayapura
Attendance: 1,183
Referee: Joni Parera

== Second group stage ==
In the second group stage, the teams that advanced from the first group stage were divided into 4 groups. Each group played in specific cities (Group 9 in Palembang, Group 10 in Surabaya, Group 11 in Malang, and Group 12 in Jayapura).

Key to colours in group tables
Group winners and runners-up advance to the knockout phase

=== Group 9 ===
Five group matches were played in Palembang and one in Surakarta.

Team	Pld	W	D	L	GF	GA	GD	Pts
Persija Jakarta	3	2	1	0	5	0	+5	7
Sriwijaya	3	1	2	0	12	2	+10	5
Persisam Samarinda	3	1	1	1	9	5	+4	4
PSMP Mojokerto	3	0	0	3	2	21	−19	0

8 May 2010
15:30

Sriwijaya	0 – 0	Persija
	(Report)

Jakabaring Stadium, Palembang
Attendance: 5,215
Referee: Oki Dwi Putra

8 May 2010
19:00

PSMP	2 – 7	Persisam
Orock 67'; Evandro 73'	(Report)	Thonkanya 9', 51', 58'; Zaenal Arif 12', 80'; Danilo 83'; A. Sambiring 90'

Jakabaring Stadium, Palembang
Attendance: 500
Referee: Jajat Sudrajat

10 May 2010
15:30

Sriwijaya	2 – 2	Persisam
Rivai 25'; Arif S. 88'	(Report)	Thonkanya 11', 75'

Jakabaring Stadium, Palembang
Attendance: 5,000

10 May 2010
19:00

Persija	4 – 0	PSMP
Bambang 11', 28'; Mustafic 43'; Ismed 83'	(Report)

Jakabaring Stadium, Palembang
Attendance: 2,331

3 June 2010
15:30

Persisam	0 – 1	Persija
	(Report)	Aliyudin 14'

Manahan Stadium, Surakarta
Attendance: 10,000
Referee: Djumadi Effendi

3 June 2010
15:30

PSMP	0 – 10	Sriwijaya
	(Report)	Obiora 7', 15', 22', 27'; Zah Rahan 19'; Arif S. 21'; Tony S. 33'; A. Mukminin 42'; Gumbs 45'; Rivai 90'

Jakabaring Stadium, Palembang
Attendance: 7,235
Referee: Jajat Sudrajat

=== Group 10 ===
All group matches played in Surabaya.

Team	Pld	W	D	L	GF	GA	GD	Pts
Persebaya Surabaya	3	2	1	0	3	1	+2	7
Persib Bandung	3	1	2	0	5	2	+3	5
Persibo Bojonegoro	3	1	1	1	4	4	0	4
Bontang	3	0	0	3	2	7	−5	0

9 May 2010
15:30

Persebaya	2 – 1	Persibo
Supriyono 58', 62'	(Report)	Perry 85'

Gelora 10 November Stadium, Surabaya
Attendance: 17,500
Referee: Iis Isya Permana

9 May 2010
19:00

Persib	4 – 1	Bontang
Gonzalez 21', 44', 63'; Atep 58'	(Report)	Satria Feri 42'

Gelora 10 November Stadium, Surabaya
Attendance: 6,000
Referee: Armando Pribadi

11 May 2010
15:30

Bontang	0 – 1	Persebaya
	(Report)	Patricio 90+3' (pen.)

Gelora 10 November Stadium, Surabaya
Attendance: 6,500
Referee: Mardi

11 May 2010
19:00

Persibo	1 – 1	Persib
Perry 54'	(Report)	Nova 14'

Gelora 10 November Stadium, Surabaya
Attendance: 3,000

13 May 2010
15:30

Persebaya	0 – 0	Persib
	(Report)

Gelora 10 November Stadium, Surabaya
Attendance: 28,000

13 May 2010
19:00

Persibo	2 – 1	Bontang
Nurhidayat 27'; Perry 40' (pen.)	(Report)	Kenji 80'

Gelora 10 November Stadium, Surabaya
Attendance: 2,000

=== Group 11 ===
All group matches played in Malang.

Team	Pld	W	D	L	GF	GA	GD	Pts
Arema Malang	3	3	0	0	4	0	+4	9
Pelita Jaya	3	1	1	1	2	3	−1	4
Persidafon Dafonsoro	3	1	0	2	3	4	−1	3
Persela Lamongan	3	0	1	2	3	5	−2	1

7 May 2010
15:30

Arema	2 – 0	Pelita Jaya
R. Affandi 72'; Dendi 90'	(Report)

Kanjuruhan Stadium, Malang
Attendance: 15,322
Referee: Olehadi

7 May 2010
19:00

Persela	2 – 3	Persidafon
Jimmy S. 65'; Zada 79'	(Report)	Elie 12'; C. Raul 49', 87' (pen.)

Kanjuruhan Stadium, Malang
Attendance: 4,750
Referee: Muhammad Safei

9 May 2010
15:30

Persidafon	0 – 1	Arema
	(Report)	Dendi 72'

Kanjuruhan Stadium, Malang
Attendance: 32,398
Referee: Sapari

9 May 2010
19:00

Pelita Jaya	1 – 1	Persela
M. Ridwan 3'	(Report)	Z. Arifin 7'

Kanjuruhan Stadium, Malang
Attendance: 4,452
Referee: Suharto

12 May 2010
15:30

Arema	1 – 0	Persela
M. Fakhrudin 75'	(Report)

Kanjuruhan Stadium, Malang
Attendance: 10,762
Referee: Jerry Elly

12 May 2010
15:30

Persidafon	0 – 1	Pelita Jaya
	(Report)	Jajang 85'

Gajayana Stadium, Malang
Attendance: 450

=== Group 12 ===
All group matches played in Jayapura.

Team	Pld	W	D	L	GF	GA	GD	Pts
Persipura Jayapura	3	3	0	0	11	3	+8	9
Persik Kediri	3	2	0	1	5	6	−1	6
PSM Makassar	3	0	1	2	4	7	−3	1
Persikabo Bogor	3	0	1	2	4	8	−4	1

9 May 2010
15:30

Persipura	3 – 1	PSM
Boaz 37', 40', 87'	(Report)	Osvaldo 30'

Mandala Stadium, Jayapura
Attendance: 10,000
Referee: Midi Setiyono

9 May 2010
19:00

Persik	2 – 1	Persikabo
Saktiawan 55'; Han Ji-ho 85'	(Report)	Jibby 59'

Mandala Stadium, Jayapura
Attendance: 15,431
Referee: Yandri

11 May 2010
15:30

PSM	1 – 2	Persik
Park Jung-hwan 85'	(Report)	Legimin 73' (pen.); Saktiawan 90'

Mandala Stadium, Jayapura
Attendance: 12,231

11 May 2010
19:00

Persikabo	1 – 4	Persipura
Jibby 8'	(Report)	G. Pangkali 15'; V. Igbonefo 32' (pen.); I. Wanggai 53'; Ian Kabes 79'

Mandala Stadium, Jayapura
Attendance: 15,217

13 May 2010
15:30

Persipura	4 – 1	Persik
P. Rumere 14'; Ortizan 22'; Qu Cheng 50'; Ian Kabes 83'	(Report)	Zhang Zhuo 52'

Mandala Stadium, Jayapura
Attendance: 14,215

13 May 2010
19:00

Persikabo	2 – 2	PSM
Mu'min 49'; Ade Iwan 89'	(Report)	Osvaldo 24'; Diva Tarkas 35'

Mandala Stadium, Jayapura
Attendance: 10,218

== Knockout stage ==
Each tie in the quarter-finals was played over two legs, with each team playing one leg at home. The team that has the higher aggregate score over the two legs progresses to the next round. Goal difference is the first tiebreaker used to rank teams which finish with an equal number of points. If aggregate scores finish level and goal difference are equal, then the team that scored more goals away from home over the two legs progresses. If away goals are also equal, 30 minutes of extra time are played. If there are goals scored during extra time and the aggregate score is still level, the visiting team qualifies by virtue of more away goals scored. If no goals are scored during extra time, there is a penalty shootout after extra time.

In the draw for the quarter-finals, teams are randomized. There were no seedings, and teams from the same group may be drawn with each other. The four group winners were drawn against the four group runners-up.

All times WIB

=== Qualified teams ===
Group	Winners	Runners-up
9	Persija Jakarta	Sriwijaya
10	Persebaya Surabaya	Persib Bandung
11	Arema Malang	Pelita Jaya
12	Persipura Jayapura	Persik Kediri

=== Bracket ===
Quarter-finals
15/19 July
Pelita Jaya	1	0	1
Persipura Jayapura	6	1	7
16/20 July
Sriwijaya	2	0	2
Persebaya Surabaya	0	1	1
17/21 July
Persija Jakarta	4	0	4
Persik Kediri	3	2	5
18/22 July
Arema Indonesia	3	0	3
Persib Bandung	0	2	2

Semi-finals
27 July – Sidoarjo
Persipura Jayapura	2 (1)
Sriwijaya (p)	2 (3)
28 July – Sidoarjo
Persik Kediri	0
Arema Indonesia	4

Final
1 August – Solo
Sriwijaya	2
Arema Indonesia	1
Third place
31 July – Solo
Persipura Jayapura	0
Persik Kediri	1

=== Quarter-finals ===
==== Pelita Jaya – Persipura ====
First game

July 15, 2010
15.30 WIB

Pelita Jaya Jawa Barat	1 – 6 (HT : 0 – 4)	Persipura Jayapura
Egi Melgiansyah (yellow card) 54'; Redouane Barkaoui (yellow card) 80'; Jajang Mulyana 84'; Marwan M. Sayedeh (yellow card) 85'	(Laporan)	Gerald Pangkali 8', 49' (yellow card) 8'; Boaz Solossa 16', 20', 28', 75'; Qu Cheng (yellow card) 73'

Singaperbangsa Stadium, Karawang
Attendance: 2,050
Referee: Djumadi Effendi

Second game

July 19, 2010
15.30 WIT

Persipura Jayapura	1 – 0 (HT : 1 – 0)	Pelita Jaya Jawa Barat
Ian Louis Kabes 22'	(Laporan)

Mandala Stadium, Jayapura
Attendance: 5,000
Referee: Joni Parera

Persipura Jayapura won 7–1 on aggregate.

==== Sriwijaya FC – Persebaya ====
First game

July 16, 2010
15.30 WIB

Sriwijaya FC	2 – 0 (HT : 1 – 0)	Persebaya Surabaya
Keith Kayamba Gumbs 16'; Pavel Solomin 75'	(Laporan)	Wijay (yellow card) 19'; Mat Halil (yellow card) 68'; Djayusman Triasdi (yellow card) 75'

Gelora Sriwijaya Stadium, Palembang
Attendance: 2,000
Referee: Iis Isya Permana

Second game

July 20, 2010
15.30 WIB

Persebaya Surabaya	1 – 0 (HT : 0 – 0)	Sriwijaya FC
Takatoshi Uchida (yellow card) 30'; Juan Marcelo Cirelli 88' (pen.)	(Laporan)	Precious Emuejeraye (yellow card) 87'

Gelora 10 November Stadium, Surabaya
Attendance: 10,000
Referee: Oki Dwi Putra Senjaya

Sriwijaya FC won 2–1 on aggregate.

==== Persija – Persik ====
First game

July 17, 2010
15.30 WIB

Persija Jakarta	4 – 3	Persik Kediri
Bambang Pamungkas 45', 47', 90'; Papa Abdou Toure 61'; Abanda Herman (yellow card) 77'	(Laporan)	Yongki Aribowo 41', 54'; Kusnul Yuli Kurniawan (yellow card) 78'; Wawan Widiantoro 90'

Manahan Stadium, Solo
Attendance: 9,080
Referee: Aeng Suarlan

Second game

July 21, 2010
15.30 WIB

Persik Kediri	2 – 0 (HT : 2 – 0)	Persija Jakarta
Mahyadi Panggabean 19'; Yongki Aribowo 35'; Saktiawan Sinaga (yellow card) 83'	(Laporan)	Leonard Tupamahu (yellow card) 32'; Papa Abdou Toure (yellow card) 78'; Fahrudin Mustafic (yellow card) 89'

Brawijaya Stadium, Kediri
Attendance: 10,000
Referee: Najamuddin Aspiran

Persik Kediri won 5–4 on aggregate.

==== Arema – Persib ====
First game

July 18, 2010
15.30 WIB

Arema Indonesia	3 – 0 (HT : 0 – 0)	Persib Bandung
Juan Revi Auriqto (yellow card) 30'; Irfan Raditya (yellow card) 53'; Rahmat Affandi 58'; Pierre Njanka Beyaka 69' (pen.); Dendi Santoso 70'	(Laporan)	Nova Arianto (yellow card) 6'; Hariono (yellow card) 34'

Kanjuruhan Stadium, Malang
Attendance: 21,955
Referee: Jimmy Napitupulu

Second game

July 22, 2010
15.30 WIB

Persib Bandung	2 – 0 (HT : 1 – 0)	Arema Indonesia
Christian Rene Martinez 26', 76'; Nova Arianto (yellow card) 30'; Munadi (yellow card) 42'	(Laporan)	Dendi Santoso (yellow card) 25' (yellow-red card) 28'; Mohd. Noh Alam Shah (yellow card) 56'

Si Jalak Harupat Stadium, Bandung
Attendance: 0
Referee: Olehadi

Arema Indonesia won 3–2 on aggregate.

=== Semi-finals ===
==== Persipura – Sriwijaya FC ====
July 27, 2010
20.00 WIB

Persipura Jayapura	2 – 2 (a.e.t.) (HT : 1 – 1)	Sriwijaya FC
Gerald Pangkali 3'; Victor Igbonefo 56'; Stevie G.M. Bonsapia (yellow card) 60'; Ian Louis Kabes (yellow card) 71' (yellow-red card) 119'; Imanuel Wanggai (yellow card) 83'	(Laporan)	Keith Gumbs 11' (pen.) (yellow card) 22'; Pavel Solomin 65'; Tony Sucipto (yellow card) 73'; Arif Suyono (yellow card) 99'
Penalties
Victor Igbonefo (penalty missed); Gerald Pangkali (penalty missed); Ricardo Salampessy (penalty scored); Imanuel Wanggai (penalty missed)	1 – 3	(penalty scored) Keith Gumbs; (penalty scored) Pavel Solomin; (penalty scored) Rahmat M. Rivai; (penalty missed) Zah Rahan Karangar

Gelora Delta Stadium, Sidoarjo
Attendance: 1,305
Referee: Djumadi Effendi

==== Persik – Arema ====
July 28, 2010
20.00 WIB

Persik Kediri	0 – 4 (HT : 0 – 0)	Arema Indonesia
Mekan Nasyrov (yellow card) 34'; Zhang Shuo (yellow card) 45'; Jefri Dwi Hadi (yellow card) 70'; Fauzi Toldo (red card) 80'	(Laporan)	M. Ridhuan (yellow card) 44' (goal) 51'; Zulkifli Syukur (yellow card) 45'; Irfan Raditya 47'; Moch. Fahkrudin 82'; Rahmat Affandi 88'; Pierre Njanka Beyaka (yellow card) 90'

Gelora Delta Stadium, Sidoarjo
Attendance: 22,537
Referee: Oki Dwi Putra Senjaya

=== Third place ===
July 31, 2010
15.00 WIB

Persipura Jayapura	0 – 1 (HT : 0 – 1)	Persik Kediri
Kristian David Uron (yellow card) 77'	(Laporan)	Dodit Effendi 7'; Kusnul Yuli (yellow card) 26'; Onorionde Kughegbe (yellow card) 45'; Mahyadi Panggabean (yellow card) 88'

Manahan Stadium, Solo
Attendance: 4,155
Referee: Armando Pribadi

=== Final ===
August 1, 2010
20.00 WIB

Sriwijaya FC	2 – 1 (HT: 0 – 0)	Arema Indonesia
Gumbs 47'; Solomin 80'	(Laporan)	M. Ridhuan 72'

Manahan Stadium, Solo
Attendance: 30,000
Referee: Jimmy Napitupulu (South Jakarta)

== Top goalscorers ==
Cristian Gonzalez won the Top Scorer Award with 10 goals.

Rank	Player	Club	Goals
1	(Indonesia) Cristian Gonzalez	Persib Bandung	10
2	(Thailand) Pipat Thonkanya	Persisam Samarinda	9
3	(Indonesia) Zaenal Arif	Persisam Samarinda	8
3	(Indonesia) Boaz Solossa	Persipura Jayapura	8
5	(Indonesia) Saktiawan Sinaga	Persik Kediri	7
6	(Saint Kitts and Nevis) Keith Gumbs	Sriwijaya FC	5
6	(Indonesia) Gerald Pangkali	Persipura Jayapura	5
6	(Indonesia) Bambang Pamungkas	Persija Jakarta	5
6	(Nigeria) Victor Igbonefo	Persipura Jayapura	5

== See also ==
- 2009–10 Indonesia Super League
- 2009-10 Liga Indonesia Premier Division
