= 2013 Pro Duta FC season =

Pro Duta F.C
2013 season
- CEO: Wahyu Wahab
- Head Coach: Ansyari Lubis
- Stadium: Teladan, Medan, Indonesia
Home colours	Away colours

Pro Duta Football Club played in Indonesian Premier League in 2013. This season is the first time for Pro Duta FC to compete in the top level of Indonesia's professional league. Their homebase is in Teladan, Medan.

== Players ==
=== First team squad 2013 ===
Note: Flags indicate national team as defined under FIFA eligibility rules; some limited exceptions apply. Players may hold more than one non-FIFA nationality.

No.	Pos.	Nation	Player
2	FW	IDN	Muhammad Halim
3	DF	IDN	Sutrisno
4	MF	ESP	Jose Antonio Galan
5	DF	IDN	Muhammad Rifqi
6	MF	IDN	Tino Ardila
7	MF	IDN	Faisal Azmi
8	MF	IDN	Rahmat Hidayat
9	FW	IDN	Yusuf Effendi
10	FW	IDN	Ghozali Muharam Siregar
12	MF	IDN	Abdul Majid Mony
14	MF	IDN	Muhammad Nur Adli
16	DF	IDN	Rahmadhany Fidnadi

No.	Pos.	Nation	Player
17	FW	IDN	Roy Munthe
18	FW	LVA	Ģirts Karlsons
20	DF	IDN	Muhammad Syamir
21	DF	IDN	Saralim Sowahu
22	GK	IDN	Yudha Hananta
23	DF	IDN	Hardiansyah Lubis
25	DF	IDN	Suyatno (captain)
26	MF	IDN	Agus Pranoto
27	DF	IDN	Agus Nova Wiantara
28	FW	IDN	Indra Kembar Bungsu
30	GK	LVA	Deniss Romanovs
42	FW	IDN	Arif Sajali

== Friendly Matches ==
19 January 2013	Pro Duta FC (Indonesia)	0 – 0	Indonesia	Medan, Indonesia
08:00 UTC+7		Report		Stadium: USU Mini Stadium

28 July 2013	Pro Duta FC (Indonesia)	11 – 0	(Indonesia) Dragon FC	Medan
	Rahmat Hidayat 13', 25', 43'; Yusuf Effendi 17'; Faisal Azmi 29'; Ghozali Muharram Siregar 49' (pen.); Marco Pantone 53', 76'; Muhammad Nur Adli 63'; Indra 88'	Report (in Indonesian)		Stadium: TD Pardede Stadium

31 July 2013	Pro Duta FC (Indonesia)	1 – 0	(Indonesia) Gumarang FC	Medan
	Marco Pantone 88'	Report		Stadium: TD Pardede Stadium

3 August 2013	Pro Duta FC (Indonesia)	3 – 0	(Indonesia) PS Tasbi	Medan
	Saralim Sowahu 8'; Rahmat Hidayat 56'; Yusuf Effendi 79'	Report		Stadium: TD Pardede Stadium

=== Pro Duta FC Dare To Dream Tour 2013 ===
11 August 2013	TSV Winsen (Germany)	0 – 7	(Indonesia) Pro Duta FC	Winsen (Luhe), Germany
		Report (in Indonesian)	Arif Sajali 27'; Rahmat Hidayat 29'; Yusuf Effendi 32'; Ghozali Muharam Siregar 44', 50'; Muhammad Nur Adli 73'; Muhammad Syamir 78'	Stadium: Jahn-Stadion

13 August 2013	Hamburg SV (Germany)	4 – 0	(Indonesia) Pro Duta FC	Hamburg, Germany
22.30 UTC+7	Dennis Aogo 3'; Gojko Kačar 15'; Biester 24'; Valmir Nafiu 68'	Report (in Indonesian); Report (in German)		Stadium: Training ground in Imtech Arena; Referee: Patrick Ittrich (Hamburg)

15 August 2013	Hamburg SV U-23 (Germany)	4 – 0	(Indonesia) Pro Duta FC	Hamburg, Germany
22.30 UTC+7	Treffern von Johann Buttler 8'; Nils Brüning 32'; Isaac Akyere 65'; Josef Shirdel 75'	Report (in German)		Stadium: Training ground in Imtech Arena

17 August 2013	AS Roma Primavera (Italy)	4 – 1	(Indonesia) Pro Duta FC	Rome, Italy
	James Ferri; Francesco; Lorenzo Pellegrini; Mariano	Report (in Indonesian)	Ghozali Muharam Siregar

19 August 2013	AS Pro Cisterna (Italy)	3 – 2	(Indonesia) Pro Duta FC	Cisterna di Latina, Italy
		Report (in Indonesian)	Ģirts Karlsons; Rahmat Hidayat	Stadium: Fiuggi Lazio Training Ground

22 August 2013	Jong Ajax (Netherlands)	1 – 0	(Indonesia) Pro Duta FC	Amsterdam, Netherlands
22.30 UTC+7	de Kamps 41'	Report (in Dutch)		Stadium: Sportpark De Toekomst

17 November 2013	Buriram United FC (Thailand)	4 – 3	(Indonesia) Pro Duta FC	Buriram, Thailand
	Jay Simpson; Ekkachai Sumrei; Kittiphong Pluemjai	Report (in Indonesian)	Rahmat Hidayat 61', 80'; Ghozali Muharam Siregar 90'	Stadium: New I-Mobile Stadium

== Competitions ==
=== Indonesia Premier League ===
==== Fixtures and Result ====
===== IPL 2013 =====
IPL 2013 Putaran I

16 February 2013 1	Pro Duta FC (Indonesia)	0 – 2	(Indonesia) Semen Padang FC	Lubuk Pakam
		Report	Vizcarra 7'; Wilson Jr 20'	Stadium: Baharoeddin Siregar Stadium

27 February 2013 2	Pro Duta FC (Indonesia)	0 – 0	(Indonesia) Persiba Bantul	Lubuk Pakam
		Report		Stadium: Baharoeddin Siregar Stadium

2 March 2013 3	Pro Duta FC (Indonesia)	2 – 0	(Indonesia) Arema FC	Lubuk Pakam
	Arif Sajali 40'; Yusuf Effendi 71'	Report		Stadium: Baharoeddin Siregar Stadium

26 March 2013 4	Persija Jakarta (Indonesia)	0 – 3	(Indonesia) Pro Duta FC	Karawang
			Win by WO	Stadium: Singaperbangsa

29 March 2013 5	Persijap Jepara (Indonesia)	0 – 2	(Indonesia) Pro Duta FC	Jepara
		Report	Rahmat Hidayat 54'; Ghozali M Siregar 75'	Stadium: Gelora Bumi Kartini

14 April 2013 6	Pro Duta FC (Indonesia)	3 – 0	(Indonesia) Bontang FC	Medan
	Karlsons 12', 56'; Hidayat 44'	Report		Stadium: Teladan Stadium

18 April 2013 7	Pro Duta FC (Indonesia)	1 – 1	(Indonesia) Persebaya 1927	Lubuk Pakam
	Hidayat 49'	Report	Karlovic 54'	Stadium: Baharoeddin Siregar Stadium

4 May 2013 8	Perseman Manokwari (Indonesia)	1 – 1	(Indonesia) Pro Duta FC	Sleman
	Kaimu 65'	Report	Karlsons 40'	Stadium: Maguwoharjo Stadium

8 May 2013 9	PSM Makassar (Indonesia)	2 – 0	(Indonesia) Pro Duta FC	Makassar
	Ilija Spasojevic 35'; Andi Oddang 66'	Report		Stadium: Andi Mattalatta

12 June 2013 10	Pro Duta FC (Indonesia)	3 – 0	(Indonesia) Persiraja Banda Aceh	Medan
	Ghozali Siregar 49'; Rahmad Hidayat 58', 78'	Report		Stadium: Teladan Stadium

15 June 2013 11	Pro Duta FC (Indonesia)	1 – 1	(Indonesia) PSLS Lhokseumawe	Medan
	Sajali 58'	Report	Raul Sciucatti 20'	Stadium: Teladan Stadium

22 June 2013 12	Persema FC (Indonesia)	0 – 3	(Indonesia) Pro Duta FC	Sleman
		Report	Rahmad Hidayat 73'; Karlsons 78'; Gozali Siregar 88'	Stadium: Maguwoharjo Stadium

27 June 2013 13	PSIR Rembang (Indonesia)	1 – 0	(Indonesia) Pro Duta FC	Rembang
	Lenglolo 11' (pen.)	Report		Stadium: Krida Stadium

3 July 2013 14	Pro Duta FC (Indonesia)	3 – 0	(Indonesia) Persibo Bojonegoro	Medan
	Win by WO	Report		Stadium: Teladan Stadium

6 July 2013 15	Pro Duta FC (Indonesia)	2 – 0	(Indonesia) Persepar Palangkaraya	Medan
	Rahmat 19' (pen.); Sajali 30'	Report		Stadium: Teladan Stadium

IPL 2013 Putaran II

7 September 2013 16	Persiba Bantul (Indonesia)	1 – 0	(Indonesia) Pro Duta FC	Bantul
16:00 UTC+7	Ugik Sugiyanto 53'	Report (in Indonesian)		Stadium: Sultan Agung Stadium

14 September 2013 17	Pro Duta FC (Indonesia)	2 – 0	(Indonesia) Persijap Jepara	Medan
16:00 UTC+7	Rahmat 7', 34' (pen.)	Report		Stadium: Teladan Stadium

18 September 2013 18	Bontang FC (Indonesia)	1 – 6	(Indonesia) Pro Duta FC	Bontang
16:00 UTC+07:00	Abdul Rahman 87' (pen.)	Report (in Indonesian)	Ghozali 42', 65', 75'; Girts Karlsons 50', 58', 90'	Stadium: Mulawarman Stadium

21 September 2013 19	Persebaya 1927 (Indonesia)	1 – 3	(Indonesia) Pro Duta FC	Surabaya
15:00 UTC+07:00	Han Ji Ho 31'	Report (in Indonesian)	Rahmad Hidayat 61', 63'; Yusuf Effendi 88'	Stadium: Gelora Bung Tomo Stadium

24 September 2013 20	Arema FC (Indonesia)	0 – 3	(Indonesia) Pro Duta FC	Malang
16:00 UTC+07:00		Report	Win by WO	Stadium: Kanjuruhan Stadium

29 September 2013 21	Pro Duta FC (Indonesia)	3 – 0	(Indonesia) Perseman Manokwari	Medan
16:00 UTC+7	Rahmat 68'; Arif Sajali 70'; Ghozali 76'	Report		Stadium: Teladan Stadium

2 October 2013 22	Pro Duta FC (Indonesia)	2 – 0	(Indonesia) PSM Makasar	Medan
16:00 UTC+7	Donny Fernando Siregar 61'; Ģirts Karlsons 71'	Report		Stadium: Teladan Stadium

League table

Pos	Team	Pld	W	D	L	GF	GA	GD	Pts	Qualification or relegation
1	Semen Padang	16	13	2	1	46	6	+40	41	Get wildcard to advance league verification and 2013 Premier League Final (Note: A PSSI extraordinary congress resulted in a decision to merge the two leagues into one in the 2014 season with a name Super League. Therefore Premier League (IPL) clubs would have 4 teams eligible to appear in the new league, the quota taken from the four best teams in the IPL 2013 season.)
2	Perseman Manokwari	19	12	3	4	39	12	+27	39	Advance to Play-off round
3	Pro Duta	19	11	4	4	33	11	+22	37	Advance to Play-off round
4	Persiba Bantul	18	11	2	5	41	21	+20	35	Advance to Play-off round
5	Persebaya 1927	18	10	4	4	35	19	+16	34	Disqualified from the league (Note: Persebaya 1927 and Arema Indonesia was disqualified as they did not meet the conditions for PSSI membership.)
6	PSM Makassar	18	10	2	6	27	12	+15	32	Advance to Play-off round
7	PSIR Rembang	20	9	4	7	33	42	−9	31	Advance to Play-off round
8	Persijap Jepara	19	9	3	7	32	16	+16	30	Advance to Play-off round
9	Persepar Palangkaraya	21	8	6	7	25	25	0	30	Advance to Play-off round
10	Persiraja Banda Aceh	19	7	4	8	23	28	−5	25	Advance to Play-off round
11	PSLS Lhokseumawe	19	7	4	8	29	34	−5	25	Advance to Play-off round
12	Arema Indonesia	18	5	2	11	19	42	−23	17	Disqualified from the league
13	Bontang FC	18	4	2	12	21	51	−30	14	Advance to Play-off round
14	Persema Malang	15	3	0	12	15	40	−25	9	Disqualified from the league (Note: Persibo Bojonegoro, Persema Malang and Jakarta FC were disqualified for walking out too many matches.)
15	Persibo Bojonegoro	15	2	1	12	6	39	−33	7	Disqualified from the league
16	Jakarta FC	15	1	1	13	11	37	−26	4	Disqualified from the league

Updated to match(es) played on 4 September 2013. Source: IPL Table
Rules for classification: 1) points; 2) goal difference; 3) number of goals scored.

===== IPL 2013 Playoff =====
Group K: Matches

16 Oct 2013	Pro Duta FC (Indonesia)	1 – 1	(Indonesia) Persijap Jepara	Gelora Bumi Kartini, Jepara
19:30 WIB	Karlsons 25'	Report	Noor Hadi 86'

18 Oct 2013	PSM Makassar (Indonesia)	0 – 1	(Indonesia) Pro Duta FC	Gelora Bumi Kartini, Jepara
19:00 WIB		Report	Karlsons 89'

22 Oct 2013	Pro Duta FC (Indonesia)	6 – 0	(Indonesia) PSLS Lhokseumawe	Gelora Bumi Kartini, Jepara
19:00 WIB	Agus 16'; Karlsons 35', 49', 51'; Efendi 85'; Sajali 87'

24 Oct 2013	Bontang FC (Indonesia)	0 – 6	(Indonesia) Pro Duta FC	Gelora Bumi Kartini, Jepara
19:00 WIB			Agus 47'; Karlsons 48', 60'; Siregar 57'; Romanovs 72' (pen.); Hidayat 90'

Group K: Playoff League Table

Pos	Team	Pld	W	D	L	GF	GA	GD	Pts	Qualification or relegation
1	Pro Duta	4	3	1	0	14	1	+13	10	Advances to Semi-finals and qualified to 2014 leagues verification
2	PSM	4	3	0	1	11	2	+9	9	Qualified to 2014 leagues verification
3	Persijap Jepara	4	2	1	1	9	3	+6	7	Qualified to 2014 leagues verification
4	Bontang FC (R)	4	1	0	3	5	16	−11	3	Relegation to 2014 Premier Division
5	PSLS Lhokseumawe (R)	4	0	0	4	3	18	−15	0	Relegation to 2014 Premier Division

(R) Relegated

Final Stage

28 Oct 2013	Pro Duta FC (Indonesia)	3 – 2	(Indonesia) Persepar Palangkaraya	Sultan Agung Stadium, Bantul
15:30 WIB	Hidayat 14'; Sajali 59'; Majid 67'		Kim Sang-Duk 28', 83' (pen.)
