= Rotinsulu (surname) =

Rotinsulu is a surname, and may refer to:

- Ferry Rotinsulu (Born 1982), Former Indonesian Footballer
- Jolene Marie Rotinsulu (Born 1996), Indonesian disability rights activity, and actress
