= Zamrun =

Zamrun is an Indonesian surname. Notable people with the surname include:

- Zulham Zamrun (born 1988), Indonesian footballer
- Zulvin Zamrun (born 1988), Indonesian footballer, twin brother of Zulham
