= Igor Joksimović =

Bosnian Serb footballer

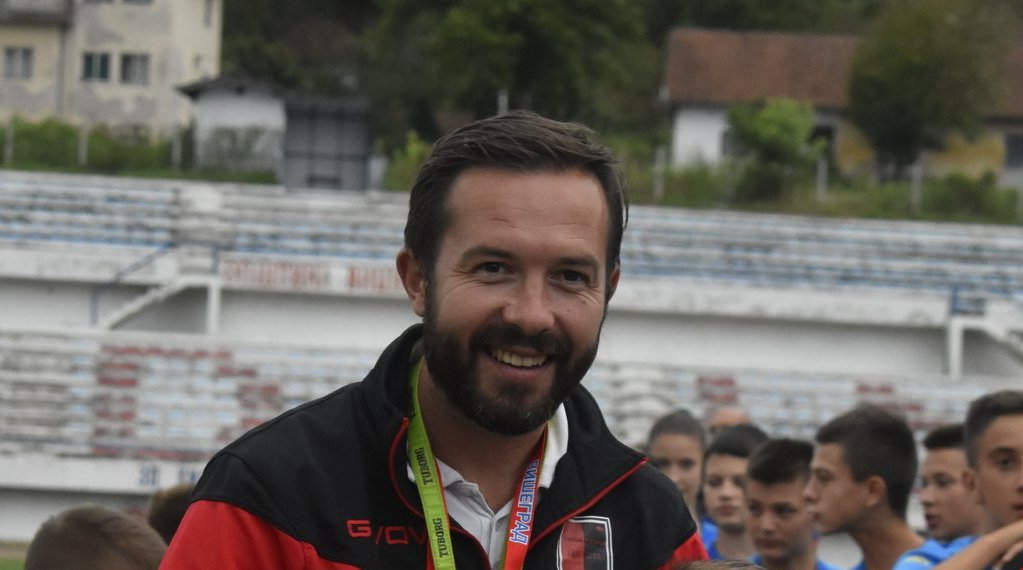
- Joksimović in 2022

Personal information
- Full name: Igor Joksimović
- Date of birth: 16 August 1980 (age 46)
- Place of birth: Trebinje, SFR Yugoslavia
- Height: 1.85 m (6 ft 1 in)
- Position: Striker
	Leotar	24	(6)
2003–2004	Rudar Ugljevik	13	(5)
2004–2005	Leotar	11	(0)
2005	PSIS Semarang	28	(11)
2006	Zakarpattia Uzhhorod	4	(0)
2006–2008	FK Zemun	20	(10)
2006	→ AC Oulu (loan)	15	(7)
2007–2008	→ Ararat Yerevan	15	(6)
2008–2009	Shkumbini	11	(0)
2009	Sloboda Tuzla	27	(8)
2010	Modriča	27	(9)
2010	Leotar		
2011	Bratstvo		
2012	Denia		

Igor Joksimović (Serbian Cyrillic: Игор Јоксимовић; born 16 August 1980) is a Bosnian Serb retired football striker.

== Club career ==
He played in the youth team of Partizan from 1995 to 2002. In 2002 move to home city and signed for FK Leotar where was champion in his first season.Good performance in few season in Leotar recommend him in Ukraine football 2005. He had good experience in Asian football where play well for PSIS Semarang in Highest Level Division in Indonesia on 2007.

He signed for KF Shkumbini in January 2009. However, he then quit the club on 20 May 2009 along with Cvete Deliovski, Ahmed Mujdragić, the club president and the club's manager. He returned to Bosnian football for 3 years, to have his last episode in the Spanish CD Denia, a member of the fourth Spanish league, where he ends his career.
