= Fauzan Jamal =

Indonesian association footballer

Personal information
- Full name: Muhammad Fauzan Jamal
- Date of birth: 6 June 1988 (age 38)
- Place of birth: Padang, Indonesia
- Height: 1.80 m (5 ft 11 in)
- Position: Centre-back

Senior career*
Years	Team	Apps	(Gls)
2008–2010	Semen Padang	27	(0)
2011–2012	Persidafon Dafonsoro	13	(0)
2013–2014	Persijap Jepara	19	(0)
2015	Bhayangkara	0	(0)
2016	Persijap Jepara	9	(0)
2016	Persela Lamongan	3	(0)
2017	Madura Utama	4	(0)
2017–2018	Persijap Jepara	7	(0)
2018–2019	PSM Makassar	13	(0)
2019	PSIS Semarang	0	(0)
2020–2021	Kalteng Putra	8	(0)
2021–2022	Persiba Balikpapan	4	(2)

International career
2009	Indonesia U23		
- * Club domestic league appearances and goals as of 00:15, 26 September 2022 (UTC)

Muhammad Fauzan Jamal (born 6 June 1988 in Padang) is an Indonesian professional footballer who plays as a centre-back.

== Club career ==
=== Persebaya (Bhayangkara) ===
On 25 December 2014, he signed one-year contract with Persebaya Bhayangkara and was announced as a Persebaya player.

=== Persela Lamongan ===
On 13 September 2016, he signed one-year contract with Persela Lamongan where he played in this club as a left back to replace Zulvin Zamrun who resigned.

=== Persepam Madura Utama ===
On 10 February 2017, he signed a contract with Liga 2 club Persepam Madura Utama.

=== Persijap Jepara ===
In August 2017, he rejoined his old club, Persijap Jepara in second round of competition. he was quite enthusiastic about returning to Persijap. The offer of direct management was greeted by him.

=== PSM Makassar ===
On 13 March 2018, Fauzan signed a one-year contract with Liga 1 club PSM Makassar. He took the number 25 shirt for the 2018 Liga 1 season. Fauzan made his debut on 25 March 2018 in a match against PSM Makassar.

=== PSIS Semarang ===
He was signed for PSIS Semarang to play in Liga 1 in the 2019 season.

=== Kalteng Putra ===
In 2020, Fauzan Jamal signed a one-year contract with Indonesian Liga 2 club Kalteng Putra.

== International career ==
In 2009, Jamal represented the Indonesia U-23, in the 2009 Southeast Asian Games.
