= 2007–08 Liga Indonesia Premier Division =

Liga Indonesia Premier Division
- Season: 2007–08
- Dates: 10 February 2007 – 10 February 2008
- Champions: Sriwijaya; 1st Premier Division title 1st Indonesian title
- Relegated: 18 teams
- AFC Champions League: Sriwijaya; PSMS
- Matches: 627
- Goals: 1,459 (2.33 per match)
- Top goalscorer: Cristian Gonzáles (32 goals)
- Biggest home win: Persiwa 7–0 Persma (27 December 2007)
- Biggest away win: Persebaya 0–3 Persiba (26 April 2007); Persekabpas 0–3 Persmin (18 August 2007); Persegi 1–4 Persis (11 September 2007)
- Highest scoring: Persebaya 5–3 Persmin (7 April 2007); Persibom 5–3 Persma (28 April 2007); Persijap 3–5 Arema (18 October 2007); Persik 6–2 PSS (27 October 2007)

The 2007–08 Liga Indonesia Premier Division (also known as the Liga Djarum Indonesia for sponsorship reasons) was the 13th season of the Liga Indonesia Premier Division as well as its final season as the top Indonesian professional league for association football clubs.

== Overview ==
It was contested by 36 teams. The season began on 10 February 2007 and the last games played on 10 February 2008. and Sriwijaya won the championship.

== Teams ==
=== Promoted from First Division ===
- Persebaya
- Persis
- Persma
- PSSB
- Pelita Jaya
- Persiraja
- Perseman
- Persikabo

=== Stadiums and locations ===
Locations of the teams in the 2007–08 Liga Indonesia Premier Division.
Blue: West Region; Red: East Region

== Foreign players ==
=== West ===
Club	Player 1	Player 2	Player 3	Player 4	Player 5
Pelita Jaya	(Brazil) Cristiano Lopes	(Brazil) Vagner Luís	(Croatia) Ivan Jerković	(Guinea) Boubacar Keita	(Sierra Leone) Lamin Conteh
Persela	(Argentina) Gustavo López	(Argentina) Maximiliano Vallejo	(Brazil) Fabiano	(Brazil) Márcio Souza	(Cameroon) Nyeck Nyobe
Persema	(Brazil) Cauê Benicio	(Chile) Alain Astudillo	(Mali) Alseny Diawara	(Paraguay) Alfredo Raul Reyes	(Paraguay) Sergio Fernández
Persib	(Cameroon) Bekamenga	(Chile) Patricio Jiménez	(Morocco) Redouane Barkaoui	(Paraguay) Lorenzo Cabanas	(Romania) Leontin Chițescu
Persija	(Argentina) Robertino Pugliara	(Argentina) Rubén Cecco	(Cameroon) Herman Abanda	(Moldova) Evgheni Hmaruc	(Sierra Leone) Mustapha Sama
Persik	(Brazil) Danilo Fernando	(Liberia) Fallah Johnson	(Nigeria) Peter Lipede	(Uruguay) Cristian Gonzáles	(Uruguay) Ronald Fagundez
Persikabo	(Argentina) Rodrigo Santoni	(Cameroon) David Pagbe	(Cameroon) Roger Batoum	(Cameroon) Salomon Koubé	(Cameroon) Seme Pattrick
Persikota	(Argentina) Esteban Busto	(Brazil) Bruno Zandonaide	(Cameroon) Essa Basile	(Cameroon) Hugues Nanmi	(Uruguay) Esteban Guillén
Persiraja	(Argentina) Fernando Pages	(Brazil) Antônio Teles	(Brazil) Claudionor	(Brazil) Robson Cangirana	(Liberia) Roberto Kwateh
Persita	(Cameroon) Andela Atangana	(Cameroon) Ernest Siangkam	(Cameroon) Marcel Mahouvé	(Liberia) Esaiah Benson	(Liberia) Stephen Mennoh
Persitara	(Burkina Faso) Germain Bationo	(Cameroon) Ebenje Rudolf	(Cameroon) Ngako Gabriel	(Liberia) John Tarkpor	(Singapore) Itimi Dickson
PSDS	(Cameroon) Guy Hervé	(Chile) Christian Riffo	(Nigeria) Osas Saha	(Paraguay) Denis Antonio	(Paraguay) Edgar Anasco
PSIS	(Bosnia and Herzegovina) Igor Joksimović	(Brazil) Joao Carlos	(Chile) Julio Lopez	(Cameroon) Didier Koutozi	(Cameroon) Zoubairou
PSMS	(Argentina) Andrés Formento	(Argentina) Gustavo Chena	(Cameroon) Mbom Julien	(Liberia) James Lomell	(Liberia) Murphy Nagbe
PSS	(Argentina) Gastón Castaño	(Brazil) Anderson Silva	(Guinea) Souleymane Traore	(Mali) Mamadou Niane	(Nigeria) George Oyedepo
PSSB	(Brazil) Antonio Placide	(Cameroon) Noah Romuald	(Paraguay) Diego Mendieta	(Paraguay) Roberto Acosta	
Semen Padang	(Guinea) Abdoulaye Djibril	(Nigeria) Gbeneme Friday	(Palestine) Patricio Acevedo	(Paraguay) Alcidio Fleitas	(Paraguay) Eleno Pereira
Sriwijaya	(Brazil) Carlos Renato	(Cameroon) Christian Lenglolo	(Liberia) Zah Rahan	(Nigeria) Anoure Obiora	(Saint Kitts and Nevis) Keith Gumbs

=== East ===
club	Player 1	Player 2	Player 3	Player 4	Player 5
Arema	(Cameroon) Bruno Casimir	(Cameroon) Emalue Serge	(Cameroon) Émile Mbamba	(Chile) Patricio Morales	(Morocco) Tarik El Janaby
Deltras	(Argentina) Claudio Pronetto	(Argentina) José Sebastián	(Brazil) Hilton Moreira	(Paraguay) Christian René	(Serbia) Saša Branežac
Persebaya	(Argentina) Juan Vallejos	(Brazil) Adinaldo	(Cameroon) Augustin Kettor	(Cameroon) Raymond Nsangue	(Liberia) Anthony Ballah
Persegi	(Brazil) Fernando Andrade	(Cameroon) Christian Kono	(Cameroon) Didier Belibi	(Chile) Esteban Valencia	(Chile) Óscar Aravena
Persekabpas	(Chile) Francisco Rotunno	(Liberia) Alexander Robinson	(Paraguay) Arturo Villasanti	(Paraguay) Edgar Rolón	(Paraguay) Rodrigo Moreira
Perseman	(Argentina) Carlos Gomez	(Brazil) Reginaldo Estevao	(Liberia) Buston Brown	(Liberia) Christopher Wreh	(Paraguay) Rodrigo Mendoza
Persiba	(Australia) Robert Gaspar	(Brazil) Elisangelo Jardim	(Brazil) Júlio Rodrigues	(Chile) Javier Rocha	(England) Ryan Townsend
Persibom	(Chile) Rodrigo Araya	(Brazil) Antônio Cláudio	(Nigeria) Kingsley Chioma	(Paraguay) Arnaldo Villalba	(Paraguay) Pedro Velázquez
Persijap	(Brazil) Amarildo	(Brazil) Evaldo Silva	(Brazil) Leandro Braga	(Thailand) Paitoon Tiepma	
Persipura	(Brazil) Beto	(Brazil) David da Rocha	(Cameroon) Bio Paulin	(Nigeria) Ernest Jeremiah	(Nigeria) Victor Igbonefo
Persis Solo	(Australia) Okwy Diamondstar	(Cameroon) Sylvain Moukwelle	(Liberia) Frank Seator	(Nigeria) Ebi Sukore	(Nigeria) Greg Nwokolo
Persiter	(Brazil) Emerson	(Brazil) Fabricio Pereira	(Brazil) Júlio César	(Brazil) Wilson Carvalho	(Liberia) Joseph Amoah
Persiwa	(Nigeria) O.K. John	(Liberia) Boakay Foday	(Liberia) Sunday Seah	(Morocco) Tarik Chaoui	
Persma Manado	(Argentina) Juan Pablo Bazán	(Argentina) Rodrigo Cáceres	(Brazil) Jardel Santana	(Chile) Cristian Carrasco	(Chile) Leonardo Gutiérrez
Persmin	(Argentina) Mario Romero	(Brazil) Fabiano Beltrame	(Brazil) Pedro Jalet	(Cameroon) Engelbert Asse-Etoga	(Paraguay) Osvaldo Moreno
PKT Bontang	(Argentina) Ricardo Silva	(Brazil) Vitor	(Guinea) Fodé Camara	(Liberia) Josiah Seton	
PSIM	(Brazil) Carlos Pablo	(Brazil) Jack Jones	(Brazil) Leonardo Rachid	(Chile) Jaime Sandoval	(Paraguay) Wilfredo Genes
PSM	(Paraguay) Aldo Barreto	(Paraguay) Carlos Bergottini	(Togo) Ali Khaddafi	(Togo) Badarou Saibou	(Togo) Nomo Teh Marco

== First stage ==
=== West Region ===
Pos	Team	Pld	W	D	L	GF	GA	GD	Pts	Qualification
1	Sriwijaya (C)	34	20	6	8	59	31	+28	66	Advance to second stage and qualification for Indonesia Super League
2	Persija	34	18	7	9	55	40	+15	61	Advance to second stage and qualification for Indonesia Super League
3	PSMS	34	17	7	10	44	28	+16	58	Advance to second stage and qualification for Indonesia Super League
4	Persik	34	17	5	12	61	51	+10	56	Advance to second stage and qualification for Indonesia Super League
5	Persib	34	15	9	10	45	29	+16	54	Qualification for Indonesia Super League
6	Persela	34	15	9	10	41	34	+7	54	Qualification for Indonesia Super League
7	Persitara	34	15	8	11	39	33	+6	53	Qualification for Indonesia Super League
8	Pelita Jaya	34	15	7	12	43	30	+13	52	Qualification for Indonesia Super League
9	Persita	34	13	11	10	33	36	−3	50	Qualification for Indonesia Super League
10	PSIS (Note: PSIS Semarang were granted a place in the Indonesia Super League through a verification process after Persiter Ternate and Persmin Minahasa withdrew.)	34	13	10	11	44	34	+10	49	Qualification for Indonesia Super League
11	Persikabo (R)	34	12	12	10	46	38	+8	48	Relegation to the Premier Division (Note: From the 2008–09 season, the Indonesia Super League was established as the new first tier with the Premier Division demoted to second tier status.)
12	PSS (R)	34	12	10	12	42	43	−1	46	Relegation to the Premier Division
13	Persema (R)	34	12	9	13	35	46	−11	45	Relegation to the Premier Division
14	PSDS (R)	34	12	8	14	39	40	−1	44	Relegation to the Premier Division
15	Persikota (R)	34	6	12	16	26	41	−15	30	Relegation to the Premier Division
16	Semen Padang (R)	34	7	6	21	21	44	−23	27	Relegation to the Premier Division
17	Persiraja (R)	34	6	8	20	18	59	−41	26	Relegation to the Premier Division
18	PSSB (R)	34	6	6	22	26	60	−34	24	Relegation to the Premier Division

Source: RSSSF

=== East Region ===
Pos	Team	Pld	W	D	L	GF	GA	GD	Pts	Qualification
1	Persipura	34	19	7	8	54	24	+30	64	Advance to second stage and qualification for Indonesia Super League
2	Persiwa	34	18	5	11	56	30	+26	59	Advance to second stage and qualification for Indonesia Super League
3	Deltras	34	17	8	9	47	30	+17	59	Advance to second stage and qualification for Indonesia Super League
4	Arema	34	15	12	7	45	28	+17	57	Advance to second stage and qualification for Indonesia Super League
5	PSM	34	17	6	11	43	33	+10	57	Qualification for Indonesia Super League
6	Persiter (R)	34	17	6	11	33	28	+5	57	Relegation to the Premier Division (Note: From the 2008–09 season, the Indonesia Super League was established as the new first tier with the Premier Division demoted to second tier status.)
7	Persiba	34	16	7	11	48	35	+13	55	Qualification for Indonesia Super League
8	Persmin (R)	34	14	11	9	43	34	+9	53	Relegation to the Premier Division
9	Persijap	34	15	7	12	38	36	+2	52	Qualification for Indonesia Super League
10	Persibom (R)	34	13	7	14	41	47	−6	46	Relegation to the Premier Division
11	Persis (R)	34	12	7	15	43	43	0	43	Relegation to the Premier Division
12	Persma (R)	34	10	11	13	32	50	−18	41	Relegation to the Premier Division
13	Bontang PKT (Note: Bontang PKT were granted a place in the Indonesia Super League through a verification process after Persiter Ternate and Persmin Minahasa withdrew.)	34	10	9	15	33	42	−9	39	Qualification for Indonesia Super League
14	Persebaya (R)	34	11	6	17	36	50	−14	39	Relegation to the Premier Division
15	PSIM (R)	34	8	8	18	30	45	−15	32	Relegation to the Premier Division
16	Persekabapas (R)	34	8	8	18	34	52	−18	32	Relegation to the Premier Division
17	Perseman (R)	34	8	8	18	28	55	−27	32	Relegation to the Premier Division
18	Persegi (R)	34	6	11	17	24	46	−22	29	Relegation to the Premier Division

Source: RSSSF

== Second stage ==
=== Group A ===
Pos	Team	Pld	W	D	L	GF	GA	GD	Pts	Qualification
1	Sriwijaya	3	1	2	0	4	2	+2	5	Advance to knockout stage
2	PSMS	3	1	1	1	4	4	0	4	Advance to knockout stage
3	Arema	3	1	1	1	3	4	−1	4	
4	Persiwa	3	0	2	1	3	4	−1	2	

Source: RSSSF

=== Group B ===
Pos	Team	Pld	W	D	L	GF	GA	GD	Pts	Qualification
1	Persipura	3	2	1	0	8	1	+7	7	Advance to knockout stage
2	Persija	3	1	2	0	3	2	+1	5	Advance to knockout stage
3	Persik	3	1	1	1	4	6	−2	4	
4	Deltras	3	0	0	3	0	6	−6	0	

Source: RSSSF

== Knockout stage ==
Semifinals
6 February – Jakarta
Persija	0
Sriwijaya	1
6 February – Jakarta
Persipura	0 (4)
PSMS (pen.)	0 (5)

Final
10 February – Bandung
Sriwijaya (a.e.t.)	3
PSMS	1

=== Semifinals ===
6 February 2008

Persipura	0–0 (a.e.t.)	PSMS
Penalties
Ian Louis Kabes (penalty missed); Victor Igbonefo (penalty scored); Imanuel Wanggai (penalty scored); Bachtiar (penalty scored); Ernest Jeremiah (penalty scored); David da Rocha (penalty missed)	4–5	(penalty scored) Legimin Raharjo; (penalty missed) Masferi Kasim; (penalty scored) Supardi Nasir; (penalty scored) Rommy Diaz Putra; (penalty scored) James Koko Lomell; (penalty scored) Saktiawan Sinaga

Gelora Bung Karno Stadium, Jakarta

6 February 2008

Persija	0–1	Sriwijaya
		Gumbs 19'

Gelora Bung Karno Stadium, Jakarta

=== Final ===
10 February 2008
19:15 WIB

Sriwijaya	3–1 (a.e.t.)	PSMS
Obiora 15'; Gumbs 107'; Zah 114'		Lomell 69'

Si Jalak Harupat Stadium, Bandung
Attendance: 0
Referee: Purwanto (Kediri)

== Awards ==
=== Top scorers ===
This is a list of the top scorers from the 2007–08 season.

Rank	Player	Club	Goals
1	(Uruguay) Cristian Gonzáles	Persik	32
2	(Chile) Julio Lopez	PSIS	20
3	(Brazil) Beto Goncalves	Persipura	19
3	(Liberia) James Koko Lomell	PSMS	19
5	(Liberia) Sunday Seah	Persiwa	18
6	(Indonesia) Aliyudin	Persija	17
6	(Indonesia) Bambang Pamungkas	Persija	17

=== Best player ===
(Liberia) Zah Rahan Krangar (Sriwijaya)
