= Dede Sulaiman =

Indonesian footballer

Personal information
- Full name: Dede Sulaiman
- Date of birth: 3 March 1986 (age 40)
- Place of birth: Jakarta, Indonesia
- Height: 1.82 m (6 ft 0 in)
- Position: Goalkeeper

Senior career*
Years	Team	Apps	(Gls)
2006–2007	PSDS Deli Serdang	18	(0)
2007–2009	Sriwijaya	13	(0)
2009–2011	PSPS Pekanbaru	38	(0)
2011–2012	Arema Indonesia (IPL)	22	(0)
2013	Persibo Bojonegoro	13	(0)
2014–2022	Persipura Jayapura	81	(0)
2022–2023	Persita Tangerang	1	(0)
2023–2024	Persipura Jayapura	4	(0)

International career
2005	Indonesia U20		
2007–2009	Indonesia U23		
- * Club domestic league appearances and goals as of 3 February 2024

Dede Sulaiman (born 3 March 1986) is an Indonesian professional footballer who plays as a goalkeeper.

== Honours ==
=== Club ===
Sriwijaya

- Liga Indonesia Premier Division: 2007–08
- Copa Indonesia: 2007–08, 2008–09

Persipura Jayapura

- Indonesia Soccer Championship A: 2016

=== Individual ===
- Liga 1 Team of the Season: 2019 (Substitutes)
