= Ferry Rotinsulu =

Indonesian footballer

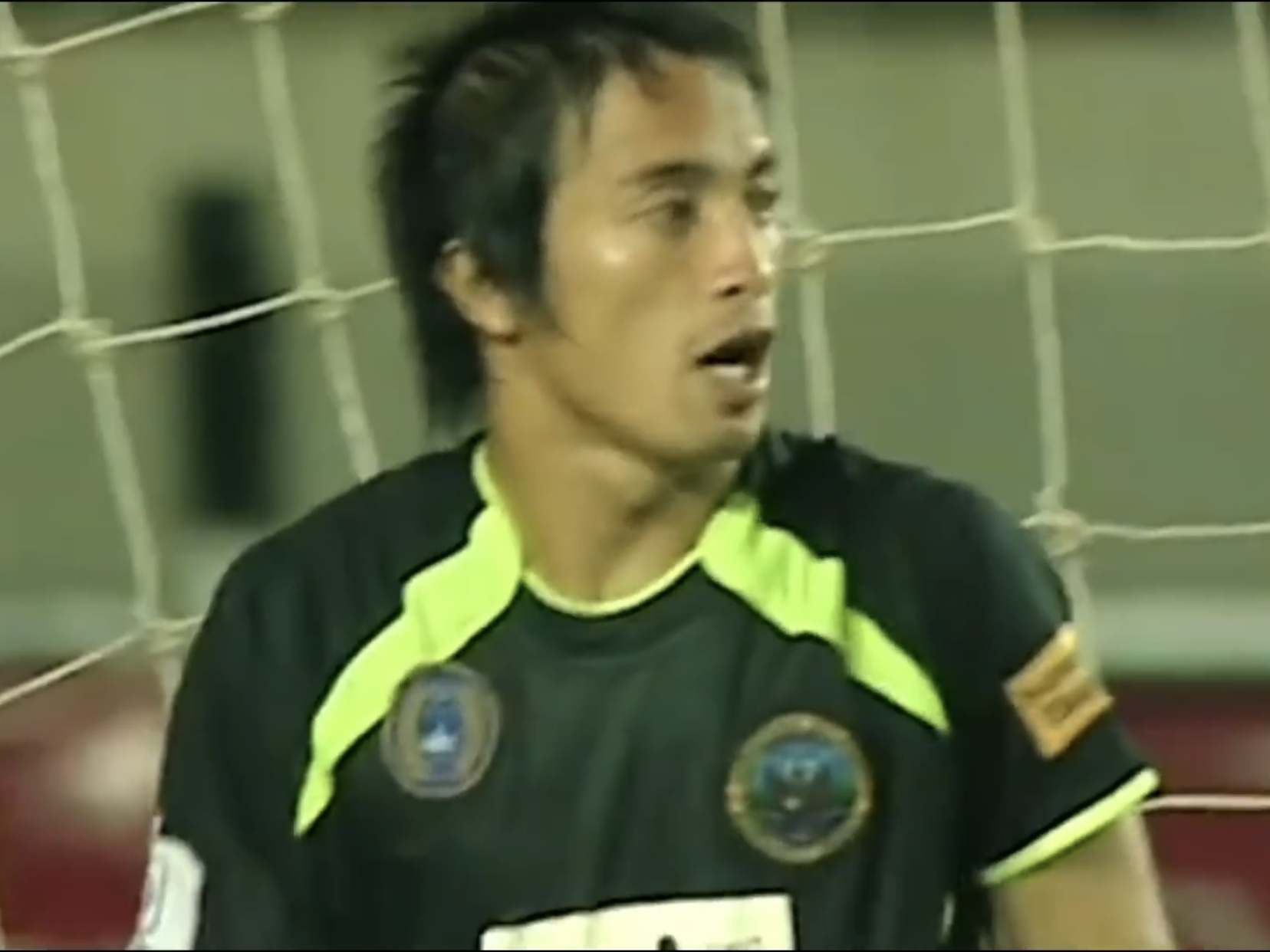
- Rotinsulu playing for Sriwijaya in 2007

Personal information
- Full name: Ferry Rotinsulu
- Date of birth: 28 December 1982 (age 43)
- Place of birth: Palu, Indonesia
- Height: 1.82 m (6 ft 0 in)
- Position: Goalkeeper

Team information
- Current team: Sriwijaya (GK coach)

Youth career
- Persijatim Solo FC

Senior career*
Years	Team	Apps	(Gls)
2001–2003	Persipal Palu	43	(0)
2003–2013	Sriwijaya	188	(0)
2013–2014	Bhayangkara	9	(0)
Total		240	(0)

International career
2005–2006	Indonesia U23		
2007–2011	Indonesia	8	(0)

Managerial career
- 2019–2025: Sriwijaya (goalkeeper coach)
- 2025–: Persipal Palu (Goalkeeper Coach)
- * Club domestic league appearances and goals

Ferry Rotinsulu (born 28 December 1982 in Palu, Central Sulawesi, Indonesia) is an Indonesian former footballer who plays as a goalkeeper.

He was a goalkeeper for the Indonesia national football team. In the Asian Cup 2007, Rotinsulu was the third goalkeeper after Yandri Pitoy and Markus Horison. He was also a former member of Indonesia U-23 Team at Sea Games 2005 Manila, Philippines, where he was the second choice goalkeeper after Syamsidar.

"I want to be the son of Palu with good contribution for nation by playing football. I wouldn't reach only halfway in my career. I want to be number one goalkeeper." Ferry said.

Arjuna Rinaldi, Sriwijaya's goalkeeping coach, said, "He is a spider on the web that's difficult to penetrate by enemies.". In 2007, Sriwijaya won double titles as the champion of Liga Indonesia 2007 and Piala Indonesia 2007. He became one of the key players in the success of the team's double winners.

Rotinsulu reportedly became a goalkeeper because he is a big fan of Italian goalkeeper Gianluigi Buffon.

Rotinsulu is a devout Muslim who observes the Islamic month of Ramadan.

== International career ==
In 2007, he represented Indonesia U-23, in the 2007 SEA Games.

== National Team Career ==
- 2005: SEA Games Manila (U-23 Team)
- 2006: National Training Centre/Camp in The Hague, Netherlands and Asian Games Qatar (U-23 Team)
- 2007: Asian Cup (Senior Team)

== Honours ==
Sriwijaya

- Liga Indonesia Premier Division: 2007–08
- Indonesia Super League: 2011–12
- Copa Indonesia/Piala Indonesia: 2007–08, 2008–09, 2010
- Indonesian Community Shield: 2010
- Indonesian Inter Island Cup: 2012

Indonesia

- Indonesian Independence Cup: 2008
- AFF Championship runner-up: 2010
