= Andrés Formento =

Argentine footballer (born 1984)

Andres Formento
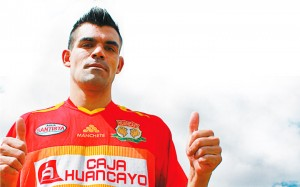
- Formento in 2012

Personal information
- Full name: Andres Miguel Formento
- Date of birth: 18 May 1984 (age 42)
- Place of birth: Recreo, Argentina
- Height: 1.84 m (6 ft 0 in)
- Position: Centre forward

Senior career*
Years	Team	Apps	(Gls)
1998–2004	Colón de Santa Fe		
2004–2005	Olivais e Moscavide		
2005–2006	Atlético Clube de Portugal		
2006–2007	Tiro Federal		
2007–2008	PSMS Medan	12	(3)
2008–2009	Atlético Ciudad		
2009	SV Elversberg	10	(0)
2009–2010	Wuppertaler SV	21	(5)
2010–2011	Jahn Regensburg	15	(2)
2011	Deportes Quindío	11	(4)
2012	Real Esppor	13	(2)
2012	Sport Huancayo	10	(1)
2013	La Equidad	5	(0)
- * Club domestic league appearances and goals

Andres Miguel Formento (born 18 May 1984) is an Argentine former professional footballer who played as a centre forward.

== Career ==
His professional career began in the lower divisions of Colón de Santa Fe during 1992–2002. Manchester City showed interest in him in 2001, but he remained at Santa Fe, as he was considered a vital player. He has played in the Portuguese league, and in Spain. In 2008, he was signed by PSMS Medan in Indonesia. In the same year, he signed with a German soccer team.

== Honours ==
PSMS Medan

- Liga Indonesia Premier Division runner up: 2007–08
