= Wijay =

Indonesian footballer

Wijay விஜய்
Personal information
- Date of birth: 29 December 1982 (age 43)
- Place of birth: Medan, Indonesia
- Height: 1.66 m (5 ft 5 1/2 in)
- Position: Midfielder

Team information
- Current team: PSMS Medan

Senior career*
Years	Team	Apps	(Gls)
2002–2003	PSMS Medan	12	
2003–2004	Persijatim	15	
2005–2009	Sriwijaya	18	(1)
2009–2010	Persebaya Surabaya	20	(0)
2010–2012	Mitra Kukar	16	(1)
2012–2013	Persepar Palangkaraya	17	
2014	Persita Tangerang	4	(0)
2014–2015	Persika Karawang	7	(0)
2015	Persikad Depok	0	(0)
2016	Persika Karawang	12	(0)

International career
2005	Indonesia U-23		
2008	Indonesia	2	(0)
- * Club domestic league appearances and goals as of 22 April 2014

Wijay or Vijay (Tamil விஜய்; born 29 December 1982, in Medan, North Sumatra) is an Indonesian football midfielder of Indian descent. Previously, he played for Persita Tangerang in the 2014 Indonesia Super League.

== Honours ==
Sriwijaya

- Liga Indonesia Premier Division: 2007–08
- Copa Indonesia: 2007–08, 2008–09
