= Joko Sidik =

Indonesian footballer

Personal information
- Full name: Joko Sidik Fitrayono
- Date of birth: 20 May 1988 (age 38)
- Place of birth: Samarinda, Indonesia
- Height: 1.75 m (5 ft 9 in)
- Position: Defender

Youth career
- 2005–2007: PKT Suratin
- 2008–2009: Bontang U-21

Senior career*
| Years | Team | Apps | (Gls) |
| 2008–2011 | Bontang | 53 | (2) |
| 2011–2013 | Putra Samarinda | 32 | (0) |
| 2014–2015 | Persiba Balikpapan | 10 | (0) |
| 2016–2017 | Mitra Kukar | 6 | (0) |
- * Club domestic league appearances and goals as of 23 October 2017

Joko Sidik Fitrayono (born May 20, 1988 in Samarinda) is an Indonesian footballer who plays as a defender.
