= Sylvain Moukwelle =

Cameroonian-French footballer (born 1978)

Personal information
- Full name: Sylvain Moukwelle Ebwanga
- Date of birth: 13 January 1978 (age 48)
- Place of birth: Douala, Cameroon
- Positions: Defender; midfielder

Youth career
- Kadji Sports Academy

Senior career*
Years	Team	Apps	(Gls)
1998–1999	FC Rouen	2	
1999–2000	FC Sion	6	(0)
2000–2001	FC Lugano	22	(1)
2001–2002	AC Bellinzona		
2002–2003	CMS Oissel		
2003–2004	Aurillac FCA		
2004–2006	CMS Oissel		
2006	Deltras Sidoarjo		
2007	Persis Solo		
2009–2010	Persiba Bantul		
2011	PSBI Blitar		
2011	CMS Oissel		
2012–2013	Persewangi Banyuwangi		

International career
1997	Cameroon		
- * Club domestic league appearances and goals

Sylvain Moukwelle (born 13 January 1978) is a Cameroonian-French retired footballer.

== Playing career ==
=== Switzerland ===
Moukwelle played for FC Sion and FC Lugano in the Swiss top flight.

=== Indonesia ===
On the verge of leaving Persewangi Banyuwangi by Autumn 2012, Moukwelle was claimed he was supposed to have been paid 237 million Indonesian rupiahs midway though October, but was hospitalized for typhoid and became even more crestfallen as he could not celebrate Christmas with his family. To make matters worse, the Kadji Sports Academy graduate's mother was treated for breast cancer and he was only given 50 million rupiahs close to February 2013, receiving enough money to purchase a ticket to France by supporter Ahmad Mustain a month later.

=== Cameroon ===
Moukwelle made two appearances for Cameroon.
