= Murphy Nagbe =

Liberian footballer

Personal information
- Full name: Murphy Kumonple Nagbe
- Date of birth: 7 June 1984 (age 42)
- Place of birth: Monrovia, Liberia
- Height: 1.83 m (6 ft 0 in)
- Position: Defender

Youth career
- 1995: Genesis

Senior career*
Years	Team	Apps	(Gls)
1999–2000	St. Anthony	14	(0)
2000–2001	NPA Anchors	26	(0)
2001–2002	LISCR	8	(0)
2003–2004	Durban Stars	16	(0)
2005–2007	Persekabpas Pasuruan	50	(2)
2007–2008	PSMS Medan	25	(1)
2009–2011	LISCR	9	(0)

International career
2002–2008	Liberia	28	(0)
- * Club domestic league appearances and goals

Murphy Kumonple Nagbe (born 7 June 1984), or simply Murphy Nagbe, is a former Liberian professional footballer who played for LISCR.

== Career ==
The defensive midfielder is also a member of the Liberia national football team.

== Honours ==
PSMS Medan

- Liga Indonesia Premier Division runner up: 2007–08
