= Guy Hervé Mahop =

Cameroonian footballer

Mahop Guy
Personal information
- Full name: Guy Hervé Mahop
- Date of birth: 26 April 1984 (age 42)
- Place of birth: Douala, Cameroon
- Height: 1.84 m (6 ft 1/2 in)
- Position: Defender

Senior career*
Years	Team	Apps	(Gls)
2006–2008	PSDS Deli Serdang	42	(3)
2008–2010	Fourway Athletics	35	(2)
2010–2011	PSCS Cilacap	26	(1)
- * Club domestic league appearances and goals as of 18 March 2010

Guy Hervé Mahop (born April 26, 1984) is a Cameroonian former footballer.
