= José Sebastián =

Argentine footballer

Jose Sebastian
Personal information
- Full name: Jose Sebastian Vasquez
- Date of birth: 24 September 1982 (age 44)
- Place of birth: Argentina
- Height: 1.80 m (5 ft 11 in)
- Position: Midfielder

Senior career*
Years	Team	Apps	(Gls)
2006–2008	Persibom Bolaang Mongondow	27	(8)
2009–2010	Deltras Sidoarjo	20	(2)
2010–2011	PSMS Medan	15	(0)
2011–2012	Persijap Jepara	33	(4)
- * Club domestic league appearances and goals as of 21 April 2012

José Sebastián Vásquez (born September 24, 1982) is an Argentine former footballer who plays as a midfielder.
