= Rommy Diaz Putra =

Indonesian footballer

Rommy Diaz
Personal information
- Full name: Rommy Diaz Putra
- Date of birth: 22 July 1980 (age 46)
- Place of birth: Batusangkar, Indonesia
- Height: 1.72 m (5 ft 8 in)
- Position: Defender

Team information
- Current team: Bontang PKT
- Number: 22

Youth career
- 1994: Diklat PPLP Padang
- 1998: Semen Padang Junior

Senior career*
Years	Team	Apps	(Gls)
1998–2006	Semen Padang	56	(2)
2006–2008	PSMS Medan	15	(0)
2008	Bontang PKT	8	(0)

International career
2003	Indonesia U-23 Team		
- * Club domestic league appearances and goals

Rommy Diaz Putra (born 22 July 1980 in Batusangkar, West Sumatra) is an Indonesian footballer. He normally plays as a defender. He is a former player for the Indonesia U-23 Team. During his first 3 seasons at Semen Padang, Rommy just sat on the bench. In 2003, his career took off under the direction of his coach, Suhatman Imam, and he was featured in the premier line-up. That confidence was repaid with good performances, and guaranteed a strong defence for Semen Padang.

His performance received special appreciation from Sergei Dubrovin, coach of the national team of Vietnam for the Sea Games XXII. He became the first choice as defence of the ‘Merah Putih’ team. "More his age, he more adult or mature. Without his contribute the became not equal or balance", said Syafrianto Rusli, architect of Semen Padang. Putra said, "First since, I want to choose position as a defensive or back player. I don't know why. But, its like, there are more challenge, for replace defender equal other position".

Although he has become a stable footballer, he is considering retirement, and he believes that his injury is telling him to retire. "I ever knee's injured during 4 months. Some make me thinking opportunity to retire from football. His luck, after medicine to anywhere, the injured can be recovered", said Ira Octaviani's husband.

== National team career ==
- 2002: futsal national team
- 2003: SEA Games Vietnam

== Honours ==
PSMS Medan

- Liga Indonesia Premier Division runner up: 2007–08
