= Mbom Mbom Julien =

Cameroonian footballer (born 1984)

Mbom Julien
Personal information
- Date of birth: 23 April 1984 (age 42)
- Place of birth: Yaounde, Cameroon
- Height: 1.83 m (6 ft 0 in)
- Position: Midfielder

Senior career*
Years	Team	Apps	(Gls)
2000	Impôts FC	21	(5)
2000–2001	Academy F.C. Brasseries	19	(6)
2001–2002	Canon Yaoundé	20	(4)
2002–2003	Dijon	7	(1)
2003–2004	Valenciennes	9	(1)
2004–2005	Pelita Jaya FC	22	(7)
2005–2008	PSMS Medan	44	(15)
2008–2009	Persema Malang	22	(6)
2009–20010	Persiram Raja Ampat	24	(8)
2010–2011	Mitra Kukar	42	(15)
2011–2012	Persika Karawang	20	(8)
2012–2013	Persita Tangerang	11	(0)
2013–2014	Persis Solo	11	(4)
2014–2015	Monrovia Club Breweries	13	(7)
2015–2016	UiTM F.C.	10	(0)
Total		295	(87)
- * Club domestic league appearances and goals

Mbom Mbom Julien (born 23 April 1984) is a Cameroonian former association footballer who plays as a midfielder.

== Career ==
His career in Indonesia took him in 2013 from Mitra Kukar F.C. to Persika Karawang.

On 29 March 2014, Mbom signed a deal with 2014 Liga Indonesia Super League clubs side Persis Solo for a one-year contract and the same year he moved to Monrovia Club Breweries FC in the 2014 Liberia League.

== Honours ==
PSMS Medan

- Liga Indonesia Premier Division runner up: 2007–08

Persema Malang

- Liga Indonesia Premier Division runner up: 2008–09
