= PS TASBI =

- Full name: Perkumpulan Sepakbola Taman Setia Budi Indah
- Nickname: Tim Rumah Baja Sumatra
- Founded: 1992
- Ground: Jalur Hijau TASBI Field
- Owner: PSSI Medan City
- Chairman: Ricky Fahreza Syafii
- Manager: Asrul Batubara
- Coach: Syarifuddin Onden
- League: Liga 4
- 2017: Liga 3, provincial phase (North Sumatra zone)

Perkumpulan Sepakbola Taman Setia Budi Indah (simply known as PS TASBI) is an Indonesian football club based in Medan, North Sumatra. They currently compete in Liga 4 North Sumatra zone.

== History ==
The club was founded in 1992 with the name TASBI Soccer School, as a forum for the development of football in the city of Medan in particular and Indonesia in general. In 2012, the club formed a team with the name TASBI Futsal Futsal Club who competed in the Amateur Futsal League since 2012. The club also formed a special management for the development of young players by the name of Pro Star Management Tasbi.

== Honours ==
- PSLB Cup
  - Champion (1): 2009
- Pengcab PSSI Medan Gold Cup
  - Champion (1): 2010
- Danpomal Lantamal Cup
  - Champion (1): 2011
- Pomad Cup
  - Champion (1): 2011
- Klumpang Putra Cup
  - Champion (1): 2012
- Liga Indonesia Third Division (North Sumatra zone)
  - Champions (2): 2012, 2013
- Liga Indonesia Third Division (Northern Sumatra region)
  - Champion (1): 2013
  - Runner-up (1): 2012
- Mencirim Putra Cup
  - Champion (1): 2013

== Official management ==
- Founder(s): Badiaraja Manurung, Jhon Ismadi Lubis, Bangga Gultom, M. Fadli Nasution
- Chairman: Ricky Fahreza Syafi'i
- Club advisory: Yopie Batubara, Chairulsyah Siregar, Riche Farida Pohan, Arifin Arsyad, Yogaswara

=== Board ===
- Head office: Teguh Iman Gedidha
- CEO: Zulkifli
- Secretary: Fazril Matondang, Yoserizal
  - Deputy secretary: Heru Riyanto
- Treasurer: Asrul Batubara, Herwan Hanafia
  - Deputy treasurer: Sutan P. Siregar, Sulaiman Rolas
- Public relations: Fachari Candra, Rachamatullah, Yose Rizal
- Media: Septianda P.
- Legal: Didit Aditya
- Equipment and transport: Yono, Ismail H., Enda
- Medical: Tri Adi Milano
- Finance: Ikhfana Syafina
- IT: Jefri Bule Limbong, Arisi Muhammad
- Arbitration: Tanjung, Ariadi

=== Staff ===
- Manager: Asrul Batubara
- Assistant manager: Heru Riyanto
- Head coach: M. Rizal Dosin
- Assistant coach: Fandi Prima, Syarifuddin, Taufik Hidayat, Iwan
- Goalkeeper coach: Syahril Nasution, Agus Supardi
- Technical advisory: M. Khaidir, Listiadi
