= Wawan Widiantoro =

Indonesian footballer

Wawan
Personal information
- Full name: Wawan Widiantoro
- Date of birth: 20 January 1977 (age 49)
- Place of birth: Kediri, Indonesia
- Height: 1.70 m (5 ft 7 in)
- Positions: Left back; left winger

Senior career*
Years	Team	Apps	(Gls)
1996–1998	Arema	43	(2)
1999–2000	Persik Kediri	32	(0)
2001–2002	Arema Malang	16	(0)
2003–2004	Persik Kediri	28	(0)
2004–2005	PKT Bontang	13	(0)
2006–2011	Persik Kediri	52	(7)
2011–2012	PSMS Medan	32	(2)
2013–2014	Perseta Tulungagung	24	(4)
2015–2016	PSS Sleman	31	(3)
2023	Inter Pemuda Kediri	1	(0)
Total		272	(18)
- * Club domestic league appearances and goals

Wawan Widiantoro (born 20 January 1977) is an Indonesian former footballer.

In 2005, he sparked controversy when he reportedly signed for 3 clubs at the same time, namely Persik Kediri, PKT Bontang and Persikabo. It ended with the clubs (PKT and Persikabo) had their down payment for the contract refunded and Wawan banned from competitions for 2 seasons.

After retiring in 2016, he started business in property and came out of retirement in 2023 to play for Inter Pemuda Kediri, coached by his former teammate at Persik, Harianto. He is the oldest active player in official Indonesian football competition at 46 years old.

== Club statistics ==
Club	Season	Super League		Premier Division		Piala Indonesia		Total	
Club	Season	Apps	Goals	Apps	Goals	Apps	Goals	Apps	Goals
Persik Kediri	2009-10	24	2	-		5	1	29	3
PSMS Medan	2011-12	27	0	-		-		27	0
Total		51	2	-		5	1	56	3

== Honours ==
Persik Kediri

- Liga Indonesia Premier Division: 2003, 2006
