= Usep Munandar =

Indonesian footballer

Usep
Personal information
- Full name: Usep Munandar
- Date of birth: 17 December 1981 (age 44)
- Place of birth: Bandung, Indonesia
- Height: 1.78 m (5 ft 10 in)
- Position: Defender

Senior career*
Years	Team	Apps	(Gls)
2002−2003	Barito Putera		
2004−2006	Persib Bandung		
2007−2008	PSMS Medan	28	(1)
2008−2009	Persik Kediri	31	(0)
2009−2011	Persisam Putra	35	(1)
2011−2012	Persiba Balikpapan	3	(0)
2012–2013	PSS Sleman		
2013	Persekap Pasuruan		
2014−2015	Borneo	26	(0)
2017	Kalteng Putra	8	(0)

International career
2002−2003	Indonesia U23		
2008	Indonesia	2	(0)
- * Club domestic league appearances and goals

Usep Munandar (born 17 December 1981, in Bandung) is an Indonesian former professional footballer who played as a defender.

== Honors ==
PSMS Medan

- Liga Indonesia Premier Division runner up: 2007–08
