= Igor Radusinović =

Montenegrin footballer

Personal information
- Date of birth: 15 March 1984 (age 42)
- Place of birth: Titograd, SFR Yugoslavia
- Height: 1.84 m (6 ft 0 in)
- Position: Defender

Senior career*
Years	Team	Apps	(Gls)
2000−2001	Budućnost Podgorica	0	(0)
2001−2004	Kom Podgorica		
2003	→ Crvena Stijena (loan)		
2004	→ Ribnica (loan)		
2005	Hajduk Kula	0	(0)
2005−2007	Vllaznia Shkodër	43	(0)
2007−2008	Bokelj	31	(1)
2008−2011	Grbalj	79	(1)
2011−2012	Rudar Pljevlja	22	(1)
2012−2013	Grbalj	44	(2)
2014	Hibernians	10	(0)
2014	Mladost Podgorica	16	(0)
2015	Barito Putera	3	(0)
2015−2016	Mladost Podgorica	9	(0)
- * Club domestic league appearances and goals

Igor Radusinović (born 15 March 1984) is a Montenegrin former professional footballer who played as a midfielder.

== Career ==
Radusinović played with several Montenegrin clubs, and with Serbian side FK Hajduk Kula.

Radusinović was signed by Barito Putera on 20 December 2014. In 2015, he appeared in two matches for Barito Putera in the Indonesia Super League.
