= Fandy Mochtar =

Indonesian footballer

Personal information
- Full name: Fandy Mochtar
- Date of birth: 19 May 1984 (age 42)
- Place of birth: Ternate, Indonesia
- Height: 1.74 m (5 ft 9 in)
- Positions: Winger; full-back

Senior career*
Years	Team	Apps	(Gls)
2002–2004	Persiter Ternate	15	(0)
2004−2006	Persibom Bolaang Mongondow	20	(1)
2006–2008	Persiter Ternate	26	(4)
2008–2009	Arema Malang	33	(5)
2009–2012	Persisam Putra Samarinda	76	(5)
2012−2013	Sriwijaya	30	(2)
2013−2014	Persiba Balikpapan	25	(1)
2014–2015	Pusamania Borneo	10	(0)
Total		235	(18)

International career
2006–2007	Indonesia U23		
2007–2011	Indonesia	8	(0)
- * Club domestic league appearances and goals

Fandy Mochtar (born 19 May 1984) is an Indonesian former professional footballer.

== Club career ==
On 6 December 2014, he signed with Pusamania Borneo.

== International career ==
He made his debut for Indonesia on 9 November 2007 against Syria as substitute. He has won eight caps for the Indonesia national football team.

== Honours ==
Sriwijaya

- Indonesian Inter Island Cup: 2012
