= Jaya Teguh Angga =

Indonesian footballer

Personal information
- Full name: Jaya Teguh Angga Warsito
- Date of birth: 14 August 1987 (age 39)
- Place of birth: Malang, Indonesia
- Height: 1.78 m (5 ft 10 in)
- Position: Striker

Youth career
- Persema Malang

Senior career*
Years	Team	Apps	(Gls)
2007–2011	Persema Malang	56	(29)
2011–2013	Arema Cronus F.C.	31	(3)
2014–2016	Pusamania Borneo F.C.	29	(7)
2017–2019	PSBI Blitar	27	(11)
Total		143	(50)

International career
2010	Indonesia	1	(0)
- * Club domestic league appearances and goals

Jaya Teguh Angga Warsito (born 14 August 1987) is an Indonesian former footballer who currently plays as a striker and also former member of Indonesia national team.

== Honours ==
Persema Malang

- Liga Indonesia Premier Division runner up: 2008–09
