= Galih Sudaryono =

Indonesian association footballer

Personal information
- Full name: Galih Sudaryono
- Date of birth: 4 January 1987 (age 39)
- Place of birth: Semarang, Indonesia
- Height: 1.78 m (5 ft 10 in)
- Position: Goalkeeper

Senior career*
| Years | Team | Apps | (Gls) |
| 2005–2006 | Persiba Bantul | | |
| 2007–2008 | PSS Sleman | 9 | (0) |
| 2008–2009 | PSMS Medan | 23 | (0) |
| 2009–2010 | Pro Duta | 13 | (0) |
| 2010–2011 | Persiba Balikpapan | 9 | (0) |
| 2011–2013 | Persija Jakarta | 32 | (0) |
| 2014 | Persiram Raja Ampat | 6 | (0) |
| 2015–2016 | Borneo | 2 | (0) |
| 2017 | Kalteng Putra | 14 | (0) |
| 2018 | Persis Solo | 22 | (0) |
| 2019 | Sriwijaya | 24 | (0) |
| 2020 | Persijap Jepara | 0 | (0) |
| Total | | 154 | (0) |

International career
| 2004–2005 | Indonesia U19 | | |
| 2006–2009 | Indonesia U23 | | |
- * Club domestic league appearances and goals as of 10:25, 14 November 2019 (UTC)

Galih Sudaryono (born 4 January 1987) is an Indonesian former footballer who plays as a goalkeeper.

== Club career ==
=== Borneo ===
On 23 December 2014, he signed with Pusamania Borneo.

=== kalteng Putra ===
He was signed for Kalteng Putra to play in Liga 2 in the 2017 season.

=== Persis Solo ===
In 2018, Galih signed a contract with Indonesian Liga 2 club Persis Solo.

=== Sriwijaya ===
He was signed for Sriwijaya to play in Liga 2 in the 2019 season.

=== Persijap Jepara ===
In 2020, Galih signed a contract with Indonesian Liga 2 club Persijap Jepara.
