= Fiktor Pae =

Indonesian footballer (born 1986)

Personal information
- Full name: Fiktor Pae
- Date of birth: 7 February 1986 (age 40)
- Place of birth: Jayapura, Indonesia
- Height: 1.72 m (5 ft 8 in)
- Position: Left-back

Youth career
- 2001–2008: Cendrawasih Muda Manokwari

Senior career*
Years	Team	Apps	(Gls)
2008–2010	Perseman Manokwari	6	(0)
2010–2011	Persidafon Dafonsoro	23	(0)
2011–2013	Persipura Jayapura	16	(0)
2014	Persija Jakarta	12	(3)
2015	Borneo	0	(0)
2016	Persela Lamongan	23	(2)
2017	PSPS Pekanbaru	13	(2)
2018	Persipura Jayapura	0	(0)
2018	Persiraja Banda Aceh	19	(0)
2019–2020	Persewar Waropen	19	(0)
2021	PSPS Riau	4	(0)
2022–2024	Persewar Waropen	28	(6)
2025–2026	Persipal Palu	22	(0)
- * Club domestic league appearances and goals as of 23 February 2026

Fiktor Pae (born 7 February 1986 in Jayapura) is an Indonesian professional footballer who plays as a left-back.

== Personal life ==
His older brother, Yustinus Pae, is also a professional footballer who plays for Persipura Jayapura.

== Honours ==
=== Club ===
Persipura Jayapura

- Indonesia Super League: 2013
