= Rodrigo Santoni =

Argentine footballer

Personal information
- Full name: Rodrigo Santoni
- Date of birth: 19 October 1981 (age 45)
- Place of birth: Argentina
- Height: 1.76 m (5 ft 9 1/2 in)
- Positions: Striker; winger

Senior career*
| Years | Team | Apps | (Gls) |
| 2007–2010 | Persikabo Bogor | 77 | (22) |
| 2010–2011 | PSIS Semarang | 14 | (4) |
| 2011–2012 | Persikab Bandung | 15 | (5) |
| 2012–2013 | Arema FC | 12 | (0) |
| Total | | 118 | (31) |
- * Club domestic league appearances and goals

Rodrigo Santoni (born 19 October 1981) is an Argentine former footballer.
