= Donny Fernando Siregar =

Indonesian footballer

Donny Siregar
Personal information
- Full name: Donny Fernando Siregar
- Date of birth: September 24, 1982 (age 44)
- Place of birth: Balige, Toba, Indonesia
- Height: 1.70 m (5 ft 7 in)
- Position: Midfielder

Senior career*
Years	Team	Apps	(Gls)
2008−2010	Persijap Jepara		
2010−2012	Persiba Balikpapan		
2012−2014	Pro Duta FC		
2014−2016	Gresik United		
2016−2018	PSMS Medan		
- * Club domestic league appearances and goals as of 00:18, 9 September 2016 (UTC)

Donny Fernando Siregar or Donny Siregar (born September 24, 1982) is an Indonesian former footballer.

== Club career ==
He previously played for Persijap Jepara and Persiba Balikpapan. In December 2014, he signed with Gresik United. In 2016, he signed with his hometown team PSMS Medan.
