= Fauzi Toldo =

Indonesian footballer (born 1981)

Personal information
- Full name: Fauzi Toldo
- Date of birth: 22 November 1981 (age 44)
- Place of birth: Palembang, Indonesia
- Height: 1.80 m (5 ft 11 in)
- Position: Goalkeeper

Senior career*
Years	Team	Apps	(Gls)
2004–2008	Persik Kediri	117	(0)
2008–2009	Persiba Bantul	24	(0)
2009–2013	Putra Samarinda	80	(0)
2013–2014	Sriwijaya	18	(0)
2015–2016	PSM Makassar	0	(0)
2016–2017	Persik Kediri	18	(0)
Total		257	(0)
- * Club domestic league appearances and goals

Fauzi Toldo (born 22 November 1981) is an Indonesian former footballer who played as a goalkeeper.

== Career ==
=== Sriwijaya F.C. ===
He moved from Putra Samarinda to Sriwijaya on 17 October 2013.
