= Osvaldo Moreno =

Paraguayan footballer (born 1981)

Personal information
- Date of birth: 4 June 1981 (age 45)
- Place of birth: Paraguay
- Height: 1.78 m (5 ft 10 in)
- Position: Forward

Senior career*
Years	Team	Apps	(Gls)
2002–2003	Persib Bandung	27	(10)
2004–2005	PSM Makassar	28	(8)
2006	Santiago Wanderers	15	(4)
2007–2008	Persmin Minahasa	28	(7)
2008–2009	Pegaso Real de Colima	35	(11)
2010	PSM Makassar	30	(8)
2010–2011	Club Aurora	22	(6)
2011–2013	3 de Febrero	26	(8)
- * Club domestic league appearances and goals

Osvaldo Moreno (born 4 June 1981) is a Paraguayan former professional footballer who plays as a forward.
