= Yusuf Effendi =

Indonesian association footballer

Personal information
- Full name: Yusuf Effendi
- Date of birth: 5 June 1988 (age 38)
- Place of birth: Banyuwangi, Indonesia
- Height: 1.69 m (5 ft 7 in)
- Positions: Winger; attacking midfielder

Senior career*
Years	Team	Apps	(Gls)
2012–2014	Pro Duta	26	(8)
2015–2017	Gresik United	50	(6)
2018	Madura	23	(7)
2019–2024	Persiba Balikpapan	42	(4)
2024–2025	Persewangi Banyuwangi	14	(10)

Managerial career
- 2026–: Persewangi Banyuwangi (assistant)
- * Club domestic league appearances and goals as of 23:31, 5 May 2025 (UTC)

Yusuf Effendi (born 5 June 1988) is an Indonesian former footballer who plays as a winger.

== Career statistics ==
=== Club ===
As of 5 May 2025

Club performance			League		National Cup		League Cup		Continental		Total	
Season	Club	League	Apps	Goals	Apps	Goals	Apps	Goals	Apps	Goals	Apps	Goals
2015	Gresik United	Indonesia Super League	3	2	-		-		-		3	2
2016	Gresik United	Indonesia Soccer Championship	24	2	-		-		-		24	2
2017	Gresik United	Liga 1	23	2	-		-		-		23	2
Total			50	6	-		-		-		50	6
2018	Madura	Liga 2	23	7	-		-		-		23	7
Total			23	7	-		-		-		23	7
2019	Persiba Balikpapan	Liga 2	15	2	-		-		-		15	2
2020	Persiba Balikpapan	Liga 2	1	1	-		-		-		1	1
2021	Persiba Balikpapan	Liga 2	11	1	-		-		-		11	1
2022–23	Persiba Balikpapan	Liga 2	4	0	-		-		-		4	0
2023–24	Persiba Balikpapan	Liga 2	10	0	-		-		-		10	0
Total			42	4	-		-		-		42	4
2024–25	Persewangi Banyuwangi	Liga 4	14	10	-		-		-		14	10
Total			14	10	-		-		-		14	10
Career total			129	27	-		-		-		129	27

== Honours ==
=== Club ===
Pro Duta

- Indonesian Premier League: 2013
