= Djayusman Triasdi =

Indonesian footballer

Personal information
- Full name: Djayusman Triasdi
- Date of birth: 22 August 1988 (age 38)
- Place of birth: Makassar, Indonesia
- Height: 1.82 m (5 ft 11 1/2 in)
- Position: Defender

Youth career
- PS Bangau Putra
- 2005–2006: PSM Makassar

Senior career*
Years	Team	Apps	(Gls)
2006–2009	PSM Makassar	36	(0)
2009–2010	Persebaya Surabaya	22	(0)
2010–2011	PSM Makassar	12	(1)
2011–2012	Putra Samarinda	26	(0)
2012–2013	Persela Lamongan	18	(0)
2013–2014	PSM Makassar	25	(0)
2014–2016	Pusamania Borneo	19	(0)
2016–2017	Persela Lamongan	14	(0)
2017	PS Mojokerto Putra	10	(0)
Total		182	(1)

International career
2007	Indonesia U-19	4	(0)
2008	Indonesia U-21		
2009–2011	Indonesia U-23	4	(0)
- * Club domestic league appearances and goals

Djayusman Triasdi (born 22 August 1988) is an Indonesian former footballer who plays as a defender.

== Club career ==
Triasdi began his senior career with PS Bangau Putra in 2003. He later played for several Indonesian clubs, including PSM Makassar, Persebaya Surabaya, Persisam Putra Samarinda, Borneo FC, and Persela Lamongan. He returned multiple times to PSM Makassar and spent the later part of his career with Persela.
