= Zulvin Zamrun =

Indonesian footballer

Personal information
- Full name: Zulvin Malik Zamrun
- Date of birth: 19 February 1988 (age 38)
- Place of birth: Ternate, Indonesia
- Height: 1.72 m (5 ft 8 in)
- Positions: Winger; full back

Youth career
- 2005: Persiter Ternate

Senior career*
Years	Team	Apps	(Gls)
2007–2011	Persiter Ternate	33	(8)
2011–2012	Persip Pekalongan	11	(0)
2012–2013	Persiba Balikpapan	12	(2)
2014–2015	Mitra Kukar	5	(1)
2015	Pusamania Borneo	2	(0)
2016	Persela Lamongan	9	(0)
2016	PSM Makassar	14	(0)
2017–2018	Borneo	5	(0)
2018	→ Kalteng Putra (Ioan)	5	(0)
2019	PSGC Ciamis	2	(0)
Total		98	(11)
- * Club domestic league appearances and goals

Zulvin Malik Zamrun (born 19 February 1988) is an Indonesian former footballer who plays as a Winger and Full Back.

== Personal life ==
He is the twin brother of Zulham Zamrun who is in the Indonesia national football team.

== Career ==
In January 2015, he signed with Pusamania Borneo.

== Honours ==
Borneo

- Indonesia President's Cup runner-up: 2017
