= Saktiawan Sinaga =

Indonesian footballer

Personal information
- Full name: Saktiawan Sinaga
- Date of birth: 19 February 1982 (age 44)
- Place of birth: Medan, Indonesia
- Height: 1.78 m (5 ft 10 in)
- Position: Forward

Team information
- Current team: Tiga Naga (Head Coach)

Youth career
- 1997−1998: SSB Generasi
- 1999: SSB Sejati Pratama
- 2000: PSMS Medan

Senior career*
Years	Team	Apps	(Gls)
2000−2002	PSPS Pekanbaru	40	(6)
2002–2004	PSDS Deli Serdang	18	(5)
2004−2008	PSMS Medan	100	(30)
2008−2010	Persik Kediri	26	(9)
2010−2011	Semen Padang	28	(6)
2011−2012	Mitra Kukar	20	(4)
2012−2013	Perseru Serui	18	(6)
2013−2014	PSS Sleman	14	(5)
2014−2015	Pusamania Borneo	1	(0)
2018	Persiwa Wamena	3	(0)
2018	Celebest	0	(0)
2019−2020	Tiga Naga	11	(4)
2021−2022	Medan Utama	5	(0)
Total		284	(75)

International career
2003−2005	Indonesia U23	5	(1)
2004−2009	Indonesia	9	(2)

Managerial career
- 2023−: Tiga Naga
Medal record
Men's football
Representing Indonesia
AFF Championship
Runner-up	2004 Vietnam & Malaysia	Team
- * Club domestic league appearances and goals

Saktiawan Sinaga (born 19 February 1982 in Medan, North Sumatra) is an Indonesian former footballer who plays as a forward who currently head coach of Tiga Naga.

== Personal life ==
His parents are Sudin Sinaga (father) and Sulastri (mother). He has 2 children with his wife Nadila Soraya Lubis, they are Sheva Nazua Sinaga (4 years) and Deryl Syuza (5 months). Normally, people call him Sakti or Wawan.

== Club career ==
On 5 May 2009, when playing with Persik Kediri against Persija Jakarta, suddenly he fell unconscious and stretched to the edge of the pitch. After remaining unconscious for 2 minutes, he was carried to Narrow Hospital, RSUD Gambiran.

He was diagnosed with heart disease, high cholesterol, and exhaustion from playing Persik Kediri against Deltras Sidoarjo on 1 May 2009. In December 2014, he was reported to have joined Perseru Serui.

On January 20, 2015, he signed with Pusamania and was assigned the number 20.

== International career ==
His debut on the Senior Team was at the Tiger Cup 2004. Saktiawan Sinaga scored the first goal for Indonesia in the 2007 AFF Championship tournament against Laos.

=== International goals ===
No.	Date	Venue	Opponent	Score	Result	Competition
1.	13 January 2007	National Stadium, Kallang, Singapore	Laos	2–1	3–1	2007 AFF Championship
2.	15 January 2007	National Stadium, Kallang, Singapore	Vietnam	1–1	1–1	2007 AFF Championship

== Honours ==
PSMS Medan

- Bang Yos Gold Cup: 2004, 2005, 2006
- Liga Indonesia Premier Division runner up: 2007–08

Indonesia

- AFF Championship runner-up: 2004
