= 1989 in association football =

This is a list of the football (soccer) events of the year 1989 throughout the world.

== Events ==
- March 3 – Portugal wins its first FIFA World Youth Championship
- April 15 – Hillsborough disaster, that occurred at Hillsborough, before the FA Cup Semi-Final between Liverpool & Nottingham Forest.
- May 20 – Liverpool wins the FA Cup, beating Everton 3–2 AET, thanks to two goals from Ian Rush.
- May 24 – A.C. Milan defeats Steaua București, 4–0, to win their third European Cup final.
- May 26 – Arsenal beat Liverpool F.C. 2–0 at Anfield to dramatically win the English Football League First Division, thanks to an injury time goal from Michael Thomas.
- May 31 – Copa Libertadores is won by Atlético Nacional after defeating Olimpia Asunción 5–4 on penalties after a final aggregate score of 2–2.
- June 24 – In the final of the FIFA U-16 World Championship, Saudi Arabia became surprising winners during the penalty shoot-out to Scotland in Glasgow.
- December 17 – Italy's Milan wins the Intercontinental Cup in Tokyo, Japan by defeating Colombia's Atlético Nacional in extra-time 1–0. The only goal is scored by Alberigo Evani.

== Winners club national championships ==
=== Africa ===
Country	Team
Algeria	JE Tizi-Ouzou
Angola	Petro Atlético
Benin	Dragons de l'Ouémé
Botswana	Botswana Defence Force XI
Burkina Faso	Association Sportive du Faso-Yennenga
Burundi	Inter Bujumbura
Cameroon	Racing Bafoussam
Cape Verde	Académica Mindelo
Central African Republic	SCAF Tocages
Chad	Renaissance
Congo	Étoile du Congo
Djibouti	tournament not held
Egypt	Al-Ahly
Equatorial Guinea	Elá Nguema
Ethiopia	Mechal Army
Gabon	Sogara
Gambia	tournament unfinished
Ghana	Asante Kotoko
Guinea	Horoya
Guinea-Bissau	Sport Bissau e Benfica
Ivory Coast	Africa Sports National
Kenya	AFC Leopards
Lesotho	Arsenal Maseru
Liberia	Mighty Barolle
Libya	Al-Ittihad
Madagascar	Sotema
Malawi	Tigers
Mali	Stade Malien
Mauritania	tournament not held
Mauritius	Sunrise Flacq United
Morocco	FAR Rabat
Mozambique	Clube Ferroviário de Maputo
Namibia	Black Africa
Niger	Olympic FC de Niamey
Nigeria	Iwuanyanwu Nationale
Poland	Ruch Chorzów
Réunion	Saint-Pierroise
Rwanda	Mukungwa
São Tomé and Príncipe	Vitória Riboque
Senegal	ASC Diaraf
Seychelles	Saint-Louis
Sierra Leone	Freetown United
Somalia	Mogadiscio Municipality
Sudan	Al-Hilal Omdurman
Swaziland	Denver Sundowns
Tanzania	Malindi
Togo	ASKO Kara
Tunisia	Espérance Sportive de Tunis
Uganda	Nakivubo Villa
Zaire	Daring Club Motema Pembe
Zambia	Nkana
Zimbabwe	Dynamos

=== Asia ===
Country	League	Team	League details
Bahrain	Bahraini Premier League	Bahrain	1988–89
Cambodia	Cambodian League	Ministry of Transports	1989
China	Jia-A	China B	1989
Hong Kong	Hong Kong First Division League	Happy Valley	1988–89
Iraq	Iraq Super League	Al-Rasheed	1988–89
Japan	Japan Soccer League	Nissan Motors	1988–89
Jordan	Jordan League	Al-Faisaly	1989
North Korea	DPR Korea League	Ch'ŏngjin Chandongcha	1989
South Korea	K-League	Yukong Elephants	1989
Kuwait	Kuwaiti Premier League	Al Arabi Kuwait	1988–89
Lebanon	Lebanese Premier League	Al-Ansar	1989
Macau	Campeonato da 1ª Divisão do Futebol	Hap Kuan	1989
Malaysia	Malaysia Super League	Selangor FA	
Maldives	Maldives National Championship	Club Lagoons	1989
Mongolia	Mongolia Premier League	Khudulmur	1989
Nepal	A-Division League	Manang Marsyangdi Club	1989
Oman	Omani League	Al-Nasr	1988–89
Pakistan	Pakistan National Championship	PIA	1989
Qatar	Qatar Stars League	Al-Sadd	1988–89
Saudi Arabia	Saudi Professional League	Al-Nasr	1988–89
Singapore	FAS Premier League	Geylang International	1989
Sri Lanka	Kit Premier League	Saunders	1989
Syria	Syrian Premier League	Jableh	1988–89
Chinese Taipei	National Football League	Taipei City Bank F.C.	1989
UAE	UAE Football League	Sharjah	1988–89
Vietnam	V-League	Đồng Tháp F.C.	1989
North Yemen	Yemeni League	Al Yarmuk Al Rawda	1988–89
South Yemen	Al-Wahda Aden	South Yemeni League	1988–89

=== Europe ===
Country	League	Team	League details	National details
Albania	Albanian Superliga	17 Nëntori Tirana	1988–89	
Austria	Austrian Football Bundesliga	Swarovski Tirol	1988–89	
Belgium	Belgian First Division	Mechelen	1988–89	
Bulgaria	Bulgarian A Professional Football Group	CSKA Sofia	1988–89	
Cyprus	Cypriot First Division	Omonia	1988–89	
Czechoslovakia	Czechoslovak First League	Sparta Prague	1988–89	
Denmark	Danish 1st Division	OB	1989	
England	Football League First Division	Arsenal	1988–89	1988–89
Faroe Islands	1. deild	B71 Sandoy	1989	
Finland	Mestaruussarja	Kuusysi	1989	
France	Division 1	Marseille	1988–89	
East Germany	DDR-Oberliga	Dynamo Dresden	1988–89	
West Germany	Bundesliga	Bayern Munich	1988–89	
Greece	Alpha Ethniki	AEK Athens	1988–89	
Hungary	Hungarian National Championship I	Budapest Honvéd	1988–89	
Iceland	Úrvalsdeild	Knattspyrnufélag Akureyrar	1989	
Israel	Liga Leumit	Maccabi Haifa	1988–89	
Italy	Serie A	Inter Milan	1988–89	
Luxembourg	Luxembourg National Division	Spora Luxembourg	1988–89	
Malta	Maltese Premier League	Sliema Wanderers	1988–89	
Netherlands	Eredivisie	PSV	1988–89	
Northern Ireland	Irish League	Linfield	1988–89	
Norway	1. divisjon	Lillestrøm	1989	
Poland	Ekstraklasa	Ruch Chorzów	1988–89	
Portugal	Portuguese Liga	Benfica	1988–89	
Republic of Ireland	League of Ireland	Derry City	1988–89	
Romania	Divizia A	Steaua București	1988–89	
San Marino	Campionato Sammarinese di Calcio	Domagnano	1988–89	
Scotland	Scottish Premier Division	Rangers		1988–89
Soviet Union	Soviet Top League	Spartak Moscow	1989	
Spain	La Liga	Real Madrid	1988–89	
Sweden	Allsvenskan	IFK Norrköping	1989	1989
Switzerland	Swiss Super League	Lucerne	1988–89	
Turkey	First Football League	Fenerbahçe	1988–89	
Yugoslavia	Yugoslav First League	Vojvodina	1988–89	

=== North America ===
Country	League	Team	League details
Antigua and Barbuda	Premier Division	SAP	1988–89
Aruba	Aruban Division di Honor	Estrella	1989
Barbados	Premier Division	Paradise	1989
Bermuda	Bermudian Premier Division	Pembroke Hamilton Club	1988–89
British Virgin Islands	Tortola League	Popeye Bombers	1989
Canada	Canadian Soccer League	Vancouver 86ers	1989
Costa Rica	Primera División de Costa Rica	Deportivo Saprissa	1989
Cuba	Campeonato Nacional de Fútbol de Cuba	Pinar del Río	1988–89
Dominica	Dominica Championship	Harlem United	1989
El Salvador	Primera División de Fútbol Profesional	Luis Ángel Firpo	1988–89
French Guiana	Championnat National	ASC Le Geldar	1988–89
Guadeloupe	Division d'Honneur	Zénith	1989
Guatemala	Liga Nacional de Fútbol de Guatemala	Municipal	1988–89
Haiti	Division 1 Ligue Haïtienne	FICA	1988–89
Honduras	Liga Nacional de Fútbol de Honduras	Real España	1988–89
Jamaica	Jamaica National Premier League	Boys' Town	1988–89
Martinique	Martinique Championnat National	Excelsior (Schoelcher)	1988–89
Mexico	Primera División	América	1988–89
Netherlands Antilles	Kopa Antiano	Union Deportivo Banda Abou	1989
Nicaragua	Primera División de Nicaragua	Diriangén	1989
Panama	ANAPROF	Tauro	1989
Saint Kitts	Saint Kitts Premier Division	Newton United	1989
Suriname	Surinamese League	Robinhood	1989
Trinidad and Tobago	TT Pro League	Defence Force	1989
United States	American Soccer League	Fort Lauderdale Strikers	1989
United States	Western Soccer Alliance	San Diego Nomads	1989
United States	National Pro Soccer Championship	Fort Lauderdale Strikers	1989

=== Oceania ===
Country	League	Team	League details
Australia	National Soccer League	Marconi Fairfield	1989
Fiji	National Club Championship	Combine Stars SC	1989
New Zealand	New Zealand National Soccer League	Napier City Rovers	1989
Tahiti	Tahiti Division Fédérale	AS Pirae	1989

=== South America ===
Country	League	Team	League details	National details
Argentina	Primera División Argentina	Independiente	1988–89	1988–89
Bolivia	Liga de Fútbol Profesional Boliviano	The Strongest	1989	
Brazil	Campeonato Brasileiro Série A	Vasco da Gama	1989	1989
Chile	Primera División de Chile	Colo-Colo	1989	
Colombia	Colombian Professional Football	tournament cancelled	1989	
Ecuador	Serie A de Ecuador	Barcelona Sporting Club	1989	
Paraguay	Primera División de Paraguay	Olimpia Asunción	1989	
Peru	Primera División Peruana	Unión Huaral	1989	
Uruguay	Primera División Uruguaya	C.A. Progreso	1989	
Venezuela	Primera División Venezolana	Atlético Club Mineros de Guayana	1988–89	

== International Tournaments ==
- Copa América in Brazil (July 1–16, 1989)
  1. Brazil
  2. Uruguay
  3. Argentina

== Births ==
=== January ===
- January 3: Gerardo Mendoza, Venezuelan footballer (d. 2019)
- January 6: Jasmin Pllana, Austrian club footballer
- January 7:
  - Emiliano Insúa (Argentinian defender)
  - Miles Addison (English defender)
  - Khairul Fahmi Che Mat, Malaysian footballer
- January 10: Yance Youwei, Indonesian former footballer
- January 14:
  - Adam Clayton (English youth international)
  - Mattia Marchi (Italian club footballer)
  - Liu Xiaodong (Chinese footballer)
- January 20:
  - Jens Bodemer, German former footballer
  - Nikola Ivanović, Serbian footballer
  - Washington Santana da Silva, Brazilian club footballer
- January 25: Edgar Urquizo, Mexican football manager and former player
- January 29: Dirceu (Brazilian footballer)
- January 30: Tomás Mejías (Spanish youth international)

=== February ===
- February 1: Oleksandr Protsyuk (Ukrainian footballer)
- February 4: Toni Huuhka (Finnish former footballer and current coach)
- February 14: Jocenir "Jocenir Alves da Silva" (Brazilian footballer)
- February 21: Luca Borrelli (Italian professional footballer)
- February 28: Sofian Akouili (Dutch-Morocco professional footballer)

=== March ===
- March 1: Carlos Vela (Mexican forward)
- March 13: Marko Marin (German international midfielder)
- March 15: Ondřej Mazuch (Czech defender)
- March 16: Theo Walcott (English international forward)
- March 17: Surafiel Tesfamicael (Eritrean footballer)
- March 19: Jonathan Reguero, Spanish footballer
- March 29: Arnold Peralta Honduran international footballer (died 2015)
- March 31
  - Pablo Piatti (Argentinian forward)

=== April ===
- April 3: Eder Peti, Albanian footballer
- April 8: Éric Batinga, Cameroonian footballer
- April 13: Dario Dussin, Swiss professional footballer
- April 22: Jasper Cillessen, Dutch international goalkeeper

=== May ===
- May 6: Chukwuma Akabueze (Nigerian midfielder)
- May 11: Giovani dos Santos (Mexican forward)
- May 30: Giannis Litsis, (Greek professional footballer)
- May 31:
  - Bas Dost (Dutch footballer)
  - Marco Reus (German footballer)

=== June ===
- June 2: Freddy Adu (American forward)
- June 8: Joseph Steward Leopold (Mauritian footballer)
- June 18: Pierre-Emerick Aubameyang (Gabonese striker)
- June 19: Abdelaziz Barrada (Moroccan midfielder) (d. 2024)
- June 20: Javier Pastore (Argentine footballer)
- June 25: Jack Cork (English footballer)

=== July ===
- July 3: Matías Banco (Argentine midfield footballer)
- July 9: Ángel Conde (Mexican professional footballer)
- July 16: Gareth Bale (Welsh international forward)
- July 23: Sigrun Kristiansen (Faroese footballer)

=== August ===
- August 3: Nick Viergever (Dutch defender)
- August 9: Igor Kuljanac (Slovenian footballer)
- August 10: Ben Sahar (Israeli forward)
- August 12: Vladimir Castellón (Bolivian forward)
- August 17: David Abdul (Dutch Antillean forward)
- August 29: Levy Mokgothu (retired South African professional footballer)

=== September ===
- September 1:
  - Henrika Gustytė, Lithuanian former footballer
  - Jefferson Montero, Ecuadorian international
  - Daniel Sturridge (English forward)
- September 2: Alexandre Pato (Brazilian forward)
- September 10: Victory Yendra (Indonesian former footballer)
- September 11: Steven Ehricks, American retired footballer
- September 13:
  - Paul Camps (German footballer)
  - Sebastián Regueiro (Uruguayan footballer)
- September 21: Ben Mee (English defender)
- September 25: Krisztián Brunczvik (Slovak footballer, midfielder)

=== October ===
- October 2: Donald Solomon, Caymanian footballer
- October 3:
  - Natalia Saratovtseva, former Russian footballer
  - Zachari Zeegelaar, Surinamese football assistant referee
- October 4: Benjamin Stebbings, English cricketer
- October 6: Albert Ebossé Bodjongo, Cameroonian international footballer (died 2014)
- October 15: Joan Darome, Indonesian former footballer
- October 19: Dawid Dynarek, Polish footballer
- October 20: Omar Yabroudi, Emirati football recruitment head
- October 24:
  - Armin Bačinović, Slovenian midfielder
  - Jack Colback, English footballer
  - Nyron Dyer, Montserratian international footballer
  - Cristian Gamboa, Costa Rican international
  - Ontse Ntesa, Motswana international footballer
  - Igor Pisanjuk, Serbian footballer

=== November ===
- November 5:
  - Andrew Boyce, English club footballer
  - Brandon Mabiala, French footballer
- November 6: Josmer Altidore (American forward)
- November 17:
  - Nick Salapatas, British-Greek footballer
- November 22: José Carlos Prieto, Chilean footballer

=== December ===
- December 3: Kristjan Lipovac, Slovenian footballer
- December 9: Niklas Hartmann, German footballer
- December 17: André Ayew, Ghanaian footballer
- December 19: David Gbemie, Liberian former professional footballer
- December 22: Daniel Goldschmitt, German footballer
- December 28: Mark Sekyere, Ghanaian footballer

== Deaths ==
=== February ===
- February 5 – André Cheuva (80), French footballer

=== April ===
- April 24 – Franz Binder (77), Austrian footballer

=== May ===
- May 19 – Samuel Okwaraji, (25) Nigerian footballer, squad Nigeria national football team at the 1988 Summer Olympics

=== July ===
- July 20 – José Augusto Brandão, Brazilian midfielder, semi-finalist at the 1938 FIFA World Cup. (79)

=== September ===
- September 1 – Kazimierz Deyna (41), Polish footballer

=== November ===
- November 9 – Leen Vente (78), Dutch footballer
