= 2010–11 PSPS Pekanbaru season =

Indonesian football club season

PSPS Pekanbaru
2010-11 season
- Indonesian Super League: 11th

The 2010–11 season was PSPS Pekanbaru's second consecutive year in the top flight of Indonesian football.

== Players ==
=== Appearances and goals ===
Last updated on 27 September.

No.	Pos	Nat	Player	Total		Indonesian Super League		Piala Indonesia	
No.	Pos	Nat	Player	Apps	Goals	Apps	Goals	Apps	Goals
3	MF	(Indonesia) IDN	April Hadi	1	1	1	1	0	0
4	DF	(Cameroon) CMR	Banaken Bossoken Arman Joel	1	0	1	0	0	0
5	DF	(Indonesia) IDN	Agus Cima	1	0	1	0	0	0
7	MF	(South Korea) KOR	Shin Hyun-Joon	1	0	1	0	0	0
8	FW	(Indonesia) IDN	Putut Waringin Jati	1	0	1	0	0	0
9	FW	(Cameroon) CMR	Dzumafo Epandi Herman	1	1	1	1	0	0
10	MF	(Cameroon) CMR	Patrice Nzekou Nguenheu	1	0	1	0	0	0
13	GK	(Indonesia) IDN	Fance Haryanto	1	0	1	0	0	0
15	DF	(Indonesia) IDN	Danil Junaidi	1	0	1	0	0	0
16	DF	(Indonesia) IDN	Windhu Hanggoro Putra	0	0	0	0	0	0
18	MF	(Indonesia) IDN	M Zahrul Azhar	1	0	1	0	0	0
21	MF	(Indonesia) IDN	Rusdianto	1	0	1	0	0	0
23	GK	(Indonesia) IDN	Dede Sulaiman	1	0	1	0	0	0
27	DF	(Indonesia) IDN	Dedy Gusmawan	1	0	1	0	0	0
28	MF	(Indonesia) IDN	Sulaiman Alamsyah Nasution	1	0	1	0	0	0
77	MF	(Indonesia) IDN	Edi Sukamto	0	0	0	0	0	0
88	FW	(Indonesia) IDN	M Isnaini	0	0	0	0	0	0
	FW	(Indonesia) IDN	Victory Yendra	0	0	0	0	0	0
	MF	(Indonesia) IDN	Septia Hadi	0	0	0	0	0	0

==== Top scorers ====
Includes all competitive matches. The list is sorted by shirt number when total goals are equal.

Last updated on 27 September

Position	Nation	Number	Name	Indonesian Super League	Piala Indonesia	Total
1	(Indonesia)	3	April Hadi	1	0	1
2	(Cameroon)	9	Dzumafo Epandi Herman	1	0	1
TOTALS				2	0	2
