= 2014 Persija Jakarta season =

Persija Jakarta
2014 season
- Chairman: Ferry Paulus
- Head coach: Benny Dollo
- Stadium: Gelora Bung Karno Stadium
- Indonesia Super League: First Round (5th in West Group)
- Top goalscorer: League: Ramdani Lestaluhu (8 goals); All: Ramdani Lestaluhu (8 goals)
- Highest home attendance: 66,143 vs Persib (10 August 2014)
- Lowest home attendance: 14,341 vs Gresik United (29 April 2014)
- Average home league attendance: 25,895
Home colours	Away colours	Third colours

The 2014 season is Persija's 81st competitive season. Persija was finished in fifth but they didn't enter to second round. In this season, Ramdani Lestaluhu was showing his great potential with 8 goals.

== Season overview ==
In the 2014 season, Persija are in the western group of ISL 2014 and coached by Benny Dollo and Fabiano Beltrame is the team captain. Persija doesn't have a striker who is quite satisfactory despite being filled by Ivan Bošnjak who had played for Croatia in World Cup 2006.

== Squad information ==
=== First team squad ===
No.	Name	Nat.	Signed in	Date of birth (age)	Signed from
Goalkeepers
26	Andritany Ardhiyasa	(Indonesia)	2010	26 December 1991 (age 34)	(Indonesia) Sriwijaya FC
29	Adixi Lenzivio	(Indonesia)	2013	29 September 1992 (age 33)	(Indonesia) Persija Jakarta U-21
35	Daryono	(Indonesia)	2013	5 June 1994 (age 31)	(Indonesia) Persija Jakarta U-21
Defenders
3	Dany Saputra	(Indonesia)	2013	1 January 1991 (age 35)	(Indonesia) PSMP
13	Firmansyah	(Indonesia)	2014	29 January 1995 (age 31)	(Indonesia) Persija Jakarta U-21
14	Ismed Sofyan	(Indonesia)	2003	28 August 1979 (age 46)	(Indonesia) Persijatim
15	Fabiano Beltrame	(Brazil)	2011	29 August 1982 (age 43)	(Indonesia) Persela Lamongan
22	Feri Komul	(Indonesia)	2012	1 March 1987 (age 38)	(Indonesia) PSAP Sigli
23	Victor Pae	(Indonesia)	2014	7 February 1986 (age 39)	(Indonesia) Persipura Jayapura
33	Syahrizal	(Indonesia)	2013	2 October 1993 (age 32)	(Indonesia) Persija Jakarta U-21
99	April Hadi	(Indonesia)	2014	10 April 1981 (age 44)	(Indonesia) Mitra Kukar
Midfielders
7	Ramdani Lestaluhu	(Indonesia)	2014	5 November 1991 (age 34)	(Indonesia) Sriwijaya FC
8	Egi Melgiansyah	(Indonesia)	2013	4 September 1990 (age 35)	(Indonesia) Arema FC
9	Rudi Setiawan	(Indonesia)	2011	13 January 1993 (age 33)	(Indonesia) Persija Jakarta U-21
17	Defri Rizky	(Indonesia)	2013	10 December 1988 (age 37)	(Indonesia) Persiraja Banda Aceh
21	Amarzukih	(Indonesia)	2010	21 June 1984 (age 41)	(Indonesia) Persitara Jakarta Utara
24	Richard Dwaramury	(Indonesia)	2014	16 March 1994 (age 31)	(Indonesia) Persija Jakarta U-21
29	Ngurah Nanak	(Indonesia)	2010	29 July 1988 (age 37)	(Indonesia) Sriwijaya FC
32	Rohit Chand	(Nepal)	2013	1 March 1992 (age 33)	(Indonesia) PSPS Pekanbaru
Forwards
10	Ivan Bošnjak	(Croatia)	2013	6 February 1979 (age 46)	(Brunei) DPMM FC
11	Rahmat Affandi	(Indonesia)	2011	5 April 1984 (age 41)	(Indonesia) Persib Bandung
18	Agus Salim	(Indonesia)	2014	17 August 1986 (age 39)	(Indonesia) Persipasi Bekasi
19	Agung Supriyanto	(Indonesia)	2014	14 June 1992 (age 33)	(Indonesia) Persijap Jepara
25	Boakay Eddie Foday	(Liberia)	2014	19 August 1986 (age 39)	(Indonesia) Persipura Jayapura
77	Abduh Lestaluhu	(Indonesia)	2013	16 October 1993 (age 32)	(Indonesia) Persis Solo

== Pre-season ==
Win Draw Loss

=== Inter Island Cup ===
==== Java Group 2 ====
Pos	Team	Pld	W	D	L	GF	GA	GD	Pts	Qualification
1	Arema Cronous	3	3	0	0	7	1	+6	9	2014 Inter Island Cup
2	Persela Lamongan	3	1	1	1	3	3	0	4	
3	Persija Jakarta	3	0	2	1	2	4	−2	2	
4	Persepam Madura United	3	0	1	2	2	6	−4	1	

through to quarter final

==== Matches ====
10 January 2014 GS 1	Persija	1 - 1	Persela	Malang, Indonesia
19:00	Costas 83(p)'	Report	Addison 60'	Stadium: Kanjuruhan Stadium; Attendance: 1,376

11 January 2014 GS 2	Persepam	1 - 1	Persija	Malang, Indonesia
15:30	Escobar 71'	Report	Costas 59(p)'	Stadium: Kanjuruhan Stadium; Attendance: 1,036

13 January 2014 GS 3	Arema FC	2 - 0	Persija	Malang, Indonesia
19:00	Beto 32', 60'	Report		Stadium: Kanjuruhan Stadium; Attendance: 24,387

== Competitions ==
=== Overview ===
Competition	Record								Started round	Final position / round	First match	Last match
Competition	G	W	D	L	GF	GA	GD	Win %	Started round	Final position / round	First match	Last match
Indonesia Super League	20	9	7	4	27	15	+12	45.00	—	5th	1 February 2014	5 September 2014
Total	20	9	7	4	27	15	+12	45.00				

Updated to match played 6 September 2014
Source: Competitions

==== League table ====
Pos	Team	Pld	W	D	L	GF	GA	GD	Pts	Qualification or relegation
3	Semen Padang	20	11	5	4	30	17	+13	38	Advance to second round
4	Pelita Bandung Raya	20	10	5	5	30	21	+9	35	Advance to second round
5	Persija	20	9	7	4	27	15	+12	34	
6	Sriwijaya	20	6	5	9	22	29	−7	23	
7	Barito Putera	20	6	4	10	23	31	−8	22	

Updated to match(es) played on 5 September 2014. Source: ISL table, Source
Rules for classification: 1) points; 2) head-to-head points; 3) head-to-head goal difference; 4) head-to-head goals scored; 5) goal difference; 6) number of goals scored.

== Matches ==
=== Indonesia Super League ===
1 February 2014 1	Barito	1 - 2	Persija	Banjarmasin, Indonesia
19:00	Lomell 9(p)'	Report	Rohit 4' Ramdani 83'	Stadium: Demang; Attendance: 9,853

8 February 2014 2	Persija	2 - 0	Semen Padang	Jakarta, Indonesia
19:0	Affandi 59' Ivan 75(p)'	Report		Stadium: Gelora Bung Karno Stadium; Attendance: 23,479

17 February 3014 3	Pelita Bandung Raya	2 - 2	Persija	Bandung, Indonesia
15:30	Bambang 39', 66'	Report	Ivan 72' Hadi 81'	Stadium: Si Jalak Harupat Stadium; Attendance: 1,000

9 March 2014 4	Persija	1 - 1	Sriwijaya FC	Jakarta, Indonesia
15:30	Affandi 90'	Report	Kone 80'	Stadium: Gelora Bung Karno Stadium; Attendance: 21,587

12 March 2014 5	Persija	1 - 0	Persita	Jakarta, Indonesia
19:00	Ramdani 45'	Report		Stadium: Gelora Bung Karno Stadium; Attendance: 15,754

16 April 2014 6	Persijap	0 - 2	Persija	Jepara, Indonesia
15:00		Report	Supriyanto 35' Ramdani 56'	Stadium: Gelora Bumi Kartini Stadium; Attendance: 3,068

21 April 2014 7	Persik	2 - 1	Persija	Kediri, Indonesia
15:30	Ndubuisi 32' Cahya 47'	Report	Fabiano 45+'	Stadium: Brawijaya Stadium; Attendance: 8,438

29 April 2014 8	Persija	1 - 0	Gresik United	Jakarta, Indonesia
19:00	V. Pae 66'	Report		Stadium: Gelora Bung Karno Stadium; Attendance: 14,341

4 May 2014 9	Persija	0 - 1	Arema FC	Jakarta, Indonesia
19:00		Report	Gustavo 82(p)'	Stadium: Gelora Bung Karno Stadium; Attendance: 39,880

8 May 2014 10	Persib	0 - 0	Persija	Bandung, Indonesia
15:30		Report		Stadium: Si Jalak Harupat Stadium; Attendance: 26,978

18 May 2014 11	Arema FC	1 - 0	Persija	Malang, Indonesia
19:00	Sunarto 82'	Report		Stadium: Kanjuruhan Stadium; Attendance: 33,277

22 May 2014 12	Gresik United	1 - 1	Persija	Gresik, Indonesia
	Reza 35'	Report	Ramdani 67'	Stadium: Tri Dharma Stadium; Attendance: 11,300

26 May 2014 13	Persija	4 - 1	Persijap	Jakarta, Indonesia
19:00	Pae 21', 74' Ivan 32' Foday 70(p)'	Report	Sciucatti 57'	Stadium: Gelora Bung Karno Stadium; Attendance: 16,189

30 May 2014 14	Persija	1 - 0	Persik	Jakarta, Indonesia
19:15	Ramdani 13'	Report		Stadium: Gelora Bung Karno Stadium; Attendance: 18,968

8 June 2014 15	Sriwijaya FC	3 - 1	Persija Jakarta	Palembang, Indonesia
19:00	Kone 18', 30' Nabar 64'	Report	Ramdani 57'	Stadium: Gelora Sriwijaya Stadium

12 June 2014 16	Persita	0 - 4	Persija	Bantul, Indonesia
15:30		Report	Ramdani 4', 22' Bošnjak 35' Foday 58'	Stadium: Sultan Agung Stadium; Attendance: 2,100

10 August 2014 17	Persija	0 - 0	Persib	Jakarta, Indonesia
15:30		Report		Stadium: Gelora Bung Karno Stadium; Attendance: 66,143

14 August 2014 18	Persija	1 - 1	PBR	Jakarta, Indonesia
19:00	Ponaryo 90(p)'	Report	Bambang 66'	Stadium: Gelora Bung Karno Stadium; Attendance: 19,837

21 August 2014 19	Semen Padang	0 - 0	Persija	Padang, Indonesia
19:00		Report		Stadium: Haji Agus Salim Stadium; Attendance: 9,238

5 September 2014 20	Persija	3 - 1	Barito Putera	Jakarta, Indonesia
19:00	Ngurah Nanak 17' Fabiano 9', 77'	Report	Hartono 37'	Stadium: Gelora Bung Karno Stadium; Attendance: 22,774

== See also ==
- 2014 Indonesia Super League
