= Stebbings =

Stebbings is a surname. Notable people with the surname include:

- Benjamin Stebbings (born 1989), British cricketer
- Paul Stebbings, British actor and theatre director
- Peter Stebbings (born 1971), Canadian actor, director, producer, and screenwriter

== See also ==
- Stebbing (disambiguation)
