= Urquizo =

Urquizo is a surname. Notable people with the surname include:

- Edgar Urquizo (born 1989), Mexican footballer
- Francisco Luis Urquizo (1891–1969), Mexican soldier
- José Antonio Urquizo (born 1967), Peruvian politician
- Luis Francisco Urquizo Cuesta (born 1950), Ecuadorian poet
