= Ndubuisi =

- Pronunciation: /nduːbiːsiː/
- Gender: Male
- Language: Igbo

Origin
- Origin: Nigeria
- Meaning: Life is paramount
- Region of origin: Igboland

Ndubuisi // (sometimes spelled Ndubisi) is a common male given name and surname of Igbo origin. Combining the elements ndu + bụ + isi, it literally means "life is paramount".

== People named Ndubuisi ==
=== Given name ===
- Mikel Ndubusi Agu (born 1993), Nigerian footballer
- Ndubuisi Egbo (born 1973), Nigerian football manager and former footballer
- Ndubuisi Ekekwe (born 1975), Nigerian professor, inventor, engineer, author and entrepreneur
- Ndubuisi Eze (born 1984), Nigerian footballer
- Dario Ndubuisi Gebuhr (born 2003), German footballer
- Ndubuisi Kanu (1943–2021), Nigerian military governor
  - Ndubuisi Kanu Park, a public park in Ikeja, Lagos, Nigeria
- Ndubuisi Obi, Nigerian Anglican prelate
- Chukwuemeka Ndubuisi "Emeka" Okafor (born 1982), American basketball player
- Ndubuisi Okosieme (born 1966), Nigerian footballer
- Michael Ndubuisi Onwatuegwu (born 1987), Nigerian footballer
- Ndubuisi "Dele" Udo (1957–1981), Nigerian sprinter
- Josaiah Ndubuisi Wachuku (?–1950), king, paramount chief, servant leader and Eze of Ngwa-land, Nigeria

=== Surname ===
- Haggai Ndubuisi (born 2000), Nigerian gridiron football player
- Nina Chioma Ndubuisi (born 2004), German shot putter
- Robinson Ndubuisi, Nigerian football manager

== People named Ndubisi ==
- Ndubisi Chukunyere (born 1979), Nigerian footballer
- Emmanuel Ndubisi Maduagwu (born 1947), Nigerian biochemist and academic
- Brian Ndubisi Orakpo (born 1986), American football player

== See also ==
- Kostas Entoumpouisi Antetokounmpo (born 1997), Nigerian-Greek basketball player
