= 1988–89 Football League =

90th season of the Football League

The Football League
- Season: 1988–89
- Champions: Arsenal
- Relegated: Darlington
- New club in League: Lincoln City

The 1988–89 season was the 90th completed season of the Football League.

No European qualification took place due to the Heysel Stadium disaster suspension in place.

Prior to the 1986–87 season membership of the Football League was dependent on a system of election by the other member teams. From 1986 that system came to an end, and instead, the club finishing last in the Fourth Division was automatically demoted to Conference. This season the casualty was Darlington.

== First Division ==
First Division
- Season: 1988–89
- Champions: Arsenal; 9th English title
- Relegated: Middlesbrough; West Ham United; Newcastle United
- Matches: 380
- Goals: 962 (2.53 per match)
- Top goalscorer: Alan Smith (23 goals)
- Biggest home win: Luton Town 6–1 Southampton (2 January 1989)
- Biggest away win: Millwall 0–5 Tottenham Hotspur (29 April 1989)
- Highest scoring: Coventry City 3–4 Middlesbrough (1 October 1988); Luton Town 6–1 Southampton (2 January 1989); Queens Park Rangers 4–3 Wimbledon (8 April 1989); Middlesbrough 3–4 Nottingham Forest (22 April 1989); Luton Town 5–2 Charlton Athletic (2 May 1989)
- Longest winning run: 9 matches Liverpool
- Longest unbeaten run: 18 matches Liverpool
- Longest losing run: 5 matches Southampton

A fiercely-contested title race went right to the wire, with the title-deciding game featuring both contenders not being played until 26 May – six days after the FA Cup final – as the league season was extended following the Hillsborough disaster on 15 April, in which 97 Liverpool fans died. Liverpool went on to lift the trophy in the second all-Merseyside FA Cup final in four seasons, and a strong second half of the season had taken them to the top of the league; they needed only a draw at home to second-placed Arsenal to clinch the title. The Gunners, on the other hand, needed to win by at least two clear goals to beat the Merseysiders to the title, and that was exactly what they did. A late goal from Michael Thomas ended Arsenal's 18-year wait to be champions of England again, the only time the English league has been decided by goals scored.

There were no shortage of rivals for the title throughout the season. Millwall, in the First Division for the first time, frequently topped the table during the season's early stages and were consistently in the top five until well after Christmas, and still managed to finish 10th despite not winning any of their final 10 games. Norwich City, who also reached the semi-finals of the FA Cup, were strong contenders for most of the season and finished fourth. Third placed Nottingham Forest, who won the League Cup and the Full Members' Cup (their first pieces of silverware since winning the European Cup in 1980) had a mediocre first half of the season before finding their form after Christmas, although they never looked like serious title contenders. Their East Midlands rivals Derby County were on the fringes of the title race for much of the season, and their fifth-place finish was their highest for well over a decade.

Three teams who were among the pre-season title favourites failed to make an impact in the title race. Everton could only manage an eighth-place finish, their lowest final position since 1982, although they did well in the cup competitions, finishing runners-up in the FA Cup and Full Members Cup. Tottenham, who had spent millions in the transfer market since Terry Venables became manager, were bottom of the table in late October but enjoyed an upturn in form during the second half of the season to secure sixth place in the final table. Manchester United continued to rebuild under Alex Ferguson, but a failure to convert draws into victories during the first half of the season and a run of bad results during the season's final stages dragged them down to 11th place in the final table; a good run of form after Christmas had projected them into the fringes of the title race, but their season ultimately collapsed after an FA Cup quarter-final exit.

The loss of Paul Gascoigne to Tottenham in the first £2 million deal between English clubs gave Newcastle manager Willie McFaul a chance to spend heavily in the transfer market, but his signings failed to gel and he was sacked in October with the Tynesiders bottom of the First Division. His successor Jim Smith was unable to keep Newcastle up, and they went down in bottom place, while Smith's old club QPR finished a steady ninth under new player-manager Trevor Francis. John Lyall's 15-year spell as West Ham manager came to an end after relegation and the decision of the board not to renew his contract. The final relegation place went to Middlesbrough, who had enjoyed good form for a newly promoted side (and one which had been virtually bankrupt and in the Third Division in 1986) until a late slump dropped them back into the Second Division. Aston Villa narrowly avoided the drop after a similar downturn in performances during the season's final stages.

| Pos | Team | Pld | W | D | L | GF | GA | GD | Pts | Qualification or relegation |
|---|---|---|---|---|---|---|---|---|---|---|
| 1 | Arsenal (C) | 38 | 22 | 10 | 6 | 73 | 36 | +37 | 76 | Disqualified from the European Cup |
| 2 | Liverpool (Note: Liverpool would have qualified as FA Cup winners.) | 38 | 22 | 10 | 6 | 65 | 28 | +37 | 76 | Disqualified from the European Cup Winners' Cup |
| 3 | Nottingham Forest (Note: Nottingham Forest would have qualified as League Cup winners.) | 38 | 17 | 13 | 8 | 64 | 43 | +21 | 64 | Disqualified from the UEFA Cup |
| 4 | Norwich City | 38 | 17 | 11 | 10 | 48 | 45 | +3 | 62 | Disqualified from the UEFA Cup |
| 5 | Derby County | 38 | 17 | 7 | 14 | 40 | 38 | +2 | 58 | |
| 6 | Tottenham Hotspur | 38 | 15 | 12 | 11 | 60 | 46 | +14 | 57 | |
| 7 | Coventry City | 38 | 14 | 13 | 11 | 47 | 42 | +5 | 55 | |
| 8 | Everton | 38 | 14 | 12 | 12 | 50 | 45 | +5 | 54 | |
| 9 | Queens Park Rangers | 38 | 14 | 11 | 13 | 43 | 37 | +6 | 53 | |
| 10 | Millwall | 38 | 14 | 11 | 13 | 47 | 52 | −5 | 53 | |
| 11 | Manchester United | 38 | 13 | 12 | 13 | 45 | 35 | +10 | 51 | |
| 12 | Wimbledon | 38 | 14 | 9 | 15 | 50 | 46 | +4 | 51 | |
| 13 | Southampton | 38 | 10 | 15 | 13 | 52 | 66 | −14 | 45 | |
| 14 | Charlton Athletic | 38 | 10 | 12 | 16 | 44 | 58 | −14 | 42 | |
| 15 | Sheffield Wednesday | 38 | 10 | 12 | 16 | 34 | 51 | −17 | 42 | |
| 16 | Luton Town | 38 | 10 | 11 | 17 | 42 | 52 | −10 | 41 | |
| 17 | Aston Villa | 38 | 9 | 13 | 16 | 45 | 56 | −11 | 40 | |
| 18 | Middlesbrough (R) | 38 | 9 | 12 | 17 | 44 | 61 | −17 | 39 | Relegation to the Second Division |
| 19 | West Ham United (R) | 38 | 10 | 8 | 20 | 37 | 62 | −25 | 38 | Relegation to the Second Division |
| 20 | Newcastle United (R) | 38 | 7 | 10 | 21 | 32 | 63 | −31 | 31 | Relegation to the Second Division |

Source: World Football
Rules for classification: 1) Points; 2) Goal difference; 3) Goals scored
(C) Champions; (R) Relegated

=== First Division results ===
| Home \ Away | ARS | AST | CHA | COV | DER | EVE | LIV | LUT | MUN | MID | MIL | NEW | NWC | NOT | QPR | SHW | SOU | TOT | WHU | WDN |
|---|---|---|---|---|---|---|---|---|---|---|---|---|---|---|---|---|---|---|---|---|
| Arsenal | | 2–3 | 2–2 | 2–0 | 1–2 | 2–0 | 1–1 | 2–0 | 2–1 | 3–0 | 0–0 | 1–0 | 5–0 | 1–3 | 2–1 | 1–1 | 2–2 | 2–0 | 2–1 | 2–2 |
| Aston Villa | 0–3 | | 1–2 | 1–1 | 1–2 | 2–0 | 1–1 | 2–1 | 0–0 | 1–1 | 2–2 | 3–1 | 3–1 | 1–1 | 2–1 | 2–0 | 1–2 | 2–1 | 0–1 | 0–1 |
| Charlton Athletic | 2–3 | 2–2 | | 0–0 | 3–0 | 1–2 | 0–3 | 3–0 | 1–0 | 2–0 | 0–3 | 2–2 | 1–2 | 0–1 | 1–1 | 2–1 | 2–2 | 2–2 | 0–0 | 1–0 |
| Coventry City | 1–0 | 2–1 | 3–0 | | 0–2 | 0–1 | 1–3 | 1–0 | 1–0 | 3–4 | 0–0 | 1–2 | 2–1 | 2–2 | 0–3 | 5–0 | 2–1 | 1–1 | 1–1 | 2–1 |
| Derby County | 2–1 | 2–1 | 0–0 | 1–0 | | 3–2 | 0–1 | 0–1 | 2–2 | 1–0 | 0–1 | 2–0 | 0–1 | 0–2 | 0–1 | 1–0 | 3–1 | 1–1 | 1–2 | 4–1 |
| Everton | 1–3 | 1–1 | 3–2 | 3–1 | 1–0 | | 0–0 | 0–2 | 1–1 | 2–1 | 1–1 | 4–0 | 1–1 | 1–1 | 4–1 | 1–0 | 4–1 | 1–0 | 3–1 | 1–1 |
| Liverpool | 0–2 | 1–0 | 2–0 | 0–0 | 1–0 | 1–1 | | 5–0 | 1–0 | 3–0 | 1–1 | 1–2 | 0–1 | 1–0 | 2–0 | 5–1 | 2–0 | 1–1 | 5–1 | 1–1 |
| Luton Town | 1–1 | 1–1 | 5–2 | 2–2 | 3–0 | 1–0 | 1–0 | | 0–2 | 1–0 | 1–2 | 0–0 | 1–0 | 2–3 | 0–0 | 0–1 | 6–1 | 1–3 | 4–1 | 2–2 |
| Manchester United | 1–1 | 1–1 | 3–0 | 0–1 | 0–2 | 1–2 | 3–1 | 2–0 | | 1–0 | 3–0 | 2–0 | 1–2 | 2–0 | 0–0 | 1–1 | 2–2 | 1–0 | 2–0 | 1–0 |
| Middlesbrough | 0–1 | 3–3 | 0–0 | 1–1 | 0–1 | 3–3 | 0–4 | 2–1 | 1–0 | | 4–2 | 1–1 | 2–3 | 3–4 | 1–0 | 0–1 | 3–3 | 2–2 | 1–0 | 1–0 |
| Millwall | 1–2 | 2–0 | 1–0 | 1–0 | 1–0 | 2–1 | 1–2 | 3–1 | 0–0 | 2–0 | | 4–0 | 2–3 | 2–2 | 3–2 | 1–0 | 1–1 | 0–5 | 0–1 | 0–1 |
| Newcastle United | 0–1 | 1–2 | 0–2 | 0–3 | 0–1 | 2–0 | 2–2 | 0–0 | 0–0 | 3–0 | 1–1 | | 0–2 | 0–1 | 1–2 | 1–3 | 3–3 | 2–2 | 1–2 | 2–1 |
| Norwich City | 0–0 | 2–2 | 1–3 | 1–2 | 1–0 | 1–0 | 0–1 | 2–2 | 2–1 | 0–0 | 2–2 | 0–2 | | 2–1 | 1–0 | 1–1 | 1–1 | 3–1 | 2–1 | 1–0 |
| Nottingham Forest | 1–4 | 4–0 | 4–0 | 0–0 | 1–1 | 2–0 | 2–1 | 0–0 | 2–0 | 2–2 | 4–1 | 1–1 | 2–0 | | 0–0 | 1–1 | 3–0 | 1–2 | 1–2 | 0–1 |
| Queens Park Rangers | 0–0 | 1–0 | 1–0 | 2–1 | 0–1 | 0–0 | 0–1 | 1–1 | 3–2 | 0–0 | 1–2 | 3–0 | 1–1 | 1–2 | | 2–0 | 0–1 | 1–0 | 2–1 | 4–3 |
| Sheffield Wednesday | 2–1 | 1–0 | 3–1 | 1–2 | 1–1 | 1–1 | 2–2 | 1–0 | 0–2 | 1–0 | 3–0 | 1–2 | 2–2 | 0–3 | 0–2 | | 1–1 | 0–2 | 0–2 | 1–1 |
| Southampton | 1–3 | 3–1 | 2–0 | 2–2 | 0–0 | 1–1 | 1–3 | 2–1 | 2–1 | 1–3 | 2–2 | 1–0 | 0–0 | 1–1 | 1–4 | 1–2 | | 0–2 | 4–0 | 0–0 |
| Tottenham Hotspur | 2–3 | 2–0 | 1–1 | 1–1 | 1–3 | 2–1 | 1–2 | 0–0 | 2–2 | 3–2 | 2–0 | 2–0 | 2–1 | 1–2 | 2–2 | 0–0 | 1–2 | | 3–0 | 3–2 |
| West Ham United | 1–4 | 2–2 | 1–3 | 1–1 | 1–1 | 0–1 | 0–2 | 1–0 | 1–3 | 1–2 | 3–0 | 2–0 | 0–2 | 3–3 | 0–0 | 0–0 | 1–2 | 0–2 | | 1–2 |
| Wimbledon | 1–5 | 1–0 | 1–1 | 0–1 | 4–0 | 2–1 | 1–2 | 4–0 | 1–1 | 1–1 | 1–0 | 4–0 | 0–2 | 4–1 | 1–0 | 1–0 | 2–1 | 1–2 | 0–1 | |

Legend: Blue = home team win; Yellow = draw; Red = away team win.

=== Managerial changes ===
| Team | Outgoing manager | Manner of departure | Date of vacancy | Position in table | Incoming manager | Date of appointment |
|---|---|---|---|---|---|---|
| Newcastle United | (Northern Ireland) Willie McFaul | Sacked | 10 October 1988 | 19th | (England) Colin Suggett (caretaker) | 10 October 1988 |
| Sheffield Wednesday | (England) Howard Wilkinson | Signed by Leeds United | 12 October 1988 | 9th | (England) Peter Eustace | 12 October 1988 |
| Newcastle United | (England) Colin Suggett | End of caretaker spell | 14 December 1988 | 20th | (England) Jim Smith | 14 December 1988 |
| Queens Park Rangers | (England) Jim Smith | Signed by Newcastle United | 14 December 1988 | 13th | (England) Trevor Francis | 14 December 1988 |
| Sheffield Wednesday | (England) Peter Eustace | Sacked | 14 February 1989 | 18th | (England) Ron Atkinson | 14 February 1989 |

=== First Division maps ===
Locations of the Football League First Division 1988–1989 teams
Locations of the Football League First Division London teams 1988–1989

== Second Division ==
Second Division
- Season: 1988–89
- Champions: Chelsea
- Promoted: Chelsea; Manchester City; Crystal Palace
- Relegated: Shrewsbury Town; Birmingham City; Walsall
- Matches: 552
- Goals: 1,465 (2.65 per match)
- Top goalscorer: Keith Edwards (26 goals)
- Biggest home win: West Bromwich Albion 6–0 Stoke City (18 December 1988)
- Biggest away win: Walsall 0–7 Chelsea (4 February 1989)
- Highest scoring: Blackburn Rovers 5–4 Crystal Palace (8 October 1988)
- Longest winning run: 7 matches
- Longest unbeaten run: 23 matches
- Longest losing run: 32 matches

Chelsea sealed an instant return to the First Division by sealing the Second Division title and gaining 99 points – the highest total in the club's history. Runners-up Manchester City, with a promising young side including Andy Hinchcliffe, David White and Paul Lake, returned to the elite after two seasons away as runners-up. Steve Coppell's rejuvenation of Crystal Palace finally paid off and five seasons and two near misses with promotion when they triumphed over Blackburn Rovers in the two-legged playoff final and overturned a two-goal deficit in the first leg which had looked to have ended the Lancashire side's 23-year absence from the First Division. Defeat in the semi-finals prevented an instant return to the First Division for Watford, while the other beaten semi-finalists Swindon narrowly missed out on matching the four-season rise from the Fourth Division to the First achieved earlier in the decade by Swansea and Wimbledon.

Despite the loss of manager Ron Atkinson to Atletico Madrid in October, West Bromwich Albion remained in the thick of the promotion race under new player-manager Brian Talbot and looked all set for promotion as late as February when they occupied second place, but a slump in form pushed them down to ninth place – not enough for even a place in the playoffs.

| Pos | Team | Pld | W | D | L | GF | GA | GD | Pts | Qualification or relegation |
|---|---|---|---|---|---|---|---|---|---|---|
| 1 | Chelsea (C, P) | 46 | 29 | 12 | 5 | 96 | 50 | +46 | 99 | Promotion to the First Division |
| 2 | Manchester City (P) | 46 | 23 | 13 | 10 | 77 | 53 | +24 | 82 | Promotion to the First Division |
| 3 | Crystal Palace (O, P) | 46 | 23 | 12 | 11 | 71 | 49 | +22 | 81 | Qualification for the Second Division play-offs |
| 4 | Watford | 46 | 22 | 12 | 12 | 74 | 48 | +26 | 78 | Qualification for the Second Division play-offs |
| 5 | Blackburn Rovers | 46 | 22 | 11 | 13 | 74 | 59 | +15 | 77 | Qualification for the Second Division play-offs |
| 6 | Swindon Town | 46 | 20 | 16 | 10 | 68 | 53 | +15 | 76 | Qualification for the Second Division play-offs |
| 7 | Barnsley | 46 | 20 | 14 | 12 | 66 | 58 | +8 | 74 | |
| 8 | Ipswich Town | 46 | 22 | 7 | 17 | 71 | 61 | +10 | 73 | |
| 9 | West Bromwich Albion | 46 | 18 | 18 | 10 | 65 | 41 | +24 | 72 | |
| 10 | Leeds United | 46 | 17 | 16 | 13 | 59 | 50 | +9 | 67 | |
| 11 | Sunderland | 46 | 16 | 15 | 15 | 60 | 60 | 0 | 63 | |
| 12 | Bournemouth | 46 | 18 | 8 | 20 | 53 | 62 | −9 | 62 | |
| 13 | Stoke City | 46 | 15 | 14 | 17 | 57 | 72 | −15 | 59 | |
| 14 | Bradford City | 46 | 13 | 17 | 16 | 52 | 59 | −7 | 56 | |
| 15 | Leicester City | 46 | 13 | 16 | 17 | 56 | 63 | −7 | 55 | |
| 16 | Oldham Athletic | 46 | 11 | 21 | 14 | 75 | 72 | +3 | 54 | |
| 17 | Oxford United | 46 | 14 | 12 | 20 | 62 | 70 | −8 | 54 | |
| 18 | Plymouth Argyle | 46 | 14 | 12 | 20 | 55 | 66 | −11 | 54 | |
| 19 | Brighton & Hove Albion | 46 | 14 | 9 | 23 | 57 | 66 | −9 | 51 | |
| 20 | Portsmouth | 46 | 13 | 12 | 21 | 53 | 62 | −9 | 51 | |
| 21 | Hull City | 46 | 11 | 14 | 21 | 52 | 68 | −16 | 47 | |
| 22 | Shrewsbury Town (R) | 46 | 8 | 18 | 20 | 40 | 67 | −27 | 42 | Relegation to the Third Division |
| 23 | Birmingham City (R) | 46 | 8 | 11 | 27 | 31 | 76 | −45 | 35 | Relegation to the Third Division |
| 24 | Walsall (R) | 46 | 5 | 16 | 25 | 41 | 80 | −39 | 31 | Relegation to the Third Division |

Source: thestatcat.co.uk
Rules for classification: 1) Points; 2) Goal difference; 3) Goals scored
(C) Champions; (O) Play-off winners; (P) Promoted; (R) Relegated

=== Second Division play-offs ===
Both the semifinals and the finals were decided over two legs.
The full results can be found at: Football League Division Two play-offs 1989.

Semi-finals; 1st leg –21 May; 2nd leg –24 May 1989
3rd | Crystal Palace | 0 | 2 | 2
6th | Swindon Town | 1 | 0 | 1
4th | Watford | 0 | 1 | 1
5th | Blackburn Rovers (Note: Blackburn won on away goals after extra time.) | 0 | 1 | 1

Finals; 1st leg –31 May; 2nd leg –3 June 1989
3rd | Crystal Palace | 1 | 3 | 4
5th | Blackburn Rovers | 3 | 0 | 3

=== Second Division results ===
| Home \ Away | BOU | BAR | BIR | BLB | BRA | B&HA | CHE | CRY | HUL | IPS | LEE | LEI | MCI | OLD | OXF | PLY | POR | SHR | STK | SUN | SWI | WAL | WAT | WBA |
|---|---|---|---|---|---|---|---|---|---|---|---|---|---|---|---|---|---|---|---|---|---|---|---|---|
| AFC Bournemouth | | 3–2 | 0–1 | 2–1 | 3–0 | 2–1 | 1–0 | 2–0 | 5–1 | 1–0 | 0–0 | 2–1 | 0–1 | 2–2 | 2–1 | 0–0 | 1–0 | 0–1 | 0–1 | 0–1 | 2–3 | 2–1 | 0–1 | 2–1 |
| Barnsley | 5–2 | | 0–0 | 0–1 | 0–0 | 2–2 | 1–1 | 1–1 | 0–2 | 2–0 | 2–2 | 3–0 | 1–2 | 4–3 | 1–0 | 3–1 | 1–0 | 1–0 | 1–0 | 3–0 | 1–1 | 1–0 | 2–2 | 2–1 |
| Birmingham City | 0–1 | 3–5 | | 2–0 | 1–0 | 1–2 | 1–4 | 0–1 | 1–0 | 1–0 | 0–0 | 2–3 | 0–2 | 0–0 | 0–0 | 0–1 | 0–0 | 1–2 | 0–1 | 3–2 | 1–2 | 1–0 | 2–3 | 1–4 |
| Blackburn Rovers | 2–0 | 2–1 | 3–0 | | 2–1 | 2–1 | 1–1 | 5–4 | 4–0 | 1–0 | 2–0 | 0–0 | 4–0 | 3–1 | 3–1 | 1–2 | 3–1 | 0–1 | 4–3 | 2–2 | 0–0 | 3–0 | 2–1 | 1–2 |
| Bradford City | 0–1 | 1–2 | 2–2 | 1–1 | | 0–1 | 2–2 | 0–1 | 1–1 | 2–2 | 1–1 | 2–1 | 1–1 | 2–0 | 0–0 | 1–1 | 2–1 | 1–0 | 0–0 | 1–0 | 2–2 | 3–1 | 2–1 | 2–0 |
| Brighton & Hove Albion | 1–2 | 0–1 | 4–0 | 3–0 | 1–3 | | 0–1 | 3–1 | 1–1 | 0–1 | 2–1 | 1–1 | 2–1 | 2–0 | 2–1 | 2–2 | 2–1 | 3–1 | 1–1 | 3–0 | 0–2 | 2–2 | 1–0 | 0–1 |
| Chelsea | 2–0 | 5–3 | 3–1 | 1–2 | 3–1 | 2–0 | | 1–0 | 2–1 | 3–0 | 1–0 | 2–1 | 1–3 | 2–2 | 1–1 | 5–0 | 3–3 | 2–0 | 2–1 | 1–1 | 3–2 | 2–0 | 2–2 | 1–1 |
| Crystal Palace | 2–3 | 1–1 | 4–1 | 2–2 | 2–0 | 2–1 | 1–1 | | 3–1 | 2–0 | 0–0 | 4–2 | 0–0 | 2–0 | 1–0 | 4–1 | 2–0 | 1–1 | 1–0 | 1–0 | 2–1 | 4–0 | 0–2 | 1–0 |
| Hull City | 4–0 | 0–0 | 1–1 | 1–3 | 1–1 | 5–2 | 3–0 | 0–1 | | 1–1 | 1–2 | 2–2 | 1–0 | 1–1 | 1–2 | 3–0 | 1–1 | 3–0 | 1–4 | 0–0 | 1–0 | 0–0 | 0–3 | 0–1 |
| Ipswich Town | 3–1 | 2–0 | 4–0 | 2–0 | 1–1 | 2–3 | 0–1 | 1–2 | 1–1 | | 0–1 | 2–0 | 1–0 | 2–1 | 1–2 | 2–2 | 0–1 | 2–0 | 5–1 | 2–0 | 1–2 | 3–1 | 3–2 | 2–1 |
| Leeds United | 3–0 | 2–0 | 1–0 | 2–0 | 3–3 | 1–0 | 0–2 | 1–2 | 2–1 | 2–4 | | 1–1 | 1–1 | 0–0 | 1–1 | 2–0 | 1–0 | 2–3 | 4–0 | 2–0 | 0–0 | 1–0 | 0–1 | 2–1 |
| Leicester City | 0–1 | 0–1 | 2–0 | 4–0 | 1–0 | 1–0 | 2–0 | 2–2 | 0–2 | 0–1 | 1–2 | | 0–0 | 1–2 | 1–0 | 1–0 | 2–1 | 1–1 | 2–0 | 3–1 | 3–3 | 1–0 | 2–2 | 1–1 |
| Manchester City | 3–3 | 1–2 | 0–0 | 1–0 | 4–0 | 2–1 | 2–3 | 1–1 | 4–1 | 4–0 | 0–0 | 4–2 | | 1–4 | 2–1 | 2–0 | 4–1 | 2–2 | 2–1 | 1–1 | 2–1 | 2–2 | 3–1 | 1–1 |
| Oldham Athletic | 2–0 | 1–1 | 4–0 | 1–1 | 1–1 | 2–1 | 1–4 | 2–3 | 2–2 | 4–0 | 2–2 | 1–1 | 0–1 | | 3–0 | 2–2 | 5–3 | 3–0 | 2–2 | 2–2 | 2–2 | 3–0 | 3–1 | 1–3 |
| Oxford United | 3–1 | 2–0 | 3–0 | 1–1 | 3–4 | 3–2 | 2–3 | 1–0 | 1–0 | 1–1 | 3–2 | 1–1 | 2–4 | 1–1 | | 0–1 | 1–0 | 4–1 | 3–2 | 2–4 | 1–1 | 1–0 | 0–4 | 1–1 |
| Plymouth Argyle | 1–1 | 1–2 | 0–1 | 4–3 | 3–1 | 3–0 | 0–1 | 0–2 | 2–0 | 0–1 | 1–0 | 1–1 | 0–1 | 3–0 | 3–1 | | 0–1 | 0–0 | 4–0 | 1–4 | 4–1 | 2–0 | 1–0 | 1–1 |
| Portsmouth | 2–1 | 3–0 | 1–0 | 1–2 | 1–2 | 2–0 | 2–3 | 1–1 | 1–3 | 0–1 | 4–0 | 3–0 | 0–1 | 1–1 | 2–1 | 2–0 | | 2–0 | 0–0 | 2–0 | 0–2 | 1–1 | 2–2 | 0–0 |
| Shrewsbury Town | 1–0 | 2–3 | 0–0 | 1–1 | 1–3 | 1–1 | 1–1 | 2–1 | 1–3 | 1–5 | 3–3 | 3–0 | 0–1 | 0–0 | 2–2 | 2–0 | 1–2 | | 1–2 | 0–0 | 0–1 | 0–0 | 1–1 | 1–1 |
| Stoke City | 2–1 | 1–1 | 1–0 | 0–1 | 2–1 | 2–2 | 0–3 | 2–1 | 4–0 | 1–1 | 2–3 | 2–2 | 3–1 | 0–0 | 1–0 | 2–2 | 2–2 | 0–0 | | 2–0 | 2–1 | 0–3 | 2–0 | 0–0 |
| Sunderland | 1–1 | 1–0 | 2–2 | 2–0 | 0–0 | 1–0 | 1–2 | 1–1 | 2–0 | 4–0 | 2–1 | 2–2 | 2–4 | 3–2 | 1–0 | 2–1 | 4–0 | 2–1 | 1–1 | | 4–0 | 0–3 | 1–1 | 1–1 |
| Swindon Town | 3–1 | 0–0 | 2–1 | 1–1 | 1–0 | 3–0 | 1–1 | 1–0 | 1–0 | 2–3 | 0–0 | 2–1 | 1–2 | 2–2 | 3–0 | 1–0 | 1–1 | 1–0 | 3–0 | 4–1 | | 1–0 | 1–1 | 0–0 |
| Walsall | 1–1 | 1–3 | 5–0 | 1–2 | 0–1 | 1–0 | 0–7 | 0–0 | 1–1 | 2–4 | 0–3 | 0–1 | 3–3 | 2–2 | 1–5 | 2–2 | 1–1 | 1–1 | 1–2 | 2–0 | 2–2 | | 0–1 | 0–0 |
| Watford | 1–0 | 4–0 | 1–0 | 2–2 | 2–0 | 1–1 | 1–2 | 0–1 | 2–0 | 3–2 | 1–1 | 2–1 | 1–0 | 3–1 | 1–1 | 3–0 | 1–0 | 0–0 | 3–2 | 0–1 | 2–3 | 5–0 | | 2–0 |
| West Bromwich Albion | 0–0 | 1–1 | 0–0 | 2–0 | 1–0 | 1–0 | 2–3 | 5–3 | 2–0 | 1–2 | 2–1 | 1–1 | 1–0 | 3–1 | 3–2 | 2–2 | 3–0 | 4–0 | 6–0 | 0–0 | 3–1 | 0–0 | 0–1 | |

Legend: Blue = home team win; Yellow = draw; Red = away team win.
- The match on March 27 1989 between Brighton & Hove Albion and Crystal Palace saw referee Kelvin Morton award a British record of five penalties in 27 minutes either side of half-time, with Palace earning three penalties in the space of just five minutes.Mark Bright scored and had his second kick saved by Brighton goalkeeper John Keeley. Ian Wright failed to score with the third penalty, hitting the post. Alan Curbishley scored a penalty for Brighton, followed by Palace player John Pemberton blasting his shot over the crossbar. Palace eventually won 2-1.

=== Second Division maps ===
Locations of the Football League Second Division London teams 1988–1989
Locations of the Football League Second Division 1988–1989 teams

== Third Division ==
Football LeagueThird Division
- Season: 1988–89
- Champions: Wolverhampton Wanderers (1st title)
- Promoted: Port Vale; Sheffield United
- Relegated: Aldershot; Chesterfield; Gillingham; Southend United
- Matches: 552
- Goals: 1,495 (2.71 per match)
- Top goalscorer: Steve Bull (Wolverhampton Wanderers), 37

Wolverhampton Wanderers, spearheaded by high-scoring striker Steve Bull, clinched a second successive promotion – again as champions – as they ran away with the Third Division title just 12 months after finishing champions of the Fourth Division. Bull, who broke the 50-goal barrier in all competitions for the second successive season, then became one of the few Third Division players to be selected for the senior England side when he was capped for his country for the first time. Sheffield United clinched the second promotion place a season after relegation – the fifth time in less than a decade that their manager Dave Bassett had managed a promotion-winning team, following his four promotions with Wimbledon. The final promotion place went to playoff winners Port Vale, who returned to the Second Division for the first time since 1957.

Aldershot's two-season stay in the Third Division ended with relegation in bottom place after a disastrous season. Gillingham, who had almost won promotion two years earlier, as did Chesterfield, and a Southend side whose 54 points was a greater tally than any other team to suffer relegation in Football League history.

| Pos | Team | Pld | W | D | L | GF | GA | GD | Pts | Promotion or relegation |
|---|---|---|---|---|---|---|---|---|---|---|
| 1 | Wolverhampton Wanderers (C, P) | 46 | 26 | 14 | 6 | 96 | 49 | +47 | 92 | Promotion to the Second Division |
| 2 | Sheffield United (P) | 46 | 25 | 9 | 12 | 93 | 54 | +39 | 84 | Promotion to the Second Division |
| 3 | Port Vale (O, P) | 46 | 24 | 12 | 10 | 78 | 48 | +30 | 84 | Qualification for the Third Division play-offs |
| 4 | Fulham | 46 | 22 | 9 | 15 | 69 | 67 | +2 | 75 | Qualification for the Third Division play-offs |
| 5 | Bristol Rovers | 46 | 19 | 17 | 10 | 67 | 51 | +16 | 74 | Qualification for the Third Division play-offs |
| 6 | Preston North End | 46 | 19 | 15 | 12 | 79 | 60 | +19 | 72 | Qualification for the Third Division play-offs |
| 7 | Brentford | 46 | 18 | 14 | 14 | 66 | 61 | +5 | 68 | |
| 8 | Chester City | 46 | 19 | 11 | 16 | 64 | 61 | +3 | 68 | |
| 9 | Notts County | 46 | 18 | 13 | 15 | 64 | 54 | +10 | 67 | |
| 10 | Bolton Wanderers | 46 | 16 | 16 | 14 | 58 | 54 | +4 | 64 | |
| 11 | Bristol City | 46 | 18 | 9 | 19 | 53 | 55 | −2 | 63 | |
| 12 | Swansea City | 46 | 15 | 16 | 15 | 51 | 53 | −2 | 61 | Qualification for the European Cup Winners' Cup first round |
| 13 | Bury | 46 | 16 | 13 | 17 | 55 | 67 | −12 | 61 | |
| 14 | Huddersfield Town | 46 | 17 | 9 | 20 | 63 | 73 | −10 | 60 | |
| 15 | Mansfield Town | 46 | 14 | 17 | 15 | 48 | 52 | −4 | 59 | |
| 16 | Cardiff City | 46 | 14 | 15 | 17 | 44 | 56 | −12 | 57 | |
| 17 | Wigan Athletic | 46 | 14 | 14 | 18 | 55 | 53 | +2 | 56 | |
| 18 | Reading | 46 | 15 | 11 | 20 | 68 | 72 | −4 | 56 | |
| 19 | Blackpool | 46 | 14 | 13 | 19 | 56 | 59 | −3 | 55 | |
| 20 | Northampton Town | 46 | 16 | 6 | 24 | 66 | 76 | −10 | 54 | |
| 21 | Southend United (R) | 46 | 13 | 15 | 18 | 56 | 75 | −19 | 54 | Relegation to the Fourth Division |
| 22 | Chesterfield (R) | 46 | 14 | 7 | 25 | 51 | 86 | −35 | 49 | Relegation to the Fourth Division |
| 23 | Gillingham (R) | 46 | 12 | 4 | 30 | 47 | 81 | −34 | 40 | Relegation to the Fourth Division |
| 24 | Aldershot (R) | 46 | 8 | 13 | 25 | 48 | 78 | −30 | 37 | Relegation to the Fourth Division |

(C) Champions; (O) Play-off winners; (P) Promoted; (R) Relegated

=== Third Division play-offs ===
Both the semifinals and the finals were decided over two legs.
The full results can be found at: Football League Division Three play-offs 1989.

Semi-finals; 1st leg –21/22 May; 2nd leg –25 May 1989
3rd | Port Vale | 1 | 3 | 4
6th | Preston North End | 1 | 1 | 2
4th | Fulham F.C. | 0 | 0 | 0
5th | Bristol Rovers | 1 | 4 | 5

Finals; 1st leg –31 May; 2nd leg –3 June 1989
3rd | Port Vale | 1 | 1 | 2
5th | Bristol Rovers | 1 | 0 | 1

=== Third Division results ===
| Home \ Away | ALD | BLP | BOL | BRE | BRI | BRR | BRY | CAR | CHE | CHF | FUL | GIL | HUD | MAN | NOR | NTC | PTV | PNE | REA | SHU | STD | SWA | WIG | WOL |
|---|---|---|---|---|---|---|---|---|---|---|---|---|---|---|---|---|---|---|---|---|---|---|---|---|
| Aldershot | | 1–0 | 0–3 | 0–0 | 0–1 | 1–3 | 4–1 | 0–1 | 1–1 | 2–0 | 1–2 | 0–2 | 0–1 | 0–0 | 5–1 | 2–3 | 2–2 | 2–1 | 1–1 | 1–0 | 2–2 | 0–1 | 3–1 | 1–2 |
| Blackpool | 4–0 | | 2–0 | 0–3 | 2–2 | 1–1 | 2–2 | 1–0 | 1–1 | 1–2 | 0–1 | 4–1 | 2–1 | 1–1 | 3–1 | 0–1 | 3–2 | 1–0 | 2–4 | 1–2 | 3–2 | 0–0 | 2–0 | 0–2 |
| Bolton Wanderers | 1–0 | 2–2 | | 4–2 | 2–0 | 1–1 | 2–4 | 4–0 | 0–1 | 5–0 | 3–2 | 2–1 | 3–1 | 0–0 | 2–1 | 3–3 | 1–1 | 1–0 | 1–1 | 2–0 | 0–0 | 1–0 | 1–1 | 1–2 |
| Brentford | 2–1 | 1–0 | 3–0 | | 3–0 | 2–1 | 2–2 | 1–1 | 0–1 | 1–0 | 0–1 | 1–0 | 1–0 | 1–0 | 2–0 | 2–1 | 2–1 | 0–2 | 3–2 | 1–4 | 4–0 | 1–1 | 1–1 | 2–2 |
| Bristol City | 1–1 | 1–2 | 1–1 | 0–1 | | 0–1 | 3–0 | 2–0 | 0–1 | 4–0 | 1–5 | 1–0 | 6–1 | 2–0 | 3–1 | 0–4 | 0–1 | 1–1 | 2–1 | 2–0 | 0–2 | 2–0 | 0–1 | 0–1 |
| Bristol Rovers | 2–2 | 1–0 | 2–0 | 1–2 | 1–1 | | 1–3 | 0–1 | 4–1 | 2–1 | 0–0 | 2–0 | 5–1 | 0–0 | 1–1 | 2–0 | 2–2 | 1–0 | 1–1 | 1–1 | 1–1 | 1–1 | 3–2 | 0–0 |
| Bury | 0–1 | 0–0 | 0–0 | 3–1 | 2–1 | 0–0 | | 1–0 | 2–1 | 2–1 | 3–1 | 1–0 | 0–6 | 0–1 | 0–1 | 1–1 | 0–0 | 1–1 | 2–1 | 1–2 | 3–1 | 1–0 | 1–1 | 3–1 |
| Cardiff City | 3–2 | 0–0 | 1–0 | 1–0 | 1–1 | 2–2 | 3–0 | | 2–0 | 0–1 | 1–2 | 1–0 | 3–0 | 0–0 | 1–0 | 0–1 | 3–0 | 0–0 | 1–2 | 0–0 | 2–0 | 2–2 | 2–2 | 1–1 |
| Chester | 1–1 | 1–1 | 0–0 | 3–2 | 2–0 | 0–2 | 2–0 | 0–0 | | 3–1 | 7–0 | 2–0 | 3–0 | 0–0 | 2–1 | 1–0 | 1–2 | 0–1 | 3–0 | 0–1 | 2–4 | 3–1 | 1–0 | 1–1 |
| Chesterfield | 2–1 | 0–2 | 1–1 | 2–2 | 1–0 | 0–3 | 1–2 | 4–0 | 1–2 | | 4–1 | 3–1 | 1–1 | 1–3 | 1–1 | 3–0 | 1–2 | 0–3 | 2–4 | 2–1 | 2–1 | 2–0 | 1–1 | 0–3 |
| Fulham | 5–1 | 1–1 | 1–1 | 3–3 | 3–1 | 0–2 | 1–0 | 2–0 | 4–1 | 2–1 | | 1–2 | 1–2 | 1–1 | 3–2 | 2–1 | 1–2 | 2–1 | 2–1 | 2–2 | 1–0 | 1–0 | 1–1 | 2–2 |
| Gillingham | 1–1 | 1–0 | 0–1 | 0–0 | 0–1 | 2–3 | 3–4 | 1–2 | 0–2 | 0–1 | 0–1 | | 1–2 | 3–0 | 1–0 | 2–1 | 1–0 | 1–3 | 0–1 | 2–1 | 1–1 | 2–3 | 2–1 | 1–3 |
| Huddersfield Town | 2–1 | 1–1 | 0–1 | 1–2 | 0–1 | 2–3 | 3–2 | 1–0 | 3–1 | 1–1 | 2–0 | 1–1 | | 2–0 | 1–2 | 3–1 | 0–0 | 2–0 | 2–2 | 3–2 | 3–2 | 1–1 | 1–1 | 0–0 |
| Mansfield Town | 1–1 | 0–1 | 1–1 | 1–0 | 2–2 | 2–1 | 1–1 | 2–2 | 2–0 | 3–1 | 3–1 | 2–1 | 1–0 | | 1–1 | 1–1 | 0–1 | 0–3 | 2–1 | 0–1 | 4–0 | 0–0 | 0–1 | 3–1 |
| Northampton Town | 6–0 | 4–2 | 2–3 | 1–0 | 1–3 | 1–2 | 2–0 | 3–0 | 0–2 | 3–0 | 2–1 | 1–2 | 1–3 | 2–1 | | 1–3 | 1–3 | 1–0 | 1–3 | 1–2 | 2–2 | 1–0 | 1–1 | 3–1 |
| Notts County | 4–1 | 1–1 | 2–0 | 3–0 | 0–0 | 1–0 | 3–0 | 2–0 | 2–2 | 4–0 | 0–1 | 1–2 | 3–0 | 2–1 | 0–1 | | 1–4 | 0–0 | 3–3 | 1–4 | 1–1 | 1–0 | 1–0 | 1–1 |
| Port Vale | 3–0 | 1–0 | 2–1 | 3–2 | 0–1 | 1–0 | 1–3 | 6–1 | 1–2 | 5–0 | 3–0 | 2–1 | 2–0 | 1–2 | 1–2 | 1–0 | | 1–1 | 3–0 | 3–3 | 2–0 | 2–1 | 2–1 | 0–0 |
| Preston North End | 2–2 | 1–0 | 3–1 | 5–3 | 2–0 | 1–1 | 1–0 | 3–3 | 3–3 | 6–0 | 1–4 | 5–0 | 1–0 | 2–0 | 3–2 | 3–0 | 1–3 | | 2–1 | 2–0 | 3–2 | 1–1 | 2–2 | 3–3 |
| Reading | 3–1 | 2–1 | 1–1 | 2–2 | 1–2 | 3–1 | 1–1 | 3–1 | 3–1 | 0–0 | 0–1 | 1–2 | 2–1 | 1–0 | 1–1 | 1–3 | 3–0 | 2–2 | | 1–3 | 4–0 | 2–0 | 0–3 | 0–2 |
| Sheffield United | 1–0 | 4–1 | 4–0 | 2–2 | 3–0 | 4–1 | 2–1 | 0–1 | 6–1 | 1–3 | 1–0 | 4–2 | 5–1 | 1–2 | 4–0 | 1–1 | 0–0 | 3–1 | 1–0 | | 1–2 | 5–1 | 2–1 | 2–0 |
| Southend United | 1–1 | 2–1 | 2–0 | 1–1 | 1–2 | 2–2 | 1–1 | 0–0 | 1–0 | 3–1 | 0–0 | 2–1 | 2–4 | 1–1 | 2–1 | 1–1 | 1–1 | 2–1 | 2–1 | 2–1 | | 0–2 | 1–2 | 3–1 |
| Swansea City | 1–0 | 1–2 | 1–0 | 1–1 | 1–1 | 1–2 | 1–1 | 1–1 | 1–1 | 2–0 | 2–0 | 3–2 | 1–0 | 3–1 | 1–0 | 2–0 | 0–0 | 1–1 | 2–0 | 2–2 | 2–0 | | 1–2 | 2–5 |
| Wigan Athletic | 2–1 | 2–1 | 1–1 | 1–1 | 0–1 | 3–0 | 1–0 | 1–0 | 3–0 | 0–2 | 0–1 | 3–0 | 0–2 | 0–0 | 1–3 | 0–1 | 0–2 | 1–1 | 3–0 | 1–2 | 3–0 | 1–2 | | 1–1 |
| Wolverhampton Wanderers | 1–0 | 2–1 | 1–0 | 2–0 | 2–0 | 0–1 | 4–0 | 2–0 | 3–1 | 1–0 | 5–2 | 6–1 | 4–1 | 6–2 | 3–2 | 0–0 | 3–3 | 6–0 | 2–1 | 2–2 | 3–0 | 1–1 | 2–1 | |

Legend: Blue = home team win; Yellow = draw; Red = away team win.

=== Third Division maps ===
Locations of the Football League Third Division London teams 1988–1989
Locations of the Football League Third Division teams 1988–1989

== Fourth Division ==
Football LeagueFourth Division
- Season: 1988–89
- Champions: Rotherham United (1st title)
- Promoted: Crewe Alexandra; Leyton Orient; Tranmere Rovers
- Relegated to Conference: Darlington
- New club in the league: Lincoln City
- Matches: 552
- Goals: 1,498 (2.71 per match)
- Top goalscorer: Phil Stant (Hereford United), 28

Rotherham United sealed an instant return to the Third Division as champions of the Fourth Division, while runners-up Tranmere (who had been in the battle to avoid relegation to the Conference two seasons earlier) managed to climb out of the league's basement division after spending a whole decade there. The final automatic promotion place went to Crewe, who had spent 20 consecutive seasons in the Fourth Division and had to apply for re-election seven times, before the arrival of Dario Gradi as manager in June 1983 had overseen an upturn in fortunes at Gresty Road.

Promotion had seemed out of the question for Leyton Orient, when they stood 15th in the league on 1 March 1989 with barely a quarter of the season left to play. But an excellent finish to the season saw them rise to sixth place in the final table, and they triumphed in the playoffs to clinch the division's fourth and final promotion place.

Darlington were relegated from the league as the Fourth Division's bottom club, after a post-Christmas resurgence by Colchester after the Essex side appointed Jock Wallace as manager, and the league newcomers for 1989–90 were Conference champions Maidstone United.

| Pos | Team | Pld | W | D | L | GF | GA | GD | Pts | Promotion or relegation |
|---|---|---|---|---|---|---|---|---|---|---|
| 1 | Rotherham United (C, P) | 46 | 22 | 16 | 8 | 76 | 35 | +41 | 82 | Promotion to the Third Division |
| 2 | Tranmere Rovers (P) | 46 | 21 | 17 | 8 | 62 | 43 | +19 | 80 | Promotion to the Third Division |
| 3 | Crewe Alexandra (P) | 46 | 21 | 15 | 10 | 67 | 48 | +19 | 78 | Promotion to the Third Division |
| 4 | Scunthorpe United | 46 | 21 | 14 | 11 | 77 | 57 | +20 | 77 | Qualification for the Fourth Division play-offs |
| 5 | Scarborough | 46 | 21 | 14 | 11 | 67 | 52 | +15 | 77 | Qualification for the Fourth Division play-offs |
| 6 | Leyton Orient (O, P) | 46 | 21 | 12 | 13 | 86 | 50 | +36 | 75 | Qualification for the Fourth Division play-offs |
| 7 | Wrexham | 46 | 19 | 14 | 13 | 77 | 63 | +14 | 71 | Qualification for the Fourth Division play-offs |
| 8 | Cambridge United | 46 | 18 | 14 | 14 | 71 | 62 | +9 | 68 | |
| 9 | Grimsby Town | 46 | 17 | 15 | 14 | 65 | 59 | +6 | 66 | |
| 10 | Lincoln City | 46 | 18 | 10 | 18 | 64 | 60 | +4 | 64 | |
| 11 | York City | 46 | 17 | 13 | 16 | 62 | 63 | −1 | 64 | |
| 12 | Carlisle United | 46 | 15 | 15 | 16 | 53 | 52 | +1 | 60 | |
| 13 | Exeter City | 46 | 18 | 6 | 22 | 65 | 68 | −3 | 60 | |
| 14 | Torquay United | 46 | 17 | 8 | 21 | 45 | 60 | −15 | 59 | |
| 15 | Hereford United | 46 | 14 | 16 | 16 | 66 | 72 | −6 | 58 | |
| 16 | Burnley | 46 | 14 | 13 | 19 | 52 | 61 | −9 | 55 | |
| 17 | Peterborough United | 46 | 14 | 12 | 20 | 52 | 74 | −22 | 54 | |
| 18 | Rochdale | 46 | 13 | 14 | 19 | 56 | 82 | −26 | 53 | |
| 19 | Hartlepool United | 46 | 14 | 10 | 22 | 50 | 78 | −28 | 52 | |
| 20 | Stockport County | 46 | 10 | 21 | 15 | 54 | 52 | +2 | 51 | |
| 21 | Halifax Town | 46 | 13 | 11 | 22 | 69 | 75 | −6 | 50 | |
| 22 | Colchester United | 46 | 12 | 14 | 20 | 60 | 78 | −18 | 50 | |
| 23 | Doncaster Rovers | 46 | 13 | 10 | 23 | 49 | 78 | −29 | 49 | |
| 24 | Darlington (R) | 46 | 8 | 18 | 20 | 53 | 76 | −23 | 42 | Relegation to the Football Conference |

(C) Champions; (O) Play-off winners; (P) Promoted; (R) Relegated

=== Fourth Division play-offs ===
Both the semifinals and the finals were decided over two legs.
The full results can be found at: Football League Division Four play-offs 1989.

Semi-finals; 1st leg –21 May; 2nd leg –24 May 1989
4th | Scunthorpe United | 1 | 0 | 1
7th | Wrexham | 3 | 2 | 5
5th | Scarborough | 1 | 0 | 1
6th | Leyton Orient | 0 | 2 | 2

Finals; 1st leg –30 May; 2nd leg –3 June 1989
7th | Wrexham | 0 | 1 | 1
6th | Leyton Orient | 0 | 2 | 2

=== Fourth Division results ===
| Home \ Away | BUR | CAM | CRL | COL | CRE | DAR | DON | EXE | GRI | HAL | HAR | HER | LEY | LIN | PET | ROC | ROT | SCA | SCU | STP | TOR | TRA | WRE | YOR |
|---|---|---|---|---|---|---|---|---|---|---|---|---|---|---|---|---|---|---|---|---|---|---|---|---|
| Burnley | | 2–0 | 0–0 | 2–0 | 1–0 | 0–1 | 3–0 | 3–0 | 1–0 | 2–1 | 0–0 | 3–3 | 2–2 | 1–4 | 1–1 | 2–1 | 1–0 | 0–1 | 0–1 | 1–0 | 1–0 | 2–2 | 1–3 | 6–0 |
| Cambridge United | 2–1 | | 3–2 | 3–1 | 1–1 | 1–3 | 0–0 | 2–0 | 4–1 | 2–1 | 6–0 | 2–1 | 2–2 | 2–3 | 2–1 | 2–0 | 1–1 | 2–2 | 0–3 | 1–0 | 3–0 | 1–1 | 2–0 | 1–1 |
| Carlisle United | 0–0 | 1–1 | | 1–2 | 0–1 | 1–2 | 0–1 | 1–0 | 2–1 | 3–1 | 2–1 | 3–0 | 2–1 | 2–1 | 2–2 | 1–0 | 0–2 | 0–1 | 0–3 | 1–1 | 2–1 | 1–1 | 1–2 | 0–0 |
| Colchester United | 2–2 | 1–2 | 1–1 | | 2–1 | 1–2 | 0–1 | 4–0 | 0–0 | 3–2 | 1–2 | 1–1 | 1–0 | 1–3 | 1–2 | 3–0 | 1–1 | 3–1 | 1–2 | 1–1 | 2–2 | 2–3 | 2–1 | 1–0 |
| Crewe Alexandra | 4–0 | 2–0 | 1–0 | 3–1 | | 2–0 | 0–2 | 2–1 | 2–2 | 2–2 | 3–0 | 2–1 | 2–1 | 2–0 | 1–1 | 3–1 | 1–3 | 1–1 | 3–2 | 1–1 | 0–0 | 2–1 | 2–2 | 1–2 |
| Darlington | 1–1 | 1–1 | 2–3 | 1–2 | 1–1 | | 1–3 | 2–2 | 1–1 | 0–2 | 0–0 | 0–0 | 1–3 | 2–1 | 2–2 | 1–2 | 1–1 | 2–1 | 3–3 | 1–4 | 0–0 | 1–2 | 2–1 | 2–2 |
| Doncaster Rovers | 1–0 | 1–1 | 1–3 | 3–1 | 0–1 | 1–0 | | 2–1 | 2–3 | 1–4 | 1–0 | 3–2 | 1–0 | 0–1 | 2–3 | 1–1 | 1–0 | 3–1 | 2–2 | 2–2 | 1–2 | 0–0 | 2–2 | 1–2 |
| Exeter City | 3–0 | 0–3 | 3–0 | 4–2 | 1–2 | 2–1 | 3–0 | | 2–1 | 4–1 | 2–1 | 3–1 | 1–1 | 0–1 | 3–1 | 5–1 | 0–0 | 1–0 | 2–2 | 2–2 | 3–0 | 0–1 | 0–2 | 2–0 |
| Grimsby Town | 1–0 | 4–0 | 0–0 | 2–2 | 0–0 | 0–0 | 5–0 | 2–1 | | 3–2 | 3–0 | 1–1 | 2–2 | 1–0 | 0–0 | 1–3 | 0–4 | 2–1 | 1–1 | 2–0 | 1–0 | 0–0 | 0–1 | 2–0 |
| Halifax Town | 1–2 | 0–0 | 3–3 | 3–2 | 0–1 | 1–0 | 2–0 | 0–3 | 2–1 | | 1–0 | 2–2 | 2–2 | 0–1 | 5–0 | 4–1 | 1–1 | 0–2 | 5–1 | 2–2 | 2–0 | 2–3 | 4–0 | 0–0 |
| Hartlepool United | 2–2 | 3–2 | 0–2 | 2–1 | 0–3 | 2–1 | 2–1 | 2–2 | 2–1 | 2–0 | | 1–1 | 1–0 | 3–2 | 2–1 | 0–1 | 1–1 | 3–1 | 0–2 | 2–2 | 0–1 | 2–2 | 1–3 | 0–1 |
| Hereford United | 0–0 | 4–2 | 2–1 | 1–1 | 0–1 | 1–1 | 3–1 | 1–0 | 2–1 | 3–1 | 2–0 | | 1–1 | 3–2 | 4–0 | 4–4 | 1–1 | 1–3 | 1–2 | 2–1 | 1–1 | 2–1 | 0–0 | 1–2 |
| Leyton Orient | 3–0 | 1–1 | 2–0 | 8–0 | 0–0 | 1–0 | 4–0 | 4–0 | 5–0 | 2–0 | 4–3 | 1–3 | | 3–1 | 1–2 | 3–0 | 3–1 | 2–3 | 4–1 | 1–2 | 3–1 | 2–0 | 0–1 | 4–0 |
| Lincoln City | 2–3 | 3–0 | 0–2 | 1–1 | 2–2 | 3–2 | 3–1 | 2–0 | 2–2 | 2–1 | 0–1 | 2–0 | 0–1 | | 1–1 | 4–1 | 0–1 | 2–2 | 1–0 | 0–0 | 1–0 | 2–1 | 4–3 | 2–1 |
| Peterborough United | 3–0 | 1–5 | 1–4 | 3–0 | 3–2 | 1–1 | 2–0 | 0–1 | 1–2 | 2–1 | 0–1 | 2–1 | 0–1 | 1–1 | | 1–0 | 0–3 | 1–4 | 1–2 | 1–0 | 3–1 | 1–1 | 1–0 | 0–1 |
| Rochdale | 2–1 | 2–1 | 0–0 | 1–1 | 2–1 | 2–2 | 2–0 | 2–1 | 0–2 | 1–1 | 0–0 | 2–2 | 0–3 | 2–2 | 0–0 | | 0–2 | 2–1 | 1–0 | 1–1 | 2–1 | 3–1 | 3–3 | 2–0 |
| Rotherham United | 3–1 | 0–0 | 2–1 | 2–0 | 1–2 | 1–2 | 3–0 | 0–1 | 1–0 | 2–0 | 4–0 | 6–0 | 4–1 | 2–0 | 1–1 | 3–1 | | 1–1 | 3–3 | 2–1 | 1–0 | 0–0 | 2–2 | 0–1 |
| Scarborough | 1–0 | 2–1 | 0–1 | 0–0 | 2–1 | 3–2 | 2–0 | 2–1 | 2–3 | 3–1 | 2–0 | 0–2 | 0–0 | 1–1 | 2–1 | 3–3 | 1–0 | | 1–0 | 1–1 | 5–2 | 0–0 | 0–3 | 0–0 |
| Scunthorpe United | 2–1 | 1–0 | 1–1 | 2–3 | 2–2 | 5–1 | 2–1 | 2–0 | 1–1 | 0–0 | 1–1 | 3–1 | 2–2 | 0–0 | 3–0 | 4–0 | 0–0 | 0–3 | | 1–1 | 1–0 | 0–1 | 3–1 | 4–2 |
| Stockport County | 0–0 | 0–0 | 1–1 | 1–0 | 0–1 | 0–0 | 2–0 | 4–0 | 3–1 | 1–1 | 3–0 | 1–2 | 0–0 | 1–0 | 1–2 | 3–0 | 1–3 | 2–2 | 1–2 | | 0–0 | 1–1 | 2–2 | 3–2 |
| Torquay United | 2–0 | 3–1 | 1–0 | 1–3 | 2–1 | 1–0 | 3–2 | 0–4 | 2–2 | 0–2 | 2–0 | 1–0 | 3–0 | 1–0 | 1–0 | 1–0 | 1–2 | 0–1 | 0–2 | 2–1 | | 3–2 | 0–0 | 2–0 |
| Tranmere Rovers | 2–1 | 1–2 | 0–0 | 0–0 | 1–1 | 2–0 | 2–2 | 2–0 | 3–2 | 2–0 | 2–1 | 1–0 | 3–0 | 1–0 | 1–0 | 2–0 | 0–0 | 1–1 | 2–1 | 1–0 | 3–0 | | 2–1 | 0–1 |
| Wrexham | 4–2 | 3–1 | 2–1 | 2–2 | 0–0 | 3–3 | 1–1 | 3–0 | 1–2 | 3–0 | 4–3 | 1–1 | 0–1 | 3–0 | 1–1 | 2–1 | 1–4 | 0–1 | 2–0 | 2–0 | 1–0 | 3–3 | | 2–1 |
| York City | 0–0 | 1–2 | 1–1 | 2–0 | 3–0 | 4–1 | 1–1 | 3–1 | 0–3 | 5–3 | 2–3 | 4–1 | 1–1 | 2–1 | 5–1 | 3–3 | 1–1 | 0–0 | 1–2 | 2–0 | 1–1 | 0–1 | 1–0 | |

Legend: Blue = home team win; Yellow = draw; Red = away team win.

=== Fourth Division maps ===
Locations of the Football League Fourth Division teams 1988–1989

== Attendances ==
=== Barclays League Division One ===
| No. | Club | Average |
|---|---|---|
| 1 | Liverpool FC | 38,574 |
| 2 | Manchester United | 36,488 |
| 3 | Arsenal FC | 35,595 |
| 4 | Everton FC | 27,765 |
| 5 | Tottenham Hotspur FC | 24,467 |
| 6 | Aston Villa FC | 23,310 |
| 7 | Newcastle United FC | 22,921 |
| 8 | Nottingham Forest FC | 20,785 |
| 9 | West Ham United FC | 20,738 |
| 10 | Sheffield Wednesday FC | 20,037 |
| 11 | Middlesbrough FC | 19,999 |
| 12 | Derby County FC | 17,535 |
| 13 | Norwich City FC | 16,785 |
| 14 | Coventry City FC | 16,040 |
| 15 | Southampton FC | 15,590 |
| 16 | Millwall FC | 15,416 |
| 17 | Queens Park Rangers FC | 12,281 |
| 18 | Luton Town FC | 9,504 |
| 19 | Charlton Athletic FC | 9,398 |
| 20 | Wimbledon FC | 7,824 |

=== Barclays League Division Two ===
| No. | Club | Average |
|---|---|---|
| 1 | Manchester City FC | 23,500 |
| 2 | Leeds United FC | 21,811 |
| 3 | Chelsea FC | 15,731 |
| 4 | Sunderland AFC | 14,878 |
| 5 | West Bromwich Albion FC | 12,757 |
| 6 | Ipswich Town FC | 12,666 |
| 7 | Watford FC | 12,292 |
| 8 | Leicester City FC | 10,694 |
| 9 | Crystal Palace FC | 10,655 |
| 10 | Bradford City AFC | 10,524 |
| 11 | Portsmouth FC | 10,201 |
| 12 | Stoke City FC | 9,817 |
| 13 | Brighton & Hove Albion FC | 9,048 |
| 14 | Blackburn Rovers FC | 8,891 |
| 15 | Swindon Town FC | 8,687 |
| 16 | Plymouth Argyle FC | 8,628 |
| 17 | AFC Bournemouth | 8,088 |
| 18 | Barnsley FC | 7,215 |
| 19 | Oldham Athletic FC | 7,204 |
| 20 | Hull City AFC | 6,666 |
| 21 | Oxford United FC | 6,352 |
| 22 | Birmingham City FC | 6,265 |
| 23 | Walsall FC | 6,108 |
| 24 | Shrewsbury Town FC | 4,706 |

=== Barclays League Division Three ===
| No. | Club | Average |
|---|---|---|
| 1 | Wolverhampton Wanderers FC | 14,392 |
| 2 | Sheffield United FC | 12,222 |
| 3 | Bristol City FC | 8,121 |
| 4 | Preston North End FC | 7,737 |
| 5 | Port Vale FC | 6,731 |
| 6 | Huddersfield Town AFC | 5,821 |
| 7 | Brentford FC | 5,682 |
| 8 | Notts County FC | 5,675 |
| 9 | Bolton Wanderers FC | 5,528 |
| 10 | Bristol Rovers FC | 5,259 |
| 11 | Reading FC | 5,106 |
| 12 | Fulham FC | 4,938 |
| 13 | Swansea City AFC | 4,897 |
| 14 | Cardiff City FC | 4,387 |
| 15 | Blackpool FC | 4,277 |
| 16 | Mansfield Town FC | 4,006 |
| 17 | Northampton Town FC | 3,919 |
| 18 | Chesterfield FC | 3,717 |
| 19 | Southend United FC | 3,699 |
| 20 | Gillingham FC | 3,675 |
| 21 | Bury FC | 3,368 |
| 22 | Wigan Athletic FC | 3,151 |
| 23 | Chester City FC | 3,056 |
| 24 | Aldershot Town FC | 2,609 |

=== Barclays League Division Four ===
| No. | Club | Average |
|---|---|---|
| 1 | Burnley FC | 7,062 |
| 2 | Tranmere Rovers | 5,331 |
| 3 | Rotherham United FC | 5,064 |
| 4 | Scunthorpe United FC | 4,547 |
| 5 | Grimsby Town FC | 4,302 |
| 6 | Lincoln City FC | 3,887 |
| 7 | Leyton Orient FC | 3,794 |
| 8 | Crewe Alexandra FC | 3,296 |
| 9 | Peterborough United FC | 3,262 |
| 10 | Carlisle United FC | 3,176 |
| 11 | Scarborough FC | 2,962 |
| 12 | Colchester United FC | 2,894 |
| 13 | Stockport County FC | 2,792 |
| 14 | Exeter City FC | 2,680 |
| 15 | Cambridge United FC | 2,653 |
| 16 | Wrexham AFC | 2,636 |
| 17 | York City FC | 2,614 |
| 18 | Torquay United FC | 2,350 |
| 19 | Darlington FC | 2,316 |
| 20 | Doncaster Rovers FC | 2,159 |
| 21 | Hereford United FC | 2,132 |
| 22 | Hartlepool United FC | 2,048 |
| 23 | Rochdale AFC | 1,968 |
| 24 | Halifax Town AFC | 1,947 |

== See also ==
- 1988–89 in English football
