= Stebbing (disambiguation) =

Stebbing is an English village.

Stebbing may also refer to:

== People with the surname ==
- Edward Percy Stebbing (1872–1960), British forester and forest entomologist in India
- Gary Stebbing (born 1965), English football player
- Henry Stebbing (1687–1763), English churchman and controversialist
- Henry Stebbing (editor) (1799–1883), English cleric and man of letters
- Susan Stebbing, (1885–1943), British philosopher
- Thomas Roscoe Rede Stebbing (1835–1926), English zoologist

== See also ==
- Stebbings, a surname
