= Ndubuisi Kanu Park =

Public park in Lagos, Nigeria

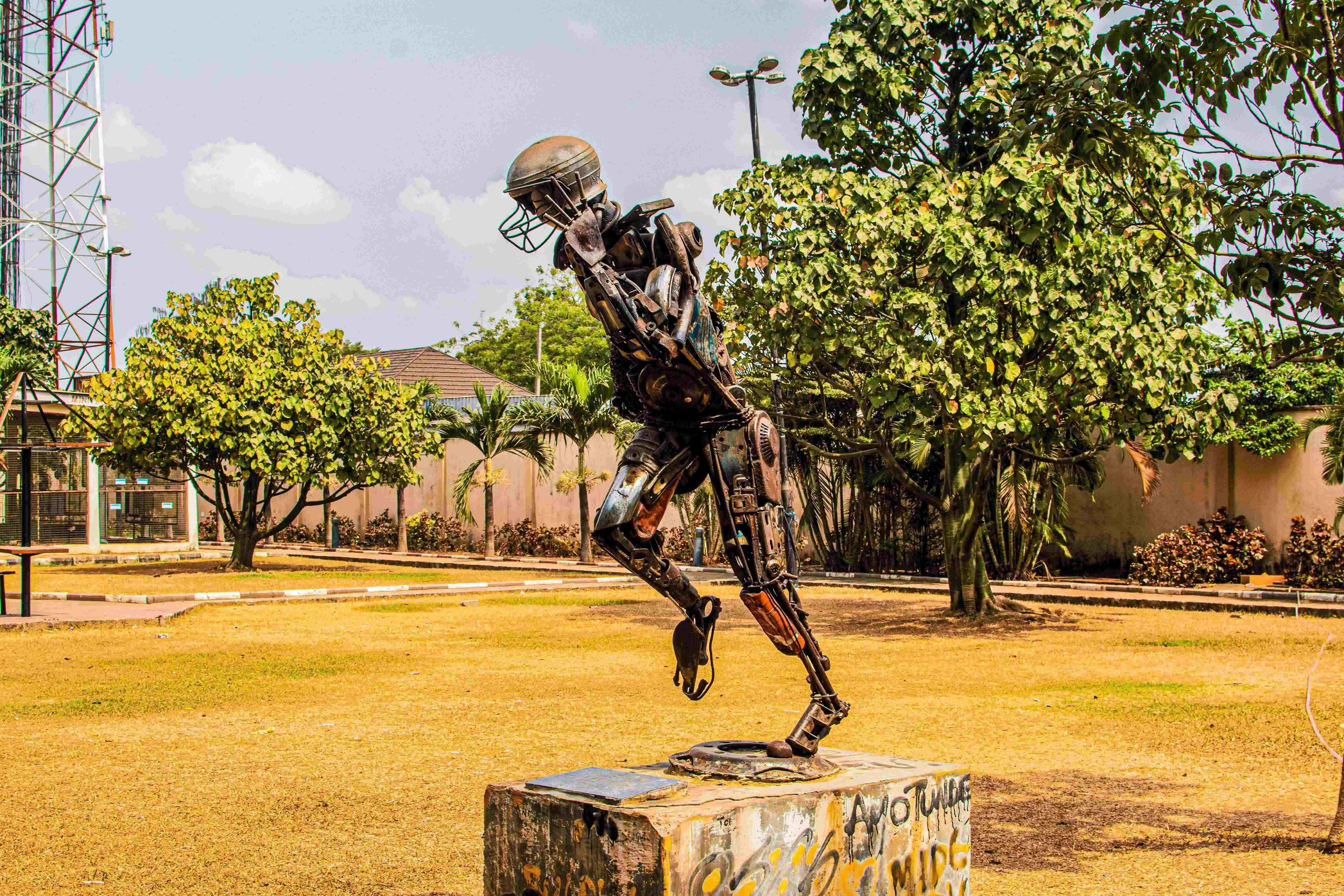
- A statue at Kanu Ndubuisi park
- Interactive map of Ndubuisi Kanu Park
- Coordinates: 6°36′51″N 3°21′57″E

The Kanu Ndubuisi Park is a public park and recreational center located in Ikeja, Lagos. It is a green space created and managed by the Lagos State Parks and Garden Agency. The park has a lawn tennis court, a basketball court, a play area for children, seats and benches, patios and sheds and snacks stands. It has a large green area for residents to host picnics and relax. It is in close proximity to the Johnson Jakande Tinubu Park.

== Environment and Climate ==
In a bid to promote a sustainable environment, several activities have been put in place at the Kanu Ndubuisi Park. These activities include environmental education/lecture at the park, tree planting amongst others.

== Gallery ==
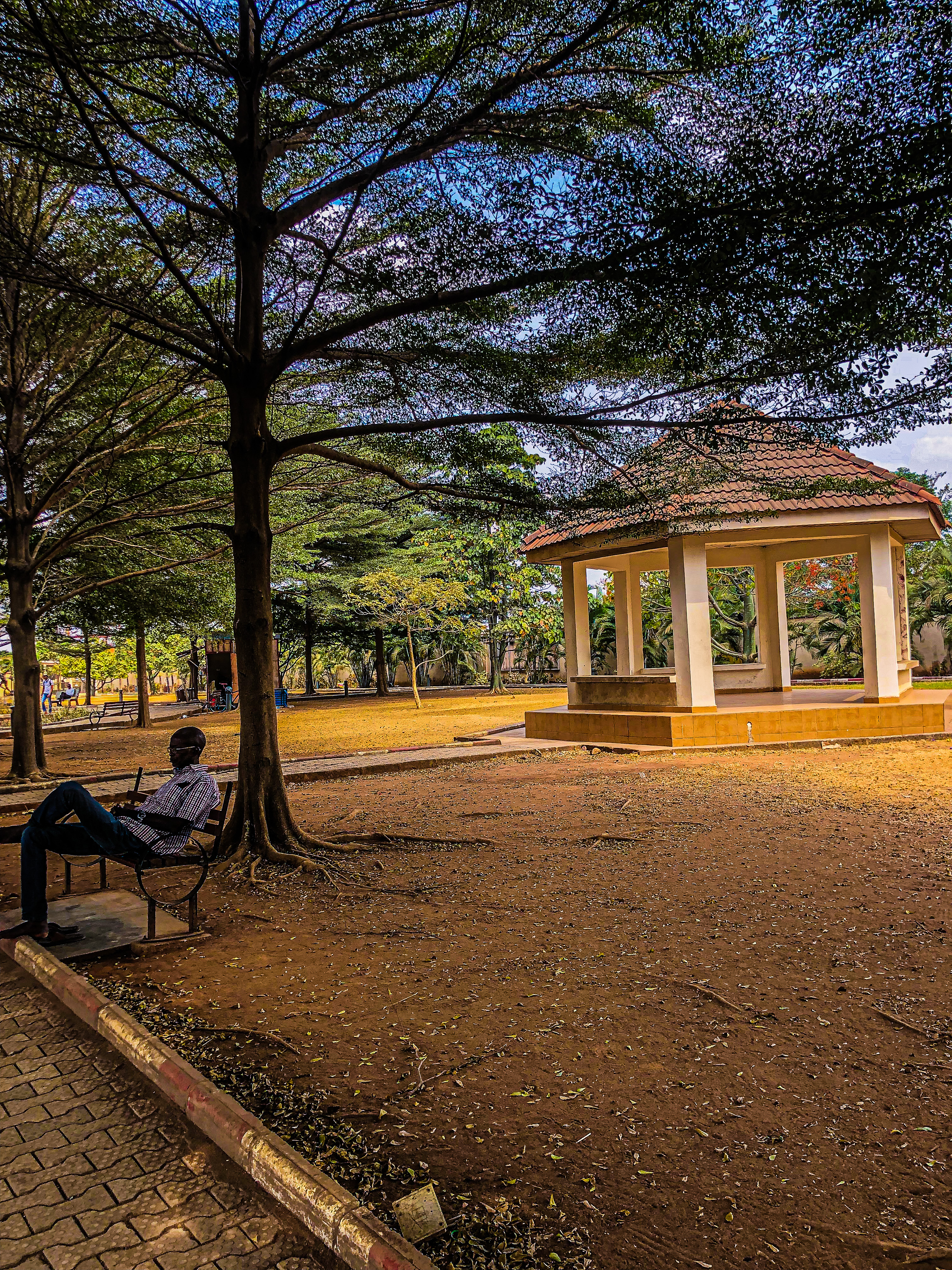

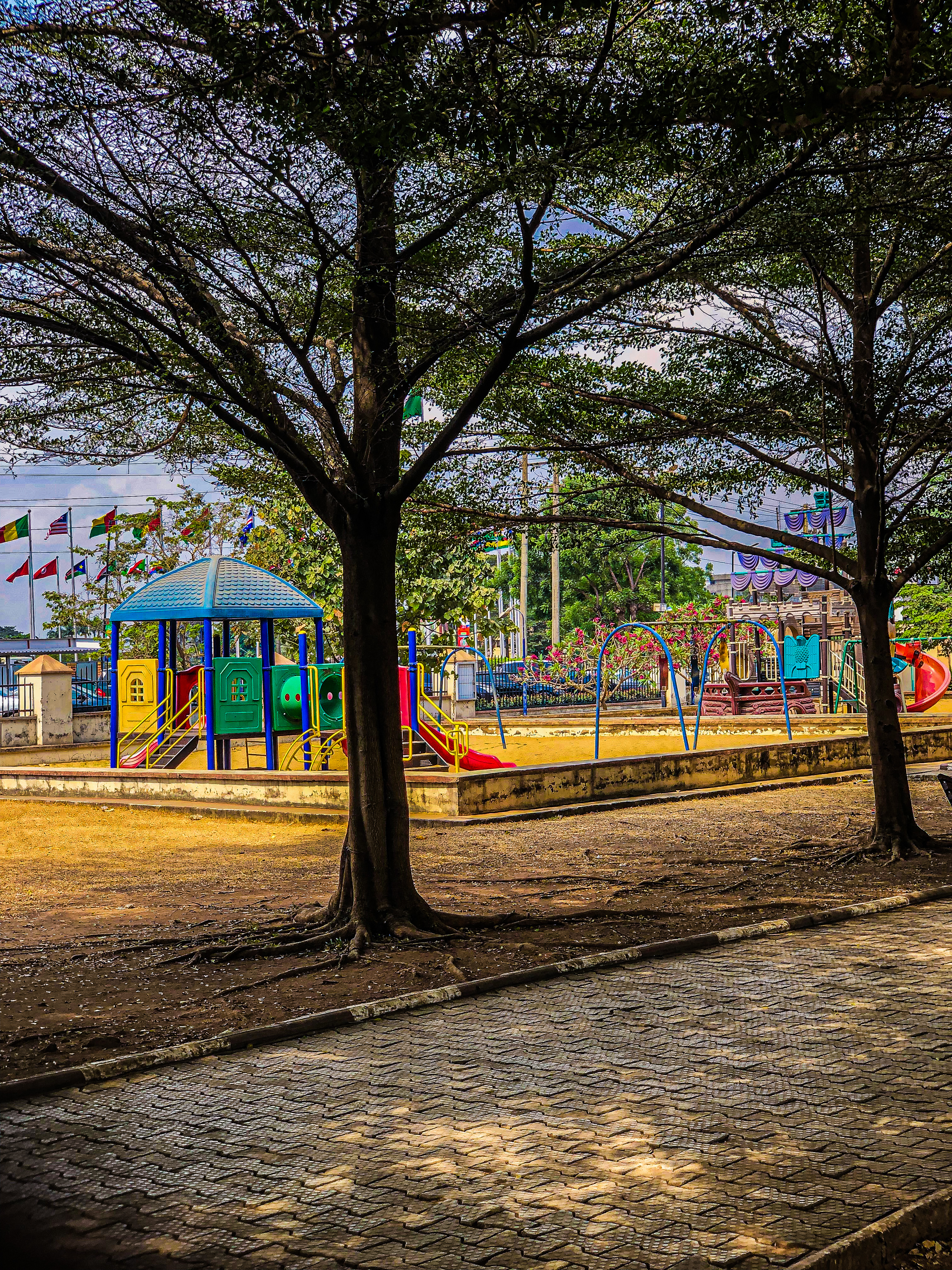

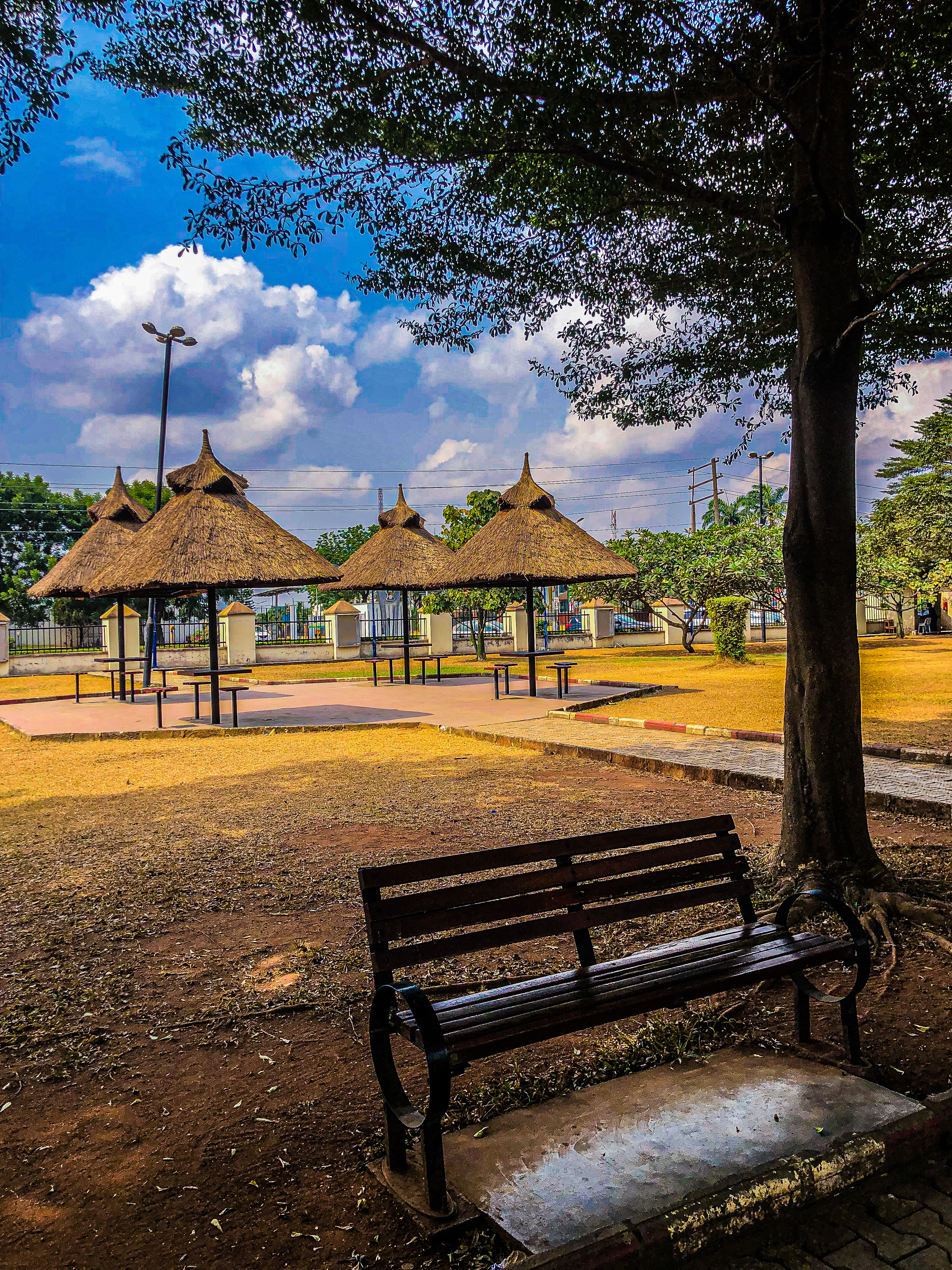

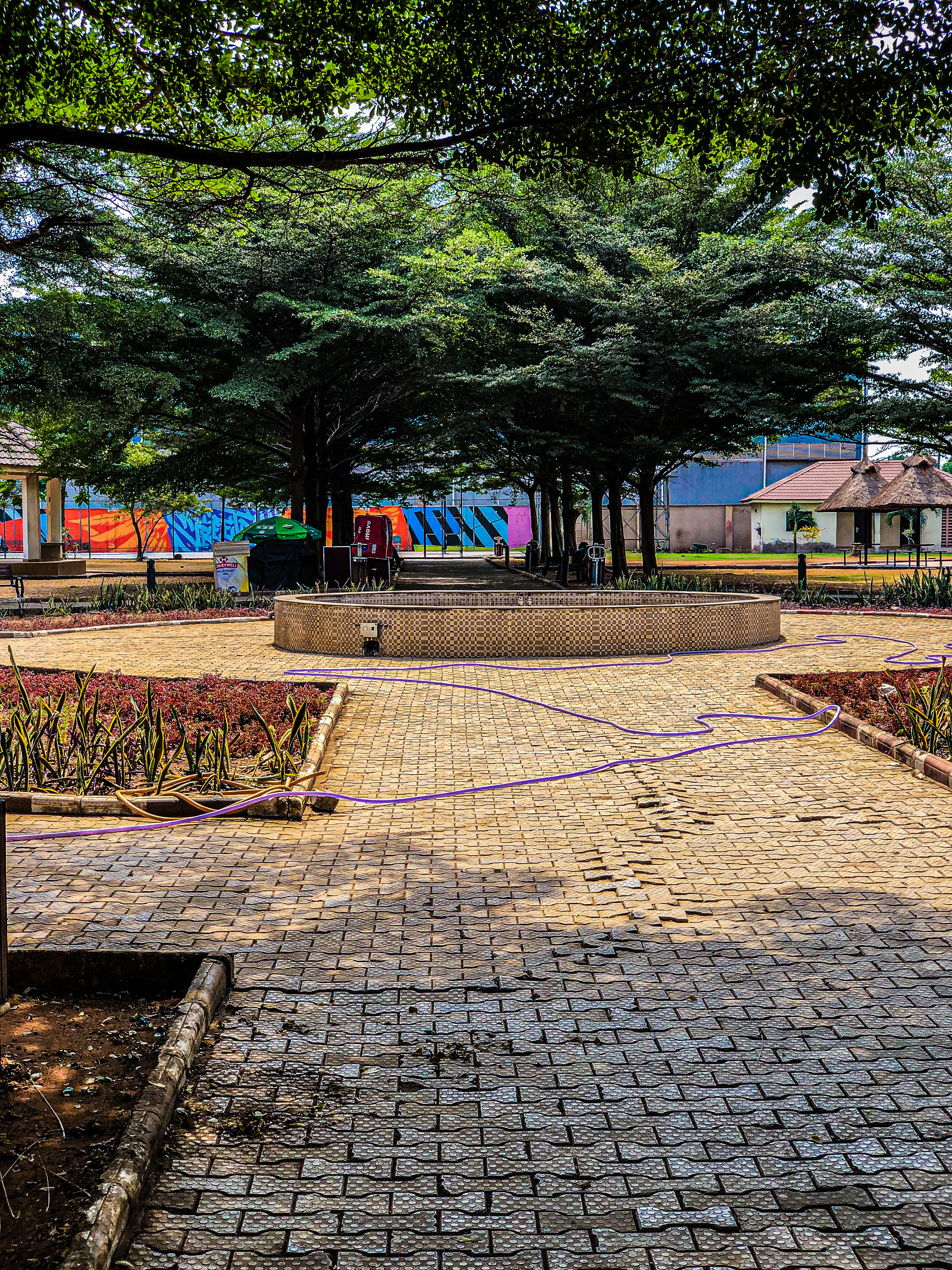
