= Ontse Ntesa =

Motswana footballer

Personal information
- Date of birth: 24 October 1989 (age 37)
- Place of birth: Selebi-Phikwe, Botswana
- Height: 1.75 m (5 ft 9 in)
- Position: Defender

Team information
- Current team: Black Forest

Senior career*
Years	Team	Apps	(Gls)
2007–2013	ECCO City Green		
2013–2017	Mochudi Centre Chiefs		
2017–2019	Uniao Flamengo Santos		
2019–?	Black Forest		

International career
2009–2010	Botswana	6	(0)
- * Club domestic league appearances and goals

Ontse Ntesa (born 24 October 1989) is a Motswana international footballer who plays as a defender for Motswana club Black Forest. He has won five caps for the Botswana national football team.

His transfer away from ECCO City Green in 2013 happened as the team struggled to find an investor.
