= Nick Salapatas =

British-Greek footballer (born 1989)

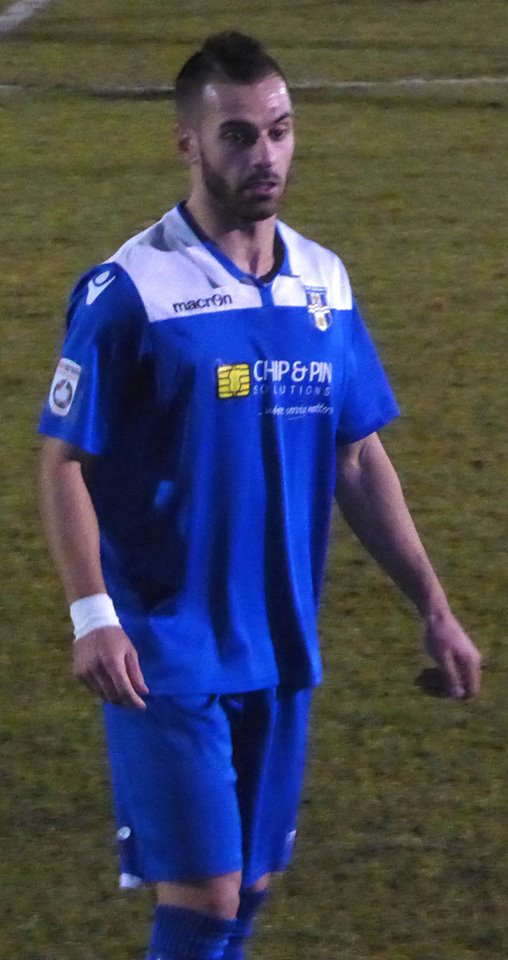
- Salapatas playing for Bishop's Stortford in the Herts Charity Cup Final

Personal information
- Full name: Nikos Salapatas
- Date of birth: 17 November 1989 (age 36)
- Place of birth: Cardiff, Wales
- Position: Winger

Team information
- Current team: Bishop's Stortford

Youth career
- 2003–2006: Chelsea Academy
- 2006: Olympiacos
- 2007: Luton Town

Senior career*
Years	Team	Apps	(Gls)
2007–2008	Wealdstone	17	(1)
2008–2009	Harrow Borough	9	(1)
2009	North Greenford United	24	(2)
2010	Stevenage	0	(0)
2010–2012	Interwood	38	(10)
2012–2013	Paniliakos	12	(0)
2013–2014	Doxa Vyronas	21	(2)
2014–2015	Harrow Borough	20	(4)
2015	Bishop's Stortford	1	(0)

International career^{‡}
2005	Greece U17	3	(1)
2006–2007	Greece U19	1	(0)
- * Club domestic league appearances and goals as of 11:00, 28 February 2015 (UTC) ‡ National team caps and goals as of 11:00, 28 February 2015 (UTC)

Nikos Salapatas (born 17 November 1989) is a British-Greek footballer who plays for Bishop's Stortford in the Conference South in England.

== Education ==
Salapatas obtained his BSc in Sports Science in October 2012 at Brunel University in London.

== Early career ==
He spent his early years from U12s - U16s at Chelsea Academy. Then he was transferred to Olympiacos on a 3-year contract where he was a regular for the Reserve team. After spending a year there he decided to play for Luton Town where he featured in their Youth/Reserve teams.

== Playing career ==
He started playing First team football for Wealdstone and later on Harrow Borough. During his University time he signed with Conference Premier side Stevenage in January 2010, which was the year Stevenage won the League. After spending two seasons training with Danny Bailey's Elite Academy and playing for his team Interwood, he joined Greek Football League 2 giants Paniliakos, under Greek manager Stelios Giannakopoulos. He was a regular in the team and with mainly his assists helped his team to get promoted to the Greek Football League. Next season he joined Athens-based Greek Football League 2 side Doxa Vyronas. After spending a year with Doxa, he moved to England and joined Harrow Borough, where he stayed for the first half of the season 2014–2015. In January 2015, he signed with Conference South side, Bishop's Stortford.

== Honours ==
Paniliakos

- Promotion to Greek Football League: 2013

Bishop's Stortford

- Herts Charity Cup Winners: 2015
