= Kristjan Lipovac =

Slovenian footballer

Personal information
- Full name: Kristjan Lipovac
- Date of birth: 3 December 1989 (age 36)
- Place of birth: SFR Yugoslavia
- Position: Goalkeeper

Senior career*
Years	Team	Apps	(Gls)
2006–2010	Aluminij	48	(0)
2010–2011	Olimpija Ljubljana	7	(0)
2011–2016	Aluminij	29	(0)
- * Club domestic league appearances and goals as of 14 December 2016

Kristian Lipovac (born 3 December 1989) is a Slovenian retired footballer who played as a goalkeeper.

Lipovac played his first match for Olimpija on 25 July 2010 against Gorica.
