= Giannis Litsis =

Greek footballer

Personal information
- Full name: Giannis Litsis
- Date of birth: 30 May 1989 (age 37)
- Place of birth: Athens, Greece
- Height: 1.82 m (5 ft 11 1/2 in)
- Position: Defender

Team information
- Current team: Apollon Smyrnis
- Number: 13

Youth career
- –2009: AO Pefkis

Senior career*
Years	Team	Apps	(Gls)
2009–2010	Ethnikos Piraeus		
2010–2011	Aias Salamina		
2011–2012	Vyzas	28	(0)
2012–2014	Panachaiki	38	(1)
2014–2015	Ermionida	4	(0)
2015–	Apollon Smyrnis	7	(0)
- * Club domestic league appearances and goals as of 28 June 2010

Giannis Litsis (Greek: Γιάννης Λίτσης; born 30 May 1989 in Athens, Greece) is a professional Greek footballer currently playing for Apollon Smyrnis in the Football League, as a defender.
