= Éric Batinga =

Equatoguinean footballer

Personal information
- Full name: Éric Aimé Batinga Mbong
- Date of birth: 8 April 1989 (age 37)
- Place of birth: Douala, Cameroon
- Height: 1.89 m (6 ft 2 in)
- Position: Right back

Senior career*
Years	Team	Apps	(Gls)
2011	Deportivo Mongomo		
2012–2013	Cercle Mbéri Sportif		
2014–2015	The Panthers		
2016–2017	Deportivo Mongomo		
2018	Deportivo Niefang		
2019	Leones Vegetarianos		

International career
2011	Equatorial Guinea	1	(0)
2011	Equatorial Guinea U-23	1	(0)
2011	Equatorial Guinea B	2	(0)
- * Club domestic league appearances and goals

Éric Aimé Batinga (born 8 April 1989) is a footballer who plays as a right back. Born in Cameroon, he played for the Equatorial Guinea national team.

== Career ==
Batinga was a member of the Deportivo Mongomo's squad in the 2011 CAF Champions League.

=== International career ===
Batinga made his debut with the Equatoguinean national team on 29 March 2011, when he played a friendly match against Gambia.
