= Levy Mokgothu =

South African footballer

Personal information
- Full name: Tsholofelo Levy Mokgothu
- Date of birth: 29 August 1989 (age 37)
- Place of birth: Bloemfontein, South Africa
- Position: Defender

Youth career
- Louriepark Crew
- 2004–2008: Platinum Stars
- 2008–2012: Highlands Park

Senior career*
Years	Team	Apps	(Gls)
2010–2011	United FC (loan)		
2012–2013	Manzini Sundowns		
2013–2014	Moroka Swallows	21	(0)
2014–2015	Kaizer Chiefs	0	(0)
- * Club domestic league appearances and goals

Levy Mokgothu (born 29 August 1989) is a South African former professional soccer player who played as a defender.
