= Sebastián Regueiro =

Uruguayan footballer (born 1989)

Personal information
- Full name: Marcelo Sebastián Regueiro Pintos
- Date of birth: September 13, 1989 (age 37)
- Place of birth: Montevideo, Uruguay
- Height: 1.68 m (5 ft 6 in)
- Position: Winger

Team information
- Current team: I.A. Potencia

Youth career
- –2007: Cerro

Senior career*
Years	Team	Apps	(Gls)
2007–2009	Cerro	18	(3)
2010	→ El Tanque Sisley (loan)	1	(0)
2010	Huracán	17	(4)
2011	Plaza Colonia	9	(1)
2012–	San Francisco		
- * Club domestic league appearances and goals as of February 1, 2012

Sebastián Regueiro (born 13 September 1989 in Montevideo) is an Uruguayan footballer who currently plays as a winger for San Francisco in the Liga Panameña de Fútbol. He is the nephew of Mario Regueiro who also plays as a winger but for Lanús in Argentina.
