= Henrika Gustytė =

Lithuanian footballer

Personal information
- Date of birth: 1 September 1989 (age 37)
- Position: Midfielder

International career^{‡}
Years	Team	Apps	(Gls)
2005–2007	Lithuania U19	7	(0)
2006–2015	Lithuania	4	(0)
- ‡ National team caps and goals as of 4 April 2015

Henrika Gustytė (born 1 September 1989) is a Lithuanian former footballer who played as a midfielder. She has been a member of the Lithuania women's national team.
