= Sigrun Kristiansen =

Faroese footballer

Personal information
- Date of birth: 23 July 1989 (age 37)
- Position: Defender

International career^{‡}
| Years | Team | Apps | (Gls) |
- Faroe Islands
- ‡ National team caps and goals as of 19:38, 30 August 2019 (UTC)

Sigrun Kristiansen (born 23 July 1989) is a Faroese footballer who plays as a defender and has appeared for the Faroe Islands women's national team.

== Career ==
Kristiansen has been capped for the Faroe Islands national team, appearing for the team during the 2019 FIFA Women's World Cup qualifying cycle.
