= Toni Huuhka =

Finnish footballer (born 1989)

Personal information
- Date of birth: 4 February 1989 (age 37)
- Place of birth: Lahti, Finland
- Height: 1.85 m (6 ft 1 in)
- Position: Centre back

Team information
- Current team: FC Lahti
- Number: 12

Youth career
- FC Kuusysi

Senior career*
| Years | Team | Apps | (Gls) |
| 2007–2008 | City Stars | 30 | (2) |
| 2009–2011 | FC Lahti | 30 | (1) |
| 2009 | → FC Hämeenlinna (loan) | 1 | (0) |
| 2012 | FC Kuusysi | 17 | (3) |
| 2013 | FC Lahti Akatemia | 13 | (0) |
| 2013 | → FC Lahti | 1 | (0) |

Managerial career
- 2015–: FC Lahti (assistant coach)
- * Club domestic league appearances and goals as of End of Career 2013

Toni Huuhka (born 4 February 1989) is a Finnish footballer. Since 2015, he has coached for FC Lahti.

== Career ==
Huuhka played in the Veikkausliiga for FC Lahti and FC Hämeenlinna, as well in the Kakkonen for FC Kuusysi, FC Lahti Akatemia and FC City Stars.

=== Coaching career ===
In October 2015, retired and was named on 20 October as Assistant coach by FC Lahti.
