= Omar Yabroudi =

Emirati football recruitment head

Omar Abdullah Hasan Yabroudi (born October 20, 1989) is an Emirati football recruitment head. He is currently the assistant general secretary – technical affairs of the UAE Football Association. He is known as being the first and only Emirati to be working as a player recruitment manager of a Premier League club.

== Early life and education ==
Yabroudi was born in Sharjah, UAE. He took a different route to his family-owned construction company with his father and brothers, Hasan and Faisal, and decided to pursue a career in football. Yabroudi was a high school graduate of Emirates International School in Dubai.

Following his passion for football, Yabroudi earned his Bachelor of Science (BSC) in Sports Science and Football from Liverpool John Moores University (2007 - 2010).

== Career ==
In 2010, at the age of 19, Yabroudi commenced with an internship at Accrington Stanley F.C.

From 2010 to 2012, he worked as the first-team scout under manager Dougie Freedman where together they built the squad that eventually achieved promotion back to the Premier League. Yabroudi and Dougie Freedman were responsible for recruiting a host of players that would then prove to be crucial in Crystal Palace's success in the Championship and Premier League. Top scorer Glenn Murray and captain Mile Jedinak were signed on free transfers while Yannick Bolasie joined the club for £300,000. On August 15, 2016, with the club plying its trade in the Premier League, they had sold Yannick Bolasie for £28m to Everton.

From October 2012 – 2015, Yabroudi was part of Barnet F.C. as a Performance Analyst and Head of Recruitment, after being contacted by Edgar Davids. One of Yabroudi's key signings was Luisma Villa, who had been signed from Spain on a free transfer. He had become a fans favourite whilst firing in 13 goals that season to help propel the club into League Two.

In June 2015, after a three-season stint at Barnet, Yabroudi was appointed as Head of Recruitment at Nottingham Forest F.C. Yabroudi and Freedman were reunited again for the second time. Collectively, they had made a host of quality signings to improve the club's fortunes in spite of being under a transfer embargo they were able to compete for a playoff spot during the majority of the season. Nelson Oliveira who was brought in to Nottingham Forest FC on a free season-long loan went onto scoring 9 goals that season and was subsequently sold to Norwich City from S.L. Benfica the following season for £7m. Yabroudi and Dougie Freedman had helped guide Nottingham Forest F.C. to a 13 match unbeaten run extending to January 30, 2016. Yabroudi was headhunted by Arsenal FC for the role of the first-team scout which he refused in order to keep his loyalty to Dougie Freedman and continue the good work they had started at the club.

In 2017, Dougie Freedman approached Yabroudi for the position of Player Recruitment Manager at Crystal Palace, marking his return to the club.

In January 2018, Yabroudi and Dougie Freedman recruited Goalkeeper Vicente Guaita on a free transfer which proved to be an excellent piece of business hailed by the fans. The following summer, striker Jordan Ayew joined the club for £2.5m and had become the top scorer during the 2019–2020 season.

In April 2021, Yabroudi stepped down as Crystal Palace's recruitment manager after being offered the role of assistant general secretary – technical affairs of the UAE Football Association.
