= Dario Dussin =

Swiss footballer (born 1989

Personal information
- Full name: Dario Dussin
- Date of birth: 13 April 1989 (age 37)
- Place of birth: Switzerland
- Height: 1.81 m (5 ft 11 1/2 in)
- Position: Midfielder

Team information
- Current team: FC Biel-Bienne
- Number: 24

Senior career*
Years	Team	Apps	(Gls)
2006–2007	FC Wohlen	3	(0)
2007–2010	BSC Young Boys	0	(0)
2009–2010	→ FC Biel-Bienne (loan)	20	(5)
2012–	FC Biel-Bienne	11	(1)
- * Club domestic league appearances and goals as of 6 July 2012 ‡ National team caps and goals as of 19 December 2010

Dario Dussin (born 13 April 1989) is a Swiss professional footballer who currently plays as a defender for FC Biel-Bienne in the Swiss Challenge League.
