= Joseph Steward Leopold =

Mauritian footballer

Personal information
- Full name: Joseph Kinsley Steward Leopold
- Date of birth: 8 June 1989 (age 37)
- Position: Goalkeeper

Team information
- Current team: AS Port-Louis 2000

Senior career*
Years	Team	Apps	(Gls)
2014–	AS Port-Louis 2000		

International career^{‡}
2016–	Mauritius	1	(0)
- * Club domestic league appearances and goals as of 11:34, 12 March 2017 (UTC) ‡ National team caps and goals as of 11:34, 12 March 2017 (UTC)

Joseph Kinsley Steward Leopold (born 8 June 1989) is a Mauritian footballer who plays for AS Port-Louis 2000 and the national team as a goalkeeper. He was arrested for alleged drug dealing in September 2016, and was subjected to a travel ban.
