= Matías Banco =

Argentine footballer (born 1989)

Personal information
- Full name: Matías Ezequiel Banco
- Date of birth: 3 July 1989 (age 37)
- Place of birth: Mendoza, Argentina
- Height: 1.73 m (5 ft 8 in)
- Position: Midfielder

Youth career
- Deportivo Guaymallén

Senior career*
Years	Team	Apps	(Gls)
2008–2011	Independiente Rivadavia	1	(0)
2010	→ Andes Talleres (loan)	–	(–)
2011–2012	Deportivo Guaymallén	41	(2)
2012–2013	Unión San Felipe	4	(0)
2012	Unión San Felipe B	4	(0)
2013–2014	Lota Schwager	24	(0)
2014–2015	Deportivo Guaymallén		
2015	Deportivo Maipú	18	(0)
2016	Luján de Cuyo	8	(0)
- * Club domestic league appearances and goals

Matías Ezequiel Banco (born 3 July 1989) is an Argentine former footballer who played as a midfielder.

== Teams ==
He played for Chilean clubs like Unión San Felipe or Lota Schwager.

- (Argentina) Independiente Rivadavia 2008–2009
- (Argentina) Andes Talleres 2010
- (Argentina) Independiente Rivadavia 2010–2011
- (Argentina) Deportivo Guaymallén 2011–2012
- (Chile) Unión San Felipe 2012–2013
- (Chile) Unión San Felipe B 2012
- (Chile) Lota Schwager 2013–2014
- (Argentina) Deportivo Guaymallén 2014–2015
- (Argentina) Deportivo Maipú 2015
- (Argentina) Luján de Cuyo 2016
