= Dawid Dynarek =

Polish footballer

Personal information
- Full name: Dawid Dynarek
- Date of birth: 19 October 1989 (age 37)
- Place of birth: Tychy, Poland
- Height: 1.81 m (5 ft 11 1/2 in)
- Position: Midfielder

Team information
- Current team: Wiślanie Skawina
- Number: 23

Youth career
- Unia Oświęcim
- Cracovia

Senior career*
| Years | Team | Apps | (Gls) |
| 2008–2013 | Cracovia | 3 | (0) |
| 2009 | → Okocimski Brzesko (loan) | 17 | (1) |
| 2011 | → GLKS Nadarzyn (loan) | 16 | (0) |
| 2011–2012 | → Okocimski Brzesko (loan) | 27 | (1) |
| 2013 | Przebój Wolbrom | 12 | (1) |
| 2013–2018 | Soła Oświęcim | 140 | (18) |
| 2018–2021 | Podhale Nowy Targ | 100 | (16) |
| 2021– | Wiślanie Skawina | 142 | (28) |
- * Club domestic league appearances and goals as of 16:15, 4 June 2026 (UTC)

Dawid Dynarek (born 19 October 1989) is a Polish professional footballer who plays as a midfielder for III liga club Wiślanie Skawina.

== Honours ==
Okocimski Brzesko

- II liga East: 2011–12

Wiślanie Skawina

- IV liga Lesser Poland: 2022–23
