= Natalia Saratovtseva =

Russian-Azerbaijani footballer (born 1989)

Personal information
- Full name: Natalia Saratovtseva
- Date of birth: 3 October 1989 (age 37)
- Place of birth: Soviet Union
- Position: Defender

Senior career*
Years	Team	Apps	(Gls)
2006	Prialit Reutov		
2007	Khimki		
2008	Nadezhda Noginsk		
2009	Energiya Voronezh	3	(0)
2011	Rossiyanka	16	(0)
2012-2015	Zorkiy Krasnogorsk	43	(3)
2015	Magnolia Novotitarovskaya		

International career
2006	Russia U20		
2009	Azerbaijan		
- * Club domestic league appearances and goals

Natalia Saratovtseva is a former Russian football defender, also represented Azerbaijan. She played for various clubs in Russia including Rossiyanka in the Russian Championship.

As an Under-19 international, she played the 2006 U-19 European Championship for Russia. However, she subsequently decided to play for Azerbaijan as a senior international.
