= Nikola Ivanović (footballer) =

Serbian footballer

Personal information
- Full name: Nikola Ivanović
- Date of birth: 20 January 1989 (age 37)
- Place of birth: Čačak, SFR Yugoslavia
- Height: 1.85 m (6 ft 1 in)
- Position: Centre forward

Team information
- Current team: Prilike

Senior career*
Years	Team	Apps	(Gls)
2007–2008	Borac Čačak	0	(0)
2008	→ Sloboda Čačak (loan)	13	(5)
2008	Mladost Lučani	9	(1)
2009	Radnički Kragujevac	6	(3)
2009–2011	Trudbenik Beograd		
2011	Sloboda Čačak	11	(2)
2012	Čukarički	15	(4)
2012	Celje	15	(4)
2013	Javor Ivanjica	3	(0)
2013	→ PFO Panopoulos (loan)		
2014	Polet Ljubić	9	(1)
2014-2016	Dragačevo Guča		
2016-2020	Budućnost Arilje		
2020-2021	Sevojno		
2021-2022	Polet Ljubić		
2022	Jedinstvo Konjevići		
2023	Budućnost Arilje		
2023-	Prilike		
- * Club domestic league appearances and goals as of 29 July 2014

Nikola Ivanović (Serbian Cyrillic: Никола Ивановић; born 20 January 1989) is a Serbian football forward.
