= Surafiel Tesfamicael =

Eritrean footballer

Surafiel Tesfamicael (born 17 March 1989) is an Eritrean footballer. He currently plays for the Eritrea national football team.

== International career ==
Tesfamichael played in the 2009 CECAFA Cup in Kenya, appearing as a substitute in the 4–0 quarter-final defeat to Tanzania.
