= 1989 Cambodian League =

Cambodian League
- Season: 1989

The 1989 Cambodian League season is the 8th season of top-tier football in Cambodia. Statistics of the Cambodian League for the 1989 season.

== Overview ==
Ministry of Transports won the championship.
