= Donald Solomon =

Caymanian footballer (born 1989)

Personal information
- Full name: Donald Brumson Solomon Jr.
- Date of birth: 2 October 1989 (age 37)
- Place of birth: Cayman Islands
- Position: Defender

Team information
- Current team: George Town SC

Senior career*
Years	Team	Apps	(Gls)
2007–	George Town SC		
2010–2011	Ashford Town (Middlesex)	1	(0)

International career^{‡}
2011–	Cayman Islands Under-23's	3	(0)
2006–	Cayman Islands	13	(0)
- * Club domestic league appearances and goals ‡ National team caps and goals as of 12:39, 9 April 2012 (UTC)

Donald Brumson Solomon Jr. (born 2 October 1989) is a Caymanian footballer who plays as a defender. He has represented the Cayman Islands national team during the 2010 Caribbean Championship and World Cup qualifying matches in 2008 and 2011.

He was one of a group of Caymanian players identified by the country's football federation who they believed would benefit from playing overseas. He joined Ashford Town (Middlesex) in England after being invited over in late 2010 on an initial short term basis, although the move was extended then until the end of the season. He made one first-team appearance for the club as a substitute.
