= Jonathan Reguero =

Spanish footballer

Personal information
- Full name: Jonathan Reguero Segura
- Date of birth: 19 March 1989 (age 37)
- Place of birth: Vitoria-Gasteiz, Spain
- Height: 1.83 m (6 ft 0 in)
- Position: Forward

Youth career
- Aurrerá
- Alavés

Senior career*
Years	Team	Apps	(Gls)
2007–2009	Alavés B	46	(17)
2009–2010	Alavés	20	(1)
2010–2011	Bilbao Athletic	20	(1)
2011–2012	Leioa	28	(4)
2012–2013	Marino	11	(4)
2013–2014	Coruxo	34	(5)
2014–2015	Leioa	33	(2)
- * Club domestic league appearances and goals

Jonathan Reguero Segura (born 19 March 1989) is a Spanish former footballer who played as a forward.

== Club career ==
Born in Vitoria-Gasteiz, Basque Country, Reguero finished his graduation with Deportivo Alavés' youth setup, and made his senior debuts with the reserves in the 2007–08 season, in Tercera División. On 24 January 2009 he made his first-team debut, coming on as a second-half substitute in a 0–2 home loss against Albacete Balompié in the Segunda División.

In the 2009 summer Reguero was definitely promoted to the main squad, now in Segunda División B. He subsequently went on to resume his career in the same division but also in the fourth level, representing Bilbao Athletic, SD Leioa (two stints), Club Marino de Luanco and Coruxo FC.
