= Gerardo Mendoza =

Venezuelan footballer (1989–2019)

Personal information
- Full name: Gerardo José Mendoza
- Date of birth: 3 January 1989
- Place of birth: Valera, Venezuela
- Date of death: 18 July 2019 (aged 30)
- Place of death: Hospital Dr. Pedro Emilio Carrillo, Trujillo, Venezuela
- Height: 1.68 m (5 ft 6 in)
- Position: Midfielder

Senior career*
Years	Team	Apps	(Gls)
2010–2016	Trujillanos	112	(3)
2017	Portuguesa	25	(0)
2019	Yaracuyanos		
Total		137	(3)
- * Club domestic league appearances and goals

Gerardo José Mendoza (3 January 1989 – 18 July 2019) was a Venezuelan footballer who played as a midfielder. He was killed in a robbery at his home in Trujillo, Venezuela, in 2019.

== Career statistics ==
=== Club ===
Club	Season	League			Cup		Continental		Other		Total	
Club	Season	Division	Apps	Goals	Apps	Goals	Apps	Goals	Apps	Goals	Apps	Goals
Trujillanos	2010–11	Venezuelan Primera División	8	0	0	0	1 (Note: Appearances in the Copa Sudamericana)	0	0	0	9	0
Trujillanos	2011–12	Venezuelan Primera División	21	2	0	0	–		0	0	21	2
Trujillanos	2012–13	Venezuelan Primera División	17	0	0	0	–		0	0	17	0
Trujillanos	2013–14	Venezuelan Primera División	12	1	0	0	2	0	0	0	14	1
Trujillanos	2014–15	Venezuelan Primera División	23	0	0	0	2	0	0	0	25	0
Trujillanos	2015	Venezuelan Primera División	9	0	0	0	–		0	0	9	0
Trujillanos	2016	Venezuelan Primera División	22	0	0	0	5 (Note: Appearances in the Copa Libertadores)	0	0	0	27	0
Trujillanos	Total		112	3	0	0	10	0	0	0	122	3
Portuguesa	2017	Venezuelan Primera División	25	0	0	0	–		0	0	1	0
Career total			137	3	0	0	10	0	0	0	147	3
