= Niklas Hartmann =

German footballer

Personal information
- Date of birth: 9 December 1989 (age 36)
- Place of birth: Hann. Münden, West Germany
- Height: 1.85 m (6 ft 1 in)
- Position: Goalkeeper

Team information
- Current team: Hessen Kassel
- Number: 39

Youth career
- SG Reinhardshagen
- KSV Hessen Kassel
- –2009: Arminia Bielefeld

Senior career*
Years	Team	Apps	(Gls)
2008–2011	Arminia Bielefeld II	45	(0)
2009–2011	Arminia Bielefeld	1	(0)
2011–2014	Rot-Weiß Oberhausen	18	(0)
2013	→ Rot-Weiß Oberhausen II	1	(0)
2014–2015	KSV Baunatal	27	(0)
2015–	Hessen Kassel	113	(0)
2016	→ Hessen Kassel II	1	(0)
- * Club domestic league appearances and goals as of 27 October 2020

Niklas Hartmann (born 9 December 1989) is a German footballer who plays for Hessen Kassel.
