= 1989 Campeonato da 1ª Divisão do Futebol =

Campeonato da 1ª Divisão do Futebol
- Season: 1989
- Champions: Hap Kuan

Statistics of Campeonato da 1ª Divisão do Futebol in the 1989 season.

== Overview ==
Hap Kuan won the championship.
