= Joan Darome =

Indonesian footballer

Personal information
- Full name: Joan Darome
- Date of birth: 15 October 1989 (age 37)
- Place of birth: Indonesia
- Height: 1.65 m (5 ft 5 in)
- Position: Defender

Senior career*
Years	Team	Apps	(Gls)
2011–2015	Persiram Raja Ampat	67	(6)
- * Club domestic league appearances and goals

Joan Darome (born October 15, 1989) is an Indonesian former footballer.

== Club statistics ==
Club	Season	Super League		Premier Division		Piala Indonesia		Total	
Club	Season	Apps	Goals	Apps	Goals	Apps	Goals	Apps	Goals
Persiram Raja Ampat	2011–12	5	0	-		-		5	0
Total		5	0	-		-		5	0
