= Jens Bodemer =

German footballer and manager (born 1989)

Personal information
- Full name: Jens Bodemer
- Date of birth: 20 January 1989 (age 37)
- Place of birth: Karlsruhe, West Germany
- Height: 1.87 m (6 ft 2 in)
- Position: Goalkeeper

Youth career
- –1999: SV Hagenbach
- 1999–2008: Karlsruher SC

Senior career*
| Years | Team | Apps | (Gls) |
| 2008–2009 | Karlsruher SC II | 0 | (0) |
| 2009–2010 | 1. FC Heidenheim | 5 | (0) |
| 2010–2015 | Viktoria Herxheim | 5 | (1) |
| 2016–2017 | SV Burbach | 20 | (0) |
| Total | | 30 | (1) |

Managerial career
- 2015: Viktoria Herxheim (player-manager)
- 2018–: Fortuna Billigheim-Ingenheim
- * Club domestic league appearances and goals

Jens Bodemer (born 20 January 1989) is a German former footballer who played as a goalkeeper, and current manager of Fortuna Billigheim-Ingenheim.

== Playing career ==
Bodemer made his professional debut for 1. FC Heidenheim in the 3. Liga on 21 November 2009, starting in the home match against Carl Zeiss Jena, which finished as a 3–1 win.

== Managerial career ==
In 2015, Bodemer was appointed as player-manager of Viktoria Herxheim, before being sacked later that year. In 2018, he was appointed as manager of Fortuna Billigheim-Ingenheim.
