= Steven Ehricks =

Puerto Rican international soccer player

Steven Ehrichs
Personal information
- Full name: Steven Ehrichs Colón
- Date of birth: September 11, 1989 (age 37)
- Place of birth: Brentwood, New York, United States
- Height: 1.89 m (6 ft 2 in)
- Positions: Defender; midfielder

Youth career
- 2014: Port Jefferson SC

College career
Years	Team	Apps	(Gls)
2007–2010	Hofstra Pride	66	(4)

Senior career*
Years	Team	Apps	(Gls)
2013–2014	Mineola Portuguese		(2+)
2014–2016	Port Jefferson SC		

International career
2008–2010	Puerto Rico U20		
2008–2010	Puerto Rico	3	(0)
- * Club domestic league appearances and goals

Steven Ehrichs Colón (born September 11, 1989) is a retired footballer who played as a defender or midfielder.

A native of Brentwood, New York, Ehrichs graduated from Brentwood High School. He played four years of college soccer at Hofstra, scoring four goals in 66 appearances for the Pride. After college, he appeared for three seasons in the Long Island Soccer Football League (LISFL), playing with Mineola Portuguese and Port Jefferson SC. Ehrichs represented Puerto Rico at the international level, earning three caps for the senior side including starting in two 2010 World Cup Qualifying matches against Honduras. He also played in a 2010 Caribbean Cup qualification match against Cayman Islands.
