= Edgar Urquizo =

Mexican footballer and manager

Personal information
- Full name: Edgar Urquizo Olivares
- Date of birth: 21 August 1987 (age 39)
- Place of birth: Matamoros, Coahuila, Mexico
- Height: 1.65 m (5 ft 5 in)
- Position: Midfielder

Team information
- Current team: Santos Laguna U-19 (Assistant)

Senior career*
Years	Team	Apps	(Gls)
2006–2007	Santos Laguna 'A'	4	(0)
2007–2010	Bravos de Nuevo Laredo	21	(1)

Managerial career
- 2009: Toros Laguna (Assistant)
- 2010: Aztecas Arandas (Assistant)
- 2011–2012: FC Toros (Assistant)
- 2013–2015: Bravos de Nuevo Laredo
- 2015–2018: Santos Laguna Reserves and Academy
- 2019: Santos Laguna (women) (Assistant)
- 2021–: Santos Laguna Reserves and Academy
- * Club domestic league appearances and goals

Edgar Urquizo Olivares (born January 25, 1989) is a Mexican football manager and former player.
