= April Hadi =

Indonesian footballer

Personal information
- Full name: April Hadi
- Date of birth: 10 April 1981 (age 45)
- Place of birth: Kuantan Singingi, Indonesia
- Height: 1.70 m (5 ft 7 in)
- Positions: Winger; full-back

Senior career*
Years	Team	Apps	(Gls)
2006–2014	PSPS Riau	180	(22)
2014–2015	Persija Jakarta	17	(1)
2016–2017	PSPS Riau	21	(0)
2017–2018	Gresik United	15	(5)
- * Club domestic league appearances and goals as of 18 April 2014

April Hadi (born April 10, 1981) is an Indonesian former footballer.
