= Benjamin Stebbings =

English cricketer

Personal information
- Full name: Benjamin Robert William Stebbings
- Born: 4 October 1989 (age 37); Oxford, Oxfordshire, England
- Batting: Right-handed
- Bowling: Right-arm medium

Domestic team information
- Years: Team
- 2010–2011: Oxford MCCU
- 2007–present: Herefordshire

Career statistics
Competition	First-class
Matches	4
Runs scored	90
Batting average	6.00
100s/50s	–/–
Top score	29
Balls bowled	–
Wickets	–
Bowling average	–
5 wickets in innings	–
10 wickets in match	–
Best bowling	–
Catches/stumpings	2/–
- Source: Cricinfo, 22 August 2011

Benjamin Robert William Stebbings (born 4 October 1989) is an English cricketer. Stebbings is a right-handed batsman who bowls right-arm medium pace. He was born in Oxford, Oxfordshire.

While studying for his degree at Oxford Brookes, Stebbings made his first-class debut for Oxford MCCU against Northamptonshire in 2010. He made three further first-class appearance for the team, the last of which came against Nottinghamshire in 2011. In four matches, he scored 90 runs at an average of 6.00, with a high score of 29.

Prior to his studies, Stebbings had made his debut in Minor counties cricket for Herefordshire against Shropshire in the 2007 MCCA Knockout Trophy. He continues to play for Herefordshire.
