= Victory Yendra =

Indonesian footballer

Victoryendra
Personal information
- Full name: Victory Yendra
- Date of birth: 10 September 1989 (age 37)
- Place of birth: Kuantan Singingi, Riau, Indonesia
- Height: 1.72 m (5 ft 7 1/2 in)
- Position: Striker

Youth career
- 2006–2008: PS Kuansing
- 2009–2010: PSPS U-21

Senior career*
Years	Team	Apps	(Gls)
2008–2009	PS Kuansing	21	(3)
2010–2012	PSPS Pekanbaru	15	(1)
2013–2015	Persih Tembilahan	32	(11)
- * Club domestic league appearances and goals as of 11 July 2012

Victory Yendra (born September 10, 1989 in Kuantan Singingi Regency) is an Indonesian former footballer who plays as a striker.

== Club statistics ==
Club	Season	Super League		Premier Division		Piala Indonesia		Total	
Club	Season	Apps	Goals	Apps	Goals	Apps	Goals	Apps	Goals
PSPS Pekanbaru	2010-11	6	1	-		-		6	1
PSPS Pekanbaru	2011-12	9	0	-		-		9	0
Total		15	1	-		-		15	1
