= 2009–10 Arema Indonesia season =

Arema Indonesia
2009–10 season
- Manager: Mujiono Mujito
- Head coach: Robert Alberts
- Stadium: Kanjuruhan Stadium
- ISL: 1st
- Piala Indonesia: Runners-up
- Top goalscorer: League: Roman Chmelo; Noh Alam Shah (14 goals); All: Roman Chmelo; Noh Alam Shah (15 goals)
Home colours

The 2009–10 Arema Indonesia season is Arema's 23rd competitive season. The club will compete in Indonesia Super League and Piala Indonesia. Arema Indonesia a professional football club based in Malang, East Java, Indonesia. The season covers the period from 1 July 2009 to 1 August 2010.

== Coaching staff ==
Position	Name
Head coach	(Netherlands) Robert Alberts
Assistant coach	(Indonesia) Joko Susilo
Assistant coach	(Indonesia) Liestiadi
Goalkeeper coach	(Indonesia) Dwi Sasmianto

== Squad information ==
=== First-team squad ===
Note: Flags indicate national team as defined under FIFA eligibility rules; some limited exceptions apply. Players may hold more than one non-FIFA nationality.

No.	Pos.	Nation	Player
1	GK	IDN	Kurnia Meiga
2	DF	IDN	Purwaka Yudhi
3	DF	IDN	Zulkifli Syukur
4	MF	IDN	Jalaluddin Main
5	MF	IDN	Fakhrudin
6	MF	SGP	Muhammad Ridhuan
7	DF	IDN	Benny Wahyudi
8	MF	IDN	Fariz Bagus Dhinata
9	FW	SVK	Roman Chmelo
10	MF	IDN	Ronny Firmansyah
11	MF	IDN	Tommy Pranata
12	FW	SGP	Noh Alam Shah
14	FW	IDN	Rachmat Afandi
15	FW	IDN	Sunarto

No.	Pos.	Nation	Player
17	MF	URU	Esteban Guillén
19	MF	IDN	Ahmad Bustomi
20	DF	IDN	Johan Alfarizi
21	DF	IDN	Irfan Raditya
23	FW	IDN	Gherry Setya
24	DF	CMR	Pierre Njanka (captain)
27	DF	IDN	Waluyo
30	DF	IDN	Hermawan
37	MF	IDN	Juan Revi
39	MF	IDN	Firmansyah Aprillianto
41	FW	IDN	Dendi Santoso
45	GK	IDN	Aji Saka
82	GK	IDN	Iswan Karim

=== Transfers ===
In: Note: Flags indicate national team as defined under FIFA eligibility rules; some limited exceptions apply. Players may hold more than one non-FIFA nationality.

No.	Pos.	Nation	Player
50	GK	IDN	Markus Haris Maulana (from (Indonesia) PSMS Medan)
2	DF	IDN	Purwaka Yudhi (from (Indonesia) Deltras Sidoarjo)
21	DF	IDN	Irfan Raditya (from (Indonesia) PSDS Deli Serdang)
24	DF	CMR	Pierre Njanka (from (Indonesia) Persija Jakarta)
27	DF	IDN	Waluyo (from (Indonesia) Persib Bandung)
30	DF	IDN	Hermawan (from (Indonesia) Deltras Sidoarjo)
5	MF	IDN	Fakhrudin (from (Indonesia) Persisam Putra Samarinda)
6	MF	SGP	Muhammad Ridhuan (from (Singapore) Tampines Rovers)
9	MF	SVK	Roman Chmelo (from (Slovakia) Dunajská Streda)
11	MF	IDN	Tommy Pranata (from (Indonesia) Persisam Putra Samarinda)
18	MF	GAB	Landry Poulangoye (from (Malta) Pietà Hotspurs)
37	MF	IDN	Juan Revi (from (Indonesia) Deltras Sidoarjo)
39	MF	IDN	Firmansyah Aprillianto (from Youth sector)
82	GK	IDN	Iswan Karim (from Persigo Gorontalo)
17	MF	URU	Esteban Guillén (from (Indonesia) PSMS Medan)

Out: Note: Flags indicate national team as defined under FIFA eligibility rules; some limited exceptions apply. Players may hold more than one non-FIFA nationality.

No.	Pos.	Nation	Player
31	GK	IDN	Muhammad Yasir (to (Indonesia) Persija Jakarta)
32	GK	IDN	Dadang Sudrajat (to (Indonesia) Persikab Bandung)
2	DF	IDN	Alexander Pulalo (to (Indonesia) Semen Padang)
4	DF	IDN	Hendra Ridwan (to (Indonesia) Persipura Jayapura)
6	DF	IDN	Suroso (to (Indonesia) Persema Malang)
16	DF	IDN	Achmad Jufriyanto (to (Indonesia) Pelita Jaya)
24	DF	IDN	Richi Pravita Hari (to (Indonesia) Persekam Metro)
25	DF	IDN	Erik Setiawan (to (Indonesia) Persija Jakarta)
26	DF	GUI	Boubacar Keita (Released)
5	MF	IDN	Fandy Mochtar (to (Indonesia) Persisam Putra Samarinda)
7	MF	IDN	Ranu Tri Sasongko (to (Indonesia) PSBI Blitar)
14	MF	IDN	Arif Suyono (to (Indonesia) Sriwijaya FC)
27	MF	IDN	Ahmad Sembiring (to (Indonesia) Persisam Putra Samarinda)
30	MF	IDN	Andry Lesmana Wibowo (unknown)
35	MF	IDN	Gigih May Siswantoro (unknown)
10	MF	NGR	Udo Fortune (to (Indonesia) Persikab Bandung)
11	FW	CHI	Patricio Morales (to (Chile) Lota Schwager)
26	FW	IDN	Ribut Wahyudi (unknown)
50	FW	LBR	Buston Nagbe Browne (unknown)
50	GK	IDN	Markus Haris Maulana (to (Indonesia) Persib Bandung)
18	MF	GAB	Landry Poulangoye (to (Indonesia) Aceh United)
-	FW	IDN	Muhammad Bahtiar (to (Indonesia) Bontang FC)

== Competitions ==
=== Overview ===
Competition	Record								Started round	Final position / round	First match	Last match
Competition	G	W	D	L	GF	GA	GD	Win %	Started round	Final position / round	First match	Last match
Indonesia Super League	34	23	4	7	57	22	+35	67.65	Matchday 1	1st	11 October 2009	30 May 2010
Piala Indonesia	10	8	0	2	18	5	+13	80.00	Group stage	Runners-up	16 April 2010	1 August 2010
Total	44	31	4	9	75	27	+48	70.45				

Updated to match played 1 August 2010
Source: Competitions

=== Indonesia Super League ===
==== League table ====
Pos	Team	Pld	W	D	L	GF	GA	GD	Pts	Qualification or relegation
1	Arema Indonesia (C)	34	23	4	7	57	22	+35	73	Qualification for the AFC Champions League group stage
2	Persipura	34	18	13	3	62	32	+30	67	Qualification for the AFC Cup group stage
3	Persiba	34	15	9	10	44	31	+13	54	
4	Persib	34	16	5	13	50	36	+14	53	
5	Persija	34	14	10	10	41	36	+5	52	

Updated to match(es) played on 5 June 2010. Source: Liga Indonesia
Rules for classification: 1) points; 2) goal difference; 3) number of goals scored.
(C) Champions

==== Results summary ====
Overall								Home						Away					
Pld	W	D	L	GF	GA	GD	Pts	W	D	L	GF	GA	GD	W	D	L	GF	GA	GD
34	23	4	7	57	22	+35	73	14	2	1	36	8	+28	9	2	6	21	14	+7

Last updated: 30 May 2010.

==== Results by round ====
Round	1	2	3	4	5	6	7	8	9	10	11	12	13	14	15	16	17	18	19	20	21	22	23	24	25	26	27	28	29	30	31	32	33	34
Ground	H	H	A	A	A	A	H	H	A	A	H	H	H	A	A	H	H	A	A	H	H	A	A	A	H	H	H	A	A	H	H	H	A	A
Result	W	D	W	W	D	W	W	W	W	L	D	W	W	L	W	L	W	W	L	W	W	W	L	L	W	W	W	W	L	W	W	W	D	W
Position	1	4	1	1	2	1	1	1	1	1	1	1	1	1	1	1	1	1	1	1	1	1	1	1	1	1	1	1	1	1	1	1	1	1
Points	3	4	6	9	10	13	16	19	22	22	23	26	29	29	32	32	35	38	39	42	45	48	48	48	51	54	57	60	60	63	66	69	70	73

Updated to match(es) played on 22 February 2026. Source:
A = Away; H = Home; W = Win; D = Draw; L = Loss; P = Postponed

==== Matches ====
Win Draw Loss

11 October 2009 1	Arema Indonesia	1–0	Persija Jakarta	Malang, East Java
15:30 UTC+7	Fakhrudin 53'	Report		Stadium: Kanjuruhan Stadium; Attendance: 35,000; Referee: Najamuddin Aspiran

14 October 2009 2	Arema Indonesia	0–0	PSPS Pekanbaru	Malang, East Java
15:30 UTC+7		Report		Stadium: Kanjuruhan Stadium; Attendance: 25,000; Referee: Fiator Ambarita

22 October 2009 3	Bontang FC	1–2	Arema Indonesia	Bontang, East Kalimantan
18:15 UTC+7	Maldonado 17'	(Report)	Alam Shah 39', 57'	Stadium: Mulawarman Stadium; Attendance: 10,500; Referee: Oki Dwi Putra

25 October 2009 4	Persisam Putra Samarinda	0–1	Arema Indonesia	Samarinda, East Kalimantan
14:30 UTC+7		(Report)	Chmelo 81'	Stadium: Palaran Stadium; Attendance: 10,000; Referee: Jimmy Napitupulu

28 November 2009 5	Persitara Jakarta Utara	0–0	Arema Indonesia	North Jakarta, DKI Jakarta
15:30 UTC+7		(Report)		Stadium: Soemantri Brodjonegoro Stadium; Attendance: 4,250; Referee: Aeng Suarlan

2 December 2009 6	Pelita Jaya	0–2	Arema Indonesia	Karawang, West Java
15:30 UTC+7		(Report)	Chmelo 4'; Afandi 84'	Stadium: Singaperbangsa Stadium; Attendance: 8,000; Referee: Armando Pribadi

6 December 2009 7	Arema Indonesia	1–0	Persiwa Wamena	Malang, East Java
15:30 UTC+7	Alam Shah 10' (pen.)	(Report)		Stadium: Kanjuruhan Stadium; Attendance: 25,000; Referee: Yandri

9 December 2009 8	Arema Indonesia	2–1	Persipura Jayapura	Malang, East Java
15:30 UTC+7	Fakhrudin 40', 65'	(Report)	Rumere 72'	Stadium: Kanjuruhan Stadium; Attendance: 30,000; Referee: Sapari

12 December 2009 9	Persijap Jepara	0–1	Arema Indonesia	Jepara, Central Java
15:30 UTC+7		(Report)	Alam Shah 40' (pen.)	Stadium: Gelora Bumi Kartini Stadium; Attendance: 7,000; Referee: Jerry Elly

16 December 2009 10	Persela Lamongan	1–0	Arema Indonesia	Lamongan, East Java
19:00 UTC+7	Samsul 12'	(Report)		Stadium: Surajaya Stadium; Attendance: 7,612; Referee: Najamuddin Aspiran

19 December 2009 11	Arema Indonesia	0–0	Persib Bandung	Malang, East Java
18:15 UTC+7		(Report)		Stadium: Kanjuruhan Stadium; Attendance: 0 Referee: Yandri

23 December 2009 12	Arema Indonesia	3–0	Sriwijaya FC	Malang, East Java
15:30 UTC+7	Njanka 5'; Fakhrudin 56'; Chmelo 60'	Report		Stadium: Kanjuruhan Stadium; Attendance: 35,000; Referee: Oleh Hadi

10 January 2010 13	Arema Indonesia	3–1	Persema Malang	Malang, East Java
19:00 UTC+7	Alam Shah 20', 83'; Fakhrudin 33'	Report	Jairon 16'	Stadium: Kanjuruhan Stadium; Attendance: 35,000; Referee: Jimmy Napitupulu

16 January 2010 14	Persebaya Surabaya	2–0	Arema Indonesia	Surabaya, East Java
15:30 UTC+7	Taufiq 29'; Oddang 41'	Report		Stadium: Gelora 10 November Stadium; Attendance: 29,000; Referee: Aeng Suarlan

20 January 2010 15	Persik Kediri	0–1	Arema Indonesia	Lamongan, East Java
17:00 UTC+7		Report	Alam Shah 72'	Stadium: Surajaya Stadium; Attendance: 11,700; Referee: Fiator Ambarita

24 January 2010 16	Arema Indonesia	1–2	Persiba Balikpapan	Malang, East Java
15:30 UTC+7	Dendi 87'	Report	Ariawan 72', 77'	Stadium: Kanjuruhan Stadium; Attendance: 35,000; Referee: Fiator Ambarita

27 January 2010 17	Arema Indonesia	3–0	PSM Makassar	Malang, East Java
15:30 UTC+7	Chmelo 4'; Alam Shah 39'; Fakhrudin 90'	Report		Stadium: Kanjuruhan Stadium; Attendance: 25,000; Referee: M. Safei

10 February 2010 18	PSM Makassar	0–2	Arema Indonesia	Makassar, South Sulawesi
19:30 UTC+7		Report	Kujiro 19' (o.g.); Chmelo 74'	Stadium: Mattoangin Stadium; Attendance: 14,250; Referee: Jimmy Napitupulu

14 February 2010 19	Persiba Balikpapan	1–0	Arema Indonesia	Balikpapan, East Kalimantan
15:30 UTC+7	Ariawan 39'	Report		Stadium: Balikpapan Stadium; Attendance: 6,500; Referee: Aeng Suarlan

18 February 2010 20	Arema Indonesia	3–0	Persik Kediri	Malang, East Java
15:30 UTC+7	Alam Shah 23'; Chmelo 83'; Njanka 90' (pen.)	Report		Stadium: Kanjuruhan Stadium; Attendance: 25,000; Referee: Armando Pribadi

21 February 2010 21	Arema Indonesia	1–0	Persebaya Surabaya	Malang, East Java
19:00 UTC+7	Njanka 90' (pen.)	Report		Stadium: Kanjuruhan Stadium; Attendance: 35,000; Referee: Olehadi

9 March 2010 22	Persema Malang	1–3	Arema Indonesia	Malang, East Java
15:30 UTC+7	Siswanto 15'	Report	Guillén 33'; Chmelo 57'; Ridhuan 77'	Stadium: Gajayana Stadium; Attendance: 15,000; Referee: Setiono

14 March 2010 23	Persib Bandung	1–0	Arema Indonesia	Bandung, West Java
19:00 UTC+7	Gonzáles 63'	Report		Stadium: Si Jalak Harupat Stadium; Attendance: 30,000; Referee: Jimmy Napitupulu

20 March 2010 24	Sriwijaya FC	1–0	Arema Indonesia	Palembang, South Sumatera
15:30 UTC+7	Kayamba 64'	Report		Stadium: Jakabaring Stadium; Attendance: 14,029; Referee: Aeng Suarlan

24 March 2010 25	Arema Indonesia	3–1	Persijap Jepara	Malang, East Java
15:30 UTC+7	Guillén 2'; Chmelo 37', 46'	Report	Iswanto 64'	Stadium: Kanjuruhan Stadium; Attendance: 18,661; Referee: Fiator Ambarita

30 March 2010 26	Arema Indonesia	2–0	Persitara Jakarta Utara	Malang, East Java
15:30 UTC+7	Ridhuan 35'; Dendi 70'	Report		Stadium: Kanjuruhan Stadium; Attendance: 33,693; Referee: Oki Dwi Putra

3 April 2010 27	Arema Indonesia	6–1	Pelita Jaya	Malang, East Java
19:00 UTC+7	Alam Shah 15', 42', 54'; Fakhrudin 25', 49'; Ridhuan 87'	Report	Vizcarra 74'	Stadium: Kanjuruhan Stadium; Referee: Armando Pribadi

11 April 2010 28	Persiwa Wamena	0–2	Arema Indonesia	Wamena, Papua
18:30 UTC+7		Report	Ridhuan 75'; Chmelo 80'	Stadium: Pendidikan Stadium; Attendance: 10,000; Referee: Sapari

24 April 2010 29	Persipura Jayapura	4–1	Arema Indonesia	Jayapura, Papua
15:30 UTC+7	Boaz 16', 84'; Ortizan 57'; Bonsapia 75'	Report	Njanka 18'	Stadium: Mandala Stadium; Attendance: 22,546; Referee: Aeng Suarlan

4 May 2010 30	Arema Indonesia	2–1	Persela Lamongan	Malang, East Java
15:30 UTC+7	Chmelo 59', 61'	Report	Samsul 45'	Stadium: Kanjuruhan Stadium; Attendance: 32,454; Referee: Oki Dwi Putra

16 May 2010 31	Arema Indonesia	2–1	Persisam Putra Samarinda	Malang, East Java
15:30 UTC+7	Njanka 45+2'; Afandi 90'	Report	Thonkanya 25'	Stadium: Kanjuruhan Stadium; Referee: Jimmy Napitupulu

19 May 2010 32	Arema Indonesia	3–0	Bontang FC	Malang, East Java
15:30 UTC+7	Guillén 14'; Ridhuan 90'; Bustomi 90+4'	Report		Stadium: Kanjuruhan Stadium; Attendance: 33,200; Referee: Armando Pribadi

26 May 2010 33	PSPS Pekanbaru	1–1	Arema Indonesia	Pekanbaru, Riau
	Dzumafo 47' (pen.)		Alam Shah 41'	Stadium: Kaharudin Nasution Stadium; Referee: Ahmad Suparman

30 May 2010 34	Persija Jakarta	1–5	Arema Indonesia	Central Jakarta, DKI Jakarta
15:30 UTC+7	Bambang 60'	Report	Guillén 8'; Njanka 45' (pen.); Chmelo 66', 75'; Alam Shah 70'	Stadium: Gelora Bung Karno Stadium; Attendance: 85,000; Referee: Oki Dwi Putra

=== Piala Indonesia ===
==== Group stage ====
Team	Pld	W	D	L	GF	GA	GD	Pts
Arema Indonesia	3	3	0	0	6	1	+5	9
PSMP Mojokerto	3	2	0	1	5	4	+1	6
Persijap Jepara	3	1	0	2	2	5	−3	3
Deltras Sidoarjo	3	0	0	3	3	6	−3	0

15 April 2010 Group stage	Arema Indonesia	3–0	Persijap Jepara	Malang, East Java
18:30 UTC+7	Chmelo 36'; Dendi 43'; Ronny 90'	(Report)		Stadium: Kanjuruhan Stadium; Attendance: 28,878; Referee: Jimmy Napitupulu

17 April 2010 Group stage	Arema Indonesia	1–0	Deltras Sidoarjo	Malang, East Java
19:00 UTC+7	Alam Shah 53' (pen.)	(Report)		Stadium: Kanjuruhan Stadium; Attendance: 32,552; Referee: Muhammad Agus

20 April 2010 Group stage	PS Mojokerto Putra	1–2	Arema Indonesia	Malang, East Java
15:30 UTC+7	Fadli 37'	(Report)	Sunarto 44'; Tommy P. 65'	Stadium: Kanjuruhan Stadium; Attendance: 23,250; Referee: Oki Dwi Putra

==== Round of 16 ====
Team	Pld	W	D	L	GF	GA	GD	Pts
Arema Indonesia	3	3	0	0	4	0	+4	9
Pelita Jaya	3	1	1	1	2	3	−1	4
Persidafon Dafonsoro	3	1	0	2	3	4	−1	3
Persela Lamongan	3	0	1	2	3	5	−2	1

7 May 2010 Round of 16	Arema Indonesia	2–0	Pelita Jaya	Malang, East Java
15:30 UTC+7	Afandi 72'; Dendi 90'	(Report)		Stadium: Kanjuruhan Stadium; Attendance: 15,322; Referee: Olehadi

9 May 2010 Round of 16	Persidafon Jayapura	0–1	Arema Indonesia	Malang, East Java
15:30 UTC+7		(Report)	Dendi 72'	Stadium: Kanjuruhan Stadium; Attendance: 32,398; Referee: Sapari

12 May 2010 Round of 16	Arema Indonesia	1–0	Persela Lamongan	Malang, East Java
15:30 UTC+7	Fakhrudin 75'	(Report)		Stadium: Kanjuruhan Stadium; Attendance: 10,762; Referee: Jerry Elly

=== Knockout phase ===
18 July 2010 Quarter-finals 1st leg	Arema Indonesia	3–0	Persib Bandung	Malang, East Java
15:30 UTC+7	Afandi 58'; Njanka 69' (pen.); Dendi 70'	(Report)		Stadium: Kanjuruhan Stadium; Attendance: 21,955; Referee: Jimmy Napitupulu

22 July 2010 Quarter-finals 2nd leg	Persib Bandung	2–0 (2–3 agg.)	Arema Indonesia	Bandung, West Java
15:30 UTC+7	Martinez 26', 76'	(Report)		Stadium: Si Jalak Harupat Stadium; Attendance: 0 Referee: Olehadi

28 July 2010 Semi-finals	Persik Kediri	0–4	Arema Indonesia	Sidoarjo, East Java
20:00 UTC+7		(Report)	Irfan 47'; Ridhuan 51'; Fakhrudin 82'; Afandi 88'	Stadium: Gelora Delta Stadium; Attendance: 22,537; Referee: Oki Dwi Putra

1 August 2010 Final	Sriwijaya FC	2–1	Arema Indonesia	Solo, Central Java
20:00 UTC+7	Kayamba 47'; Solomin 80'	(Report)	Ridhuan 72'	Stadium: Manahan Stadium; Attendance: 30,000; Referee: Jimmy Napitupulu

== Statistics ==
=== Squad appearances and goals ===
No.	Pos	Nat	Player	Total		ISL		Piala Indonesia	
No.	Pos	Nat	Player	Apps	Goals	Apps	Goals	Apps	Goals
Goalkeepers
1	GK	(Indonesia) IDN	Kurnia Meiga	31	0	24	0	7	0
45	GK	(Indonesia) IDN	Aji Saka	1	0	0	0	1	0
82	GK	(Indonesia) IDN	Iswan Karim	3	0	1	0	2	0
Defenders
2	DF	(Indonesia) IDN	Purwaka Yudhi	22	0	18	0	4	0
3	DF	(Indonesia) IDN	Zulkifli Syukur	33	0	25	0	8	0
7	DF	(Indonesia) IDN	Benny Wahyudi	36	0	29	0	7	0
20	DF	(Indonesia) IDN	Johan Alfarizi	1	0	0	0	1	0
21	DF	(Indonesia) IDN	Irfan Raditya	23	1	18	0	5	1
24	DF	(Cameroon) CMR	Pierre Njanka	37	7	31	6	6	1
27	DF	(Indonesia) IDN	Waluyo	18	0	11	0	7	0
30	DF	(Indonesia) IDN	Hermawan	16	0	10	0	6	0
Midfielders
4	MF	(Indonesia) IDN	Jalaluddin Main	5	0	2	0	3	0
5	MF	(Indonesia) IDN	Fakhrudin	41	10	32	8	9	2
6	MF	(Singapore) SGP	Muhammad Ridhuan	40	7	34	5	6	2
8	MF	(Indonesia) IDN	Fariz Bagus Dhinata	1	0	0	0	1	0
9	MF	(Slovakia) SVK	Roman Chmelo	38	15	32	14	6	1
10	MF	(Indonesia) IDN	Ronny Firmansyah	31	1	22	0	9	1
11	MF	(Indonesia) IDN	Tommy Pranata	19	1	14	0	5	1
17	MF	(Uruguay) URU	Esteban Guillén	19	4	16	4	3	0
19	MF	(Indonesia) IDN	Ahmad Bustomi	40	1	32	1	8	0
37	MF	(Indonesia) IDN	Juan Revi	28	0	21	0	7	0
39	MF	(Indonesia) IDN	Firmansyah Aprilianto	2	0	0	0	2	0
Forwards
12	FW	(Singapore) SGP	Noh Alam Shah	35	15	30	14	5	1
14	FW	(Indonesia) IDN	Rachmat Afandi	32	5	23	2	9	3
15	FW	(Indonesia) IDN	Sunarto	2	1	0	0	2	1
23	FW	(Indonesia) IDN	Gherry Setya	3	0	3	0	0	0
41	FW	(Indonesia) IDN	Dendi Santoso	28	6	19	2	9	4
Players transferred out during the season
50	GK	(Indonesia) IDN	Markus Haris Maulana	9	0	9	0	0	0
18	MF	(Gabon) GAB	Landry Poulangoye	11	0	11	0	0	0

=== Top scorers ===
The list is sorted by shirt number when total goals are equal.

Rnk	Pos	No.	Player	ISL	Piala Indonesia	Total
1	FW	9	(Slovakia) Roman Chmelo	14	1	15
1	FW	12	(Singapore) Noh Alam Shah	14	1	15
3	MF	5	(Indonesia) Fakhrudin	8	2	10
4	MF	6	(Singapore) Muhammad Ridhuan	5	2	7
4	DF	24	(Cameroon) Pierre Njanka	6	1	7
6	FW	41	(Indonesia) Dendi Santoso	2	4	6
7	FW	14	(Indonesia) Rachmat Afandi	2	3	5
8	MF	17	(Uruguay) Esteban Guillén	4	0	4
9	MF	10	(Indonesia) Ronny Firmansyah	0	1	1
9	MF	11	(Indonesia) Tommy Pranata	0	1	1
9	FW	15	(Indonesia) Sunarto	0	1	1
9	MF	19	(Indonesia) Ahmad Bustomi	1	0	1
9	DF	21	(Indonesia) Irfan Raditya	0	1	1
Own goals				1	0	1
Total				57	18	75
