= 2010 Piala Indonesia final =

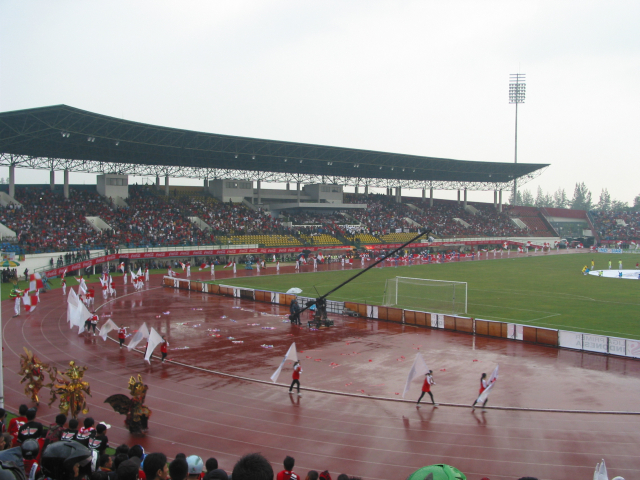
- The final was played at Manahan Stadium.
- Event: 2010 Piala Indonesia
Sriwijaya FC	Arema Indonesia
2	1
- Date: 1 August 2010
- Venue: Manahan Stadium, Solo
- Man of the Match: Keith Gumbs (Sriwijaya FC)
- Referee: Jimmy Napitupulu
- Attendance: 30,000
- Weather: Rainy

The 2010 Piala Indonesia final was a football match that took place on 1 August 2010 at Manahan Stadium in Solo. It was the fifth final of Piala Indonesia and contested by Sriwijaya FC and Arema Indonesia. It was a third successive Piala Indonesia final for Sriwijaya, and Arema's third overall having won their last two finals in 2005 and 2006.

Sriwijaya won the match 2–1 to claim their third consecutive Piala Indonesia title and entry to the 2011 AFC Champions League qualifying play-off.

== Road to the final ==
Note: In all results below, the score of the finalist is given first (H: home; A: away).

Sriwijaya FC				Round	Arema Indonesia			
Main article: 2010 Piala Indonesia first group stage: Group A: Team / Pld / W / D / L / GF / GA / GD / Pts; Sriwijaya FC / 3 / 2 / 1 / 0 / 7 / 2 / +5 / 7; Persikabo Bogor / 3 / 2 / 0 / 1 / 6 / 4 / +2 / 6; PSPS Pekanbaru / 3 / 0 / 2 / 1 / 1 / 3 / −2 / 2; Semen Padang / 3 / 0 / 1 / 2 / 1 / 6 / −5 / 1				First group stage	Main article: 2010 Piala Indonesia first group stage: Group E: Team / Pld / W / D / L / GF / GA / GD / Pts; Arema / 3 / 3 / 0 / 0 / 6 / 1 / +5 / 9; PSMP Mojokerto / 3 / 2 / 0 / 1 / 5 / 4 / +1 / 6; Persijap Jepara / 3 / 1 / 0 / 2 / 2 / 5 / −3 / 3; Deltras Sidoarjo / 3 / 0 / 0 / 3 / 3 / 6 / −3 / 0			
Main article: 2010 Piala Indonesia second group stage: Group 9: Team / Pld / W / D / L / GF / GA / GD / Pts; Persija Jakarta / 3 / 2 / 1 / 0 / 5 / 0 / +5 / 7; Sriwijaya FC / 3 / 1 / 2 / 0 / 12 / 2 / +10 / 5; Persisam Samarinda / 3 / 1 / 1 / 1 / 9 / 5 / +4 / 4; PSMP Mojokerto / 3 / 0 / 0 / 3 / 2 / 21 / −19 / 0				Second group stage	Main article: 2010 Piala Indonesia second group stage: Group 11: Team / Pld / W / D / L / GF / GA / GD / Pts; Arema / 3 / 3 / 0 / 0 / 4 / 0 / +4 / 9; Pelita Jaya / 3 / 1 / 1 / 1 / 2 / 3 / −1 / 4; Persidafon Jayapura / 3 / 1 / 0 / 2 / 3 / 4 / −1 / 3; Persela Lamongan / 3 / 0 / 1 / 2 / 3 / 5 / −2 / 1			
Opponent	Agg.	1st leg	2nd leg	Knockout stage	Opponent	Agg.	1st leg	2nd leg
Persebaya Surabaya	2–1	2–0 (H)	0–1 (A)	Quarter-finals	Persib Bandung	3–2	3–0 (H)	0–2 (A)
Persipura Jayapura	2–2 (3–1 pen.) (A)			Semi-finals	Persik Kediri	4–0 (A)		

== Match details ==
1 August 2010
20:00 WIB

Sriwijaya FC	2–1	Arema Indonesia
Gumbs 47'; Solomin 80'	Report	Ridhuan 72'

Manahan Stadium, Solo
Attendance: 30,000
Referee: Jimmy Napitupulu

Sriwijaya FC	Arema Indonesia

GK	12	(Indonesia) Ferry Rotinsulu		(substituted off) 22'
CB	4	(Indonesia) Charis Yulianto (c)	(yellow card) 68'
CB	19	(Indonesia) Ambrizal
CB	20	(Singapore) Precious Emuejeraye
DM	6	(Indonesia) Tony Sucipto
CM	11	(Indonesia) Ponaryo Astaman
CM	10	(Liberia) Zah Rahan
RW	23	(Uzbekistan) Pavel Solomin		(substituted off) 90'
LW	9	(Nigeria) Anoure Obiora
SS	25	(Indonesia) Isnan Ali	(yellow card) 32'	(substituted off) 46'
CF	17	(Saint Kitts and Nevis) Keith Gumbs
Substitutes:
GK	34	(Indonesia) Hendro Kartiko		(substituted in) 22'
DF	5	(Indonesia) Bobby Satria
DF	7	(Indonesia) Mohammad Nasuha		(substituted in) 46'
DF	24	(Indonesia) Christian Warobay
MF	28	(Indonesia) Alamsyah Nasution		(substituted in) 90'
FW	8	(Indonesia) Rahmat Rivai
FW	14	(Indonesia) Arif Suyono
Manager:
(Indonesia) Rahmad Darmawan

GK	1	(Indonesia) Kurnia Meiga	(yellow card) 80'
RB	7	(Indonesia) Beny Wahyudi
CB	21	(Indonesia) Irfan Raditya		(substituted off) 82'
CB	27	(Indonesia) Waluyo
LB	3	(Indonesia) Zulkifli Syukur
RM	6	(Singapore) Muhammad Ridhuan	(yellow card) 45'
CM	19	(Indonesia) Ahmad Bustomi
CM	37	(Indonesia) Juan Revi	(yellow card) 16'	(substituted off) 90'
LM	9	(Slovakia) Roman Chmelo	(yellow card) 74'
SS	5	(Indonesia) Muhammad Fakhrudin		(substituted off) 67'
CF	12	(Singapore) Noh Alam Shah	(red card) 19'
Substitutes:
GK	45	(Indonesia) Aji Saka
DF	2	(Indonesia) Purwaka Yudhi
DF	30	(Indonesia) Hermawan
MF	10	(Indonesia) Ronny Firmansyah		(substituted in) 90'
MF	11	(Indonesia) Tommy Pranata
FW	14	(Indonesia) Rachmat Afandi		(substituted in) 82'
FW	41	(Indonesia) Dendi Santoso		(substituted in) 67'
Manager:
(Netherlands) Robert Alberts

Man of the Match: (Saint Kitts and Nevis) Keith Gumbs (Sriwijaya FC)
Assistant referees: Suadi Yunus, Ujang Suryana
Fourth official: Aeng Suarlan

== See also ==
- 2010 Piala Indonesia
