= 2010–11 Arema Indonesia season =

Arema Indonesia
2010–11 season
- President Director: M. Nur
- Head Coach: Miroslav Janů
- Stadium: Kanjuruhan Stadium
- Indonesia Super League: 2nd
- AFC Champions League: Group stage
- Indonesian Community Shield: Runners-up
- Top goalscorer: League: Roman Chmelo (10); All: Roman Chmelo (10)
- Highest home attendance: 36,994 (vs. Persipura Jayapura, 6 February 2011)
- Lowest home attendance: 14,054 (vs. Persisam Putra Samarinda, 15 June 2011)
- Average home league attendance: 25,450
| Home colours | Away colours |

The 2010–11 Arema Indonesia season was Arema Indonesia's 23rd competitive season. The club competed in the Indonesia Super League, AFC Champions League and Indonesian Community Shield. Arema Indonesia a professional football club based in Malang, East Java, Indonesia. The season covers the period from 1 July 2010 to 30 June 2011.

== Players ==
=== Current squad ===
Note: Flags indicate national team as defined under FIFA eligibility rules; some limited exceptions apply. Players may hold more than one non-FIFA nationality.

| No. | Pos. | Nation | Player |
|---|---|---|---|
| 1 | GK | IDN | Kurnia Meiga |
| 2 | DF | IDN | Purwaka Yudhi |
| 3 | DF | IDN | Zulkifli Syukur |
| 4 | DF | IDN | Hermawan |
| 5 | MF | IDN | Fakhrudin |
| 6 | MF | SGP | Muhammad Ridhuan |
| 7 | DF | IDN | Benny Wahyudi |
| 9 | MF | SVK | Roman Chmelo |
| 11 | MF | IDN | Tommy Pranata |
| 12 | FW | SGP | Noh Alam Shah (captain) |
| 14 | DF | IDN | Wahyu Gunawan |
| 15 | FW | IDN | Sunarto |
| 17 | MF | URU | Esteban Guillén |
| 18 | MF | IDN | Ronny Firmansyah |

| No. | Pos. | Nation | Player |
|---|---|---|---|
| 19 | MF | IDN | Ahmad Bustomi |
| 20 | DF | IDN | Johan Alfarizi |
| 22 | DF | IDN | Irfan Raditya |
| 23 | FW | IDN | Yongki Aribowo |
| 24 | DF | SVK | Roman Golian |
| 27 | DF | IDN | Waluyo |
| 29 | FW | IDN | Talaohu Musafri |
| 31 | GK | IDN | Achmad Kurniawan |
| 32 | DF | IDN | Leonard Tupamahu |
| 41 | FW | IDN | Dendi Santoso |
| 44 | DF | IDN | Hendra Ridwan |
| 45 | GK | IDN | Aji Saka |
| 77 | MF | IDN | Juan Revi |
| 99 | FW | IDN | Ahmad Amiruddin |

== Indonesian Community Shield ==
| Date | Opponents | H / A | Result F–A | Scorers | Attendance |
|---|---|---|---|---|---|
| 25 September 2010 | Sriwijaya | H | 1–3 | Njanka 78' (pen.) | 25,150 |

== Indonesia Super League ==
| Date | Opponents | H / A | Result F–A | Scorers | Attendance | League position |
|---|---|---|---|---|---|---|
| 29 September 2010 | Persisam | A | 1–2 | Njanka 78' (pen.) | 13,389 | 5th |
| 2 October 2010 | Bontang | A | 5–0 | Roman 8', Alam Shah (3) 14', 66', 90+1', M. Ridhuan 60' | 8,500 | 3rd |
| 20 October 2010 | Persijap | H | 2–0 | Guillen 17', M. Ridhuan 68' | 32,597 | 2nd |
| 24 October 2010 | Persela | A | 0–0 | | 9,034 | 2nd |
| 27 October 2010 | Deltras Sidoarjo | A | 1–1 | Njanka 15' | 19,232 | 2nd |
| 31 October 2010 | Semen Padang | H | 3–1 | Dendi 2', Yongki 12', Njanka 20' (pen.) | 10,396 | 2nd |
| 3 November 2010 | Pelita Jaya | H | 1–0 | Njanka 28' (pen.) | 24,510 | 2nd |
| 9 January 2011 | Persija | A | 1–2 | Roman 72' | 32,120 | 4th |
| 12 January 2011 | PSPS | A | 1–1 | Guillen 35' | 19,895 | 4th |
| 19 January 2011 | Persiba | H | 3–0 | Leonard 4', M. Ridhuan 59', Roman 71' | 19,238 | 3rd |
| 23 January 2011 | Persib | H | 1–1 | Roman 60' | 15,300 | 3rd |
| 26 January 2011 | Sriwijaya | A | 1–1 | Sunarto 47' | 13,206 | 3rd |
| 6 February 2011 | Persipura | H | 1–0 | Sunarto 89' | 36,994 | 2nd |
| 10 February 2011 | Persiwa | H | 4–0 | Bustomi 23', M. Ridhuan 35', Amirudin (2) 76', 89' | 24,425 | 2nd |
| 7 March 2011 | Persipura | A | 1–6 | Roman 9' | 18,763 | 2nd |
| 10 March 2011 | Persiwa | A | 0–1 | | 4,750 | 5th |
| 23 March 2011 | Persiba | A | 0–0 | | 4,326 | 4th |
| 1 April 2011 | Persib | H | 2–0 | Alam Shah (2) 42', 82' | 15,000 | 3rd |
| 10 April 2011 | Persija | H | 2–1 | Roman 5' (pen.), Sunarto 17' | 32,597 | 3rd |
| 15 April 2011 | PSPS | H | 4–2 | Alam Shah (4) 15', 35', 52', 71' | 9,258 | 3rd |
| 24 April 2011 | Pelita Jaya | A | 0–1 | | | 4th |
| 28 April 2011 | Semen Padang | A | 0–2 | | 12,102 | 4th |
| 29 May 2011 | Deltras Sidoarjo | H | 3–0 | Roman 37', Yongki (2) 39', 69' | 14,467 | 4th |
| 4 June 2011 | Persela | H | 1–0 | Amiruddin 90+1' | 14,467 | 3rd |
| 8 June 2011 | Persijap | A | 3–2 | Sunarto 8', Yongki 47', T.A. Musafri 61' | 7,800 | 3rd |
| 15 June 2011 | Persisam | H | 2–0 | Golian 41', Fakhrudin 87' | 14,054 | 3rd |
| 18 June 2011 | Bontang | H | 8–0 | T.A. Musafri (2) 1', 8', Yongki (3) 11', 62', 83', Roman (2) 55', 72', Amiruddin 49' | 32,800 | 2nd |

=== League table ===
| Pos | Team | Pld | W | D | L | GF | GA | GD | Pts | Qualification |
|---|---|---|---|---|---|---|---|---|---|---|
| 1 | Persipura Jayapura (C) | 28 | 17 | 9 | 2 | 63 | 23 | +40 | 60 | Qualification for AFC Champions League qualifying play-off |
| 2 | Arema Indonesia | 28 | 15 | 7 | 6 | 52 | 25 | +27 | 52 | Qualification for AFC Cup group stage (Note: Arema qualified for the AFC Cup as league runners-up since Piala Indonesia was not held in 2011.) |
| 3 | Persija Jakarta | 28 | 15 | 7 | 6 | 52 | 28 | +24 | 52 | |
| 4 | Semen Padang | 28 | 12 | 12 | 4 | 41 | 27 | +14 | 48 | |
| 5 | Sriwijaya | 28 | 13 | 7 | 8 | 43 | 32 | +11 | 46 | |

Source: Indonesia Super League Table
Rules for classification: 1) points; 2) goal difference; 3) number of goals scored.
(C) Champions

== AFC Champions League ==
=== Group stage ===
| Date | Opponents | H / A | Result F–A | Scorers | Attendance | Group position |
|---|---|---|---|---|---|---|
| 3 March 2011 | Cerezo Osaka | A | 1–2 | Alam Shah 50' (pen.) | 10,859 | 3rd |
| 16 March 2011 | Jeonbuk Hyundai Motors | H | 0–4 | | 30,000 | 4th |
| 5 April 2011 | Shandong Luneng | H | 1–1 | Fakhrudin 90+1' | 5,600 | 4th |
| 20 April 2011 | Shandong Luneng | A | 0–5 | | 10,059 | 4th |
| 3 May 2011 | Cerezo Osaka | H | 0–4 | | 4,000 | 4th |
| 10 May 2011 | Jeonbuk Hyundai Motors | A | 0–6 | | 6,439 | 4th |

| Pos | Team | Pld | W | D | L | GF | GA | GD | Pts | Qualification |
|---|---|---|---|---|---|---|---|---|---|---|
| 1 | (South Korea) Jeonbuk Hyundai Motors | 6 | 5 | 0 | 1 | 14 | 2 | +12 | 15 | Advance to knockout stage |
| 2 | (Japan) Cerezo Osaka | 6 | 4 | 0 | 2 | 11 | 4 | +7 | 12 | Advance to knockout stage |
| 3 | (China) Shandong Luneng | 6 | 2 | 1 | 3 | 9 | 8 | +1 | 7 | |
| 4 | (Indonesia) Arema | 6 | 0 | 1 | 5 | 2 | 22 | −20 | 1 | |

Source: RSSSF
