= 2011–12 Arema FC season =

Arema Indonesia
- Full name: Arek Malang Football Club
- Nickname: Singo Edan(en: The Crazy Lions)
- Founded: 11 August 1987
- Ground: Gajayana Stadium, Malang
- Capacity: 30,000
- Owner: PT. Arema Indonesia
- Chairman: (Indonesia) M. Nur
- Manager: (Indonesia) Agung Setya Nugraha
- Coach: (Serbia) Dejan Antonić
- League: Indonesian Premier League
- 2011–12 IPL: 10th
Home colours	Away colours

The 2011–12 season is Arema FC's 1st season since the inception of the Indonesia Premier League.

== Players ==
=== First team squad ===
Note: Flags indicate national team as defined under FIFA eligibility rules; some limited exceptions apply. Players may hold more than one non-FIFA nationality.

No.	Pos.	Nation	Player
—	GK	IDN	Agung Hermawan
8	DF	IDN	Fariz Bagus Dhinata
9	MF	SVK	Roman Chmelo
—	DF	IDN	Chairul Anam
11	MF	IDN	Ahmad Amiruddin
13	FW	IDN	Jaya Teguh Angga
16	DF	IDN	Hermawan
22	MF	IDN	Putut Waringin Jati
23	DF	IDN	Gunawan Dwi Cahyo
24	MF	IDN	Legimin Raharjo
27	MF	IDN	Eka Hera

No.	Pos.	Nation	Player
29	MF	IDN	Talaohu Abdul Musafri
32	DF	IDN	Putra Habibi
33	GK	IDN	Dede Sulaiman
36	DF	IDN	Tomy Jailani
45	GK	IDN	Aji Saka
-	GK	LAT	Deniss Romanovs
-	MF	SRB	Marko Krasić
-	FW	IDN	Purwanto
-	DF	IDN	Hery Prasetyo
-	MF	IDN	Amadeus Suropati
-	DF	IDN	Herman Romansyah

=== Transfers ===
In: Note: Flags indicate national team as defined under FIFA eligibility rules; some limited exceptions apply. Players may hold more than one non-FIFA nationality.

No.	Pos.	Nation	Player
—	GK	LAT	Deniss Romanovs (from (Indonesia) Cendrawasih FC)
—	DF	IDN	Hery Prasetyo (from (Indonesia) Gresik United)
—	MF	SRB	Marko Krasić (from (Serbia) FK Borac Čačak)
—	MF	IDN	Amadeus Suropati (from (Australia) Forrestfield United)
—	FW	IDN	Purwanto (from (Indonesia) PSBI Blitar)
—	GK	IDN	Agung Hermawan (Unknown)

Out: Note: Flags indicate national team as defined under FIFA eligibility rules; some limited exceptions apply. Players may hold more than one non-FIFA nationality.

No.	Pos.	Nation	Player
—	FW	SGP	Noh Alam Shah (released)
—	MF	SGP	Muhammad Ridhuan (to (Indonesia) Arema FC)
—	MF	URU	Esteban Guillén (to (Indonesia) Persiba Balikpapan)
—	GK	IDN	Kurnia Meiga Hermansyah (to (Indonesia) Arema FC)
—	FW	IDN	Dendi Santoso (to (Indonesia) Arema FC)
—	MF	IDN	Hendro Siswanto (to (Indonesia) Arema FC)
—	FW	IDN	Sunarto (to (Indonesia) Arema FC)
—	DF	IDN	Johan Ahmad Farizi (to (Indonesia) Arema FC)
—	DF	IDN	Leonard Tupamahu (released)
—	MF	IDN	Ronny Firmansyah (released)
—	DF	IDN	Usep Munandar (released)
—	DF	IDN	Irfan Raditya (released)

== Indonesian Premier League ==
=== Table ===
Pos	Team	Pld	W	D	L	GF	GA	GD	Pts	Qualification or relegation
1	Semen Padang (C)	22	13	7	2	46	21	+25	46	2013 AFC Cup Group stage
2	Persebaya 1927	22	12	2	8	31	23	+8	38	
3	Arema Indonesia	22	11	4	7	42	26	+16	37	
4	Persibo Bojonegoro	22	11	3	8	31	24	+7	36	2013 AFC Cup Group stage (Note: Persibo Bojonegoro were chosen by PSSI to join the Group stage of the 2013 AFC Cup as the winner of 2012 Piala Indonesia.)
5	Persiba Bantul	22	10	5	7	27	23	+4	35	

Updated to match(es) played on 17 July 2012. Source: IPL
Rules for classification: 1) points; 2) goal difference; 3) number of goals scored.
(C) Champions

=== Fixtures and results ===
14 December 2011	Arema FC	2–1	PSMS Medan	Kanjuruhan Stadium, Malang, East Java
15:30 WIB	Noh Alam Shah 46'; Musafri 55'	Report	Alcorsé 22'

18 December 2011	Arema FC	2–0	Persibo Bojonegoro	Kanjuruhan Stadium, Malang, East Java
15:30 WIB	Cahyo 13'; Chmelo 33'	Report

7 Januari 2012	Persija Jakarta	3–3	Arema FC	Manahan Stadium, Solo
15:30 WIB	De Porras 32', 45+1'; Bayauw 67'	Report	Musafri 8', 77'; Amiruddin 80'

14 Januari 2012	Persiraja Banda Aceh	1–1	Arema FC	Harapan Bangsa Stadium, Lhoong Raya
15:30 WIB	Djibril 48' (pen.)	Report	Chmelo 57'

22 Januari 2012	Semen Padang FC	3–1	Arema FC	Haji Agus Salim Stadium, Padang
16:00 WIB	Mofu 35', 73'; Dedi Hartono 88'	Report	Amiruddin 90+1'

4 February 2012	Arema FC	0–1	Persiba Bantul	Gajayana Stadium, Malang
16:30 WIB		Report	González 59'

26 February 2012	Arema FC	2–2	Persijap Jepara	Gajayana Stadium, Malang
16:30 WIB	Chmelo 61'; Jati 71'	Report	Hai 85'; Wirahadi 90+1'

4 March 2012	Persebaya 1927	2-1	Arema FC	Gelora Bung Tomo Stadium, Surabaya
16:30 WIB	Mat Halil 12'; Otávio Dutra 73'	Report	Musafri 90+3'

17 March 2012	Arema FC	4-0	PSM Makassar	Kanjuruhan Stadium, Malang, East Java
16:30 WIB	Barisic 23'; Chmelo 37'; Musafri 65'; I Ketut Mahendra 70' (o.g.)	Report

26 March 2012	Persema Malang	1-0	Arema FC	Gajayana Stadium, Malang, East Java
21:00 WIB	Kurniawan 79'	Report

29 April 2012	Arema FC	3-2	Persija Jakarta	Kanjuruhan Stadium, Malang, East Java
21:00 WIB	Raharjo 5'; Amiruddin 45'; Musafri 54'	Report	David Da Rocha 20'; De Porras 51'

12 May 2012	PSM Makassar	1-1	Arema FC	Mattoangin Stadium, Makassar, Indonesia
21:00 WIB	Spasojević 78' (pen.)	Report	Barisic 29'

3 June 2012	Arema FC	2-1	Persiraja Banda Aceh	Kanjuruhan Stadium, Malang, East Java
17:30 WIB	Musafri 17'; Amiruddin 25'	Report	Arief Kurniawan 39'

9 June 2012	Arema FC	2-1	Semen Padang	Kanjuruhan Stadium, Malang, East Java
17:30 WIB	Barisic 35'; Chmelo 60'	Report	Sinaga 52'

16 June 2012	Persibo Bojonegoro	3-1	Arema FC	Letjen Haji Sudirman Stadium, Bojonegoro Regency, Indonesia
17:30 WIB	Iskandar 29'; Teguh Wahyu Saputra 63', 75'	Report	Jati 88'

23 June 2012	Persiba Bantul	1-0	Arema FC	Sultan Agung Stadium, Bantul, Indonesia
17:30 WIB	Busari 25'	Report

30 June 2012	Persijap Jepara	0-1	Arema FC	Gelora Bumi Kartini Stadium, Jepara, Indonesia
17:30 WIB		Report	Barisic 90+1'

4 July 2012	Arema FC	4-0	Persema Malang	Kanjuruhan Stadium, Malang, East Java
21:00 WIB	Chmelo 26'; Musafri 33'; Amiruddin 46', 73'	Report

8 July 2012	PSMS Medan	1-3	Arema FC	Teladan Stadium, Medan, Indonesia
17:30 WIB	Rinaldo 70'	Report	Barisic 48', 55'; Chmelo 53'

11 July 2012	Bontang FC	1-0	Arema FC	Mulawarman Stadium, Bontang, Indonesia
17:30 WIB	Rully Padengke 83'	Report

14 July 2012	Arema FC	2-1	Persebaya 1927	Kanjuruhan Stadium, Malang, East Java
17:30 WIB	Krasić 25'; Chmelo 52'	Report	Taufiq Yanuarso 1'

17 July 2012	Arema FC	7-0	Bontang FC	Kanjuruhan Stadium, Malang, East Java
17:30 WIB	Amiruddin 15'; Chmelo 38', 66', 90'; Jati 40'; Anggo Sapta 51'; Jaya Warsito 74'	Report

== 2012 AFC Cup ==
Arema FC qualified for the 2012 AFC Cup as runners up in the 2010-11 Indonesia Super League. In December 2011, they were drawn in group H, along with Kelantan FA of Malaysia, Ayeyawady United F.C. of Myanmar and Navibank Saigon of Vietnam.

Team	Pld	W	D	L	GF	GA	GD	Pts	KEL	ARE	NVB	AYE
(Malaysia) Kelantan	6	4	1	1	10	5	+5	13		3–0	0–0	1–0
(Indonesia) Arema	6	2	1	3	12	12	0	7 (Note: Tiebreakers: Arema, Navibank Sài Gòn and Ayeyawady United are ranked by their head-to-head record (Arema: 7 pts; Navibank Sài Gòn: 6 pts; Ayeyawady United: 4 pts).)	1–3		6–2	1–1
(Vietnam) Navibank Sài Gòn	6	2	1	3	10	12	−2	7	1–2	3–1		4–1
(Myanmar) Ayeyawady United	6	2	1	3	7	10	−3	7	3–1	0–3	2–0	

Legend: Blue = home team win; Yellow = draw; Red = away team win.
Notes:

7 March 2012	Arema FC	1 – 1	Ayeyawady United F.C.	Gajayana Stadium, Malang, East Java
15:00 WIB	Chmelo 28'; Cahyo (red card) 42'	Report	Khin Min (yellow card) 10'; Nay Lin Aung (yellow card) 26'; Jupiter Yves Ngangue (yellow card) 31'; Fariz Bagus Dhinata 63' (o.g.); John Karangwa (yellow card) 78'	Attendance: 2,000; Referee: (Oman) Ibrahim Al Hosni

21 March 2012	Navibank Saigon	3 - 1	Arema FC	Thong Nhat Stadium, Ho Chi Minh City
18:00 WIB	Fonseca 33', 65', 82'	Report	Jati 5'; Krasić (yellow card) 39'; Hermawan (yellow card) 55'	Attendance: 4,005; Referee: (Hong Kong) Kok Ng Chiu
