= 2010 Indonesian Community Shield =

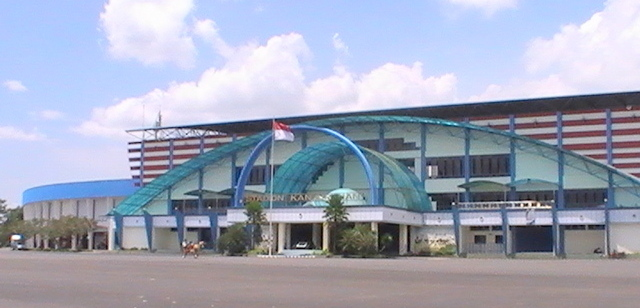
- The match was played at Kanjuruhan Stadium.
| Arema Indonesia | Sriwijaya |
| 1 | 3 |
- Date: 25 September 2010
- Venue: Kanjuruhan Stadium, Malang
- Referee: Aeng Suarlan

The 2010 Indonesian Community Shield was the second edition of the Indonesian Community Shield. It was a match played by the 2009–10 Indonesia Super League winners Arema Indonesia and 2010 Piala Indonesia winners Sriwijaya FC. It took place on 25 September 2010 at the Kanjuruhan Stadium in Malang, Indonesia. Sriwijaya won the match 3–1.

== Match details ==
25 September 2010
20:30 WIB

| Arema Indonesia | 1–3 | Sriwijaya FC |
|---|---|---|
| Njanka 36' (pen.) | Report | Budi 28'; Gumbs 45'; Diano 59' |

Kanjuruhan Stadium, Malang
Referee: Aeng Suarlan

| Arema Indonesia | Sriwijaya FC |

Arema Indonesia :
| GK | 1 | (Indonesia) Kurnia Meiga |
| RB | 3 | (Indonesia) Zulkifli Syukur |
| CB | 25 | (Cameroon) Pierre Njanka (c) |
| CB | 2 | (Indonesia) Purwaka Yudhi | (substituted off) 85' |
| LB | 7 | (Indonesia) Benny Wahyudi |
| DM | 32 | (Indonesia) Ronny Firmansyah | (substituted off) 42' |
| DM | 10 | (Indonesia) Ahmad Bustomi |
| RM | 6 | (Singapore) Muhammad Ridhuan | (substituted off) 75' |
| LM | 22 | (Indonesia) Dendi Santoso |
| AM | 86 | (Slovakia) Roman Chmelo | (substituted off) 58' |
| CF | 9 | (Singapore) Noh Alam Shah |
Substitutes:
| GK | 31 | (Indonesia) Achmad Kurniawan |
| DF | 4 | (Indonesia) Hermawan |
| DF | 32 | (Indonesia) Leonard Tupamahu | (substituted in) 85' |
| MF | 5 | (Indonesia) Muhammad Fakhrudin | (substituted in) 58' |
| MF | 23 | (Indonesia) Yongki Aribowo | (substituted in) 42' |
| FW | 29 | (Indonesia) Talaohu Musafri | (substituted in) 75' |
Manager:
(Czech Republic) Miroslav Janu

Sriwijaya FC :
| GK | 12 | (Indonesia) Ferry Rotinsulu |
| RB | 22 | (Indonesia) Supardi Nasir |
| CB | 6 | (Brazil) Diano |
| CB | 16 | (Indonesia) Achmad Jufriyanto |
| LB | 23 | (Indonesia) Muhammad Ridwan |
| DM | 11 | (Indonesia) Ponaryo Astaman | | (substituted off) 90' |
| RM | 28 | (Indonesia) Oktovianus Maniani | (yellow card) 3' |
| LM | 17 | (Saint Kitts and Nevis) Keith Gumbs (c) | | (substituted off) 89' |
| AM | 15 | (Indonesia) Firman Utina | | (substituted off) 72' |
| FW | 13 | (Indonesia) Budi Sudarsono | | (substituted off) 84' |
| FW | 88 | (South Korea) Park Jung-hwan | | (substituted off) 79' |
Substitutes:
| GK | 18 | (Indonesia) Fauzal Mubaraq |
| DF | 3 | (Indonesia) Gunawan Dwi Cahyo | | (substituted in) 90' |
| DF | 5 | (Indonesia) Bobby Satria | | (substituted in) 89' |
| DF | 27 | (Indonesia) Rendy Siregar | | (substituted in) 84' |
| MF | 9 | (Indonesia) Mahadirga Lasut | | (substituted in) 72' |
| MF | 21 | (Indonesia) Ade Suhendra | | (substituted in) 79' |
| FW | 24 | (Indonesia) Mahyadi Panggabean |
Manager:
(Bulgaria) Ivan Kolev
