= Arema F.C.–Persib Bandung rivalry =

Football rivalry in Indonesia

Arema–Persib Bandung rivalry
- Location: Indonesia
- Teams: Arema; Persib Bandung
- First meeting: 13 September 1990; 1990 Jawa Pos II Cup; Persib 3–0 Arema
- Latest meeting: 25 July 2026; 2026 Piala Presiden; Persib 1–0 Arema
- Next meeting: 20 December 2026; Super League; Arema v Persib
- Stadiums: Kanjuruhan Stadium (Arema); Gelora Bandung Lautan Api Stadium (Persib)

Statistics
- Total meetings: 54
- All-time series: Arema: 14; Draw: 15; Persib Bandung: 25
- Largest victory: 30 July 2019; 2019 Liga 1 Arema 5–1 Persib
- Longest win streak: 5 games Persib (1990–2002)
- Longest unbeaten streak: 10 games Persib (2022–present)
- Current unbeaten streak: 10 games Persib (2022–present)

Arema–Persib Bandung rivalry or Western Blue and Eastern Blue derby is the name given in football to any match between two Indonesian football clubs with two different league backgrounds, Persib Bandung (Perserikatan) and Arema (Galatama). The fierce competition between both teams began in 1990 when Arema and Persib faced off in the semifinals 1990 Jawa Pos II Cup.

Persib Bandung and Arema were established in different eras, Persib was formed in 1933, while Arema in 1987. Both teams have groups of supporters who are equally well-known fanatics, namely Bobotoh (Persib Bandung) and Aremania (Arema). Both supporter groups have also been known for their psywar, conducted throughout the game, making the rivalry matches much awaited.

== History ==
Actually there is no rivalry between the two clubs and supporters. However, the current condition is due to block-blocking that has occurred among Indonesian supporters. But according to supporters this match is a match that determines who is the best blue club in among them. Violence between Aremania and Bobotoh were occurred several times. On 11 September 2022, Arema hosted at least 500 Persib supporters at Kanjuruhan Stadium for the first time since both sides clashed in the 2000s and were never given a quota for the away supporter.

== Results ==
=== Official match results ===
Data incomplete

The record counts all competitions (league, official tournament and pre-season tournament) including matches played during the era of dualism.

Competition	Date	Home team	Result	Away team	Venue	City
1990 Jawa Pos II Cup	13 September 1990	Persib	3–0	Arema	Gelora 10 November Stadium	Surabaya
1990 Central Java Governor Cup II	25 October 1990	Persib	3–1	Arema	Citarum Stadium	Semarang
1990 Main Cup	21 November 1990	Persib	1–0	Arema	Senayan Stadium	Jakarta
1992 Main Cup	30 October 1992	Persib	3–1	Arema	Senayan Stadium	Jakarta
2002 Premier Division	14 February 2002	Persib	2–1	Arema	Siliwangi Stadium	Bandung
2002 Premier Division	18 April 2002	Arema	1–0	Arema	Gajayana Stadium	Malang
2003 Premier Division	5 March 2003	Arema	1–0	Persib	Gajayana Stadium	Malang
2003 Premier Division	3 August 2003	Persib	1–1	Arema	Siliwangi Stadium	Bandung
2005 Premier Division	17 May 2005	Persib	2–0	Arema	Siliwangi Stadium	Bandung
2005 Premier Division	1 September 2005	Arema	1–0	Persib	Gajayana Stadium	Malang
2006 Premier Division	11 February 2006	Persib	1–0	Arema	Siliwangi Stadium	Bandung
2006 Premier Division	28/29 May 2006 (Note: The match was postponed at 27 minutes due to bad weather on 28 May 2006 at the Kanjuruhan Stadium. The match resumed on Monday morning 29 May 2006 at the same venue.)	Arema	3–1	Persib	Kanjuruhan Stadium	Malang
2008–09 Indonesia Super League	2 November 2008	Persib	2–1	Arema	Siliwangi Stadium	Bandung
2008–09 Indonesia Super League	9 May 2009	Arema	0–2	Persib	Kanjuruhan Stadium	Malang
2009–10 Indonesia Super League	19 December 2009	Arema	0–0	Persib	Kanjuruhan Stadium	Malang
2009–10 Indonesia Super League	14 March 2010	Persib	1–0	Arema	Si Jalak Harupat Stadium	Bandung
2010 Piala Indonesia Quarter-final	18 July 2010	Arema	3–0	Persib	Kanjuruhan Stadium	Malang
2010 Piala Indonesia Quarter-final	22 July 2010	Persib	2–0	Arema	Si Jalak Harupat Stadium	Bandung
2010–11 Indonesia Super League	23 January 2011	Persib	1–1	Arema	Siliwangi Stadium	Bandung
2010–11 Indonesia Super League	1 April 2011	Arema	2–0	Persib	Kanjuruhan Stadium	Malang
2011–12 Indonesia Super League	15 March 2012	Persib	2–0	Arema ISL (Note: Arema ISL is the Arema club under the leadership of Rendra Kresna and is the forerunner of the current club Arema.)	Si Jalak Harupat Stadium	Bandung
2011–12 Indonesia Super League	25 April 2012	Arema ISL	2–1	Persib	Kanjuruhan Stadium	Malang
2013 Indonesia Super League	20 April 2013	Persib	1–0	Arema	Si Jalak Harupat Stadium	Bandung
2013 Indonesia Super League	31 May 2013	Arema	1–0	Persib	Kanjuruhan Stadium	Malang
2014 Indonesia Super League	13 April 2014	Persib	3–2	Arema	Si Jalak Harupat Stadium	Bandung
2014 Indonesia Super League	25 May 2014	Arema	2–2	Persib	Kanjuruhan Stadium	Malang
2014 Indonesia Super League Semi-final	4 November 2014	Persib	3–1	Arema	Gelora Sriwijaya Stadium	Palembang
2014 Indonesian Inter Island Cup final	1 February 2015 (Note: The final match of the Inter Island Cup (IIC) 2014 which brought together Arema Cronus against Persib Bandung at the Gelora Delta Stadium, Sidoarjo, on 25 January 2014, has been postponed. That was after, the local security did not recommend holding the match.)	Arema	2–1	Persib	Gelora Sriwijaya Stadium	Palembang
Friendly	11 August 2015	Arema	1–0	Persib	Kanjuruhan Stadium	Malang
2016 Bali Island Cup Final	23 February 2016	Arema	1–0	Persib	Kapten I Wayan Dipta Stadium	Gianyar
2016 Bhayangkara Cup Final	3 April 2016	Arema	2–0	Persib	Gelora Bung Karno Stadium	Jakarta
2016 Indonesia Soccer Championship A	27 August 2016	Persib	0–0	Arema	Si Jalak Harupat Stadium	Bandung
2016 Indonesia Soccer Championship A	18 December 2016	Arema	0–0	Persib	Kanjuruhan Stadium	Malang
2017 Liga 1	15 April 2017	Persib	0–0	Arema	Gelora Bandung Lautan Api Stadium	Bandung
2017 Liga 1	12 August 2017	Arema	0–0	Persib	Kanjuruhan Stadium	Malang
Friendly	18 March 2018	Persib	2–1	Arema	Gelora Bandung Lautan Api Stadium	Bandung
2018 Liga 1	15 April 2018	Arema	2–2	Persib	Kanjuruhan Stadium	Malang
2018 Liga 1	13 September 2018	Persib	2–0	Arema	Gelora Bandung Lautan Api Stadium	Bandung
2018–19 Piala Indonesia Round of 16	18 February 2019	Persib	1–1	Arema	Si Jalak Harupat Stadium	Bandung
2018–19 Piala Indonesia Round of 16	22 February 2019	Arema	2–2	Persib	Kanjuruhan Stadium	Malang
2019 Liga 1	30 July 2019	Arema	5–1	Persib	Kanjuruhan Stadium	Malang
2019 Liga 1	12 November 2019	Persib	3–0	Arema	Si Jalak Harupat Stadium	Bandung
2020 Liga 1	8 March 2020	Arema	1–2	Persib	Kanjuruhan Stadium	Malang
2021–22 Liga 1	28 November 2021	Persib	0–1	Arema	Maguwoharjo Stadium	Sleman
2021–22 Liga 1	9 March 2022	Arema	1–2	Persib	Ngurah Rai Stadium	Denpasar
2022–23 Liga 1	11 September 2022	Arema	1–2	Persib	Kanjuruhan Stadium	Malang
2022–23 Liga 1	23 February 2023	Persib	1–0	Arema	Pakansari Stadium	Cibinong
2023–24 Liga 1	7 July 2023	Arema	3–3	Persib	Kapten I Wayan Dipta Stadium	Gianyar
2023–24 Liga 1	8 November 2023	Persib	2–2	Arema	Gelora Bandung Lautan Api Stadium	Bandung
2024–25 Liga 1	25 August 2024	Persib	1–1	Arema	Jalak Harupat Stadium	Bandung
2024–25 Liga 1	24 January 2025	Arema	1–3	Persib	Gelora Supriyadi Stadium	Blitar
2025–26 Super League	22 September 2025	Arema	1–2	Persib	Kanjuruhan Stadium	Malang
2025–26 Super League	24 April 2026	Persib	0–0	Arema	Gelora Bandung Lautan Api Stadium	Bandung
2026 Piala Presiden	25 July 2026	Persib	1–0	Arema	Jalak Harupat Stadium	Bandung
2026–27 Super League	20 December 2026	Arema		Persib	Kanjuruhan Stadium	Malang
2026–27 Super League	21 March 2027	Persib		Arema	Gelora Bandung Lautan Api Stadium	Bandung

== Players in both teams ==
Note:

- Players in **bold** are still active

=== Moving from Arema to Persib ===
Player	Arema	Persib
(Brazil) Wiliam Marcílio	2024–2025	2025
(Indonesia) **Adam Alis**	2017, 2022–2023	2024–
(Indonesia) Ryan Kurnia	2022	2023–2025
(Montenegro) Srđan Lopičić	2016	2019
(Indonesia) (Brazil) Fabiano Beltrame	2014–2015, 2022	2019–2021
(Indonesia) (Argentina) Esteban Vizcarra	2016–2017	2019–2022
(Indonesia) (Nigeria) Victor Igbonefo	2013–2016	2018, 2020–2025
(Indonesia) (Netherlands) Raphael Maitimo	2016	2017
(Indonesia) Purwaka Yudhi	2009–2011, 2013–2015, 2018	2016–2017
(Indonesia) Hermawan	2002–2005, 2009–2013, 2015–2016	2016
(Indonesia) Yandi Sofyan	2013–2014	2015–2016
(Indonesia) Samsul Arif	2013–2015	2015–2016
(Indonesia) Muhammad Natshir	2013	2014–2022
(Indonesia) **Dedi Kusnandar**	2012–2013	2014–2015, 2017–
(Indonesia) Firman Utina	2004–2006	2013–2015
(Indonesia) **Achmad Jufriyanto**	2008–2009	2013–2015, 2017–2018, 2019–
(Singapore) Noh Alam Shah	2009–2011	2012
(Indonesia) (Cameroon) Herman Dzumafo	2011–2012	2012–2013
(Indonesia) Zulkifli Syukur	2008–2011	2011–2012
(Brazil) Márcio Souza	2010–2011	2011–2012
(Indonesia) Hendra Ridwan	2008–2009, 2011	2011–2012
(Indonesia) Rachmat Afandi	2009–2010	2010–2011
(Indonesia) Markus Haris Maulana	2009–2010	2010–2011
(Indonesia) Gendut Doni Christiawan	2005–2006	2006–2007
(Indonesia) Charis Yulianto	1997–2002, 2011–2012	2006–2007
(Indonesia) Listianto Raharjo	2003	2004

=== Moving from Persib to Arema ===
Player	Persib	Arema
(Indonesia) **Alfeandra Dewangga**	2025–2026	2026–
(Indonesia) **Robi Darwis**	2021–2026	2026–
(Indonesia) Gian Zola	2016–2022	2022–2023
(South Korea) Oh In-kyun	2018–2019	2020
(Argentina) Jonatan Bauman	2018	2020
(Indonesia) Ricky Kayame	2016	2019
(Mali) Makan Konaté	2014–2015	2018–2019
(Indonesia) (Uruguay) Cristian Gonzáles	2008–2011	2013–2017
(Indonesia) Boy Jati Asmara	2006–2007	2011–2012
(Indonesia) Waluyo	2008–2009	2009–2011
(Romania) Leontin Chițescu	2008–2009	2009–2010
(Indonesia) Erik Setiawan	2002–2003, 2004–2008	2008–2009
(Indonesia) Dadang Sudrajat	2002–2005, 2010–2012	2008–2009
(Indonesia) Alexander Pulalo	2003–2004	2004–2009

=== Head coaches who coached for both clubs ===
Head coach	Arema	Persib
(Netherlands) Robert Alberts	2009–2010	2019–2022
(Indonesia) Daniel Roekito	2001–2002	2010–2011
(Serbia) Dejan Antonić	2011–2012	2016
(Argentina) Mario Gómez	2020	2017–2018

== Honours ==
Arema	Competition	Persib
Domestic
2	League competitions	10
1	First Division	—
4	Indonesia President's Cup	1
2	Piala Indonesia	—
9 (Note: If excluding pre-season tournaments, Arema has 5 titles, while Persib has 10 titles.)	Aggregate	11
