= Trofeo Persija =

Indonesian football tournament

- Founded: 2011
- Region: Jakarta
- Teams: 3
- Current champions: Persija Jakarta
- Most championships: Persija Jakarta (4 titles)

The Trofeo Persija or Persija Jakarta Cup is dedicated to celebrating the birth of Persija Jakarta. It is a friendly tournament organised each year by Persija Jakarta at the end of November.

The teams play 3 round-robin 45-minute matches. If any match ends in a draw, it is decided by a penalty shoot-out. Three points are awarded for a victory during regular play, with no points going to the loser. If the match is decided by penalties, the winner is awarded 2 points and the loser 1.

== Editions ==
=== 2012 Trofeo Persija ===
==== Final Tournament Standings ====
- 3 points for win, 0 points for loss
- 2 points for penalty kick win, 1 point for penalty kick loss
- Persija Jakarta wins tournament

Rank	Team	GP	W	PK-W	L	PK-L	GF	GA	P
1	(Indonesia) Persija Jakarta	2	2	0	0	0	3	1	6
2	(Indonesia) Persisam Putra Samarinda	2	0	1	1	0	0	1	2
3	Arema Indonesia	2	0	0	1	1	1	2	0

==== Scorers ====
Rank	Name	Team	Goals
1	(Indonesia) Rahmat Affandi	(Indonesia) Persija Jakarta	1
1	(Indonesia) Anindito Wahyu Erminarno	(Indonesia) Persija Jakarta	1
1	(Indonesia) Dendi Santoso	Arema Indonesia	1

==== Matches ====
24 November 2012	Persisam Putra Samarinda	0–1	Persija Jakarta	Central Jakarta, DKI Jakarta
16:00 UTC+7			Koné 27' (o.g.)	Stadium: Gelora Bung Karno Stadium

24 November 2012	Persisam Putra Samarinda	0–0 (5–4 p)	Arema Indonesia	Central Jakarta, DKI Jakarta
17:00 UTC+7				Stadium: Gelora Bung Karno Stadium
	Penalties
	Supriyono (penalty scored); Njanka (penalty scored); Gatra (penalty scored); Koné (penalty scored); Fauzi (penalty scored)		(penalty scored) Gonçalves; (penalty scored) Kayamba; (penalty scored) Greg; (penalty scored) Sasongko; (penalty missed) Igbonefo

24 November 2012	Arema Indonesia	1–2	Persija Jakarta	Central Jakarta, DKI Jakarta
18:00 UTC+7	Dendi 38'		Anindito 6'; Rahmat Affandi 42'	Stadium: Gelora Bung Karno Stadium
