= Alamsyah =

Alamsyah is both a given name and a surname. Notable people with the name include:

Given name:

- Alamsyah Nasution (born 1981), Indonesian footballer
- Alamsyah Ratu Perwiranegara (1925–1998), Indonesian military officer and diplomat
- Alamsyah Yunus (born 1986), Indonesian badminton player

Surname:

- Donny Alamsyah (born 1978), Indonesian actor
