= Dadang =

Dadang is a masculine given name found in Indonesia. Notable people with this name include:

- Dadang Apridianto (born 1992), an Indonesian football player
- Dadang Hawari (1940 – 2020), an Indonesian psychiatrist
- Dadang Sudrajat (born 1979), an Indonesian former football player
- Dadang Suprayogi (1914 – 1998), an Indonesian military officer and politician
- Dadang Supriatna (born 1971), also Indonesian politician
- Dadang Wigiarto (1966 – 2020), yet another Indonesian politician

== See also ==
- Tropical Depression Dadang (1983), a tropical depression in December 1983
