= Pranata =

Pranata is a surname. Notable people with the surname include:

- Hansamu Yama Pranata (born 1995), Indonesian footballer
- Aisyah Pranata (born 2003), Indonesian badminton player
- Tommy Pranata (born 1982), Indonesian footballer
