= PSKS Krakatau Steel =

Indonesian football club

PSKS
- Full name: Persatuan Sepakbola Krakatau Steel
- Nickname: The Steel
- Founded: 1970; 56 years ago
- Ground: Krakatau Steel Stadium; Cilegon, Banten
- Capacity: 15,000
- Owner: PT Krakatau Steel
- Chairman: Iman Ariyadi
- League: Liga 4
Home colours	Away colours

Persatuan Sepakbola Krakatau Steel (simply known as PSKS) is an Indonesian football club based in Cilegon, Banten. They currently compete in Liga 4 Banten zone.

== Squad (2008–09) ==
Note: Flags indicate national team as defined under FIFA eligibility rules; some limited exceptions apply. Players may hold more than one non-FIFA nationality.

No.	Pos.	Nation	Player
1	GK	IDN	Agus
2	GK	IDN	Wahid
3	DF	IDN	Temon
4	DF	IDN	Bambang
5	DF	IDN	Lutfi
6	DF	IDN	Dudung
7	DF	IDN	Bono
8	MF	IDN	Robert
9	MF	IDN	Aldo
10	MF	IDN	Ali
11	MF	IDN	Tio

No.	Pos.	Nation	Player
12	MF	IDN	Azam
13	MF	IDN	Mamat
14	MF	IDN	Evin
15	MF	IDN	Eko
16	FW	IDN	Arif (captain)
17	FW	IDN	Ismail
18	FW	IDN	Hermawan
19	FW	IDN	Edo
20	FW	IDN	Darmawan
21	FW	IDN	Kurnia
22	FW	IDN	Herry

== Kit suppliers ==
- Vilour (2009–2010)
