= Muhammad Yasir =

Indonesian footballer

Personal information
- Full name: Muhammad Yasir Syamsuddin
- Date of birth: 13 January 1985 (age 41)
- Place of birth: Medan, Indonesia
- Height: 1.82 m (6 ft 0 in)
- Position: Goalkeeper

Senior career*
Years	Team	Apps	(Gls)
2004–2005	Persijatim	12	(0)
2005−2008	Persikota Tangerang	32	(0)
2008−2009	Arema Malang	18	(0)
2009−2010	Persija Jakarta	27	(0)
2010−2012	Persijap Jepara	36	(0)
2012−2014	Persiwa Wamena	34	(0)
Total		159	(0)

International career
2004	Indonesia U-19		
2007	Indonesia U-23		
- * Club domestic league appearances and goals

Muhammad Yasir Syamsuddin (born in Medan, North Sumatra, 13 January 1985) is an Indonesian former footballer.

== International career ==
In 2007, he played to represent the Indonesia U-23, in 2007 SEA Games.
