= Muhammad Bahtiar =

Indonesian association footballer

Personal information
- Full name: Muhammad Bahtiar Ude
- Date of birth: 26 November 1987 (age 38)
- Place of birth: Maraping, Indonesia
- Height: 1.73 m (5 ft 8 in)
- Position: Central midfielder

Youth career
- SSB Loa Duri Kukar

Senior career*
Years	Team	Apps	(Gls)
2005–2006	Mitra Kukar		
2007–2008	Persipura Jayapura	19	(1)
2008–2009	Arema Malang	5	(0)
2009–2010	Bontang	21	(1)
2010–2015	Persiba Balikpapan	63	(3)
2015–2021	Mitra Kukar	67	(0)
2022–2024	Serpong City	16	(2)

International career
2008	Indonesia U21		
2007–2009	Indonesia U23		
2007	Indonesia	1	(0)
- * Club domestic league appearances and goals as of 8 May 2024

Muhammad Bahtiar Ude (born 26 November 1987) is an Indonesian professional footballer who plays as a central midfielder. He previously played for Persiba Balikpapan.

== International career ==
In 2007, he played to represent the Indonesia U-23, in 2007 SEA Games.

== Honours ==
=== Club ===
Mitra Kukar

- General Sudirman Cup: 2015

Serpong City

- Liga 3: 2022
