= Landry Poulangoye =

Gabonese footballer

Personal information
- Full name: Jean Landry Poulangoye Mayelet
- Date of birth: 9 September 1976 (age 50)
- Place of birth: Port-Gentil, Gabon
- Height: 1.76 m (5 ft 9 in)
- Position: Midfielder

Senior career*
Years	Team	Apps	(Gls)
1993	Petrosport F.C.		
1993–1996	Mulhouse		
1996–1997	AS Cherbourg	31	(3)
1997–1998	Étoile Carouge FC	27	(2)
1998–1999	Naval 1° de Maio		
1991–2001	Tours	58	(1)
2001–2002	SC Draguignan		
2002–2004	FC Martigues		
2004–2005	R. Sprimont Comblain Sport		
2005–2006	FA Carcassonne Villalbe		
2007–2008	Red Star FC Saint-Ouen		
2008–2009	Pietà Hotspurs		
2009–2010	Arema	11	(0)
2011	Aceh United		

International career
1995–1999	Gabon	10	(0)
- * Club domestic league appearances and goals

Jean Landry Poulangoye Mayelet (born 9 September 1976) is a Gabonese former professional footballer who played as a midfielder.

== Career ==
In December 2014, Poulangoye joined Belgian club R. Sprimont Comblain Sport from FC Martigues who were in financial difficulties. In summer 2005 he left Sprimont and joined French lower-league side FA Carcassonne Villalbe.

Poulangoye played for Indonesia Super League club Arema F.C. in the 2009–10 season and made 11 appearances. The club was sanctioned by FIFA for terminating his contract unilaterally.

In 2011, he played for another Indonesian side, Aceh United.
