= Putut Waringin Jati =

Indonesian footballer

Putut Waringin
Personal information
- Full name: Putut Waringin Jati
- Date of birth: 21 December 1986 (age 39)
- Place of birth: Sukoharjo, Indonesia
- Height: 1.64 m (5 ft 5 in)
- Position: Winger

Senior career*
| Years | Team | Apps | (Gls) |
| 2005 | Deltras Sidoarjo | 19 | (6) |
| 2006 | Persita Tangerang | 11 | (3) |
| 2007–2008 | PSMS Medan | 18 | (0) |
| 2008–2009 | Semen Padang | 23 | (4) |
| 2009–2011 | PSPS Pekanbaru | 40 | (7) |
| 2011–2013 | Arema Indonesia (IPL) | 52 | (8) |
| 2014 | PSIS Semarang | 8 | (0) |
| 2014–2015 | Persewangi Banyuwangi | 4 | (0) |
| Total | | 175 | (28) |

International career
| 2005–2006 | Indonesia U-23 | | |
- * Club domestic league appearances and goals

Putut Waringin Jati (born 21 December 1986) is an Indonesian former footballer who plays as a winger.

== Honours ==
PSMS Medan

- Liga Indonesia Premier Division runner up: 2007–08
