= Bobby Satria =

Indonesian footballer

Personal information
- Full name: Bobby Satria
- Date of birth: 24 August 1986 (age 40)
- Place of birth: Padang, Indonesia
- Height: 1.78 m (5 ft 10 in)
- Position: Centre-back

Senior career*
Years	Team	Apps	(Gls)
2006–2007	Persita Tangerang	18	(1)
2008	Persebaya Surabaya	28	(0)
2009–2011	Sriwijaya	31	(0)
2011–2012	Mitra Kukar	5	(0)
2013	PSPS Pekanbaru	14	(0)
2014	Persikabo Bogor	13	(0)
2015–2016	Bali United	16	(0)
2017	Sriwijaya	18	(0)
2018	Mitra Kukar	2	(0)
2019	Kalteng Putra	1	(0)
2019	Sriwijaya	11	(0)
2020	Muba United	1	(0)
2021	Sriwijaya	4	(0)
2022	Tiga Naga	2	(0)

International career
2005	Indonesia U20		
2006–2009	Indonesia U23		
- * Club domestic league appearances and goals as of 4 October 2022

Bobby Satria (born 24 August 1986) is an Indonesian football coach and former centre-back. He is of Chinese descent and captained the Indonesian under-23 national team at the 2006 Asian Games in Qatar.

== Honours ==
Sriwijaya

- Indonesian Community Shield: 2010
- Indonesian Inter Island Cup: 2010
- Piala Indonesia: 2010
