= Erik Setiawan =

Indonesian footballer

Personal information
- Full name: Erik Setiawan
- Date of birth: 23 November 1983 (age 42)
- Place of birth: Bandung, Indonesia
- Height: 1.73 m (5 ft 8 in)
- Position: Defender

Youth career
- 1997: Persib Bandung
- 1998–2001: SMU Ragunan

Senior career*
Years	Team	Apps	(Gls)
2002–2003	Persib Bandung	10	(0)
2003–2004	Persebaya Surabaya	?	(?)
2004–2008	Persib Bandung	19	(2)
2008–2009	Arema Malang	28	(0)
2009–2010	Persija Jakarta	24	(0)
2010–2011	Persiba Balikpapan	26	(1)
2011–2012	Pelita Jaya	24	(0)
2013	Pelita Bandung Raya	11	(0)
2014	Putra Samarinda	13	(0)
2015	Cilegon United	0	(0)
2016	PSM Makassar	10	(0)
2017	Lampung Sakti	4	(0)

International career
2001–2002	Indonesia U19		
2002	Indonesia U21		
2003–2005	Indonesia U23		
2006	Indonesia	2	(0)
- * Club domestic league appearances and goals

Erik Setiawan (born in Bandung, West Java, 23 November 1983) is an Indonesian former footballer who plays as a wing back and his height is 173 cm (5 ft 8 in). He is former player for the Indonesia U-23 Team, and has been coached by Sergei Dubrovin, Bernard Schumm, Juan Paez and Peter Withe.

== National team career ==
- 2001: Indonesia U-19 Team
- 2002: Indonesia U-21 Team
- 2003: Indonesia U-23 Team (Sea Games)
- 2005: Indonesia U-23 Team (Sea Games)

== Honours ==
=== Club honors ===
Persebaya Surabaya

- First Division (1): 2003

=== Country honors ===
Indonesia U-21

- Hassanal Bolkiah Trophy : 2002
