= Achmad Kurniawan =

Indonesian footballer

Personal information
- Full name: Achmad Kurniawan
- Date of birth: 31 October 1979
- Place of birth: Jakarta, Indonesia
- Date of death: 10 January 2017 (aged 37)
- Place of death: Malang, Indonesia
- Height: 1.78 m (5 ft 10 in)
- Position: Goalkeeper

Youth career
- Persita Tangerang

Senior career*
Years	Team	Apps	(Gls)
2001–2005	Persita Tangerang	26	(0)
2006–2007	Arema Malang	10	(0)
2008–2009	Persik Kediri	21	(0)
2009–2010	Semen Padang	23	(0)
2010–2017	Arema Cronus	33	(0)
Total		113	(0)

International career
2000–2001	Indonesia U23	1	(0)
2007	Indonesia	1	(0)
- * Club domestic league appearances and goals

Achmad Kurniawan (31 October 1979 – 10 January 2017) was an Indonesian footballer who played as a goalkeeper. He is also the older brother of goalkeeper Kurnia Meiga.

Kurniawan played for Arema Cronus in the Indonesia Super League and the Indonesia national team.

On 29 December 2016, Kurniawan was treated in an intensive care unit following a heart attack and going into a coma. He later died at the Saiful Anwar Hospital in Malang, Indonesia on 10 January 2017, aged 37.

== Honours ==
Persita Tangerang

- Liga Indonesia Premier Division runner up: 2002

Arema

- Copa Indonesia: 2006
- East Java Governor Cup: 2013
- Menpora Cup: 2013
- Indonesian Inter Island Cup: 2014/15

Persik Kediri

- East Java Governor Cup: 2008
