= Alamsyah Nasution =

Indonesian footballer

Personal information
- Full name: Sulaiman Alamsyah Nasution
- Date of birth: 11 June 1981 (age 45)
- Place of birth: Indonesia
- Height: 1.73 m (5 ft 8 in)
- Position: Midfielder

Senior career*
Years	Team	Apps	(Gls)
2006–2010	Sriwijaya FC	52	(1)
2010–2011	PSPS Pekanbaru	22	(0)
2011–2014	PSMS Medan	38	(0)
Total		112	(1)
- * Club domestic league appearances and goals

Sulaiman Alamsyah Nasution (born 11 June 1981) is an Indonesian former footballer.

== Club statistics ==
=== Domestic league ===
Club	Season	Super League		Premier Division		Piala Indonesia		Total	
Club	Season	Apps	Goals	Apps	Goals	Apps	Goals	Apps	Goals
Sriwijaya FC	2009-10	20	0	-		1	0	21	0
PSPS Pekanbaru	2010-11	22	0	-		-		22	0
PSMS Medan	2011-12	18	1	-		-		18	1
Total		60	1	-		1	0	61	1

=== International cups ===
Club	Season	Champions League		AFC Cup		Total	
Club	Season	Apps	Goals	Apps	Goals	Apps	Goals
Sriwijaya FC	2009	4	0	-		4	0
Sriwijaya FC	2010	-		5	0	5	0
Sriwijaya FC	2010	0	0	-		0	0
Total		4	0	5	0	9	0

== Honours ==
Sriwijaya FC

- Liga Indonesia Premier Division: 2007–08
- Copa Indonesia/Piala Indonesia: 2007–08, 2008–09, 2010
