= Dadang Sudrajat =

Indonesian footballer

Personal information
- Full name: Dadang Sudrajat
- Date of birth: 22 March 1979 (age 47)
- Place of birth: Bandung, Indonesia
- Height: 1.72 m (5 ft 7 1/2 in)
- Position: Goalkeeper

Senior career*
Years	Team	Apps	(Gls)
2001–2002	PSKS Cilegon		
2002–2005	Persib Bandung		
2005–2006	Mitra Kukar		
2007	Persitara Jakarta Utara	2	(0)
2008–2009	Arema Indonesia	16	(0)
2009–2010	Persikab Bandung	29	(0)
2010–2012	Persib Bandung	19	(0)
- * Club domestic league appearances and goals

Dadang Sudrajat (born 22 March 1979) is an Indonesian former footballer who play as a goalkeeper.
