= Esteban Guillén =

Uruguayan footballer (born 1980)

Personal information
- Full name: Esteban Javier Guillén Tejera
- Date of birth: 20 June 1980 (age 46)
- Place of birth: Montevideo, Uruguay
- Height: 1.81 m (5 ft 11 1/2 in)
- Position: Midfielder

Senior career*
Years	Team	Apps	(Gls)
1998–1999	Montevideo Wanderers	10	(0)
2000–2001	River Plate de Montevideo	12	(0)
2001–2002	Alumni de Villa María	20	(0)
2002–2004	Club Cipolletti	40	(2)
2004–2005	Sud América	13	(0)
2005–2006	Pelita Krakatau Steel	24	(3)
2006–2007	C.A. Atenas	18	(4)
2007–2008	Persikota Tangerang	44	(5)
2008–2009	PSMS Medan	36	(4)
2010–2012	Arema Indonesia	56	(6)
2012–2013	Persiba Balikpapan	28	(2)
Total		301	(26)
- * Club domestic league appearances and goals

Esteban Guillen (born 20 June 1980) is an Uruguayan footballer who last played as a midfielder for Persiba Balikpapan.

== Honours ==
Arema Indonesia

- Indonesia Super League (1): 2009–10
