= Keith Gumbs =

Kittitian footballer (born 1972)

Personal information
- Full name: Keith Jérôme "Kayamba" Gumbs Tukijo
- Date of birth: 11 September 1972 (age 54)
- Place of birth: Basseterre, Saint Kitts and Nevis
- Height: 1.78 m (5 ft 10 in)
- Position: Forward

Senior career*
Years	Team	Apps	(Gls)
1989–1998	Newtown United	97	(26)
1995–1996	→ Twente (loan)	0	(0)
1998	Oldham Athletic	0	(0)
1998	Felgueiras	0	(0)
1999	Panionios	9	(0)
1999	Sturm Graz	0	(0)
1999	Hull City	0	(0)
2000–2001	San Juan Jabloteh	38	(22)
2001	Palmeiras	8	(3)
2001–2003	Happy Valley	59	(41)
2003–2004	Sabah	0	(0)
2004–2007	Kitchee	56	(37)
2007–2012	Sriwijaya	142	(72)
2012–2013	Arema Cronus	30	(9)
2013	Barito Putera	0	(0)
Total		447	(211)

International career
1993–2011	Saint Kitts and Nevis	41	(24)

Managerial career
- 2016: Sriwijaya (assistant)
- * Club domestic league appearances and goals

Keith Jérôme "Kayamba" Gumbs Tukijo (born 11 September 1972) is a Kittitian former professional footballer who played as a forward. He is Kittians's all-time top goalscorer for the national team with 24 goals.

== Playing career ==
Gumbs was born in Basseterre. He began playing football while he was attending the Newtown Primary School (now the Tucker/Clarke Primary School), then at Basseterre Junior High (now the Washington Archilbald High School) and finally Basseterre Senior High where he finished his schooling. Gumbs played various other sports as well, including cricket and basketball.

In his debut first division season in 1989, he helped Newtown to win the double (league and cup) earning him a call-up to the National Senior team by the then head coach Alphonso Bridgewater.

Gumbs now plays amateur football for Southern & Ettalong United in Australia, where he now lives.

== Coaching career ==
Gumbs began his coaching career as a physical coach on Sriwijaya in 2011–12 season as a player and physical coach. In 2016 Indonesia Soccer Championship A he was appointed again to be assistant coach of Sriwijaya.

== Career statistics ==
=== International ===
Appearances and goals by national team and year
National team	Year	Apps	Goals
Saint Kitts and Nevis	1993	1	1
Saint Kitts and Nevis	1995	3	5
Saint Kitts and Nevis	1996	5	3
Saint Kitts and Nevis	1997	3	2
Saint Kitts and Nevis	1998	1	1
Saint Kitts and Nevis	1999	2	0
Saint Kitts and Nevis	2000	4	3
Saint Kitts and Nevis	2001	5	5
Saint Kitts and Nevis	2002	3	1
Saint Kitts and Nevis	2004	7	2
Saint Kitts and Nevis	2009	1	0
Saint Kitts and Nevis	2010	3	1
Saint Kitts and Nevis	2011	3	0
Total		41	24

Scores and results list Saint Kitts and Nevis' goal tally first, score column indicates score after each Gumbs goal.

List of international goals scored by Keith Gumbs
No.	Date	Venue	Opponent	Score	Result	Competition	Ref.
1	2 April 1993	Warner Park Sporting Complex, Basseterre, Saint Kitts and Nevis	British Virgin Islands	5–1	5–1	1993 Caribbean Cup qualification	
2	19 March 1995	Raoul Illidge Sports Complex, Philipsburg, Sint Maarten	Sint Maarten	1–0	2–0	1995 Caribbean Cup qualification	
3	26 March 1995	Warner Park Sporting Complex, Basseterre, Saint Kitts and Nevis	Sint Maarten	–	5–0	1995 Caribbean Cup qualification	
4	26 March 1995	Warner Park Sporting Complex, Basseterre, Saint Kitts and Nevis	Sint Maarten	–	5–0	1995 Caribbean Cup qualification	
5	26 March 1995	Warner Park Sporting Complex, Basseterre, Saint Kitts and Nevis	Sint Maarten	–	5–0	1995 Caribbean Cup qualification	
6	21 May 1995	Yasco Sports Complex, St. John's, Antigua and Barbuda	Antigua and Barbuda	–	2–2	1995 Caribbean Cup qualification	
7	5 May 1996	Warner Park Sporting Complex, Basseterre, Saint Kitts and Nevis	Saint Lucia	4–0	5–1	1998 FIFA World Cup qualification	
8	26 May 1996	Industry Park, Palo Seco, Trinidad and Tobago	Jamaica	1–4	1–4	1996 Caribbean Cup	
9	23 June 1996	Warner Park Sporting Complex, Basseterre, Saint Kitts and Nevis	Saint Vincent and the Grenadines	1–2	2–2	1998 FIFA World Cup qualification	
10	10 July 1997	Warner Park Sporting Complex, Basseterre, Saint Kitts and Nevis	Grenada	1–1	2–1	1997 Caribbean Cup	
11	10 July 1997	Warner Park Sporting Complex, Basseterre, Saint Kitts and Nevis	Grenada	2–1	2–1	1997 Caribbean Cup	
12	1 April 1998	Warner Park Sporting Complex, Basseterre, Saint Kitts and Nevis	British Virgin Islands	1–0	4–0	1998 Caribbean Cup qualification	
13	18 March 2000	Warner Park Sporting Complex, Basseterre, Saint Kitts and Nevis	Turks and Caicos Islands	7–0	8–0	2002 FIFA World Cup qualification	
14	21 March 2000	Warner Park Sporting Complex, Basseterre, Saint Kitts and Nevis	Turks and Caicos Islands	2–0	6–0	2002 FIFA World Cup qualification	
15	23 April 2000	Warner Park Sporting Complex, Basseterre, Saint Kitts and Nevis	Saint Vincent and the Grenadines	1–2	1–2	2002 FIFA World Cup qualification	
16	1 March 2001	Antigua Recreation Ground, St. John's, Antigua and Barbuda	Dominican Republic	1–0	2–1	2001 Caribbean Cup qualification	
17	1 March 2001	Antigua Recreation Ground, St. John's, Antigua and Barbuda	Dominican Republic	2–1	2–1	2001 Caribbean Cup qualification	
18	4 March 2001	Antigua Recreation Ground, St. John's, Antigua and Barbuda	Antigua and Barbuda	2–0	2–2	2001 Caribbean Cup qualification	
19	16 May 2001	Marvin Lee Stadium, Macoya, Trinidad and Tobago	Haiti	2–4	2–7	2001 Caribbean Cup	
20	20 May 2001	Larry Gomes Stadium, Arima, Trinidad and Tobago	Suriname	3–0	4–0	2001 Caribbean Cup	
21	27 July 2002	Warner Park Sporting Complex, Basseterre, Saint Kitts and Nevis	Barbados	–	3–0	Friendly	
22	13 June 2004	Barbados National Stadium, Waterford, Barbados	Barbados	1–0	2–0	2006 FIFA World Cup qualification	
23	10 October 2004	Manny Ramjohn Stadium, Marabella, Trinidad and Tobago	Trinidad and Tobago	1–2	1–5	2006 FIFA World Cup qualification	
24	10 October 2010	Victoria Park, Kingstown, Saint Vincent and the Grenadines	Montserrat	2–0	4–0	2010 Caribbean Cup qualification	

== Honours ==
Happy Valley

- Hong Kong First Division League: 2002–03

Kitchee

- Hong Kong League Cup: 2005–06, 2006–07
- Hong Kong Senior Challenge Shield: 2005–06

Sriwijaya

- Liga Indonesia Premier Division/Indonesia Super League: 2007–08, 2011–12
- Copa Indonesia/Piala Indonesia: 2007–08, 2008–09, 2010
- Indonesian Community Shield: 2010
- Indonesian Inter Island Cup: 2010

Arema Cronus

- Menpora Cup: 2013

Individual

- Hong Kong League top scorer 2002–03
- Hong Kong Senior Challenge Shield top scorer: 2004–05, 2005–06
- Hong Kong League Cup top scorer: 2005–06
- Piala Indonesia Best Player: 2010
- Indonesia Super League Best Player: 2011–12
- Recipient of the National Medal of Honour Award St. Kitts and Nevis 2010
- Recognised and listed among the World's Top 100 players and Goal scorers according to the International Federation of Football History 2010
- Runner-up Indonesia Super League 2013 (Arema)
- Champion Indonesia International Tournament (Menpora Cup) 2013 - Arema
- Best Player Award Menpora Cup 2013
- Golden Boot Winner Menpora Cup 2013
- Central Coast Football, Australia Pele Sports Division 1 Men's Player of the Year 2014
- Central Coast Football, Australia Battlewin Premier League 1 Men's Golden Boot 2015

== Notes and references ==
Awards and achievements
Preceded by Cornelius Udebuluzor	Hong Kong First Division League top scorer 2002–03	Succeeded by Julius Akosah
Preceded by Julius Akosah; Sham Kwok Keung	Hong Kong Senior Shield Top Scorer; 2004–05 with Wilfed Bamnjo	Succeeded by Keith Gumbs
Preceded by Clodoaldo de Oliveira	Hong Kong League Cup Top Scorer; 2005–06 with Fábio Lopes	Succeeded by Victor Inegbenoise
Preceded by Wilfed Bamnjo; Keith Gumbs	Hong Kong Senior Shield Top Scorer; 2005–06	Succeeded by Lico; Jaimes McKee; Tales Schutz; Wong Chun Yue
