= Markus Haris Maulana =

Indonesian footballer

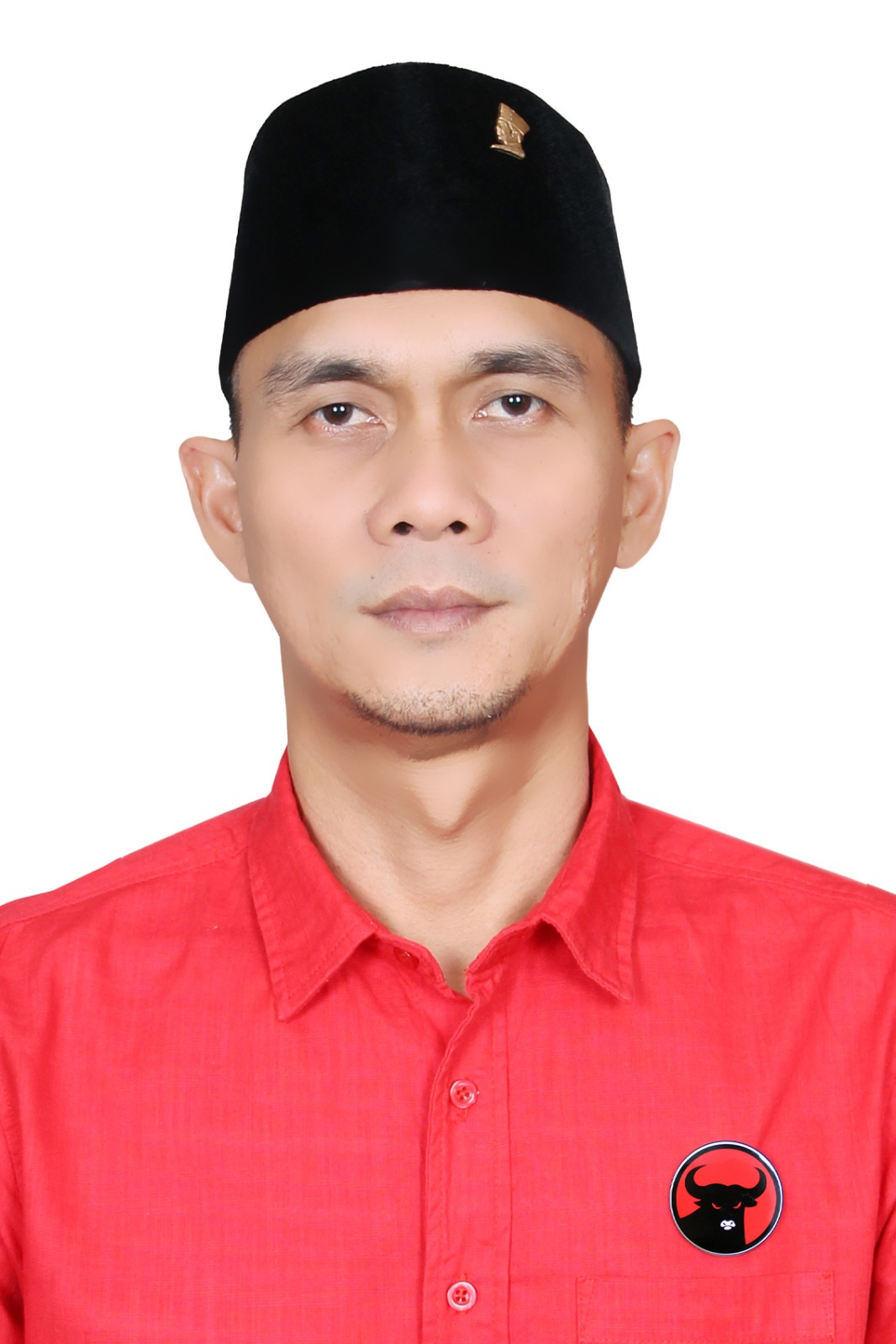
- Maulana in 2023

Personal information
- Full name: Muhammad Markus Haris Maulana
- Birth name: Markus Horison Ririhina
- Date of birth: 14 March 1981 (age 45)
- Place of birth: Pangkalan Brandan, North Sumatra, Indonesia
- Height: 1.85 m (6 ft 1 in)
- Position: Goalkeeper

Youth career
- 1998–2000: Diklat PPLP Sumatra Selatan

Senior career*
Years	Team	Apps	(Gls)
2000–2001	PSL Langkat	6	(0)
2001–2002	PS Batam	20	(0)
2002–2003	Persiraja Banda Aceh	23	(0)
2003–2008	PSMS Medan	150	(0)
2008–2009	Persik Kediri	22	(0)
2009 (6 Months)	PSMS Medan	13	(0)
2009–2010	Arema Indonesia	7	(0)
2010–2011	Persib Bandung	35	(0)
2011–2012	PSMS Medan	18	(0)
2012–2013	Persidafon Dafonsoro	22	(0)
2013–2015	PSM Makassar	38	(0)
2015–2016	PPSM Magelang	20	(0)
2016–2017	Assalam	16	(0)
Total		390	(0)

International career
2007–2012	Indonesia	37	(0)

Managerial career
- 2018–2019: Aceh United (Goalkeeper coach)
- 2019–2023: Indonesia U16 (Goalkeeper coach)
- 2025–: Persib u15 (goalkeeper coach)
Medal record
Indonesia
AFF Championship
Runner-up	2010	Team
Indonesia Independence Cup
Winner	2008 Indonesia
- * Club domestic league appearances and goals

Muhammad Markus Haris Maulana (born as Markus Horison Ririhina; 14 March 1981) is an Indonesian former professional footballer who played as a goalkeeper. He is now the goalkeeper coach for the Indonesia U16 national team. He made 37 appearances for the Indonesia national team.

== Club career ==
Maulana was born in Pangkalan Brandan, North Sumatra.

After five years playing for PSMS Medan, Maulana decided to move to Persik Kediri in 2008 but in the mid-season of 2008–09, he went back to his former club.

In the 2009–10 season of Indonesia Super League, Maulana played for Arema Malang. He also played for Persib Bandung after making his debut for the club on 21 February 2010 with 2–0 against Persisam Putra Samarinda as a substitute on the farewell match of Sinthaweechai Hathairattanakool.

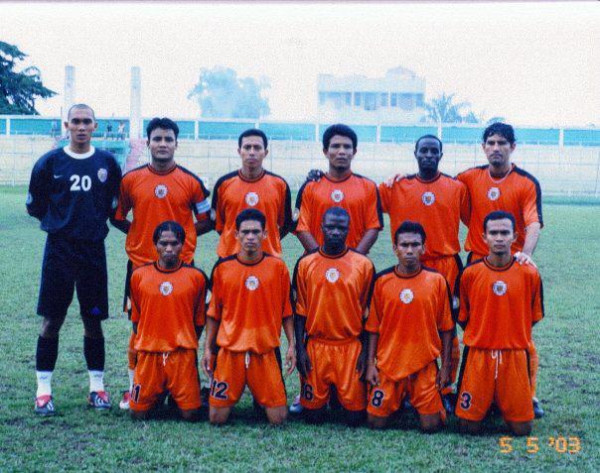
Maulana when he was a player in Persiraja Banda Aceh.

== International career ==
Maulana's debut in the Indonesia national team came in a friendly match against Hongkong on 1 June 2007, which Indonesia won 3–0. He played once in the 2007 AFC Asian Cup, in Indonesia's 1–0 loss against South Korea on 18 July 2007. He participated in PON 2000 in East Java and PON 2004 in Sumatera Selatan.

== Post-playing career ==
In 2018, following his retirement as a player, Maulana became goalkeeping coach at Aceh United.

== Personal life ==
Maulana changed his name in August 2009 after converting to Islam. He was married to famous actress Kiki Amalia in November 2010. However, the marriage did not last long; Maulana filed for divorce in 2012 and they were legally divorced in June 2013.

Ahead of the upcoming 2024 elections, he is preparing himself to enter politics and has joined the PDI-P party. Currently Markus has become a cadre and is registered with the Bandung PDIP party management, he is even ready to compete for the seat of Bandung DPRD (Regional House of Representatives) member from electoral district 6 of Bandung.

== Honours ==
PSMS Medan

- Bang Yos Gold Cup: 2004, 2005, 2006
- Liga Indonesia Premier Division runner up: 2007–08

Indonesia

- AFF Championship runner-up: 2010

Individual

- Man of the match in the Bang Yos Gold Cup 2006 final
