= Irfan Raditya =

Indonesian footballer

Personal information
- Full name: Irfan Raditya
- Date of birth: 12 June 1988 (age 38)
- Place of birth: Medan, Indonesia
- Height: 1.82 m (5 ft 11 1/2 in)
- Position: Centre-back

Senior career*
Years	Team	Apps	(Gls)
2007–2008	Persiraja		
2008–2009	PSDS Deli Serdang		
2009–2011	Arema Indonesia	19	(0)
2011–2012	Arema Indonesia (IPL)		
2012–2013	Pro Duta FC		
2014–2017	Mitra Kukar	0	(0)
2018–2019	Persikabo Bogor	0	(0)

International career
2005	Indonesia U-20		
2011	Indonesia U-23		
- * Club domestic league appearances and goals

Irfan Raditya (born 12 June 1988 in Medan) is an Indonesian former footballer. His former clubs include Arema Indonesia. and the Indonesia national football team. He was recruited from PSDS. He appeared in the national team U-20 at the AFF U-20 Cup in Palembang from 5–19 August 2005.

== Honours ==
Arema Indonesia

- Indonesia Super League: 2009–10
- Piala Indonesia runner-up: 2010
