= Noh Alam Shah =

Singaporean footballer and manager (born 1980)

Personal information
- Full name: Mohd Noh Alam Shah
- Date of birth: 3 September 1980 (age 46)
- Place of birth: Singapore
- Height: 1.78 m (5 ft 10 in)
- Position: Striker

Senior career*
Years	Team	Apps	(Gls)
1997–2000	Sembawang Rangers	14	(3)
2001	Singapore Armed Forces	20	(5)
2001–2002	Sembawang Rangers	47	(19)
2003–2009	Tampines Rovers	162	(84)
2007–2008	→ PDRM (loan)	28	(12)
2009–2011	Arema Indonesia	73	(32)
2012	Persib Bandung	19	(4)
2012	Tampines Rovers	26	(8)
2013	PSS Sleman	11	(2)
2014–2015	Tampines Rovers	37	(7)
Total		437	(172)

International career
2001–2010	Singapore	85	(34)

Managerial career
- 2018: Singapore (assistant)
- 2019–2020: Singapore U23 (assistant)
- 2020–2023: Tanjong Pagar United
- 2024: Tokyo Verdy (training coach)
- 2024–2026: Tanjong Pagar United
- * Club domestic league appearances and goals

Mohd Noh Alam Shah (born 3 September 1980), known as Noh Alam Shah, is a Singaporean football coach and former professional football player. Once regarded as one of the best forwards in South East Asia, Alam Shah was a member of the Singapore national football team when it won the AFF Championship in 2005 and 2007. At club level, he was a player of the Tampines Rovers team which won Singapore's S.League in 2004 and 2005.

Alam Shah is also well known for his volatile temper, which got him into trouble on a number of occasions. An incident of violent conduct when he knocked another player unconscious while playing for Tampines Rovers in the 2007 Singapore Cup final led to a 12-month ban from playing club-level football. The ban was later reduced to 7 months on appeal.

Alam Shah retired from football in 2015 and assisted to manage the Singapore national football team from 2018 to 2020 before managing Tanjong Pagar United in 2020.

Alam Shah holds an AFC ‘A’ Diploma Coaching license.

== Club career ==
=== Tampines Rovers ===
After stints with Sembawang Rangers and the Singapore Armed Forces Football Club (SAFFC), Alam Shah joined Tampines Rovers in 2003. He helped the Stags win the S.League title in 2004 and 2005.

Alam Shah's good form earned him trials with Notts County in England and Skonto Riga in Latvia. However neither trial led to a deal due to work permit issues and language problems respectively.

In 2007, he scored a late goal against Liaoning Guangyuan to become the first player to score 100 goals for the club. The tally came from 88 goals in the league and 12 goals in the domestic cup competitions.

In the 2007 Singapore Cup final between Tampines Rovers and SAFFC, Noh Alam Shah was sent off in the final minutes of the games after an incident involving his fellow national teammate Daniel Bennett. Alam Shah kneed Bennett in the head during a tussle for the ball and, after being dragged away by his teammates, he returned and kicked Bennett in the head. Bennett was knocked unconscious and had to be taken to hospital. Tampines lost the match 4–3. As a result of the incident, the Football Association of Singapore (FAS) Disciplinary Committee, banned Alam Shah from playing in all FAS-sanctioned domestic matches and tournaments for 12 months and fined him S$2,000.

=== PDRM ===
Initially, it was thought that the ban would not prevent Alam Shah from playing at club-level outside Singapore, and he made arrangements to join PDRM of the Malaysia Super League for the 2007 season. However, in January 2008, the Football Association of Malaysia confirmed that under FIFA rules, member associations are required to respect domestic bans imposed by other associations, and therefore Alam Shah would not be eligible to play club-level football in Malaysia until his ban was completed.

On 29 April 2008, Alam Shah appealed successfully to reduce his ban from 12 months to 7 months by the FAS's Disciplinary Committee. Although his was ban was almost halved, he still missed out the remaining three games of Singapore's World Cup 2010 qualifying campaign.

Alam Shah joined PDRM FA on loan upon completion of his ban in June 2008.

=== Return to Tampines Rovers ===
Alam Shah returned to Singapore to play for Tampines Rovers on 29 August 2008 in a S.League match against Gombak United. He scored his first goal after his ban, against Balestier Khalsa, on 11 September 2008.

He ended off his Tampines career with a hat-trick against the then Sengkang Punggol, including a twenty five-yard screamer in the last minute of regulation time.

=== Arema ===
Alam Shah joined Arema in 2009, citing poor attendances at S.League matches that led to poor motivation, and FAS's requirement of passing the fitness test before being allowed to play in a match. One of the reasons given for leaving S.League was that he felt he was given unfair treatment by referees.

On 11 May 2010, Alam Shah was sent off after an on-pitch incident with Persela Lamongan's defender, F.X. Yanuar Wahyu. In the 70th minute, Alam Shah grabbed Yanuar and tried to wrestle him. Yanuar then spun around and knocked Alam Shah down. Both players were sent off. While leaving the pitch, Alam Shah lunged at the Persela players and had to be restrained by teammates and stewards. Arema won the match 2–1 and Alam Shah was subsequently banned for one match.

On 2 March 2011, Alam Shah scored a penalty for Arema against Japanese giants, Cerezo Osaka in a 2011 AFC Champions League group match, thus becoming the first Singaporean footballer to score in the competition for a non-Singapore club.

On 15 June 2011, Alam Shah was offended by a remark from his head coach, Miroslav Janů during a television interview before the match for Arema vs Persisam Putra Samarinda. Alam Shah did not play in the match and after his team returned, he took a golf club and fought with Janů. Assistant coach, Tony Ho and the team players restrained both of them. Janů reasoned Alam Shah did not play in the last five games due to players from Singapore had never participated in the training, perhaps because Alam Shah had not received a salary.

On 5 February 2012, due to a salary dispute, Arema announced that the club had accepted Alam Shah's resignation.

=== Persib Bandung ===
After leaving Arema, Noh Alam Shah joined Persib Bandung. He made 19 appearances and scored 4 goals during his tenure at the club.

=== 3rd stint at Tampines Rovers ===
On 28 June 2012, it was confirmed that Alam Shah will return to defending champions Tampines Rovers, signing a 6 months contract with the club. He scored 5 goals in 14 games. However, after the conclusion of the season he choose not to renew his contract with the club and decided to try his luck playing at Indonesia again.

=== PSS Sleman ===
On 15 February 2013, in the morning it was confirmed that Alam Shah was training in Maguwoharjo Stadium, PSS Sleman home base. He will join ex teammate's that played with him in Arema such as, Budi Sudarsono, Waluyo, Aji Saka, Juan Revi, and Wahyu Gunawan.

Noh Alam Shah recently scored on his League debut with the Indonesian Premier Division club, PSS Sleman on Sunday, 28 April 2013, the match ended 2–0 with Alam Shah scoring both goals in the 32nd and 79th minute. However, during the course of the season, he suffered multiple injuries while playing for the team and hence was released by the club in late-October 2014 ending the season with just 2 goals in 11 games.

=== 4th stint at Tampines Rovers ===
He went back to Tampines Rovers in 2014 and scored 9 league goals in 29 games for the team.

On 10 August 2015, Alam Shah was accused by Brunei DPMM FC head coach Steve Kean of spitting on his face at the end of a tumultuous Singapore Cup clash between Tampines Rovers and the Bruneian side. The striker denied doing so.

On 21 November 2015, Alam Shah was sent off after an on-pitch incident with Harimau Muda goalkeeper, Ilham Amirullah at the last minute. It was the final match for the 2015 S.League season. After receiving a red card, he tried to attack one of the Harimau Muda defenders but was quickly held on by his teammates.

After his career in Tampines Rovers, Noh Alam Shah decided to retire after the 2015 season of S League.

== International career ==
In a 2007 AFF Championship group stage match between Singapore and Laos, Alam Shah scored seven goals in an 11–0 win for Singapore. This seven-goal haul included a bicycle kick. This was the last bicycle kick to be scored at the old National Stadium. This was not only a record win for the Singapore national team, but also a record number of goals scored by an individual player in an 'A' international game for Singapore. Singapore went on to win the championship, and Alam Shah received the 'Most Valuable Player' award for his impressive displays in the tournament.

Alam Shah is also well remembered by Singapore fans for scoring a dramatic late equaliser against Kuwait in the 2002 FIFA World Cup qualifier in 2001, and for scoring in a 2–0 victory over Iraq during the 2007 AFC Asian Cup qualifiers in 2006.

Alam Shah wore the captain's armband in an international friendly against China (National Day Challenge) on 12 August 2009. Singapore drew 1–1 with China PR (losing 3–4 on penalties), with Alam Shah scoring in the 9th minute.

Noh Alam Shah's goals in 2010 came in two matches in the AFC Asian Cup 2011 qualification group stages. He scored in the 1–3 defeat to Iran at the National Stadium in Singapore and in the final group game against Jordan, which Singapore lost 1–2, at the King Abdullah Stadium in Amman.

Following the retirement of national skipper Indra Sahdan in 2010, Alam Shah's name has been going around as one of the favourites to take over Indra's reign as Singapore's captain, mainly due to his influential status within the Singapore camp, along with the passionate displays he has shown on international games.

However, he was later dropped from Radojko Avramović's squad after disappointing performances at the 2010 AFF Championship.

== Managerial career ==
=== National Team ===
In 2017, Alam Shah was appointed as manager for the Singapore Selection team in The Sultan of Selangor's Cup. He was subsequently appointed as team mentor for the national football team for the 2018 AFF Suzuki Cup.

In 2018, Alam Shah was appointed as assistant manager to the Singapore national team.

=== Tanjong Pagar United ===
After FAS announced that Tanjong Pagar United are rejoining Singapore Premier League for the 2020 season, the club announced that Noh Alam Shah was appointed as the team manager.

=== Tokyo Verdy ===
As part of the ‘Coaches Overseas Attachment’ pilot programme by 'Unleash The Roar' football project, Alam Shah alongside Isa Halim embarked on an overseas coaching attachment with Japanese top-flight club Tokyo Verdy of the J1 League. They are the first batch of coaches under the programme where they will be immersed in the day-to-day running of the club. The duo hold an Asian Football Confederation ‘A’ Diploma Coaching license, and will be support coaches for the Japanese team. They have started their overseas coaching attachment with Tokyo Verdy since 24 May 2024 and will be with the club until 10 December 2024.

=== Return to Tanjong Pagar United ===
After completing his coaching attachment with Tokyo Verdy, Tanjong Pagar United confirmed and announced the appointment of Noh Alam Shah as an interim head coach on 2 January 2025. On 17 July 2026, Tanjong Pagar United announced that Noh Alam Shah have mutually agreed to part ways with the club, bringing his tenure with the jaguars to an end after 6 years.

== Personal life ==
On 20 August 2015, Alam Shah was spotted driving for Grab.

After retirement from football, Alam Shah works as operations executive at the car rental department of Komoco Motors under former Tampines Rovers chairman and current managing director of Komoco Motors, the sole distributor of Hyundai cars in Singapore, Teo Hock Seng, whom he has described as a second father.

Back in the days as a Tampines Rovers chairman, Teo Hock Seng signed Alam Shah from Sembawang Rangers in 2002 despite the player's reputation as a hothead and has always been there for the striker through various disciplinary issues and controversies that plagued his career.

== Honours ==
=== Club ===
Tampines Rovers

- S.League: 2004, 2005, 2012
- Singapore Cup: 2004, 2006

PDRM

- Malaysia Premier League: 2007

Arema Indonesia

- Indonesia Super League: 2009–10
- Piala Indonesia runner-up: 2010

PSS Sleman

- Indonesian Premier Division: 2013

=== International ===
Singapore

- AFF Championship: 2004, 2007

=== Individual ===
- S.League Player of the Year: 2005
- AFF Championship Most Valuable Player: 2007
- AFF Championship top scorer: 2007
- Former of AFF Championship overall top scorer with 17 goals
- Ranked fourth in World's Top Goal Scorer by the International Federation of Football History & Statistics : 2007

== Career statistics ==
=== International ===
Appearances and goals by national team and year
National team	Year	Apps	Goals
Singapore	1999	1	0
Singapore	2000	–	
Singapore	2001	4	1
Singapore	2002	11	1
Singapore	2003	9	2
Singapore	2004	11	3
Singapore	2005	5	5
Singapore	2006	13	3
Singapore	2007	13	12
Singapore	2008	7	2
Singapore	2009	6	3
Singapore	2010	5	2
Total		85	34

Scores and results list Myanmar's goal tally first, score column indicates score after each Alam Shah goal.

List of international goals scored by Noh Alam Shah
No.	Date	Venue	Opponent	Score	Result	Competition
1	6 February 2001	National Stadium, Kallang, Singapore	Kuwait	1–1	1–1	2002 FIFA World Cup qualification
2	20 December 2002	National Stadium, Kallang, Singapore	Laos	1–0	2–1	2002 AFF Championship
3	25 March 2003	Jalan Besar Stadium, Kallang, Singapore	Pakistan	3–0	3–0	2004 AFC Asian Cup qualification
4	19 October 2003	Jalan Besar Stadium, Kallang, Singapore	Palestine	2–0	2–0	2004 AFC Asian Cup qualification
5	4 September 2004	Jalan Besar Stadium, Kallang, Singapore	Indonesia	1–0	2–0	Friendly
6	27 November 2004	Jalan Besar Stadium, Kallang, Singapore	Myanmar	1–0	1–0	Friendly
7	29 December 2004	Kuala Lumpur Stadium, Kuala Lumpur, Malaysia	Myanmar	3–2	4–3	2004 AFF Championship
8	2 January 2005	National Stadium, Kallang, Singapore	Myanmar	2–2	4–2	2004 AFF Championship
9	2 January 2005	National Stadium, Kallang, Singapore	Myanmar	3–2	4–2	2004 AFF Championship
10	4 June 2005	National Stadium, Kallang, Singapore	Malaysia	1–0	2–0	2005 Causeway Cup
11	4 June 2005	National Stadium, Kallang, Singapore	Malaysia	2–0	2–0	2005 Causeway Cup
12	8 June 2004	City Stadium, George Town, Malaysia	Malaysia	1–0	2–1	Friendly
13	15 February 2006	Hong Kong Stadium, Causeway Bay, Hong Kong	Hong Kong	1–1	1–1	Friendly
14	22 February 2006	National Stadium, Kallang, Singapore	Iraq	2–0	2–0	2007 AFC Asian Cup qualification
15	12 August 2006	Hong Kong Stadium, Causeway Bay, Hong Kong	Hong Kong	1–0	2–1	Friendly
16	15 January 2007	National Stadium, Kallang, Singapore	Laos	2–0	2–2	2007 AFF Championship
17	15 January 2007	National Stadium, Kallang, Singapore	Laos	3–0	2–2	2007 AFF Championship
18	15 January 2007	National Stadium, Kallang, Singapore	Laos	5–0	2–2	2007 AFF Championship
19	15 January 2007	National Stadium, Kallang, Singapore	Laos	7–0	2–2	2007 AFF Championship
20	15 January 2007	National Stadium, Kallang, Singapore	Laos	8–0	2–2	2007 AFF Championship
21	15 January 2007	National Stadium, Kallang, Singapore	Laos	10–0	2–2	2007 AFF Championship
22	15 January 2007	National Stadium, Kallang, Singapore	Laos	11–0	2–2	2007 AFF Championship
23	17 January 2007	National Stadium, Kallang, Singapore	Indonesia	1–0	2–2	2007 AFF Championship
24	23 January 2007	Shah Alam Stadium, Shah Alam, Malaysia	Malaysia	1–1	1–1	2007 AFF Championship
25	31 January 2007	National Stadium, Kallang, Singapore	Thailand	1–0	2–1	2007 AFF Championship
26	8 October 2007	Suheim bin Hamad Stadium, Doha, Qatar	Palestine	4–0	4–0	2010 FIFA World Cup qualification
27	18 November 2007	Central Stadium, Dushanbe, Tajikistan	Tajikistan	1–1	1–1	2010 FIFA World Cup qualification
28	5 December 2008	Gelora Bung Karno Stadium, Jakarta, Indonesia	Cambodia	5–0	5–0	2008 AFF Championship
29	7 December 2008	Gelora Bung Karno Stadium, Jakarta, Indonesia	Myanmar	1–0	3–1	2008 AFF Championship
30	28 January 2009	National Stadium, Kallang, Singapore	Jordan	2–1	2–1	2011 AFC Asian Cup qualification
31	12 August 2009	National Stadium, Kallang, Singapore	China	1–0	1–1	2009 National Day Challenge
32	4 November 2009	National Stadium, Kallang, Singapore	Indonesia	2–1	3–1	Friendly
33	6 January 2010	National Stadium, Kallang, Singapore	Iran	1–2	1–3	2011 AFC Asian Cup qualification
34	3 March 2010	King Abdullah II Stadium, Amman, Jordan	Jordan	1–1	1–2	2011 AFC Asian Cup qualification

Sporting positions
Preceded by Indra Sahdan Daud	Singapore national team captain 2010	Succeeded by Shahril Ishak
