= Muhammad Fakhrudin =

Indonesian footballer

Personal information
- Full name: Muhammad Fakhrudin
- Date of birth: 14 April 1982 (age 44)
- Place of birth: Sidoarjo, Indonesia
- Height: 1.70 m (5 ft 7 in)
- Positions: Attacking midfielder; winger

Team information
- Current team: PSM Makassar

Senior career*
Years	Team	Apps	(Gls)
2003–2004	Deltras Sidoarjo		(1)
2005–2006	Persegi Gianyar		(7)
2006	Persiba Balikpapan		(0)
2007–2008	Persijap Jepara	30	(4)
2008–2009	Persisam Putra Samarinda	18	(4)
2009–2011	Arema Indonesia	40	(9)
2011–2012	Deltras	27	(6)
2012–2013	Sriwijaya	10	(1)
2014–2016	Persik Kediri	27	(3)
2017	Persida Sidoarjo	11	(5)
- * Club domestic league appearances and goals

Muhammad Fakhrudin (born 14 April 1982) is an Indonesian former professional footballer who plays as an attacking midfielder or winger. Previously he played for Sriwijaya.

== Honours ==
Persisam Putra Samarinda

- Liga Indonesia Premier Division: 2008–09

Arema Indonesia

- Indonesia Super League: 2009–10
- Piala Indonesia runner-up: 2010

Sriwijaya

- Indonesian Inter Island Cup: 2012
