= Pierre Njanka =

Cameroonian footballer

Personal information
- Full name: Pierre Djaka Njanka-Beyaka
- Date of birth: 15 March 1975 (age 51)
- Place of birth: Douala, Cameroon
- Height: 1.81 m (5 ft 11 in)
- Position: Defender

Senior career*
Years	Team	Apps	(Gls)
1993	Tigre Douala		
1994	Rail Douala		
1995–1998	Olympic Mvolyé	87	(1)
1999	Neuchâtel Xamax	24	(0)
2000–2003	Strasbourg	54	(0)
2002	Strasbourg B	5	(0)
2003–2005	Sedan	52	(0)
2006	Istres	14	(0)
2006	Stade Tunisien	5	(0)
2006–2007	Club Africain	26	(0)
2007–2008	Al-Wehda		
2008–2009	Persija Jakarta	27	(0)
2009–2010	Arema Indonesia	38	(10)
2010–2011	Aceh United	12	(2)
2011–2012	Mitra Kukar	11	(1)
2012–2013	Persisam Putra Samarinda	29	(2)

International career
1994–2004	Cameroon	47	(2)
Medal record
Men's football
Representing Cameroon
Africa Cup of Nations
Winner	2000 Ghana-Nigeria
FIFA Confederations Cup
Runner-up	2003 France
- * Club domestic league appearances and goals

Pierre Djaka Njanka-Beyaka (born 15 March 1975) is a Cameroonian former professional footballer who played as a defender.

Njanka previously played for Strasbourg, Sedan and Istres in the French Ligue 1 and Ligue 2. While at Strasbourg, he played in the 2001 Coupe de France final, in which they beat Amiens on penalties. Njanka had a trial with English Premier League side Sunderland in July 2000, playing in a pre-season match against KV Mechelen. He was also set to join Portsmouth in 2001, but a knee injury ended the move prematurely.

Njanka won the 2000 African Cup of Nations with Cameroon and played for his country at the 1998 and 2002 FIFA World Cups. He was capped 47 times and scored twice for Cameroon, including a goal against Austria at the 1998 World Cup.

== Honours ==
Strasbourg

- Coupe de France: 2000–01

Arema Indonesia

- Indonesia Super League: 2009–10

Cameroon

- African Cup of Nations: 2000
- FIFA Confederations Cup runner-up: 2003
