= Juan Revi =

Indonesian footballer (born 1986)

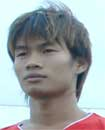
- Revi with Arema in 2010

Personal information
- Full name: Juan Revi Auriqto
- Date of birth: 4 June 1986 (age 40)
- Place of birth: Surabaya, Indonesia
- Height: 1.76 m (5 ft 9 in)
- Position: Defensive midfielder

Youth career
- 2004: Persema Malang

Senior career*
Years	Team	Apps	(Gls)
2005–2008	Persikoba Batu	27	(0)
2008–2009	Deltras Sidoarjo	20	(0)
2009–2011	Arema Indonesia	44	(0)
2011–2012	Deltras Sidoarjo	13	(1)
2012–2013	PSS Sleman	15	(3)
2014–2016	Arema Cronus	40	(0)
2016–2017	Persela Lamongan	14	(0)
2017–2019	Arema FC	2	(0)
2018	→ Semen Padang (loan)	4	(0)
2019	Persik Kediri	8	(0)
2020	PS Hizbul Wathan Sidoarjo	1	(0)
Total		188	(4)

International career
2013	Indonesia	1	(0)
- * Club domestic league appearances and goals

Juan Revi Auriqto (born 4 June 1986) is an Indonesian former footballer who played as a defensive midfielder. He is of Chinese descent.

== Honours ==
Arema

- Indonesia Super League: 2009–10
- East Java Governor Cup: 2013
- Indonesian Inter Island Cup: 2014/15
- Piala Indonesia runner-up: 2010

Persik Kediri

- Liga 2: 2019
