= Tommy Pranata =

Indonesian footballer

Personal information
- Full name: Tommy Pranata
- Date of birth: 25 December 1982 (age 43)
- Place of birth: Padang, Indonesia
- Height: 1.73 m (5 ft 8 in)
- Position: Midfielder

Senior career*
Years	Team	Apps	(Gls)
2002–2006	PSDS Deli Serdang	32	(2)
2006–2008	PSMS Medan	25	(1)
2008–2009	Persisam Samarinda	12	(0)
2009–2012	Arema Indonesia	24	(1)
2012	Persema Malang	18	(0)
2013	PSLS Lhokseumawe	9	(1)
2014	Perseta Tulungagung	4	(0)
2014–2015	PSBK Blitar	2	(0)
2015–2017	PSS Sleman	31	(2)
Total		157	(7)

International career
2005	Indonesia U-23		
- * Club domestic league appearances and goals

Tommy Pranata (born in Padang, West Sumatra, 25 December 1982) is an Indonesian former footballer who plays as a midfielder.

== Honours ==
PSMS Medan

- Liga Indonesia Premier Division runner up: 2007–08

Persisam Samarinda

- Liga Indonesia Premier Division: 2008–09

Arema Indonesia

- Indonesia Super League: 2009–10
- Piala Indonesia runner-up: 2010
