= Rachmat Afandi =

Indonesian footballer

Rachmat Affandi
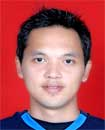
- Affandi with Arema in 2010

Personal information
- Full name: Rachmat Affandi
- Date of birth: 5 April 1984 (age 42)
- Place of birth: Jakarta, Indonesia
- Height: 1.72 m (5 ft 7 1/2 in)
- Position: Striker

Youth career
- SSB Tunas Betawi
- 1997: Pelita Jaya
- Persija Jakarta

Senior career*
Years	Team	Apps	(Gls)
2002–2003	Persija Jakarta	7	(0)
2003–2004	Persebaya Surabaya	8	(1)
2004–2006	Pelita Krakatau Steel	17	(4)
2006–2007	Persibom Bolaang	8	(1)
2007–2008	Persikabo Bogor	9	(1)
2008–2009	PSMS Medan	25	(7)
2009–2010	Arema Indonesia	23	(2)
2010–2011	Persib Bandung	20	(3)
2011–2014	Persija Jakarta	66	(12)
2014–2015	Mitra Kukar	16	(8)
2016	Persija Jakarta	14	(0)
2017	Persita Tangerang	8	(1)
2018	Semen Padang	9	(0)
Total		230	(40)

International career
2000	Indonesia U16		
2001–2003	Indonesia U19		
2002	Indonesia U21	5	(2)
2005–2007	Indonesia U23		
- * Club domestic league appearances and goals

Rachmat Affandi (born 5 April 1984) is an Indonesian former professional footballer who plays as a striker.

== Career ==
On 12 December 2014, he moved to Mitra Kukar.

== Honours ==
=== Club ===
Arema Indonesia

- Indonesia Super League: 2009–10
- Piala Indonesia runner-up: 2010

=== Country ===
Indonesia U-21

- Hassanal Bolkiah Trophy: 2002
