= Kurnia Meiga =

Indonesian footballer

Personal information
- Full name: Kurnia Meiga Hermansyah
- Date of birth: 7 May 1990 (age 36)
- Place of birth: Jakarta, Indonesia
- Height: 1.88 m (6 ft 2 in)
- Position: Goalkeeper

Youth career
- 2004−2005: Diklat Ragunan
- 2006: Persindra Indramayu
- 2007: Persijap Jepara

Senior career*
Years	Team	Apps	(Gls)
2008−2017	Arema	280	(0)

International career
2007−2008	Indonesia U19	4	(0)
2008	Indonesia U21	4	(0)
2009−2013	Indonesia U23	24	(0)
2013−2017	Indonesia	20	(0)
Medal record
Men's football
Representing Indonesia
Southeast Asian Games
Silver medal – second place	2011 Jakarta & Palembang
Silver medal – second place	2013 Naypyidaw
Islamic Solidarity Games
Silver medal – second place	2013 Palembang
ASEAN Football Championship
Runner-up	2010 Indonesia & Vietnam
Runner-up	2016 Myanmar & Philippines
- * Club domestic league appearances and goals

Kurnia Meiga Hermansyah (born 7 May 1990) is an Indonesian former footballer who played as a goalkeeper. He is also the younger brother of the late Achmad Kurniawan.

== Club career ==
In 2008-09 Indonesia Super League he received 12 months of sanctions and Rp. 30 million fine from the Football Association of Indonesia, which was reduced later to five months and Rp. 30 million fine, related to the incident against Bontang. In 2009-2010, he was crowned as the best player to set aside the names like Aldo Barreto, Cristian Gonzáles, and Ricardo Salampessy.

In 2017 Liga 1 middle season, he had to go out of action from football due to being diagnosed with Papilledema.

== International career ==
Meiga first called up for senior team in 2010 AFF Suzuki Cup as third choice goalkeeper behind Markus Haris Maulana and Ferry Rotinsulu. He received his senior debut against Saudi Arabia in 2015 AFC Asian Cup qualification and he conceded 2 goals. Later he made his second caps against Netherlands he made some brilliant saves at first half before he conceded 3 goals by Siem de Jong twice and Arjen Robben.

== Career statistics ==
=== International ===
Appearances and goals by national team and year
National team	Year	Apps	Goals
Indonesia	2013	2	0
Indonesia	2014	8	0
Indonesia	2015	0	0
Indonesia	2016	8	0
Indonesia	2017	2	0
Total		20	0

== Honours ==
Arema

- Indonesia Super League: 2009–10
- East Java Governor Cup: 2013
- Menpora Cup: 2013
- Indonesian Inter Island Cup: 2014/15
- Indonesia President's Cup: 2017
- Piala Indonesia runner-up: 2010

Indonesia U23

- SEA Games silver medal: 2011, 2013
- Islamic Solidarity Games silver medal: 2013

Indonesia

- AFF Championship runner-up: 2010, 2016

Individual

- Indonesia Super League Best Player: 2009–10
- AFF Championship Best Goalkeeper: 2016
- AFF Championship Best XI : 2016
- ASEAN Football Federation Best XI: 2017
