= Ridhuan Muhammad =

Singaporean footballer

Personal information
- Full name: Muhammad Ridhuan bin Muhammad
- Date of birth: 6 May 1984 (age 42)
- Place of birth: Singapore
- Height: 1.77 m (5 ft 10 in)
- Position: Right winger

Team information
- Current team: Tanjong Pagar United youth (Head Coach)

Youth career
- 2000–2002: National Football Academy

Senior career*
Years	Team	Apps	(Gls)
2003−2006	Young Lions	79	(6)
2007−2009	Tampines Rovers	77	(10)
2009−2014	Arema Malang	90	(24)
2013–2014	→ Putra Samarinda (loan)	12	(0)
2014–2015	Geylang International	24	(4)
2015–2016	Tampines Rovers	5	(0)
2016–2017	Warriors	29	(5)
2018	Borneo Samarinda	10	(0)
2021	Tanjong Pagar United	4	(0)
Total		330	(49)

International career
2003−2010	Singapore	68	(3)

Managerial career
- 2021–: Tanjong Pagar United (youth)
- * Club domestic league appearances and goals

Muhammad Ridhuan bin Muhammad (born 6 May 1984) is a Singaporean former footballer who last played as a right-back for Singapore Premier League club Tanjong Pagar United. Mainly a right-back, Ridhuan has also played as defensive-midfielder and occasionally a winger or striker when called upon.

== Club career ==
Ridhuan started playing football at the Milo Soccer School. Ridhuan was part of the pioneer batch at the National Football Academy that was set up in 2000.

=== Young Lions ===
Ridhuan started his career with S.League clubs Young Lions. First catching the eye for the national U18 team with his speed and mazy dribbling skills, he joined the Young Lions for the 2003 S.League season.

=== Tampines Rovers ===
In 2007, Tampines Rovers head coach Vorawan Chitavanich offered Ridhuan to play at Tampines Rovers which he accepted.

=== Arema Malang ===
In 2009, Ridhuan was in the midst of discussion with Indonesian club Persib Bandung when fellow national footballer, Noh Alam Shah, invited him to join Arema Malang. Ridhuan eventually signed with Arema and spent three and a half season with Arema and helped Arema to win the 2009–10 Indonesian Super League title.

==== Putra Samrinda (loan) ====
In 2013, Ridhuan also spent half a season on loan at Putra Samarinda. He was wildly popular during his time in Indonesia and was often referred to as R6, a moniker of Cristiano Ronaldo's CR7. However due to a possible ban by FIFA on football activities in Indonesia, Ridhuan left the club and returned to Singapore.

=== Geylang International ===
With a FIFA ban looming on all Indonesian footballing activities, Ridhuan moved back to Singapore with Geylang International after his 4-year sojourn.

=== Tampines Rovers ===
Following his release by Tampines Rovers at the conclusion of the 2015 S.League season, Ridhuan announced his retirement from football to forge a new career in the oil and gas industry following his failure to secure a contract.

=== Warriors ===
However, the speedy winger was snapped up by Warriors just before the start of the 2016 S.League season and made his debut as a substitute in a 3–1 loss against DPMM. He scored his first goal of the season in a 2–2 draw against Geylang International to rescue a point for the Warriors after coming on as a substitute. He repaid the faith that the Warriors had shown him by accumulating a total of four goals and six assists in all competitions. His performances for the Warriors was rewarded with a contract extension for the 2017 S.League season.

=== Borneo Samarinda ===
Ridhuan planned to end his footballing career in Indonesia and signed a one month deal with Borneo Samarinda in early 2018 to participate in a tournament. After his contract ended, Warriors contacted Ridhuan to sign him back to the club but was rejected by him.

=== Tanjong Pagar United ===
On 13 January 2021, Tanjong Pagar United has announced that they have signed Ridhuan for the 2021 season. This marks him coming out of retirement from football since 2018. On 10 October 2021, Ridhuan retired from football after a season with the Jaguars, making four appearances for the club.

== Managerial career ==
=== Tanjong Pagar United Youth ===
On 28 December 2021, Tanjong Pagar United has announced that Ridhuan will be a part of the coaching team. He will coach the club’s U15 team.

== International career ==
While Ridhuan did not feature much in the league, Singapore coach Radojko Avramović saw something in the talented youngster and gave him his international debut against Qatar on 19 November 2003.

With midfielder Shahril Ishak, defender Baihakki Khaizan and keeper Hassan Sunny, he is part of the 'NFA Gang of Four', the quartet which has played together since their early teenage years and earned senior international honours in 2003.

He was also part of the national side that won the 2004 AFF Championship albeit only featuring in the opening game. Three years later in the 2007 AFF Championship, he played a major role in the team's success in retaining the championship.

As of December 2017, Ridhuan has amassed 68 caps for Singapore.

== Personal life ==
Ridhuan went to Hong Kah Primary and Secondary School. Apart from playing football, he owns a home based barber service called 1E_Xpress. Amongst his clients was his former lions teammates Baihakki Khaizan, Khairul Amri, Noh Alam Shah and Shahril Ishak.

== National team career statistics ==
=== Goals for Senior National Team ===
Scores and results list Nigeria's goal tally first.

#	Date	Venue	Opponent	Score	Result	Competition
1	15 January 2007	National Stadium, Kallang, Singapore	Laos	1–0	11–0	2007 AFF Championship
2	27 January 2007	National Stadium, Kallang, Singapore	Malaysia	1–1	1–1 (5–4 p)	2007 AFF Championship
3	24 June 2007	National Stadium, Kallang, Singapore	North Korea	1–0	2–1	Friendly

== Honours ==
=== Club ===
Arema Malang

- Indonesia Super League: 2009–10
- Piala Indonesia runner-up: 2010

Warriors

- Singapore FA Cup: 2017

=== International ===
Singapore

- AFF Championship: 2004, 2007
