= Waluyo =

Indonesian footballer

Personal information
- Full name: Waluyo Hartono
- Date of birth: 30 September 1983 (age 43)
- Place of birth: Banyumas, Indonesia
- Height: 1.70 m (5 ft 7 in)
- Position: Defender

Senior career*
Years	Team	Apps	(Gls)
2003–2005	Persibas Banyumas	20	(0)
2006–2008	Deltras Sidoarjo	28	(0)
2008–2009	Persib Bandung	12	(0)
2009–2011	Arema Indonesia	27	(0)
2011–2012	Deltras	27	(0)
2013–2014	PSS Sleman	14	(0)
2015–2016	Pelita Bandung Raya	3	(0)
2016–2017	PSS Sleman	27	(3)
2022–2025	Persitema Temanggung	14	(0)
Total		172	(3)

International career
2005	Indonesia U23		
- * Club domestic league appearances and goals

Waluyo Hartono (born 30 September 1983) is an Indonesian former footballer who plays as a defender.

== Honours ==
Arema Indonesia

- Indonesia Super League: 2009–10
- Piala Indonesia runner-up: 2010

PSS Sleman

- Indonesia Soccer Championship B: 2016
