= Roman Chmelo =

Slovak footballer

Personal information
- Date of birth: 9 September 1980 (age 46)
- Place of birth: Nová Baňa, Czechoslovakia
- Height: 1.75 m (5 ft 9 in)
- Position: Midfielder

Senior career*
Years	Team	Apps	(Gls)
1999–2002	Slovan Levice	79	(32)
2003–2007	PKNS	133	(68)
2007–2009	Dunajská Streda	13	(0)
2009–2012	Arema Indonesia	145	(75)
2012–2013	HFK Olomouc	20	(9)
2013	PKNS	25	(4)
2014	PSM Makassar	3	(0)
2015	KFC Kalná nad Hronom		
- * Club domestic league appearances and goals

Roman Chmelo (born 9 September 1980) is a Slovak footballer who plays mainly as midfielder. He played for Arema in Indonesia and FK DAC 1904 Dunajská Streda in the Slovak First Football League.

== Honours ==
Arema Indonesia

- Indonesia Super League: 2009–10
- Piala Indonesia runner-up: 2010
