= Aji Saka (footballer) =

Indonesian footballer

Aji saka
Personal information
- Full name: Aji Saka
- Date of birth: 23 February 1991 (age 35)
- Place of birth: Malang, Indonesia
- Height: 1.78 m (5 ft 10 in)
- Position: Goalkeeper

Youth career
- 2006–2009: Arema Indonesia

Senior career*
Years	Team	Apps	(Gls)
2008–2013	Arema Indonesia	17	(0)
2013	PSS Sleman	16	(0)
2014	Persepam Madura United	1	(0)
2014–2016	Gresik United	7	(0)
2016	Persis Solo		
2017	Gresik United		

International career
2009	Indonesia U-19		
2012	Indonesia U-21	3	(0)
2012–2014	Indonesia U-23	6	(0)
- * Club domestic league appearances and goals

Aji Saka (born in Malang, East Java, 23 February 1991) is an Indonesian former footballer.

== Honours ==
Arema Indonesia

- Indonesia Super League: 2009–10
- Piala Indonesia runner-up: 2010
