= Ronny Firmansyah =

Indonesian footballer (born 1981)

Personal information
- Full name: Ronny Firmansyah
- Date of birth: 4 May 1981 (age 45)
- Place of birth: Pasuruan, Indonesia
- Height: 1.71 m (5 ft 7 1/2 in)
- Position: Midfielder

Senior career*
| Years | Team | Apps | (Gls) |
| 2004 | Persela Lamongan | ? | (?) |
| 2005 | Persegi Gianyar | ? | (?) |
| 2006 | Persmin Minahasa | ? | (?) |
| 2007–2012 | Arema Indonesia | 32 | (3) |
| 2012 | PSMS Medan (IPL) | 2 | (0) |
| 2012–2013 | Persiwa Wamena | ? | (?) |
| 2014–2018 | Persik Kediri | ? | (?) |
- * Club domestic league appearances and goals

Ronny Firmansyah (born in Pasuruan, East Java, 4 May 1981) is an Indonesian former footballer who plays as a midfielder.

== Honours ==
Arema Indonesia

- Indonesia Super League: 2009–10
- Piala Indonesia runner-up: 2010

Persik Kediri

- Liga 3: 2018
