= Hermawan =

Indonesian footballer

Personal information
- Full name: Hermawan
- Date of birth: 9 May 1983 (age 43)
- Place of birth: Malang, Indonesia
- Height: 1.72 m (5 ft 7 1/2 in)
- Position: Defender

Youth career
- 2001: Arema U-18

Senior career*
| Years | Team | Apps | (Gls) |
| 2002–2005 | Arema Malang | 45 | (5) |
| 2006–2007 | Pelita Jaya | 16 | (0) |
| 2007–2008 | Persela Lamongan | 17 | (0) |
| 2008–2009 | Deltras Sidoarjo | 11 | (0) |
| 2009–2011 | Arema Indonesia | 10 | (0) |
| 2011–2013 | Arema Indonesia (IPL) | 32 | (0) |
| 2014–2015 | Pelita Bandung Raya | 23 | (0) |
| 2015–2016 | Arema Cronus | 25 | (0) |
| 2016 | Persib Bandung | 10 | (0) |
| 2016–2019 | Persiba Balikpapan | 9 | (0) |
| 2019–2020 | Madura | 19 | (0) |
| Total | | 217 | (5) |

International career
| 2002 | Indonesia U-21 | | |
| 2005 | Indonesia U-23 | | |
- * Club domestic league appearances and goals

Hermawan (born 9 May 1983) is an Indonesian former footballer who played as a defender.

== Honours ==
Arema Indonesia

- Liga Indonesia First Division: 2004
- Indonesia Super League: 2009–10
- Piala Indonesia runner-up: 2010

Indonesia U-21

- Hassanal Bolkiah Trophy : 2002
