= 2025–26 Liga 4 Special Region of Jakarta =

2025–26 Liga 4 DKI Jakarta
2025–26 Liga 4 DKI Jakarta Governor's Cup

Tournament details
- Country: Indonesia
- Venue: 5
- Dates: 26 March – 10 April 2026
- Teams: 22

Final positions
- Champions: ASIOP
- Runners-up: Jaksel
- Third place: Villa 2000 B
- Fourth place: Jakarta United

The 2025–26 Liga 4 DKI Jakarta (also known as the 2025–26 Liga 4 DKI Jakarta Governor's Cup for sponsorship reasons) is the eighth season of the Liga 4 DKI Jakarta organized by the Asprov PSSI DKI Jakarta.

The competition serves as the provincial qualifying round for the 2025–26 Liga 4 national phase. A total of 22 teams are competing for three available slots to represent the Special Region of Jakarta in the national phase.

== Background ==
Following the restructuring of the Indonesian football pyramid by PSSI, the former Liga 3 provincial series has been rebranded as Liga 4. For the 2025–26 season, the Jakarta regional branch launched the competition under the Governor's Cup (Indonesian: Piala Gubernur) banner to increase prestige and support for local football development. This season also marks the return of competitive semi-professional football in the capital with a more structured format to ensure a path to the national phase.

== Teams ==
=== Location map ===
Location of teams of the 2025–26 Liga 4 Special Region of Jakarta.
Location of teams of the 2025–26 Liga 4 Special Region of Jakarta (Tangerang and South Tangerang).
Location of teams of the 2025–26 Liga 4 Special Region of Jakarta (Bekasi).

=== Participating teams ===
No	Team	District	City	2024–25 season
Jakarta teams
1	Jakarta City	Rawa Badak	North Jakarta	Quarter-finals
2	Persija Barat	Cengkareng	West Jakarta	First round (4th in Group B)
3	Trisakti	Gunung Putri, at Bogor Regency	West Jakarta	First round (3rd in Group B)
4	UMS 1905	Taman Sari	West Jakarta	First round (4th in Group C)
5	ASIOP	Cempaka Putih	Central Jakarta	Runner-up
6	Bina Mutiara	Tebet, at South Jakarta	Central Jakarta	First round (2nd in Group E)
7	MC Utama	Sawah Besar	Central Jakarta	First round (4th in Group A)
8	Persija Muda	Pulomas, at East Jakarta	Central Jakarta	First round (3rd in Group D)
9	Putra Indonesia	Kemayoran	Central Jakarta	First round (3rd in Group F)
10	ABC Wirayudha	Cijantung	East Jakarta	First round (3rd in Group C)
11	Bina Taruna	Rawamangun	East Jakarta	First round (3rd in Group A)
12	Bintang Kranggan	Kranggan	East Jakarta	First round (4th in Group D)
13	Jakarta United	Rawamangun	East Jakarta	Fourth place
14	PS Pemuda Jaya	Klender	East Jakarta	First round (3rd in Group E)
15	Taruna Persada	Ceger	East Jakarta	First round (2nd in Group F)
16	Urakan	Kampung Gedong	East Jakarta	Quarter-finals
17	Betawi	Jagakarsa	South Jakarta	Quarter-finals
18	Jaksel	Blok S	South Jakarta	Quarter-finals
19	PRO-Direct	Lebak Bulus	South Jakarta	—
Non-Jakarta teams
20	Bintang Kota	Batuceper	Tangerang	First round (2nd in Group A)
21	Taruma	Babelan	Bekasi Regency	First round (2nd in Group C)
22	Villa 2000 B	Pamulang	South Tangerang	—

== Format ==
The competition is divided into two main stages:

- Group stage: 22 teams are divided into six groups (Groups A–F). Groups A to D consist of 4 teams each, while Groups E and F consist of 3 teams each.
- Knockout stage: The top two teams from each group, along with the four best third-placed teams, advance to the Round of 16.

== Schedule ==
The competition is held on a condensed schedule to accommodate the national phase timeline:

- Group stage: 26 March – 31 March 2026
- Round of 16: 2 April – 3 April 2026
- Quarter-finals: 5 April 2026
- Semi-finals: 7 April 2026
- Final and Third place play-off: 10 April 2026

== Venues ==
The matches are mainly held in four locations in Jakarta, namely:

- Soemantri Brodjonegoro Stadium, South Jakarta
- Pancoran Soccer Field, South Jakarta
- Tugu Stadium, North Jakarta
- Gelora Bung Karno Madya Stadium, South Jakarta (Final and Third place play-off)
- Ingub Klender Field, East Jakarta (reserve venue)

== Group stage ==
=== Group A ===
Pos	Team	Pld	W	D	L	GF	GA	GD	Pts	
1	Jaksel	3	3	0	0	10	2	+8	9	Qualification to knockout stage
2	Jakarta United	3	1	1	1	12	3	+9	4	Qualification to knockout stage
3	Bintang Kranggan	3	1	1	1	5	3	+2	4	Qualification to knockout stage
4	Putra Indonesia	3	0	0	3	1	20	−19	0	

Source: Radar Solo

=== Group B ===
Pos	Team	Pld	W	D	L	GF	GA	GD	Pts	
1	Persija Barat	3	3	0	0	7	2	+5	9	Qualification to knockout stage
2	Bina Mutiara	3	2	0	1	7	3	+4	6	Qualification to knockout stage
3	Taruma	3	1	0	2	4	5	−1	3	Qualification to knockout stage
4	Trisakti	3	0	0	3	1	9	−8	0	

Source: Radar Solo

=== Group C ===
Pos	Team	Pld	W	D	L	GF	GA	GD	Pts	
1	PRO-Direct	3	2	1	0	10	1	+9	7	Qualification to knockout stage
2	PS Pemuda Jaya	3	1	1	1	4	10	−6	4	Qualification to knockout stage
3	Taruna Persada	3	1	0	2	2	4	−2	3	Qualification to knockout stage
4	Persija Muda	3	0	2	1	3	4	−1	2	

Source: Radar Solo

=== Group D ===
Pos	Team	Pld	W	D	L	GF	GA	GD	Pts	
1	ASIOP	3	3	0	0	19	1	+18	9	Qualification to knockout stage
2	MC Utama	3	2	0	1	4	2	+2	6	Qualification to knockout stage
3	Urakan	3	1	0	2	3	14	−11	3	Qualification to knockout stage
4	Jakarta City	3	0	0	3	2	11	−9	0	

Source: Radar Solo

=== Group E ===
Pos	Team	Pld	W	D	L	GF	GA	GD	Pts	
1	Bintang Kota	2	2	0	0	9	3	+6	6	Qualification to knockout stage
2	Bina Taruna	2	1	0	1	10	5	+5	3	Qualification to knockout stage
3	UMS 1905	2	0	0	2	1	12	−11	0	

Source: Radar Solo

=== Group F ===
Pos	Team	Pld	W	D	L	GF	GA	GD	Pts	
1	ABC Wirayudha	2	2	0	0	8	3	+5	6	Qualification to knockout stage
2	Villa 2000 B	2	1	0	1	3	3	0	3	Qualification to knockout stage
3	Betawi	2	0	0	2	3	8	−5	0	

Source: Radar Solo

==== Ranking of third-placed teams ====
Because some groups have a different number of teams, results against the fourth-placed teams are not considered for this ranking.

Pos	Grp	Team	Pld	W	D	L	GF	GA	GD	Pts	
1	A	Bintang Kranggan	2	1	1	0	5	3	+2	4	Qualification to knockout stage
2	C	Taruna Persada	2	1	0	1	1	2	−1	3	Qualification to knockout stage
3	B	Taruma	2	0	0	2	2	4	−2	0	Qualification to knockout stage
4	D	Urakan	2	0	0	2	1	4	−3	0	Qualification to knockout stage
5	F	Betawi	2	0	0	2	3	8	−5	0	
6	E	UMS 1905	2	0	0	2	1	12	−11	0	

Source: PSSI Jakarta

== Knockout stage ==
The knockout stage features the 16 teams that advanced from the group stage. The participants consist of the winners and runners-up from each of the six groups (A–F), along with the four best third-placed teams.

=== Qualified teams ===
The following teams have qualified for the Round of 16:

Group winners and runners-up

- Group A: Jaksel and Jakarta United
- Group B: Persija Barat and Bina Mutiara
- Group C: PRO-Direct and PS Pemuda Jaya
- Group D: ASIOP and MC Utama
- Group E: Bintang Kota and Bina Taruna
- Group F: ABC Wirayudha and Villa 2000 B

Best third-placed teams

- Bintang Kranggan (Group A)
- Taruna Persada (Group C)
- Taruma (Group B)
- Urakan (Group D)

=== Bracket ===
The competition follows a single-elimination format.

Round of 16
2 April 2026 (Tugu)
Jaksel	2
Taruna Persada	0
2 April 2026 (PSF)
PRO-Direct	6
Taruma	3
2 April 2026 (Tugu)
Bina Mutiara	0 (4)
Villa 2000 B	0 (5)
2 April 2026 (Tugu)
Persija Barat	2
Urakan	0
2 April 2026 (PSF)
ASIOP	5
Bintang Kranggan	0
2 April 2026 (Tugu)
Bintang Kota	4
PS Pemuda Jaya	0
2 April 2026 (PSF)
ABC Wirayudha	0
MC Utama	1
2 April 2026 (PSF)
Jakarta United	2 (4)
Bina Taruna	2 (2)

Quarter-finals
4 April 2026 (Tugu)
Jaksel	1 (3)
PRO-Direct	1 (0)
4 April 2026 (Tugu)
Villa 2000 B	0 (3)
Persija Barat	0 (2)
4 April 2026 (Tugu)
ASIOP	4
Bintang Kota	0
4 April 2026 (Tugu)
MC Utama	1
Jakarta United	3

Semi-finals
6 April 2026 (PSF)
Jaksel	3
Villa 2000 B	0
6 April 2026 (PSF)
ASIOP	3
Jakarta United	1

Final
10 April 2026 (GBK Madya)
Jaksel	1
ASIOP	3
Third place
10 April 2026 (GBK Madya)
Villa 2000 B	0 (3)
Jakarta United	0 (1)

=== Knockout matches ===
==== Round of 16 ====
The Round of 16 matches were played on 2 April 2026 at two different venues: Tugu Stadium and Pancoran Soccer Field.

Round of 16 (2 April 2026)
2 April 2026
07:00 WIB

Jaksel	2–0	Taruna Persada
	Report

Tugu Stadium, North Jakarta
2 April 2026
09:00 WIB

Bina Mutiara	0–0	Villa 2000 B
	Report
Penalties
	4–5

Tugu Stadium, North Jakarta
2 April 2026
13:00 WIB

Persija Barat	2–0	Urakan
	Report

Tugu Stadium, North Jakarta
2 April 2026
15:00 WIB

Bintang Kota	4–0	PS Pemuda Jaya
	Report

Tugu Stadium, North Jakarta
2 April 2026
07:00 WIB

ABC Wirayudha	0–1	MC Utama
	Report

Pancoran Soccer Field (Field 1), South Jakarta
2 April 2026
09:00 WIB

Jakarta United	2–2	Bina Taruna
	Report
Penalties
	4–2

Pancoran Soccer Field (Field 1), South Jakarta
2 April 2026
11:00 WIB

PRO-Direct	6–3	Taruma
	Report

Pancoran Soccer Field (Field 1), South Jakarta
2 April 2026
13:00 WIB

ASIOP	5–0	Bintang Kranggan
	Report

Pancoran Soccer Field (Field 1), South Jakarta

==== Quarter-finals ====
The quarter-finals are scheduled for 4 April 2026 at the Tugu Stadium.

Quarter-finals (4 April 2026)
4 April 2026
07:00 WIB

Jaksel	1–1	PRO-Direct
	Report
Penalties
	3–0

Tugu Stadium, North Jakarta
4 April 2026
09:00 WIB

Villa 2000 B	0–0	Persija Barat
	Report
Penalties
	3–2

Tugu Stadium, North Jakarta
4 April 2026
13:00 WIB

ASIOP	4–0	Bintang Kota
	Report

Tugu Stadium, North Jakarta
4 April 2026
15:00 WIB

MC Utama	1–3	Jakarta United
	Report

Tugu Stadium, North Jakarta

==== Semi-finals ====
The semi-finals are scheduled for 6 April 2026 at the Pancoran Soccer Field.

Semi-finals (6 April 2026)
6 April 2026
09:00 WIB

Jaksel	3–0	Villa 2000 B
	Report

Pancoran Soccer Field (Field 1), South Jakarta
6 April 2026
13:00 WIB

ASIOP	3–1	Jakarta United
	Report

Pancoran Soccer Field (Field 1), South Jakarta

==== Third-place play-off ====
The third-place play-off match is scheduled for 10 April 2026 at the Gelora Bung Karno Madya Stadium.

3rd place (10 April 2026)
10 April 2026
08:30 WIB

Villa 2000 B	0–0	Jakarta United
	Report
Penalties
	3–1

Gelora Bung Karno Madya Stadium, South Jakarta

==== Final ====
The final match to determine the champion and national phase representative are scheduled for 10 April 2026 at the Gelora Bung Karno Madya Stadium.

Final (10 April 2026)
10 April 2026
14:00 WIB

Jaksel	1–3	ASIOP
	Report

Gelora Bung Karno Madya Stadium, South Jakarta

== See also ==
- 2025–26 Liga 4
- 2025–26 Liga 4 Banten
- 2025–26 Liga 4 West Java Series 1
- 2025–26 Liga 4 West Java Series 2
- 2025–26 Liga 4 Central Java
- 2025–26 Liga 4 Special Region of Yogyakarta
- 2025–26 Liga 4 East Java
