= 2024–25 Liga 4 Special Region of Jakarta =

Liga 4 Special Region of Jakarta
- Season: 2024–25
- Dates: 7–17 April 2025
- Champions: Batavia (1st title)
- National phase: Batavia; ASIOP; Persitara
- Matches: 38
- Goals: 190 (5 per match)
- Top goalscorer: Dindin Komarudin (7 goals)
- Biggest win: UMS 1905 1–16 Taruma (10 April 2025)
- Highest scoring: UMS 1905 1–16 Taruma (10 April 2025)
- Longest winless run: 3 games Bintang Kranggan; Mutiara Cempaka Utama; Persija Barat; UMS 1905
- Longest losing run: 3 games Bintang Kranggan; Mutiara Cempaka Utama; Persija Barat; UMS 1905

The 2024–25 Liga 4 Special Region of Jakarta was the inaugural season of Liga 4 Special Region of Jakarta after the change in the structure of Indonesian football competition and serves as a qualifying round for the national phase of the 2024–25 Liga 4. The competition is organised by the Special Region of Jakarta Provincial PSSI Association.

== Teams ==
A total of 22 teams are competing this season, two of which are based outside Jakarta but are members of the Jakarta Provincial PSSI Association.

=== Participating teams ===
No	Team	Location	2023–24 season
Jakarta teams
1	Jakarta City	North Jakarta	—
2	Persitara	North Jakarta	Runner-up
3	Persija Barat	West Jakarta	First round (2nd in Group D)
4	Trisakti	West Jakarta	First round (4th in Group D)
5	UMS 1905	West Jakarta	First round (3rd in Group B)
6	ASIOP	Central Jakarta	Champions
7	Bina Mutiara	Central Jakarta	—
8	Mutiara Cempaka Utama	Central Jakarta	—
9	Persija Muda	Central Jakarta	First round (2nd in Group C)
10	Putra Indonesia	Central Jakarta	—
11	Batavia	South Jakarta	Third place
12	Betawi	South Jakarta	—
13	Jaksel	South Jakarta	—
14	ABC Wirayudha	East Jakarta	—
15	Bina Taruna	East Jakarta	—
16	Bintang Kranggan	East Jakarta	—
17	Jakarta United	East Jakarta	—
18	Pemuda Jaya	East Jakarta	First round (3rd in Group C)
19	Taruna Persada	East Jakarta	First round (2nd in Group B)
20	Urakan	East Jakarta	First round (3rd in Group D)
Non-Jakarta teams
21	Bintang Kota	Tangerang	Fourth place
22	Taruma	Bekasi	First round (3rd in Group A)

=== Personnel and kits ===
Note: Flags indicate national team as has been defined under FIFA eligibility rules. Players and coaches may hold more than one non-FIFA nationality.

Team	Head coach	Captain	Kit manufacturer	Main kit sponsor	Other kit sponsor(s)
ABC Wirayudha			(Indonesia) 352 Sports	Bisabola.id	List: Front: Spar; Back: Bersama Indonesia Satu Foundation; Sleeves: None; Shorts: None
ASIOP			(Indonesia) Erspo	Bank Mandiri	List: Front: Sompo Insurance Indonesia, Transtama Logistics; Back: Ethiopian Airlines, Mitra Orphys; Sleeves: PT Inti Sukses Garmindo; Shorts: None
Batavia			(Indonesia) Curva Sport	PSF Group	List: Front: None; Back: None; Sleeves: None; Shorts: None
Betawi			(Indonesia) Made by club	Pos Indonesia	List: Front: Back: Sleeves: Shorts:
Bina Mutiara			(Indonesia) Wayank (H)	MS Glow For Men (H) / yourprettynails.id (A)	List: Front: Pegadaian, Garnier Men, Pengamat Sepakbola (H) / None (A); Back: yourprettynails.id (A); Sleeves: Vidio, Liga Top Skor (H) / None (A); Shorts: None (H & A)
Bina Taruna			(Indonesia) Wellsporte	Bina Taruna	List: Front: None; Back: None; Sleeves: None; Shorts: None
Bintang Kota			(Indonesia) Nathan Apparel	Nathan Group	List: Front: Centroflor; Back: None; Sleeves: None; Shorts: None
Bintang Kranggan		(Indonesia) M. Dhika	(Indonesia) Defender	Orphys	List: Front: None; Back: None; Sleeves: None; Shorts: None
Jakarta City	(Indonesia) A. Zainul Arifin		(Indonesia) QZF	SDS	List: Front: None; Back: None; Sleeves: None; Shorts: None
Jakarta United			(Indonesia) Cosmith	Primajasa	List: Front: BRI; Back: Cosmith; Sleeves: Shorts:
Jaksel		(Indonesia) Ridho Harisandhy		BMFC	List: Front: Back: Sleeves: Shorts:
Mutiara Cempaka Utama			(Indonesia) Vamos	MS Glow For Men	List: Front: Pegadaian, Pengamat Sepakbola; Back: None; Sleeves: Vidio; Shorts: None
Pemuda Jaya			(Indonesia) Fours	KJPP ANA	List: Front: Fantasistafootball.com; Back: Sleeves: Shorts:
Persija Barat			(Indonesia) Made by club	None	List: Front: None; Back: None; Sleeves: None; Shorts: None
Persija Muda	(Indonesia) Blitz Tarigan		(Indonesia) Ozverlig	None	List: Front: None; Back: None; Sleeves: None; Shorts: None
Persitara	(Indonesia) Nur Jati	(Indonesia) Muhammad Fahri	(Indonesia) Antri Apparel	Bebizie	List: Front: Jakarta Utara, Forum RT-RW DKI Jakarta, Pelindo; Back: None; Sleeves: None; Shorts: None
Putra Indonesia			(Indonesia) Made by club	None	List: Front: Back: Sleeves: Shorts:
Taruma			(Indonesia) Made by club	Taruma School	List: Front: BiBi Baby, Jago IT Ngaji; Back: KJPP ABF, BUMN, starting11; Sleeves: Shorts:
Taruna Persada	(Indonesia) Raden Muhammad Rizky		(Indonesia) Erukov	Agung Sport Centre	List: Front: Back: Sleeves: Shorts:
Trisakti					List: Front: Back: Sleeves: Shorts:
UMS 1905					List: Front: Back: Sleeves: Shorts:
Urakan	(Indonesia) Tedi Berlian		(Indonesia) Ereight	None	List: Front: None; Back: None; Sleeves: None; Shorts: None

== Schedule ==
The schedule of the competition is as follows.

Stage	Matchday	Date
Group stage	Matchday 1	7–8 April 2025
Group stage	Matchday 2	9–10 April 2025
Group stage	Matchday 3	11–12 April 2025
Knockout stage	Quarter-finals	14 April 2025
Knockout stage	Semi-finals	16 April 2025
Knockout stage	Third place play-off	17 April 2025
Knockout stage	Final	17 April 2025

== Group stage ==
The group stage draw took place on 16 March 2025 in Kemayoran, Central Jakarta, with 22 teams divided into six groups. The group stage will be played in a home tournament format of single round-robin matches.

The winners of each group along with two best runners-up will qualify for the knockout stage.

=== Group A ===
All matches will be held at Tugu Stadium in North Jakarta and ASIOP Stadium in Central Jakarta.

Pos	Team	Pld	W	D	L	GF	GA	GD	Pts	Qualification	PTR	BTG	BNA	MCU
1	Persitara (H)	3	3	0	0	14	0	+14	9	Qualification to the Knockout stage		3–0		6–0
2	Bintang Kota	3	2	0	1	6	4	+2	6				4–1	2–0
3	Bina Taruna	3	1	0	2	3	10	−7	3		0–5			
4	Mutiara Cempaka Utama	3	0	0	3	1	10	−9	0				1–2	

Source: Liga 4 Special Region of Jakarta
Rules for classification: 1) Points; 2) Head-to-head points; 3) Head-to-head goal difference; 4) Head-to-head goals scored; 5) Goal difference; 6) Goals scored; 7) Fair-play points; 8) Draw.
(H) Hosts

Group A Matches

Matchday 1 (7 April)
7 April 2025
07:00 UTC+7

Persitara	3–0	Bintang Kota
	Report

Tugu Stadium, North Jakarta
7 April 2025
09:00 UTC+7

Mutiara Cempaka Utama	1–2	Bina Taruna
	Report

Tugu Stadium, North Jakarta

Matchday 2 (9 April)
9 April 2025
13:00 UTC+7

Bintang Kota	2–0	Mutiara Cempaka Utama
	Report

Tugu Stadium, North Jakarta
9 April 2025
15:00 UTC+7

Bina Taruna	0–5	Persitara
	Report

Tugu Stadium, North Jakarta

Matchday 3 (11 April)
11 April 2025
07:00 UTC+7

Persitara	6–0	Mutiara Cempaka Utama
	Report

Tugu Stadium, North Jakarta
11 April 2025
07:00 UTC+7

Bintang Kota	4–1	Bina Taruna
	Report

ASIOP Stadium, Central Jakarta

=== Group B ===
All matches will be held at Tugu Stadium in North Jakarta and ASIOP Stadium in Central Jakarta.

Pos	Team	Pld	W	D	L	GF	GA	GD	Pts	Qualification	JUN	JCI	TRI	PJB
1	Jakarta United	3	2	1	0	19	2	+17	7	Qualification to the Knockout stage		1–1		
2	Jakarta City	3	2	1	0	7	1	+6	7	Qualification to the Knockout stage			4–0	2–0
3	Trisakti	3	1	0	2	11	11	0	3		1–6			
4	Persija Barat	3	0	0	3	1	24	−23	0		0–12		1–10	

Source: Liga 4 Special Region of Jakarta
Rules for classification: 1) Points; 2) Head-to-head points; 3) Head-to-head goal difference; 4) Head-to-head goals scored; 5) Goal difference; 6) Goals scored; 7) Fair-play points; 8) Draw.

Group B Matches

Matchday 1 (7 April)
7 April 2025
13:00 UTC+7

Jakarta City	2–0	Persija Barat
	Report

Tugu Stadium, North Jakarta
7 April 2025
15:00 UTC+7

Trisakti	1–6	Jakarta United
	Report

Tugu Stadium, North Jakarta

Matchday 2 (9 April)
9 April 2025
07:00 UTC+7

Persija Barat	1–10	Trisakti
	Report

Tugu Stadium, North Jakarta
9 April 2025
09:00 UTC+7

Jakarta United	1–1	Jakarta City
	Report

Tugu Stadium, North Jakarta

Matchday 3 (11 April)
11 April 2025
09:00 UTC+7

Jakarta City	4–0	Trisakti
	Report

Tugu Stadium, North Jakarta
11 April 2025
09:00 UTC+7

Persija Barat	0–12	Jakarta United
	Report

ASIOP Stadium, Central Jakarta

=== Group C ===
All matches will be held at Tugu Stadium in North Jakarta and ASIOP Stadium in Central Jakarta.

Pos	Team	Pld	W	D	L	GF	GA	GD	Pts	Qualification	BTV	TRM	ABC	UMS
1	Batavia	3	3	0	0	25	0	+25	9	Qualification to the Knockout stage		9–0		8–0
2	Taruma	3	2	0	1	18	11	+7	6				2–1	
3	ABC Wirayudha	3	1	0	2	4	10	−6	3		0–8			
4	UMS 1905	3	0	0	3	1	27	−26	0			1–16	0–3 (Note: The match was awarded as a 3–0 victory to ABC Wirayudha, after UMS 1905 did not send their team for the match.)	

Source: Liga 4 Special Region of Jakarta
Rules for classification: 1) Points; 2) Head-to-head points; 3) Head-to-head goal difference; 4) Head-to-head goals scored; 5) Goal difference; 6) Goals scored; 7) Fair-play points; 8) Draw.
Notes:

Group C Matches

Matchday 1 (8 April)
8 April 2025
07:00 UTC+7

Batavia	8–0	UMS 1905
	Report

Tugu Stadium, North Jakarta
8 April 2025
09:00 UTC+7

Taruma	2–1	ABC Wirayudha
	Report

Tugu Stadium, North Jakarta

Matchday 2 (10 April)
10 April 2025
13:00 UTC+7

UMS 1905	1–16	Taruma
	Report

Tugu Stadium, North Jakarta
10 April 2025
15:00 UTC+7

ABC Wirayudha	0–8	Batavia
	Report

Tugu Stadium, North Jakarta

Matchday 3 (12 April)
12 April 2025
07:00 UTC+7

Batavia	9–0	Taruma
	Report

Tugu Stadium, North Jakarta
12 April 2025
07:00 UTC+7

UMS 1905	0–3 Awarded (Note: The match was awarded as a 3–0 victory to ABC Wirayudha, after UMS 1905 did not send their team for the match.)	ABC Wirayudha
	Report

ASIOP Stadium, Central Jakarta

=== Group D ===
All matches will be held at Tugu Stadium in North Jakarta and ASIOP Stadium in Central Jakarta.

Pos	Team	Pld	W	D	L	GF	GA	GD	Pts	Qualification	URK	JSL	PJM	BTG
1	Urakan	3	2	1	0	10	2	+8	7	Qualification to the Knockout stage		1–1		
2	Jaksel	3	2	1	0	6	1	+5	7	Qualification to the Knockout stage			2–0	3–0
3	Persija Muda	3	1	0	2	6	4	+2	3		1–2			5–0
4	Bintang Kranggan	3	0	0	3	0	15	−15	0		0–7			

Source: Liga 4 Special Region of Jakarta
Rules for classification: 1) Points; 2) Head-to-head points; 3) Head-to-head goal difference; 4) Head-to-head goals scored; 5) Goal difference; 6) Goals scored; 7) Fair-play points; 8) Draw.

Group D Matches

Matchday 1 (8 April)
8 April 2025
13:00 UTC+7

Jaksel	2–0	Persija Muda
	Report

Tugu Stadium, North Jakarta
8 April 2025
15:00 UTC+7

Bintang Kranggan	0–7	Urakan
	Report

Tugu Stadium, North Jakarta

Matchday 2 (10 April)
10 April 2025
07:00 UTC+7

Persija Muda	5–0	Bintang Kranggan
	Report

Tugu Stadium, North Jakarta
10 April 2025
09:00 UTC+7

Urakan	1–1	Jaksel
	Report

Tugu Stadium, North Jakarta

Matchday 3 (12 April)
12 April 2025
09:00 UTC+7

Jaksel	3–0	Bintang Kranggan
	Report

Tugu Stadium, North Jakarta
12 April 2025
09:00 UTC+7

Persija Muda	1–2	Urakan
	Report

ASIOP Stadium, Central Jakarta

=== Group E ===
All matches will be held at ASIOP Stadium in Central Jakarta.

Pos	Team	Pld	W	D	L	GF	GA	GD	Pts	Qualification	ASI	BNA	PJY
1	ASIOP (H)	2	2	0	0	10	1	+9	6	Qualification to the Knockout stage		3–1	
2	Bina Mutiara	2	1	0	1	7	6	+1	3				6–3
3	Pemuda Jaya	2	0	0	2	3	13	−10	0		0–7		

Source: Liga 4 Special Region of Jakarta
Rules for classification: 1) Points; 2) Head-to-head points; 3) Head-to-head goal difference; 4) Head-to-head goals scored; 5) Goal difference; 6) Goals scored; 7) Fair-play points; 8) Draw.
(H) Hosts

Group E Matches

Matchday 1 (7 April)
7 April 2025
07:00 UTC+7

ASIOP	3–1	Bina Mutiara
	Report

ASIOP Stadium, Central Jakarta

Matchday 2 (9 April)
9 April 2025
09:00 UTC+7

Bina Mutiara	6–3	Pemuda Jaya
	Report

ASIOP Stadium, Central Jakarta

Matchday 3 (11 April)
11 April 2025
13:00 UTC+7

Pemuda Jaya	0–7	ASIOP
	Report

ASIOP Stadium, Central Jakarta

=== Group F ===
All matches will be held at ASIOP Stadium in Central Jakarta and Tugu Stadium in North Jakarta.

Pos	Team	Pld	W	D	L	GF	GA	GD	Pts	Qualification	BTW	TRN	PTR
1	Betawi	2	1	1	0	2	1	+1	4	Qualification to the Knockout stage			1–1
2	Taruna Persada	2	1	0	1	3	1	+2	3		0–1		
3	Putra Indonesia	2	0	1	1	1	4	−3	1			0–3	

Source: Liga 4 Special Region of Jakarta
Rules for classification: 1) Points; 2) Head-to-head points; 3) Head-to-head goal difference; 4) Head-to-head goals scored; 5) Goal difference; 6) Goals scored; 7) Fair-play points; 8) Draw.

Group F Matches

Matchday 1 (7 April)
7 April 2025
09:00 UTC+7

Betawi	1–1	Putra Indonesia
	Report

ASIOP Stadium, Central Jakarta

Matchday 2 (9 April)
9 April 2025
07:00 UTC+7

Putra Indonesia	0–3	Taruna Persada
	Report

ASIOP Stadium, Central Jakarta

Matchday 3 (11 April)
11 April 2025
13:00 UTC+7

Taruna Persada	0–1	Betawi
	Report

Tugu Stadium, North Jakarta

=== Ranking of runners-up teams ===
Due to groups having a different number of teams, the results against the fourth-placed teams in four-team groups were not considered for this ranking.

Pos	Grp	Team	Pld	W	D	L	GF	GA	GD	Pts	Qualification
1	B	Jakarta City	2	1	1	0	5	1	+4	4	Advance to the Knockout stage
2	D	Jaksel	2	1	1	0	3	1	+2	4	Advance to the Knockout stage
3	F	Taruna Persada	2	1	0	1	3	1	+2	3	
4	E	Bina Mutiara	2	1	0	1	7	6	+1	3	
5	A	Bintang Kota	2	1	0	1	4	4	0	3	
6	C	Taruma	2	1	0	1	2	10	−8	3	

Source: Liga 4 Special Region of Jakarta
Rules for classification: 1) Points; 2) Goal difference; 3) Goals scored; 4) Fair-play points; 5) Draw

== Knockout stage ==
The knockout stage will be played as a single match. If tied after regulation time, extra time and, if necessary, a penalty shoot-out will be used to decide the winning team. The top three teams will qualify for the national phase.

=== Bracket ===
Quarter-finals
14 April — North Jakarta
A1	Persitara	2
B2	Jakarta City	0
14 April — Central Jakarta
C1	Batavia	7
D1	Urakan	0
14 April — North Jakarta
B1	Jakarta United	2
D2	Jaksel	1
14 April — Central Jakarta
E1	ASIOP	8
F1	Betawi	0

Semi-finals
16 April — North Jakarta
Persitara	0 (3)
Batavia (p)	0 (5)
16 April — Central Jakarta
Jakarta United	0
ASIOP	3

Final
17 April — North Jakarta
Batavia	2
ASIOP	0
Third place play-off
17 April — North Jakarta
Persitara	6
Jakarta United	1

=== Quarter-finals ===
14 April 2025
08:00 UTC+7

Persitara	2–0	Jakarta City
	Report

Tugu Stadium, North Jakarta

14 April 2025
08:00 UTC+7

Batavia	7–0	Urakan
	Report

ASIOP Stadium, Central Jakarta

14 April 2025
13:00 UTC+7

Jakarta United	2–1	Jaksel
	Report

Tugu Stadium, North Jakarta

14 April 2025
13:00 UTC+7

ASIOP	8–0	Betawi
	Report

ASIOP Stadium, Central Jakarta

=== Semi-finals ===
16 April 2025
13:00 UTC+7

Persitara	0–0 (a.e.t.)	Batavia
	Report
Penalties
	3–5

Tugu Stadium, North Jakarta

16 April 2025
13:00 UTC+7

Jakarta United	0–3	ASIOP
	Report

ASIOP Stadium, Central Jakarta

=== Third place play-off ===
The winner of this match will be placed in Group E.

17 April 2025
08:00 UTC+7

Persitara	6–1	Jakarta United
	Report

Tugu Stadium, North Jakarta

=== Final ===
The winner will be placed in Group J and the runner-up will be placed in Group K.

17 April 2025
14:30 UTC+7

Batavia	2–0	ASIOP
	Report

Tugu Stadium, North Jakarta

== See also ==
- 2024–25 Liga 4
