= 2023–24 Liga 3 Jakarta =

Tournament details
- Country: Indonesia
- Venue: 1
- Dates: 26 February 2024 – 6 March 2024
- Teams: 13

Final positions
- Champions: ASIOP (1st title)
- Runners-up: Persitara
- Third place: Batavia
- Qualified for: 2023–24 Liga 3 National Phase

Tournament statistics
- Matches played: 19
- Goals scored: 101 (5.32 per match)
- All statistics correct as of 6 March 2024.

The 2023–24 Liga 3 Jakarta (also known as 2023–24 Liga 3 Jakarta Governor's Cup for sponsorship reason) is the fourth edition of Liga 3 Jakarta organized by Asprov PSSI Jakarta.

Batavia are the defending champion after winning it in the 2021.

== Teams ==
2023–24 Liga 3 Jakarta was attended by 13 teams.

No	Team	Location
Special Capital Region of Jakarta
1	Persija Muda	Central Jakarta
2	Persitara	North Jakarta
3	Urakan	East Jakarta
4	Pemuda Jaya	East Jakarta
5	Taruna Persada	East Jakarta
6	Persija Barat	West Jakarta
7	UMS 1905	West Jakarta
8	Trisakti	West Jakarta
9	Taruma	West Jakarta
10	Batavia	South Jakarta
11	ASIOP	South Jakarta
12	PRO-Direct	South Jakarta
Banten
13	Bintang Kota	Tangerang

== Venues ==
- Viyata Jales Yudha Kolat Koarmada I Military Stadium, North Jakarta

== First round ==
=== Group A ===
Pos	Team	Pld	W	D	L	GF	GA	GD	Pts	Qualification	PTR	PRO	TAR
1	Persitara	2	2	0	0	6	1	+5	6	Advance to Knockout round	—	4–0	2–1
2	PRO-Direct	2	1	0	1	4	6	−2	3			—	4–2
3	Taruma	2	0	0	2	3	6	−3	0				—

Source: Liga 3 DKI Jakarta

=== Group B ===
Pos	Team	Pld	W	D	L	GF	GA	GD	Pts	Qualification	BIN	TAR	UMS
1	Bintang Kota	2	2	0	0	9	2	+7	6	Advance to Knockout round	—	4–1	5–1
2	Taruna Persada	2	0	1	1	3	6	−3	1			—	
3	UMS 1905	2	0	1	1	3	7	−4	1			2–2	—

Source: Liga 3 DKI Jakarta

=== Group C ===
Pos	Team	Pld	W	D	L	GF	GA	GD	Pts	Qualification	ASP	PSJ	PJY
1	ASIOP	2	2	0	0	10	0	+10	6	Advance to Knockout round	—	5–0	
2	Persija Muda	2	1	0	1	5	6	−1	3			—	
3	PS Pemuda Jaya	2	0	0	2	1	10	−9	0		0–5	1–5	—

Source: Liga 3 DKI Jakarta

=== Group D ===
Pos	Team	Pld	W	D	L	GF	GA	GD	Pts	Qualification	BTV	PJB	UFC	TRI
1	Batavia	3	2	1	0	13	2	+11	7	Advance to Knockout round	—		3–0	8–0
2	Persija Barat	3	2	1	0	10	6	+4	7		2–2	—	4–2	
3	Urakan	3	1	0	2	8	10	−2	3				—	
4	Trisakti	3	0	0	3	5	18	−13	0			2–4	3–6	—

Source: Liga 3 DKI Jakarta

== Knockout round ==
=== Bracket ===
Semi-finals
5 March 2024 – North Jakarta
D1	Persitara	4
E2	Bintang Kota	2
5 March 2024 – North Jakarta
E1	ASIOP	3
D2	Batavia	1

Final
6 March 2024 – North Jakarta
Persitara	1
ASIOP	2
Third place play-off
6 March 2024 – North Jakarta
Bintang Kota	1
Batavia	7

=== Semi-finals ===
5 March 2024
08:00 WIB

Persitara	4–2	Bintang Kota
	Report

JIS Training Ground, North Jakarta

5 March 2024
14:00 WIB

ASIOP	3–1	Batavia
	Report

JIS Training Ground, North Jakarta

=== Third place play-off ===
6 March 2024
08:00 WIB

Bintang Kota	1–7	Batavia
	Report

JIS Training Ground, North Jakarta

=== Final ===
6 March 2024
14:00 WIB

Persitara	1–2	ASIOP
	Report

JIS Training Ground, North Jakarta

== Qualification to the national phase ==
Team	Method of qualification	Date of qualification	Qualified to
Persitara	Finalist of 2023–24 Liga 3 Jakarta	5 March 2024	2023–24 Liga 3 National Phase
ASIOP	Finalist of 2023–24 Liga 3 Jakarta	5 March 2024	2023–24 Liga 3 National Phase

== See also ==
- 2023–24 Liga 3 National phase
- 2023 Liga 3 West Java Series 1
- 2023 Liga 3 East Java
- 2023 Liga 3 Central Java
- 2023 Liga 3 Special Region of Yogyakarta
- 2023 Liga 3 Banten
- 2023 Liga 3 West Java Series 2
