= 2006 Liga Indonesia Premier Division final =

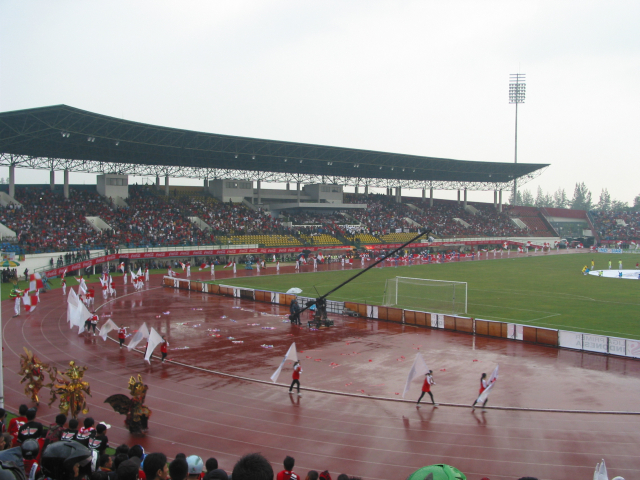
- The final was played at Manahan Stadium.
- Event: 2006 Liga Indonesia Premier Division
| Persik | PSIS |
| 1 | 0 |
- After extra time
- Date: 30 July 2006
- Venue: Manahan Stadium, Solo
- Referee: Jimmy Napitupulu
- Attendance: 25,000
- Weather: Fine

The 2006 Liga Indonesia Premier Division final was a football match which was played on 30 July 2006 at Manahan Stadium in Solo. It was contested by Persik and PSIS to determine the winner of the 2006 Liga Indonesia Premier Division. Persik won the match 1–0 after 120 minutes with Cristian Gonzáles scoring the winning goal for their second Premier Division title.

== Road to the final ==
| Persik | | Round | PSIS | |
|---|---|---|---|---|
| Main article: 2006 Liga Indonesia Premier Division first stage: East Region: Pos / Team / Pld / W / D / L / GF / GA / GD / Pts; 1 / Persmin / 26 / 16 / 2 / 8 / 37 / 26 / +11 / 50; 2 / Persik / 26 / 14 / 5 / 7 / 53 / 24 / +29 / 47; 3 / PSM / 26 / 12 / 6 / 8 / 44 / 32 / +12 / 42; 4 / Persiba / 26 / 12 / 5 / 9 / 35 / 28 / +7 / 41; 5 / Persiwa / 26 / 11 / 7 / 8 / 34 / 34 / 0 / 40; 6 / Persela / 26 / 10 / 8 / 8 / 23 / 23 / 0 / 38; 7 / Persema / 26 / 11 / 3 / 12 / 39 / 37 / +2 / 36; 8 / Persipura / 26 / 9 / 8 / 9 / 27 / 23 / +4 / 35; 9 / Persiter / 26 / 10 / 5 / 11 / 33 / 34 / −1 / 35; 10 / Bontang PKT / 26 / 10 / 5 / 11 / 33 / 42 / −9 / 35; 11 / Persibom / 26 / 9 / 6 / 11 / 35 / 46 / −11 / 33; 12 / Deltras Sidoarjo / 26 / 9 / 5 / 12 / 35 / 32 / +3 / 32; 13 / PSS / 26 / 6 / 5 / 15 / 18 / 40 / −22 / 23; 14 / Persegi / 26 / 5 / 6 / 15 / 24 / 49 / −25 / 21; Source: RSSSF | | First stage | Main article: 2006 Liga Indonesia Premier Division first stage: West Region: Pos / Team / Pld / W / D / L / GF / GA / GD / Pts; 1 / Arema / 26 / 13 / 8 / 5 / 39 / 17 / +22 / 47; 2 / Persija / 26 / 13 / 8 / 5 / 26 / 16 / +10 / 47; 3 / PSIS / 26 / 13 / 5 / 8 / 33 / 27 / +6 / 44; 4 / Persekabpas / 26 / 12 / 6 / 8 / 35 / 27 / +8 / 42; 5 / PSMS / 26 / 12 / 3 / 11 / 31 / 27 / +4 / 39; 6 / Sriwijaya / 26 / 8 / 10 / 8 / 29 / 24 / +5 / 34; 7 / Persikota / 26 / 9 / 7 / 10 / 34 / 37 / −3 / 34; 8 / Persitara / 26 / 10 / 4 / 12 / 29 / 34 / −5 / 34; 9 / Persijap / 26 / 8 / 9 / 9 / 25 / 27 / −2 / 33; 10 / Persita / 26 / 8 / 8 / 10 / 25 / 30 / −5 / 32; 11 / Semen Padang / 26 / 8 / 6 / 12 / 20 / 24 / −4 / 30; 12 / Persib / 26 / 7 / 8 / 11 / 23 / 30 / −7 / 29; 13 / PSDS / 26 / 8 / 5 / 13 / 32 / 41 / −9 / 29; 14 / PSIM / 26 / 7 / 5 / 14 / 23 / 43 / −20 / 26; Source: RSSSF | |
| Main article: 2006 Liga Indonesia Premier Division second stage: Group A: Pos / Team / Pld / W / D / L / GF / GA / GD / Pts; 1 / Persik / 3 / 2 / 1 / 0 / 4 / 1 / +3 / 7; 2 / PSIS / 3 / 2 / 0 / 1 / 3 / 3 / 0 / 6; 3 / Arema / 3 / 1 / 0 / 2 / 3 / 2 / +1 / 3; 4 / Persiba / 3 / 0 / 1 / 2 / 0 / 4 / −4 / 1; Source: RSSSF | | Second stage | Main article: 2006 Liga Indonesia Premier Division second stage: Group A: Pos / Team / Pld / W / D / L / GF / GA / GD / Pts; 1 / Persik / 3 / 2 / 1 / 0 / 4 / 1 / +3 / 7; 2 / PSIS Semarang / 3 / 2 / 0 / 1 / 3 / 3 / 0 / 6; 3 / Arema / 3 / 1 / 0 / 2 / 3 / 2 / +1 / 3; 4 / Persiba / 3 / 0 / 1 / 2 / 0 / 4 / −4 / 1; Source: RSSSF | |
| Opponent | Result | Knockout stage | Opponent | Result |
| Persmin | 3–1 | Semifinals | Persekabpas | 1–0 |

== Match details ==
30 July 2006

| Persik | 1–0 (a.e.t.) | PSIS |
|---|---|---|
| Gonzáles 110' |

Manahan Stadium, Solo
Attendance: 25,000
Referee: Jimmy Napitupulu

Persik
PSIS

Persik:
| GK | 27 | (Indonesia) Wahyudi |
| CB | 6 | (Indonesia) Suroso |
| CB | 4 | (Indonesia) Aris Indarto (c) |
| CB | 14 | (Chile) Leonardo Gutierrez |
| CM | 12 | (Indonesia) Harianto |
| CM | 88 | (Brazil) Danilo Fernando | (yellow card) 54' |
| CM | 8 | (Indonesia) Jefry Dwi Hadi | (yellow card) 17' | (substituted off) 55' |
| CM | 23 | (Nigeria) Ebi Sukore | | (substituted off) 77' |
| CM | 25 | (Indonesia) Khusnul Yuli |
| CF | 10 | (Uruguay) Cristian Gonzáles | (red card) 110' |
| CF | 13 | (Indonesia) Budi Sudarsono | | (substituted off) 77' |
Substitutes:
| MF | 19 | (Indonesia) Suswanto | | (substituted on) 55' |
| MF | 7 | (Indonesia) Bertha Yuwana | | (substituted on) 116' |
Head Coach:
(Indonesia) Daniel Roekito

PSIS:
| GK | 12 | (Indonesia) I Komang Putra |
| CB | 5 | (Indonesia) Maman Abdurrahman | (yellow card) 62' |
| CB | 25 | (Liberia) Fofee Kamara |
| CB | 27 | (Cameroon) Zoubairou Garba | | (substituted off) 113' |
| RM | 23 | (Indonesia) Muhammad Ridwan |
| CM | 10 | (Argentina) Gustavo Ortiz |
| CM | 24 | (Indonesia) Suwita Pata |
| CM | 9 | (Indonesia) Indriyanto Nugroho | | (substituted off) 54' |
| LM | 17 | (Indonesia) Harry Salisbury |
| CF | 20 | (Argentina) Emanuel De Porras |
| CF | 7 | (Indonesia) Imral Usman | | (substituted off) 64' |
Substitutes:
| DF | 16 | (Indonesia) Deni Rumba | | (substituted on) 113' |
| MF | 15 | (Paraguay) Miguel Angel Dominguez | | (substituted on) 54' |
| MF | 21 | (Indonesia) Khusnul Yakin | (yellow card) 79' | (substituted on) 64' |
Head Coach:
(Indonesia) Bonggo Pribadi
