= 2018 Liga 3 Jakarta =

Liga 3 Jakarta
- Season: 2018
- Champions: Jakarta Timur

The 2018 Liga 3 Jakarta is a qualifying round for the national round of 2018 Liga 3. Villa 2000 21 FC, the winner of the 2017 Liga 3 Jakarta are the defending champions. The competition will begin on July 20, 2018.

== Group stage ==
The 21 probable teams to compete are mentioned below. This stage scheduled starts on 21 July 2018.

=== Group A ===
Pos	Team	Pld	W	D	L	GF	GA	GD	Pts	Qualification
1	Batavia F.C. (A)	4	3	1	0	16	1	+15	10	Advance to next round
2	PSJS South Jakarta (A)	4	2	1	1	5	2	+3	7	Advance to next round
3	Betawi F.C.	4	1	3	0	4	2	+2	6	
4	Villa 2000 21 F.C.	4	1	1	2	5	4	+1	4	
5	Laskar Muda F.C.	4	0	0	4	0	21	−21	0	

Updated to match(es) played on 20 July 2018. Source:
(A) Advance to a further round

=== Group B ===
Pos	Team	Pld	W	D	L	GF	GA	GD	Pts	Qualification
1	Trisakti F.C. (A)	4	3	1	0	12	3	+9	10	Advance to next round
2	Urakan F.C. (A)	4	3	1	0	6	1	+5	10	Advance to next round
3	Bintang Kranggan	4	2	0	2	4	6	−2	6	
4	Pemuda Jaya	4	1	0	3	5	6	−1	3	
5	Kompak F.C.	4	0	0	4	2	13	−11	0	

Updated to match(es) played on 20 July 2018. Source:
(A) Advance to a further round

=== Group C ===
Pos	Team	Pld	W	D	L	GF	GA	GD	Pts	Qualification
1	PRO Direct F.C. (A)	4	4	0	0	13	3	+10	12	Advance to next round
2	Bintang Kota F.C. (A)	4	3	0	1	5	3	+2	9	Advance to next round
3	Taruna Persada	4	1	0	3	4	5	−1	3	
4	PS Jakarta Barat	4	1	0	3	3	6	−3	3	
5	Bina Mutiara F.C.	4	1	0	3	5	13	−8	3	

Updated to match(es) played on 20 July 2018. Source:
(A) Advance to a further round

=== Group D ===
Pos	Team	Pld	W	D	L	GF	GA	GD	Pts	Qualification
1	Jakarta Timur F.C. (A)	5	5	0	0	11	2	+9	15	Advance to next round
2	Persitara North Jakarta (A)	5	3	1	1	15	8	+7	10	Advance to next round
3	MC Utama	5	2	2	1	7	6	+1	8	
4	Putra Citra Muda	5	1	2	2	7	9	−2	5	
5	Persija Muda	5	1	1	3	4	9	−5	4	
6	ABC Wirayudha	5	0	0	5	4	14	−10	0	

Updated to match(es) played on 20 July 2018. Source:
(A) Advance to a further round

== Knockout stage ==
Top 8
18 August
Batavia F.C.	3
Urakan F.C.	0
18 August
PRO:Direct F.C.	0 (8)
Persitara North Jakarta	0 (7)
19 August
Trisakti F.C.	0
PSJS South Jakarta	2
19 August
Jakarta Timur F.C.	3
Bintang Kota F.C.	0

Semi-finals
23 August
Batavia F.C. (DQ)	0
PRO:Direct F.C.	3
23 August
PSJS South Jakarta	1
Jakarta Timur F.C.	2

Final
27 August
PRO:Direct F.C.	2 (2)
Jakarta Timur F.C.	2 (4)
Third place play-off
27 August
Batavia F.C. (DQ)	0
PSJS South Jakarta	3
