= 2021 Liga 3 Jakarta =

Tournament details
- Dates: 24 November–22 December 2021
- Teams: 23

Final positions
- Champions: Batavia (1st title)
- Runners-up: ASIOP
- Third place: UMS 1905
- Fourth place: Persija Barat

The 2021 Liga 3 Jakarta (also known as Liga 3 MS Glow For Men PSSI DKI Jakarta for sponsorship reason) will be the sixth season of Liga 3 Jakarta as a qualifying round for the national round of the 2021–22 Liga 3.

Jakarta United were the defending champion.

== Teams ==
There are 23 teams participated in the league this season.

Team	Location
ABC Wirayudha	East Jakarta
ASIOP	South Jakarta
Batavia	South Jakarta
Betawi	South Jakarta
Bina Mutiara	South Jakarta
Bina Taruna	East Jakarta
Bintang Kota	Tangerang, Banten
Bintang Kranggan	East Jakarta
Laskar Muda	West Jakarta
MC Utama	Central Jakarta
Persija Barat	West Jakarta
Persija Muda	Central Jakarta
Persitara	North Jakarta
PSJS	South Jakarta
PS Pemuda Jaya	East Jakarta
Putra Indonesia	Central Jakarta
Taruna Persada	East Jakarta
Trisakti	West Jakarta
UMS 1905	West Jakarta
Urakan	East Jakarta
Jakarta City	North Jakarta
Jakarta United	East Jakarta
Villa 2000 B	South Tangerang, Banten

== Venues ==
- Group A: Cendrawasih Stadium, West Jakarta
- Group B: Soemantri Brodjonegoro Stadium, South Jakarta
- Group C: Ciracas Stadium, East Jakarta
- Group D: Tugu Stadium, North Jakarta

== Group stage ==
=== Group A ===
Pos	Team	Pld	W	D	L	GF	GA	GD	Pts	Qualification
1	Persija Barat (H)	4	3	1	0	10	2	+8	10	Qualified
2	UMS 1905	4	3	1	0	10	3	+7	10	Qualified
3	Bintang Kota	4	2	0	2	6	2	+4	6	
4	PS Pemuda Jaya	4	1	0	3	7	12	−5	3	
5	Putra Indonesia	4	0	0	4	2	21	−19	0	

Source: Liga 3 DKI Jakarta
(H) Hosts

=== Group B ===
Pos	Team	Pld	W	D	L	GF	GA	GD	Pts	Qualification
1	Batavia	5	4	1	0	22	1	+21	13	Qualified
2	ASIOP	5	4	1	0	17	1	+16	13	Qualified
3	Taruna Persada	5	3	0	2	14	4	+10	9	
4	Urakan	5	1	1	3	9	14	−5	4	
5	PSJS (H)	5	0	2	3	3	14	−11	2	
6	Betawi	5	0	1	4	2	33	−31	1	

Source: Liga 3 DKI Jakarta
(H) Hosts

=== Group C ===
Pos	Team	Pld	W	D	L	GF	GA	GD	Pts	Qualification
1	Persija Muda	5	4	1	0	15	6	+9	13	Qualified
2	Laskar Muda	5	3	1	1	9	7	+2	10	Qualified
3	Trisakti	5	2	1	2	14	8	+6	7	
4	Bina Mutiara	5	1	2	2	10	11	−1	5	
5	Bintang Kranggan (H)	5	0	3	2	4	13	−9	3	
6	MC Utama	5	0	2	3	4	11	−7	2	

Source: Liga 3 DKI Jakarta
(H) Hosts

=== Group D ===
Pos	Team	Pld	W	D	L	GF	GA	GD	Pts	Qualification
1	Jakarta United	5	5	0	0	13	1	+12	15	Qualified
2	Persitara (H)	5	3	1	1	9	3	+6	10	Qualified
3	Jakarta City	5	2	2	1	8	5	+3	8	
4	Villa 2000 B	5	1	2	2	4	5	−1	5	
5	Bina Taruna	5	1	1	3	3	12	−9	4	
6	ABC Wirayudha	5	0	0	5	3	14	−11	0	

Source: Liga 3 DKI Jakarta
(H) Hosts

== Knockout stage ==
Quarterfinals
Persija Barat	1
Laskar Muda	0
Jakarta United	0
ASIOP	1
Batavia	2
Persitara	0
Persija Muda	2
UMS 1905	3

Semifinals
Persija Barat	0
ASIOP	5
Batavia	3
UMS 1905	1

Finals
ASIOP	0
Batavia (a.e.t)	1
Third place
UMS 1905	4
Persija Barat	0

=== Quarterfinals ===
December 15, 2021
14.30 UTC+7

Persija Barat	1–0	Laskar Muda
	Report

Cendrawasih Stadium, West Jakarta
December 15, 2021
14.30 UTC+7

Jakarta United	0–1	ASIOP
	Report

Tugu Stadium, North Jakarta
December 15, 2021
14.30 UTC+7

Batavia	2–0	Persitara
	Report

Soemantri Brodjonegoro Stadium, South Jakarta
December 15, 2021
14.30 UTC+7

Persija Muda	2–3	UMS 1905
	Report

Ciracas Stadium, East Jakarta

=== Semifinals ===
December 18, 2021
14.30 UTC+7

Persija Barat	0–5	ASIOP
	Report

Soemantri Brodjonegoro Stadium, South Jakarta
December 18, 2021
14.30 UTC+7

Batavia	3–1	UMS 1905
	Report

Cendrawasih Stadium, West Jakarta

=== Third place ===
December 21, 2021
14.30 UTC+7

UMS 1905	4–0	Persija Barat
	Report

Soemantri Brodjonegoro Stadium, South Jakarta

=== Finals ===
December 22, 2021
14.30 UTC+7

ASIOP	0-1 (a.e.t)	Batavia

TBD
