= Suwita Pata =

Indonesian footballer (born 1974)

Personal information
- Date of birth: 25 March 1974 (age 52)
- Place of birth: Bandung, Indonesia
- Height: 1.73 m (5 ft 8 in)
- Positions: Defender; midfielder

Youth career
- 1990–1992: Persikab Bandung

Senior career*
Years	Team	Apps	(Gls)
1992–2001	Persikab Bandung		
2001–2003	PSS Sleman		
2004–2005	Persib Bandung	20	(0)
2006	PSIS Semarang		
2007–2009	Persib Bandung		
2010	Persitara North Jakarta		
2011	PSIS Semarang		
2013	Persikota Tangerang		
2016–2017	Persikotas Tasikmalaya		

International career
2008	Indonesia	1	(0)
- * Club domestic league appearances and goals

Suwita Pata (born 25 March 1974) is an Indonesian former footballer who played as a defender or midfielder.

== Early life ==
Pata was born in 1974 in Indonesia. He grew up in Bandung, Indonesia.

== Career ==
Pata started his career with Indonesian side Persikab Bandung. In 2001, he signed for Indonesian side PSS Sleman. In 2004, he signed for Indonesian side Persib Bandung. In 2006, he signed for Indonesian side PSIS Semarang. In 2007, he signed for Indonesian side Persib Bandung. In 2010, he signed for Indonesian side Persitara North Jakarta. In 2011, he returned to Indonesian side PSIS Semarang. In 2013, he signed for Indonesian side Persikota Tangerang. In 2016, he signed for Indonesian side Persikotas Tasikmalaya.

== Style of play ==
Pata mainly operated as a defender or midfielder. He was known for his speed.

== Personal life ==
After retiring from professional football, Pata worked as a manager. He has been nicknamed "Wita".

== Honours ==
PSIS Semarang

- Liga Indonesia Premier Division runner up: 2006
