= Kamal Muara Stadium =

Stadium in Jakarta, Indonesia

Coordinates: 6°05′46″S 106°43′20″E

- Interactive map of Kamal Muara Stadium
- Full name: Kamal Muara Stadium
- Location: Penjaringan, North Jakarta, Special Capital Region of Jakarta, Indonesia
- Owner: Government of Special Capital Region of Jakarta
- Operator: Government of Special Capital Region of Jakarta
- Capacity: 10,000 (Football)
- Surface: Grass

Tenants
- Persitara North Jakarta; Jakarta City

Kamal Muara Stadium is a multi-use stadium in Jakarta, Indonesia. It is currently used mostly for football. The stadium has a capacity of 10,000 spectators.
