= Damas Damar Jati =

Indonesian footballer

Damas Damar
Personal information
- Full name: Damas Damar Jati
- Date of birth: 18 October 2000 (age 26)
- Place of birth: Semarang, Indonesia
- Height: 1.78 m (5 ft 10 in)
- Position: Defensive midfielder

Youth career
- 2016–2017: Hati Beriman Salatiga
- 2018: PSIS U19
- 2019: PON Jateng
- 2019: PSIS U20

Senior career*
Years	Team	Apps	(Gls)
2020–2024	PSIS Semarang	16	(0)
2023–2024	→ Perserang Serang (loan)	7	(0)
2025–2026	Batavia	6	(0)
- * Club domestic league appearances and goals as of 11 January 2026

Damas Damar Jati (born 18 October 2000) is an Indonesian professional footballer who plays as a defensive midfielder.

== Club career ==
=== PSIS Semarang ===
He was signed for PSIS Semarang to play in Liga 1 in the 2021 season. Damas made his professional debut on 15 October 2021 in a match against Persik Kediri at the Manahan Stadium, Surakarta.

== Career statistics ==
=== Club ===
As of 11 January 2026

Club	Season	League			Cup		Other		Total	
Club	Season	Division	Apps	Goals	Apps	Goals	Apps	Goals	Apps	Goals
PSIS Semarang	2020	Liga 1	0	0	0	0	0	0	0	0
PSIS Semarang	2021–22	Liga 1	10	0	0	0	0	0	10	0
PSIS Semarang	2022–23	Liga 1	6	0	0	0	0	0	6	0
Perserang Serang (loan)	2023–24	Liga 2	7	0	0	0	0	0	7	0
Batavia	2025–26	Liga Nusantara	6	0	0	0	0	0	6	0
Career total			29	0	0	0	0	0	29	0
