= Listianto Raharjo =

Indonesian footballer (1970–2021)

Listiyanto Raharjo
Personal information
- Date of birth: 2 September 1970
- Place of birth: Denpasar, Indonesia
- Date of death: 20 April 2021 (aged 50)
- Place of death: Surabaya, Indonesia
- Position: Goalkeeper

Senior career*
Years	Team	Apps	(Gls)
1994–2001	Pelita Jaya		
2002	PSJS South Jakarta		
2003	Arema Malang		
2004	Persib Bandung		
2005	Pelita Jaya		
2006	Persikota Tangerang		
2007	Persibom Bolaang	12	(0)

International career
1993–1997	Indonesia	11	(0)

Managerial career
- 2010–2011: Bogor Raya (Goalkeeping coach)
- * Club domestic league appearances and goals

Listiyanto Raharjo (2 September 1970 – 20 April 2021) was an Indonesian former footballer who played as a goalkeeper.

== Honours ==
Indonesia

- SEA Games Silver Medal: 1997
