= Revan Nurianto =

Indonesian footballer (born 2002)

Personal information
- Full name: Revan Joni Nurianto
- Date of birth: 14 June 2002 (age 24)
- Place of birth: Bojonegoro, Indonesia
- Height: 1.68 m (5 ft 6 in)
- Position: Winger

Team information
- Current team: Batavia
- Number: 10

Youth career
- 2016–2017: PSBK Blitar
- 2018–2020: Persela Lamongan

Senior career*
Years	Team	Apps	(Gls)
2021–2022	Persela Lamongan	5	(0)
2024–2025	Batavia	6	(0)
2025–2026	Persibo Bojonegoro	8	(0)
2026	Sriwijaya	6	(0)
2026–	Batavia	0	(0)
- * Club domestic league appearances and goals as of 12 April 2026

Revan Joni Nurianto (born 14 June 2002) is an Indonesian professional footballer who plays as a winger for Liga Nusantara club Batavia.

== Club career ==
=== Persela Lamongan ===
He was signed for Persela Lamongan to play in Liga 1 in the 2021 season. Revan made his first-team debut on 4 September 2021 in a match against PSIS Semarang at the Wibawa Mukti Stadium, Cikarang.

== Career statistics ==
=== Club ===
As of 4 November 2021.

Club	Season	League			Cup		Continental		Other		Total	
Club	Season	Division	Apps	Goals	Apps	Goals	Apps	Goals	Apps	Goals	Apps	Goals
Persela Lamongan	2021	Liga 1	5	0	0	0	–		1 (Note: Appearances in Menpora Cup)	0	6	0
Career total			5	0	0	0	0	0	1	0	6	0
