= Diego Mendieta =

Paraguayan footballer (1980–2012)

- Mendieta during his playing days

Personal information
- Full name: Diego Antonio Mendieta Romero
- Date of birth: 13 June 1980
- Place of birth: Asunción, Paraguay
- Date of death: 3 December 2012 (aged 32)
- Place of death: Surakarta, Indonesia
- Position: Forward

Senior career*
Years	Team	Apps	(Gls)
- Johor
2009–2010	Persitara North Jakarta	14	(3)
2011–2012	Persis Solo		(8)
- * Club domestic league appearances and goals

Diego Mendieta (13 June 1980 – 3 December 2012) was a Paraguayan professional footballer who played as a forward. His death on 3 December 2012 reportedly caused by cytomegalovirus, an easily treatable disease, sparked international outrage after it was made known that his club Persis Solo refused to pay his hospital fees, thus resulting in his demise. Persis also owed Mendieta an estimated US$12,500 in salaries which had prevented him from returning to his native Paraguay. The International Federation of Professional Footballers (FIFPro), a worldwide representative organisation for professional football players, dubbed his death as a "disgrace for football".
