= Ambang Stadium =

Multi-use stadium in Kotamobagu, Indonesia

- Stadion Ambang
- Location in Sulawesi and Indonesia Ambang Stadium (Indonesia)
- Location: Kotamobagu, North Sulawesi, Indonesia
- Coordinates: 0.7445°N 124.3184°E
- Owner: Government of Kotamobagu City
- Operator: Government of Kotamobagu City; Government of Bolaang Mongondow Regency
- Capacity: 10,000

Tenant
- Persibom Bolaang Mongondow

Ambang Stadium is a multi-use stadium in Kotamobagu, North Sulawesi, Indonesia. It is currently used mostly for football matches and is used as the home venue for Persibom Bolaang Mongondow. The stadium holds around 10,000 people. In 2025, the local government planned to renovate the stadium.
