= Syahwal Ginting =

Indonesian footballer

Personal information
- Full name: Radzky Syahwal Ginting
- Date of birth: 1 December 2003 (age 22)
- Place of birth: Bekasi, Indonesia
- Height: 1.69 m (5 ft 7 in)
- Positions: Defensive midfielder; right-back

Team information
- Current team: Batavia
- Number: 21

Youth career
- 2020–2021: Persija Jakarta

Senior career*
Years	Team	Apps	(Gls)
2021–2024	Persija Jakarta	1	(0)
2023–2024	→ Sada Sumut (loan)	8	(0)
2024–2026	Dejan	27	(1)
2026–	Batavia	1	(0)
- * Club domestic league appearances and goals as of 13 November 2026

Radzky Syahwal Ginting (born 1 December 2003) is an Indonesian professional footballer who plays as a defensive midfielder or right-back for Liga Nusantara club Batavia.

== Club career ==
=== Persija Jakarta ===
He was signed for Persija Jakarta to play in Liga 1 in the 2021 season. Ginting made his first-team debut on 5 September 2021 as a substitute in a match against PSS Sleman at the Pakansari Stadium, Cibinong.

== International career ==
On 1 July 2022, Ginting received a call-up to the preliminary squad to the Indonesia national under-20 team for the 2022 AFF U-19 Youth Championship.

== Career statistics ==
=== Club ===
As of 13 November 2026.

Club	Season	League			Cup		Other		Total	
Club	Season	Division	Apps	Goals	Apps	Goals	Apps	Goals	Apps	Goals
Persija Jakarta	2021–22	Liga 1	1	0	0	0	0	0	1	0
Persija Jakarta	2022–23	Liga 1	0	0	0	0	2 (Note: Appearances in Indonesia President's Cup)	0	2	0
Persija Jakarta	2023–24	Liga 1	0	0	0	0	0	0	0	0
Sada Sumut (loan)	2023–24	Liga 2	8	0	0	0	0	0	8	0
Dejan	2024–25	Liga 2	14	1	0	0	0	0	14	1
Dejan	2025–26	Liga Nusantara	13	0	0	0	0	0	13	0
Batavia	2026–27	Liga Nusantara	1	0	0	0	0	0	1	0
Career total			37	1	0	0	2	0	39	1

== Honours ==
Dejan

- Liga Nusantara runner-up: 2025–26
