= Alfredo Figueroa =

Chilean footballer (born 1978)

Personal information
- Full name: Alfredo Antonio Figueroa Ahumada
- Date of birth: 27 October 1978 (age 48)
- Place of birth: Llaillay, Chile
- Height: 1.76 m (5 ft 9 1/2 in)
- Position: Striker

Senior career*
Years	Team	Apps	(Gls)
1997–2001	Everton		
2002	Deportes Melipilla	33	(2)
2003	Persebaya Surabaya		
2005	Sông Đà Nam Định		
2006	Persekabpas Pasuruan		(3)
2006–2007	PSIS Semarang	28	(14)
2007	Mitra Kukar		
2007–2008	Persitara North Jakarta	25	(11)
2008–2009	PSM Makassar	21	(8)
2009	Mitra Kukar		
2010	PSM Makassar		
2014	Fundición Chagres		
2018	Peñarol Reinoso		
- * Club domestic league appearances and goals

Alfredo Antonio Figueroa Ahumada (born 27 October 1978) is a Chilean footballer that previously plays for PSM Makassar in the Indonesia Super League.

== Career ==
In his homeland, Figueroa played for Everton and Deportes Melipilla.

In 2003 he moved to Indonesia and joined Persebaya Surabaya. He also played for Persekabpas Pasuruan, PSIS Semarang, Mitra Kukar, Persitara North Jakarta and PSM Makassar.
