= Amir Yusuf Pohan =

Indonesian footballer

Personal information
- Date of birth: 14 September 1971 (age 55)
- Place of birth: Indonesia
- Position: Midfielder

Senior career*
| Years | Team | Apps | (Gls) |
| 1994–1995 | Medan Jaya | 12 | (4) |
| 1995–2000 | PKT Bontang | 63 | (20) |
| 2001–2002 | PS Barito Putera | 25 | (3) |
| 2003–2004 | PSPS Pekanbaru | | |
| 2005 | Persiba Balikpapan | | |
| 2006 | Persibom Bolaang Mongondow | | |

International career
| 2002–2004 | Indonesia | 6 | (0) |
- * Club domestic league appearances and goals

Amir Yusuf Pohan is an Indonesian football midfielder who played for Indonesia at the 2002 AFF Championship. He also played for Medan Jaya, PKT Bontang, PS Barito Putera, PSPS Pekanbaru, Persiba Balikpapan and Persibom Bolaang Mongondow.

== Honours ==
Indonesia

- AFF Championship runner-up: 2002

== Career ==
He scored 17 goals for PKT Bontang in the 1994 season, being in the top ten in the league.

In his post-playing career, he has worked as an assistant coach for Martapura FC. He is also associated with Mandailing FC.
