= Jorge Toledo (footballer) =

Chilean footballer

Personal information
- Full name: Jorge Gabriel Toledo Jofré
- Date of birth: 3 February 1975 (age 51)
- Place of birth: Chile
- Position: Attacking midfielder

Senior career*
Years	Team	Apps	(Gls)
1993–2002	Fernández Vial		(21)
1999–2000	→ Huachipato (loan)	42	(0)
2003	PSM Makassar		(2)
2004	Fernández Vial		(1)
2005–2006	Persmin Minahasa		(11)
2006–2007	Persitara North Jakarta		
2007	Municipal Iquique	8	(1)
2008–2009	Ñublense	1	(0)
2009	Deportes Concepción		
2010	Lord Cochrane	–	(–)
- * Club domestic league appearances and goals

Jorge Gabriel Toledo Jofré (born 3 February 1975) is a Chilean former professional footballer who played as an attacking midfielder for clubs in Chile and Asia.

== Career ==
A left-footed attacking midfielder, Toledo played for Fernández Vial and Huachipato in his homeland before emigrating to Indonesia.

In Indonesia, he played between 2003 and 2007, with a stint with Fernández Vial in 2004. As a player of PSM Makassar, he coincided with his compatriot Oscar Aravena. In Persmin Minahasa, he coincided with another compatriot, Daniel Campos. His last club in that country was Persitara North Jakarta.,

In 2007, he spent some months in the Thai football before returning to Chile and joining Municipal Iquique.

After he played for Ñublense and Deportes Concepción. In 2010, he took part in the Copa Chile Bicentenario as a member of Club Deportivo y Social Lord Cochrane from Concepción, Chile.

== Honours ==
A historical player of Fernández Vial, in 2020 Toledo was selected in the reserve bench of the ideal team of all time by the club fans.
