= Ernesto Brunhoso =

Angolan-Portuguese footballer

Kito
Personal information
- Full name: Ernesto Ferreira Félix Brunhoso
- Date of birth: 5 June 1980 (age 46)
- Place of birth: Luanda, Angola
- Height: 1.80 m (5 ft 11 in)
- Position: Midfielder

Youth career
- 1991–1996: Odivelas
- 1996–2000: Boavista

Senior career*
Years	Team	Apps	(Gls)
1999	Leça	5	(0)
2000–2005	Gondomar	123	(13)
2001–2002	→ Salgueiros (loan)	18	(0)
2005	Olhanense	8	(1)
2006–2007	Diagoras	30	(3)
2007–2088	Fostiras	5	(0)
2008	Ayia Napa	6	(0)
2009	Mafra	8	(0)
2009–2010	Persitara North Jakarta	9	(0)
2010–2011	IK Sirius	10	(1)
2011–2012	Enköpings SK	22	(3)
2011–2012	Procyon BK	11	(0)
- * Club domestic league appearances and goals as of 9 June 2012

Ernesto Ferreira Félix Brunhoso (born 5 June 1980) commonly simple Kito is an Angolan-Portuguese retired footballer.
