= Miguel Domínguez (footballer) =

Paraguayan footballer (born 1979)

Personal information
- Full name: Miguel Angel Domínguez Barreto
- Date of birth: 30 September 1979 (age 47)
- Place of birth: Ciudad del Este, Paraguay
- Height: 1.68 m (5 ft 6 in)
- Position: Midfielder

Senior career*
| Years | Team | Apps | (Gls) |
| 1998– | Cerro Porteño | | |
| 2000– | Tembetary | | |
| 2000 | → Barcelona (loan) | | |
| 2005–2006 | Cerro Corá | | |
| 2006 | PSIS Semarang | 7 | (2) |
| 2007 | Alianza | | |
| 2008–2012 | 12 de Octubre | | |
- * Club domestic league appearances and goals

Miguel Angel Domínguez Barreto (born 30 September 1979 in Ciudad del Este) is a former Paraguayan football player.

== Club career ==
Domínguez began his professional career with Cerro Porteño in the Primera División de Paraguay. He played on loan for Barcelona in Serie A de Ecuador during 2000. Domínguez a chance to experience Liga Indonesia to play for PSIS Semarang in the 2006. At that time he contributed to bringing PSIS Semarang became Runner Up Indonesia Premier Division.

Domínguez had an unsuccessful trial with CS Sedan in September 2001.

== International career ==
Domínguez played for Paraguay at the 1997 and 1999 FIFA World Youth Championships.

== Honours ==
PSIS Semarang

- Liga Indonesia Premier Division runner up: 2006
