= Gustavo Ortiz =

Argentine footballer

Gustavo Hernán Ortiz
Personal information
- Full name: Gustavo Hernan Ortiz
- Date of birth: 10 October 1977 (age 49)
- Place of birth: Buenos Aires, Argentina
- Height: 1.77 m (5 ft 9 1/2 in)
- Position: Midfielder

Senior career*
| Years | Team | Apps | (Gls) |
| 2004–2006 | Persija Jakarta | 37 | (3) |
| 2006–2008 | PSIS Semarang | 42 | (7) |
| 2008–2010 | Persisam Putra Samarinda | 32 | (10) |
| 2010–2012 | Jakarta F.C. | 16 | (4) |
| 2012–2014 | Persibo Bojonegoro | 22 | (2) |
| 2014 | Juventud Antoniana | 17 | (1) |
| Total | | 166 | (27) |
- * Club domestic league appearances and goals

Gustavo Hernan Ortiz (born 10 October 1977 in Almirante Brown Partido, Buenos Aires) is an Argentine footballer.

== Honours ==
PSIS Semarang

- Liga Indonesia Premier Division runner up: 2006

Persisam Putra Samarinda

- Liga Indonesia Premier Division: 2008–09

Persibo Bojonegoro

- Piala Indonesia: 2012
