= Persibom Bolaang Mongondow =

Indonesian football club

Persibom
- Full name: Perserikatan Sepakbola Indonesia Bolaang Mongondow
- Nickname: Laskar Fajar Bulawan
- Founded: 1986; 40 years ago
- Ground: Ambang Stadium
- Capacity: 10,000
- Owner: PSSI Bolaang Mongondow Regency
- Chairman: Farid Suma
- Coach: Vacant
- League: Liga 4
- 2019: Liga 3, eliminated in first round of regional stage
Home colours	Away colours

Perserikatan Sepakbola Indonesia Bolaang Mongondow (simply known as Persibom) is an Indonesian football club based in Bolaang Mongondow Regency, North Sulawesi. They currently compete in the Liga 4 and their homeground is Ambang Stadium.

== History ==
Persibom started their work in the world of national football from the lower division, namely the 2002 Liga Indonesia Second Division. However, this season, they have not been able to move up the division even though they managed to penetrate the Final Round. In the early stages, Persibom won Group F and advanced to the Round of 12. Their progress has stalled in this round and only ranks third in Group M behind Persid Jember and Persibo Bojonegoro.

In the 2003 season, In the Round of 12, Persibom joined Group L and became hosted in the Ambang Stadium. they managed to become group winners with a score of seven points from three matches. In the Big 4 Final Round, Persibom was only runner-up to Persekabpas Pasuruan. Both clubs are also entitled to promotion to Liga Indonesia First Division for next season along with two other clubs, PS Mitra Kukar and Persigo Gorontalo.

== Season by season records ==
Season	League/Division	Tms.	Pos.	Piala Indonesia
2002	Second Division		Third round	–
2003	Second Division	28	2	–
2004	First Division	24	3	–
2005	Premier Division	28	11th, East division	Second round
2006	Premier Division	28	11th, East division	Second round
2007–08	Premier Division	36	10th, East division	First round
2008–09	Premier Division	28	5th, Group 2	–
2009–10	Premier Division	33	Withdrew	–
2011				
2012	Second Division (LPIS)	100	First round	–
2013				
2014
2015
2016
2017	Liga 3	32	Eliminated in provincial round	–
2018	Liga 3	32	Eliminated in provincial round	–
2019	Liga 3	32	Eliminated in provincial round	–

== Former players ==
- Sahari Gultom
- Fandy Mochtar
- Ricky Akbar Ohorella
- Amir Yusuf Pohan
- Listiyanto Raharjo
- (Cameroon) Alexis Tibidi
- Francis Wewengkang
