= Daniel Campos (footballer) =

Chilean footballer

Personal information
- Full name: Daniel Lorenzo Campos Reyman
- Date of birth: 17 July 1981 (age 45)
- Place of birth: Concepción, Chile
- Position: Defender

Youth career
- Deportes Concepción

Senior career*
Years	Team	Apps	(Gls)
2000–2003	Deportes Concepción	44	(2)
2001	→ Universidad de Concepción (loan)		
2003–2005	Huachipato	20	(1)
2005	→ Deportes Puerto Montt (loan)	16	(1)
2005	→ Deportes Concepción (loan)	8	(0)
2006	Persmin Minahasa		(11)
2007–2008	Fernández Vial	61	(5)
2009	Deportes Copiapó	30	(1)
2010	Unión La Calera	0	(0)
2011	IL Varegg	–	(–)
2012	Fernández Vial	–	(–)

International career
2001	Chile U20		
- * Club domestic league appearances and goals

Daniel Lorenzo Campos Reyman (born 17 July 1981) is a Chilean former professional footballer who played as a defender for clubs in Chile, Indonesia and Norway.

== Club career ==
A defender from the Deportes Concepción youth ranks, he won the 2000 national youth championship at under-19 level. With a stint in Universidad de Concepción in 2001, he stayed with Deportes Concepción until 2003, then he moved to Huachipato for the 2003 Torneo Clausura Primera División.

In Chile, he also played for Deportes Puerto Montt, Fernández Vial, Deportes Copiapó and Unión La Calera.

Abroad, he had a stint with Persmin Minahasa in the Liga Indonesia 2006, coinciding with his compatriot Jorge Toledo and becoming the top goalscorer of the club with 11 goals. In 2011, after a trial with Lota Schwager, he moved to Norway and played for IL Varegg in the 3. Divisjon.

His last club was Fernández Vial in the Chilean Tercera División.

== International career ==
Campos represented Chile at under-20 level in both the 2001 South American Championship and the 2001 FIFA World Youth Championship. In addition, he made appearances in friendly matches, even scoring a goal versus Costa Rica U20.

=== Controversies ===
Previous to 2001 FIFA World Youth Championship, Campos and seven other players were arrested in a brothel what must to be closed. The incident was known as "El episodio de las luces rojas" (Chapter of the red lights) due to the excuse employed by Jaime Valdés.

After the tournament, the eight players (Valdés, Millar, Salgado, Pardo, Soto, Droguett, Órdenes and Campos) were suspended for three international matches.

== Honours ==
Deportes Concepción U19

- National Youth Championship: 2000
