= 2006 Liga Indonesia Premier Division =

Liga Indonesia Premier Division
- Season: 2006
- Dates: 14 January – 30 July
- Champions: Persik; 2nd Premier Division title 2nd Indonesian title
- AFC Champions League: Persik; Arema
- Matches: 379
- Goals: 908 (2.4 per match)
- Top goalscorer: Cristian Gonzáles (29 goals)
- Biggest home win: Persik 6–0 PSM (28 February); Persik 7–1 Persegi (10 May); Persikota 6–0 PSDS (10 May); PSDS 6–0 PSIS (24 June)
- Biggest away win: Persipura 0–3 Persik (18 January); Persegi 0–3 Persema (23 April); Persegi 1–4 Persik (23 May)
- Highest scoring: Persik 7–1 Persegi (10 May)

The 2006 Liga Indonesia Premier Division (also known as the Liga Djarum Indonesia for sponsorship reasons) was the 12th season of the Liga Indonesia Premier Division, the top Indonesian professional league for association football clubs.

Due to the effects of the 2006 Yogyakarta earthquake, PSSI and league organizers announced, in a controversial decision, that no teams would be relegated during the season. This was meant to protect PSIM Yogyakarta and PSS Sleman, who withdrew from competition and thus forfeited their remaining matches due to the earthquake.

== Teams ==
=== Team changes ===
==== Relegated from Premier Division ====
- Pelita Krakatau Steel
- Persebaya (punished by PSSI)
- Petrokimia Putra
- PSPS

==== Promoted to Premier Division ====
- Persiwa
- PSIM
- Persitara
- Persiter

=== Stadiums and locations ===
Locations of the teams in the 2006 Liga Indonesia Premier Division.
Blue: West Region; Red: East Region

== First stage ==
=== West Region ===
| Pos | Team | Pld | W | D | L | GF | GA | GD | Pts | Qualification |
|---|---|---|---|---|---|---|---|---|---|---|
| 1 | Arema | 26 | 13 | 8 | 5 | 39 | 17 | +22 | 47 | Advance to second stage |
| 2 | Persija | 26 | 13 | 8 | 5 | 26 | 16 | +10 | 47 | Advance to second stage |
| 3 | PSIS | 26 | 13 | 5 | 8 | 33 | 27 | +6 | 44 | Advance to second stage |
| 4 | Persekabpas | 26 | 12 | 6 | 8 | 35 | 27 | +8 | 42 | Advance to second stage |
| 5 | PSMS | 26 | 12 | 3 | 11 | 31 | 27 | +4 | 39 | |
| 6 | Sriwijaya | 26 | 8 | 10 | 8 | 29 | 24 | +5 | 34 | |
| 7 | Persikota | 26 | 9 | 7 | 10 | 34 | 37 | −3 | 34 | |
| 8 | Persitara | 26 | 10 | 4 | 12 | 29 | 34 | −5 | 34 | |
| 9 | Persijap | 26 | 8 | 9 | 9 | 25 | 27 | −2 | 33 | |
| 10 | Persita | 26 | 8 | 8 | 10 | 25 | 30 | −5 | 32 | |
| 11 | Semen Padang | 26 | 8 | 6 | 12 | 20 | 24 | −4 | 30 | |
| 12 | Persib | 26 | 7 | 8 | 11 | 23 | 30 | −7 | 29 | |
| 13 | PSDS | 26 | 8 | 5 | 13 | 32 | 41 | −9 | 29 | |
| 14 | PSIM (Note: PSIM withdrew from the league due to the 2006 Yogyakarta earthquake; their remaining six games were all scored as 0-3 for their opponents.) | 26 | 7 | 5 | 14 | 23 | 43 | −20 | 26 | |

Source: RSSSF

=== East Region ===
| Pos | Team | Pld | W | D | L | GF | GA | GD | Pts | Qualification |
|---|---|---|---|---|---|---|---|---|---|---|
| 1 | Persmin | 26 | 16 | 2 | 8 | 37 | 26 | +11 | 50 | Advance to second stage |
| 2 | Persik (C) | 26 | 14 | 5 | 7 | 53 | 24 | +29 | 47 | Advance to second stage |
| 3 | PSM | 26 | 12 | 6 | 8 | 44 | 32 | +12 | 42 | Advance to second stage |
| 4 | Persiba | 26 | 12 | 5 | 9 | 35 | 28 | +7 | 41 | Advance to second stage |
| 5 | Persiwa | 26 | 11 | 7 | 8 | 34 | 34 | 0 | 40 | |
| 6 | Persela | 26 | 10 | 8 | 8 | 23 | 23 | 0 | 38 | |
| 7 | Persema | 26 | 11 | 3 | 12 | 39 | 37 | +2 | 36 | |
| 8 | Persipura | 26 | 9 | 8 | 9 | 27 | 23 | +4 | 35 | |
| 9 | Persiter | 26 | 10 | 5 | 11 | 33 | 34 | −1 | 35 | |
| 10 | Bontang PKT | 26 | 10 | 5 | 11 | 33 | 42 | −9 | 35 | |
| 11 | Persibom | 26 | 9 | 6 | 11 | 35 | 46 | −11 | 33 | |
| 12 | Deltras Sidoarjo | 26 | 9 | 5 | 12 | 35 | 32 | +3 | 32 | |
| 13 | PSS (Note: PSS withdrew from the league due to the 2006 Yogyakarta earthquake; their remaining six games were all scored as 0-3 for their opponents.) | 26 | 6 | 5 | 15 | 18 | 40 | −22 | 23 | |
| 14 | Persegi | 26 | 5 | 6 | 15 | 24 | 49 | −25 | 21 | |

Source: RSSSF

== Second stage ==
=== Group A ===
| Pos | Team | Pld | W | D | L | GF | GA | GD | Pts | Qualification |
|---|---|---|---|---|---|---|---|---|---|---|
| 1 | Persik | 3 | 2 | 1 | 0 | 4 | 1 | +3 | 7 | Advance to knockout stage |
| 2 | PSIS | 3 | 2 | 0 | 1 | 3 | 3 | 0 | 6 | Advance to knockout stage |
| 3 | Arema | 3 | 1 | 0 | 2 | 3 | 2 | +1 | 3 | |
| 4 | Persiba | 3 | 0 | 1 | 2 | 0 | 4 | −4 | 1 | |

Source: RSSSF
18 July 2006
15:30 WIB

| Arema | 0–1 | PSIS |
|---|---|---|
| | | Ortiz 81' |

Manahan Stadium, Solo
18 July 2006
19:00 WIB

| Persik | 0–0 | Persiba |

Manahan Stadium, Solo

20 July 2006
15:30 WIB

| Persiba | 0–3 | Arema |
|---|---|---|
| | | Firman 18'; Hita 61'; Aris 80' (pen.) |

Manahan Stadium, Solo
20 July 2006
19:00 WIB

| Persik | 3–1 | PSIS |
|---|---|---|
| Harianto 34'; Gonzáles 81', 87' | | De Porras 50' |

Manahan Stadium, Solo

24 July 2006
15:30 WIB

| Arema | 0–1 | Persik |
|---|---|---|
| | | Harianto 88' |

Manahan Stadium, Solo
24 July 2006
15.30 WIB

| PSIS | 1–0 | Persiba |
|---|---|---|
| Ortiz 63' |

Moh Sarengat Stadium, Batang

=== Group B ===
| Pos | Team | Pld | W | D | L | GF | GA | GD | Pts | Qualification |
|---|---|---|---|---|---|---|---|---|---|---|
| 1 | Persekabpas | 3 | 2 | 1 | 0 | 10 | 4 | +6 | 7 | Advance to knockout stage |
| 2 | Persmin | 3 | 0 | 3 | 0 | 4 | 4 | 0 | 3 | Advance to knockout stage |
| 3 | Persija | 3 | 0 | 2 | 1 | 1 | 3 | −2 | 2 | |
| 4 | PSM | 3 | 0 | 2 | 1 | 3 | 7 | −4 | 2 | |

Source: RSSSF
17 July 2006
15:30 WIB

| Persmin | 2–2 | PSM |
|---|---|---|
| Gray 84'; Toledo 86' | | Baretto 31'; Fagundes 65' |

Petrokimia Stadium, Gresik
17 July 2006
19:00 WIB

| Persija | 1–3 | Persekabpas |
|---|---|---|
| Batoum 2' | | Zah 55'; Figuera 59'; Siswanto 65' |

Petrokimia Stadium, Gresik

19 July 2006
15:30 WIB

| Persekabpas | 2–2 | Persmin |
|---|---|---|
| Zah 90+3'; Achmad 90+4' | | Gray 4'; Campos 19' |

Petrokimia Stadium, Gresik
19 July 2006
19:00 WIB

| Persija | 0–0 | PSM |

Petrokimia Stadium, Gresik

22 July 2006
15:30WIB

| Persmin | 0–0 | Persija |

Petrokimia Stadium, Gresik
22 July 2006
15:30 WIB

| PSM | 1–5 | Persekabpas |
|---|---|---|
| Ahmad 67' | | Kasan 18'; Siswanto 37', 60', 62'; Zah 78' |

Brawijaya Stadium, Kediri

== Knockout stage ==
Semifinals
27 July – Solo
Persik | 3
Persmin | 1
27 July – Solo
Persekabpas | 0
PSIS | 1

Final
30 July – Solo
Persik (a.e.t.) | 1
PSIS | 0

=== Semifinals ===
27 July 2006

| Persik | 3–1 | Persmin |
|---|---|---|
| Gonzáles 18'; Yuli 25'; Sukore 75' | | Toledo 69' (pen.) |

Manahan Stadium, Solo

27 July 2006

| Persekabpas | 0–1 | PSIS |
|---|---|---|
| | | Imral 10' |

Manahan Stadium, Solo

=== Final ===
30 July 2006

| Persik | 1–0 (a.e.t.) | PSIS |
|---|---|---|
| Gonzáles 110' |

Manahan Stadium, Solo
Attendance: 25,000
Referee: Jimmy Napitupulu

== Awards ==
=== Top scorers ===
This is a list of the top scorers from the 2006 season.

| Rank | Player | Club | Goals |
|---|---|---|---|
| 1 | (Uruguay) Cristian Gonzáles | Persik | 29 |
| 2 | (Indonesia) Rahmat Rivai | Persiter | 15 |
| 3 | (Chile) Cristian Carrasco | Persipura | 12 |
| 4 | (Chile) Daniel Campos | Persmin | 11 |
| 4 | (Liberia) Boakay Eddie Foday | Persiwa | 11 |
| 4 | (Guinea) Camara Fode | PKT Bontang | 11 |
| 4 | (Brazil) Hilton Moreira | Deltras | 11 |

=== Best player ===
(Indonesia) Maman Abdurrahman (PSIS)
