= ASIOP F.C. =

Association football team in Indonesia

ASIOP
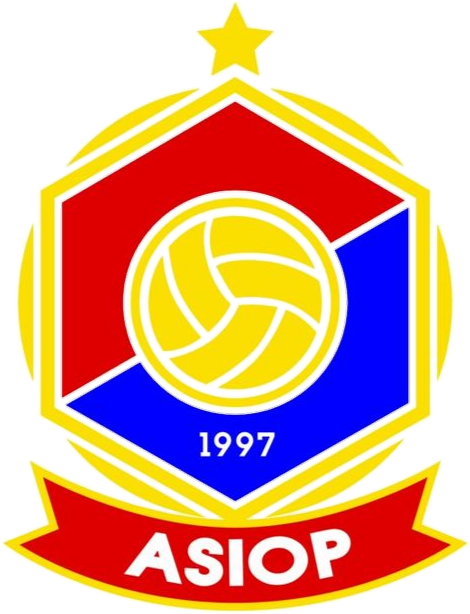
- Full name: Akademi Sepakbola Intinusa Olah Prima Football Club
- Nicknames: Mutiara dari Senayan (Pearl of Senayan)
- Founded: 28 September 1997; 29 years ago
- Ground: ASIOP Stadium
- Capacity: 2,000
- Owner: ASIOP Football Academy
- CEO: Ade Wellington
- Manager: Chandra Syarief
- Coach: Gilang Ramadhan
- League: Liga 4
- 2025–26: 1st (Jakarta zone); First round, 3rd in Group H (National phase)
- Website: http://www.asiopapacinti.com/
Home colours	Away colours

Akademi Sepakbola Intinusa Olah Prima Football Club, commonly known as ASIOP, is an Indonesian football club based in South Jakarta, Jakarta. The club currently competes in the Liga 4.

Established in 1997, ASIOP is a club that started as a football academy club. ASIOP has won several achievements in local, national and international championships.

== History ==
Initially, ASIOP was a soccer school that was founded on 28 September 1997, with the goal of channeling a hobby or talent into football at a young age. ASIOP Football Academy has experienced and licensed coaching instructors with AFC B and/or C-License. And also assisted by licensed trainers.

Until now, ASIOP continues to produce professional and national team players. Currently, there are several players produced by ASIOP, some of whom have careers in Indonesian professional league competitions and are also part of the national team, or have at any point played overseas. Some examples are: Andritany Ardhiyasa, Egi Melgiansyah, Adixi Lenzivio, Airlangga Sutjipto, Syamsir Alam, Fahreza Agamal, Achmad Jufriyanto, Adam Alis, Billy Keraf, Zahra Muzdalifah, Khairul Imam Zakiri, and Rendy Juliansyah.

== Players ==
As of 27 March 2026

Note: Flags indicate national team as defined under FIFA eligibility rules; some limited exceptions apply. Players may hold more than one non-FIFA nationality.

No.	Pos.	Nation	Player
1	GK	IDN	Dafi Muhammad Ikhsani
2	DF	IDN	Alexander Hadiman Bala
3	DF	IDN	Meiko Dwi Akbani
4	DF	IDN	Fairuz Zidan Rabbani
5	DF	IDN	Fauqa Nurikhsan Aziz
6	MF	IDN	Nahar Mubarak Darmawan
7	MF	IDN	Muhamad Ridwan Amrullah
8	MF	IDN	Khairul Imam Zakiri (captain)
9	FW	IDN	Fithran Widho Widandra
10	MF	IDN	Ibnu Sina Arya Yulianto
11	MF	IDN	Xavier Alexei Sulaeman
12	DF	IDN	Pahri Al Mudzaki

No.	Pos.	Nation	Player
13	MF	IDN	Ariel Syahputra
14	MF	IDN	Desly Nur Romandhiance
15	FW	IDN	Prasetyo Eka Bimantara
16	FW	IDN	Farhan Aidyl Fitrah
17	MF	IDN	Muhammad Fikri Rahman
18	MF	IDN	Muhamad Satria Putra
19	DF	IDN	Dida Arsandi
20	DF	IDN	Faathir Mikail
21	GK	IDN	Azelio Afterisya Erdianto
23	DF	IDN	Jamaluddin Rais
25	FW	IDN	Abdullah Jaelani
27	DF	IDN	Raihan Abdul Hakim Hadi Rizki
29	FW	IDN	Ahmad Paisal

== Affiliated clubs ==
- (United States) Brooklyn United

ASIOP cooperates with a club from the United States, Brooklyn United. The two academies are building an international strategic partnership for the development of youth football.

- (Japan) Shonan Bellmare

== Sponsorship ==
The official team sponsors are as follows:

- Mills Sport
- Sompo Insurance Indonesia
- AQUA
- Transtama Logistics
- PT City Trans Utama
- MRA
- PT Arminareka Perdana
- PT Inti Sukses Garmindo
- PT Panca Prima Maju Bersama (PPMB)

== Honours ==
- Liga 3 Jakarta
  - Champion (1): 2023–24
  - Runner-up (1): 2021
- Liga 4 Jakarta
  - Champion (1): 2025–26
  - Runner-up (1): 2024–25
