= Harianto =

Indonesian footballer

Jalu Dharmahusada Harianto
Personal information
- Full name: Harianto
- Date of birth: 26 October 1977 (age 49)
- Place of birth: Malang, Indonesia
- Height: 1.67 m (5 ft 6 in)
- Position: Defender

Senior career*
Years	Team	Apps	(Gls)
1996	Persebaya Surabaya		
1997	Mitra Surabaya		
1998	Persija Jakarta		
1999–2000	Arema Malang		
2001–2010	Persik Kediri		
2010–2011	Persidafon Dafonsoro	10	(0)
2013–2016	Persik Kediri	18	(0)
- * Club domestic league appearances and goals

Harianto (born in Malang, East Java 26 October 1977) is an Indonesian former footballer, he normally plays as a wing back and is 167 cm. Now in Persik he became the captain and team mascot.

He played for Persik in the 2004 AFC Champions League group stage, where he scored one goal.

== Honours ==
Persik Kediri

- Liga Indonesia Premier Division: 2003, 2006
- Liga Indonesia First Division: 2002
