= Jakarta City F.C. =

Association football team in Indonesia

Jakarta City
- Full name: Jakarta City Football Club
- Nickname: The Batavian
- Short name: JCFC
- Founded: 2020; 6 years ago
- Ground: Kamal Muara Stadium
- Capacity: 10,000
- Owner: PT Jakarta City Cemerlang
- Chairman: M. Jaelani Saputra
- Manager: Murtana
- Coach: Aep Berlian
- League: Liga 4
- 2021: 3rd in Group D, (Jakarta zone)
Home colours	Away colours

Jakarta City Football Club (formerly known as Putra Citra Muda FC) is an Indonesian football club based in North Jakarta, Jakarta. They currently competes in Liga 4 Jakarta Zone and their homebase is Kamal Muara Stadium.
