= ABC Wirayudha F.C. =

Association football team in Indonesia

ABC Wirayudha
- Full name: Anak Betawi Cahaya Wirayudha Football Club
- Nicknames: Macan Perang (War Tigers)
- Short name: ABC
- Founded: 5 October 1978; 48 years ago
- Ground: Gongseng Field; East Jakarta, Jakarta
- Capacity: 2,000
- Owner: PT ABC Wirayudha
- Chairman: Ibnu Rachman Jaya
- Manager: Trijaya Hadiyansah
- Coach: Budi Yanto
- League: Liga 4
- 2021: 6th in Group D, (Liga 3 Jakarta zone)
- Website: abcwirayudhafc.com
Home colours	Away colours

Anak Betawi Cahaya Wirayudha Football Club (simply known as ABC Wirayudha) is an Indonesian football club based in East Jakarta, Jakarta. They currently competes in Liga 4.
