= Batavia F.C. =

Indonesian football club

Batavia
- Full name: Batavia Football Club
- Nickname: The Batavians
- Founded: 2010; 16 years ago
- Ground: Soemantri Brodjonegoro Stadium
- Capacity: 5,000
- Owner: Gede Widiade
- Coach: Charis Yulianto
- League: Liga Nusantara
- 2025–26: Liga Nusantara, Quarter-finals
- Website: batavia-fc.id
Home colours	Away colours

Batavia Football Club is an Indonesian football club based in South Jakarta, Special Capital Region of Jakarta. They currently compete in Liga Nusantara, the third tier of Indonesian football after promotion from Liga 4 in 2024–25. and their homebase is Soemantri Brodjonegoro Stadium.

== History ==
Batavia Football Club was founded in 2010. They play their home games at the Soemantri Brodjonegoro Stadium in South Jakarta. Initially, Muhammad Firdaus of the RMD Foundation established the club as a soccer-based school; subsequently, Batavia participated in competitions organized by the Asprov PSSI Jakarta and the provincial Liga 3 (now Liga 4) when the league was first formed.

In 2021, Batavia was officially acquired by Gede Widiade, the owner of Pancoran Soccer Field Group (PSF Group). In the 2021 season, Batavia won the 2021 Liga 3 Jakarta after defeating ASIOP 1–0 in the final; this marked the club’s first title in its history.

Ahead of the 2024–25 season, Batavia has officially signed Charis Yulianto, a coach and former Indonesian national team player—as their new head coach to lead the team in the Liga 4 Jakarta zone. Batavia went on to win the 2024–25 Liga 4 Jakarta, which featured 22 teams. They also qualified for the Round of 64 of the 2024–25 Liga 4 national phase. In the final match at Tugu Stadium on 17 April 2025, they defeated ASIOP 2–0. This marked their second title in the club’s history. Overall, in the 2024–25 Liga 4 Jakarta—which featured 22 teams—they remained undefeated in their six matches. They recorded five wins, one draw, and a fantastic goal differential of 34–0 without conceding a single goal.

On 14 May 2025, Batavia secured promotion to Liga Nusantara (third tier) for the first time in their history from next season after draw against Persibat Batang 1–1 at the Mandala Krida Stadium, Yogyakarta in the Liga 4 national phase third round at Group A.

== Players ==
=== Current squad ===
As of November 2026

Note: Flags indicate national team as defined under FIFA eligibility rules; some limited exceptions apply. Players may hold more than one non-FIFA nationality.

No.	Pos.	Nation	Player
1	GK	IDN	Reza Ardiansyah
4	DF	IDN	Gevin Simopiaref
5	DF	IDN	Muhammad Khosiin
6	MF	IDN	Radittia Agustin
7	FW	IDN	Brian Bagaskara
8	MF	IDN	Reza Alfariz
9	MF	IDN	Misbakhul Choiri
10	FW	IDN	Revan Nurianto
11	FW	IDN	Ferry Cahyo
15	DF	IDN	Fahad Abdullah (captain)
16	MF	IDN	Rafly Aziz
18	FW	IDN	Farhan Aidyl
19	DF	IDN	Saiful Arifin
21	MF	IDN	Syahwal Ginting
24	DF	IDN	Noer Wahid

No.	Pos.	Nation	Player
25	FW	IDN	Faozan Tamami
31	MF	IDN	Ardian Syahputra
41	MF	IDN	Arkaan Putra
44	DF	IDN	Syukron Al Hamdi
49	MF	IDN	Danilo Mote
54	FW	IDN	Marcell Rumkabu
57	GK	IDN	Ahmad Muhazir
67	DF	IDN	Syarif Rafa
71	GK	IDN	Rahmad Hidaya
87	MF	IDN	Alarice Nesta
91	MF	IDN	Chandra Riyanto
97	FW	IDN	Mikhail Siholnaune
99	DF	IDN	Romeo Milano

== Season-by-season records ==
Season	League	Tier	Tms.	Pos.	Piala Indonesia
2017	Liga 3	3	32	eliminated in provincial phase	—
2018	Liga 3	3	32	eliminated in provincial phase	—
2019	Liga 3	3	32	eliminated in provincial phase	—
2020	Liga 3	3	season abandoned		—
2021–22	Liga 3	3	64	4th, first round	—
2022–23	Liga 3	3	season abandoned		—
2023–24	Liga 3	3	80	eliminated in provincial phase	—
2024–25	Liga 4	4	64	3rd, fourth round	—
2025–26	Liga Nusantara	3	24	Quarter-finalist	—
2026–27	Liga Nusantara	3	24	TBD	—

== Honours ==
- Liga 3 Jakarta
  - Champion (1): 2021
- Liga 4 Jakarta
  - Champion (1): 2024–25
