= UMS 1905 =

Indonesian football club

- Full name: Union Makes Strength
- Short name: UMS
- Founded: 15 December 1905; 120 years ago
- Ground: UMS Petak Sinkian Stadium; West Jakarta, Jakarta
- Owner: PSSI West Jakarta
- Coach: Arifin Adam
- League: Liga 4
- 2021–22: Liga 3, Round of 64 (National)
Home colours	Away colours

UMS 1905 or Union Makes Strength is an Indonesian football club based in West Jakarta, Jakarta. They currently compete in Liga 4 and their homebase is UMS Petak Sinkian Stadium.

== History ==
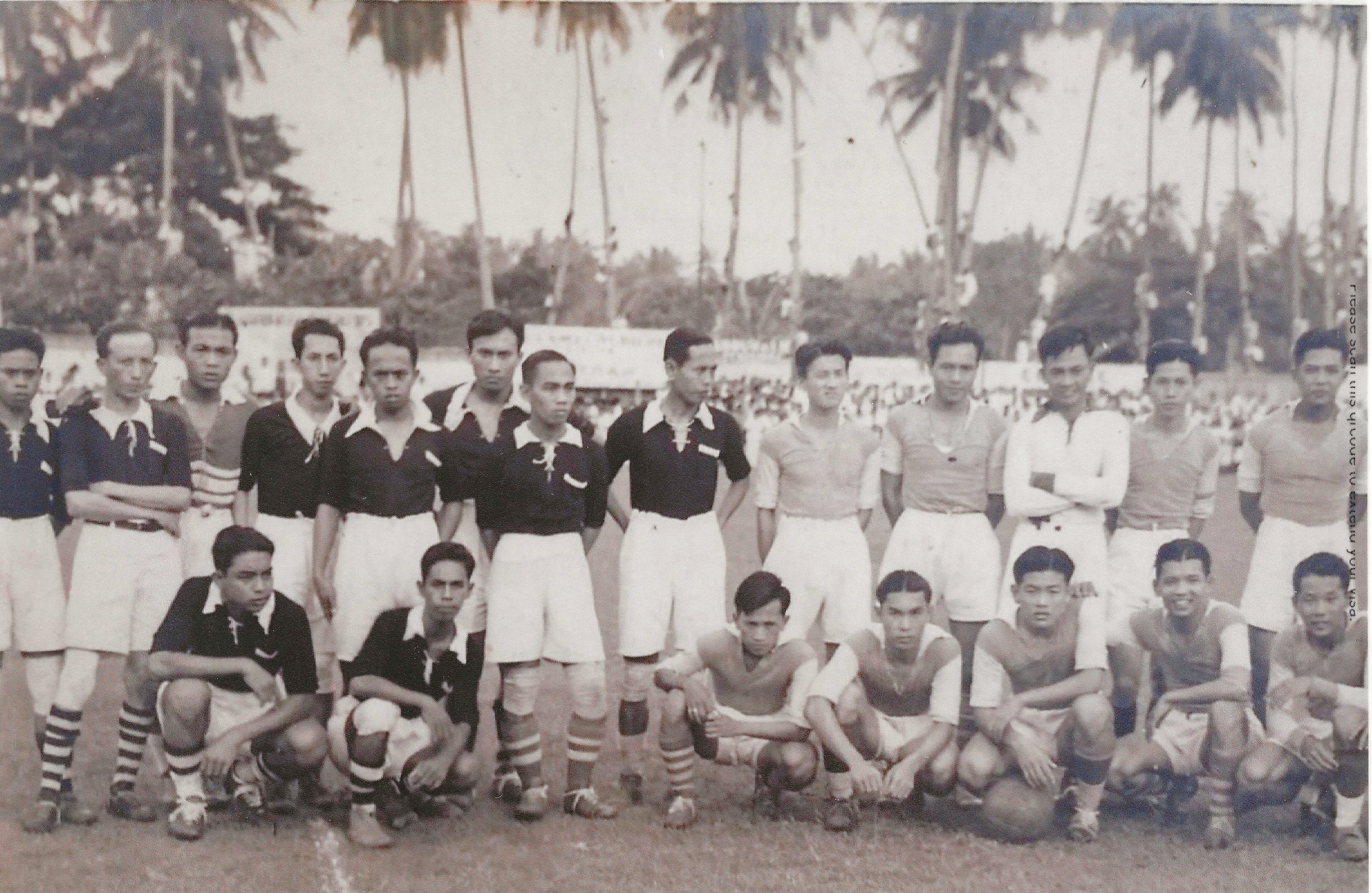
UMS 1905 squad (right) in the championship, 1934.

Union Makes Strength is one of the "POR" (Perkoempoelan Olah Raga; lit. 'sports association') in DKI Jakarta. This club was established on 15 December 1905, under the name Tiong Hoa Oen Tong Hwee (THOTH). Initially, this POR prioritized athletics. At this moment Union Makes Strength has football, ball, and tennis teams. Meanwhile, a football club from Chinese ethnicity, namely Tiong Hoa Hwee Koan (Pa Hua) FC, was founded on 20 February 1912. Exactly on 2 August 1914 by its founders, Oey Keng Seng and Louw Hap Ie, then the name Tiong Hoa Hwee Koan was changed to Union Makes Strength (UMS).

At first the club rented the field from the football club Donar (Tjih Ying Hwei). In 1913, UMS had its own field by renting a garden belonging to a native named Haji Manaf at a rate of 6 guilders a month. The field, which was still a garden, was later turned into a field with the founder's personal money. UMS is also known as an association that likes to visit other associations outside Jakarta such as Cirebon, Bandung, and Surabaya. In 1923, with the agreement of its members, THOTH merged into UMS. In honor of THOTH, 15 December 1905 was considered the founding of UMS.

In 1920, UMS merged under the auspices of West Java Voetbalbond which later became Voetbalbond Batavia Omstreken (VBO). UMS won the VBO many times, such as in 1930, 1932, 1933, 1934, 1937, 1938, and 1949. On 26 February 1950, UMS began accepting indigenous people. UMS then made Mohammad Djamiat Dalhar, a son of Betawi, a member who later became famous. September 1951, VBO disbanded and then the name VIJ rose, which has now changed its name to Persija Jakarta. And throughout the 1950s UMS entered into Persija's internal competition, so that its existence was maintained.

Currently, UMS 1905 is competing in Liga 3 DKI Jakarta which is under the auspices of Asprov PSSI DKI Jakarta and Askot PSSI West Jakarta. Then, now UMS 1905 is back on its own and is not part of Persija's internal organization. On 10 April 2025, the club recorded their biggest defeat with a score of 1–16 against Taruma in the 2024–25 Liga 4 Special Region of Jakarta.

== Honours ==
- Chineesche Stedenwedstrijden
  - Champions (11): 1917, 1919, 1920, 1923, 1924, 1926, 1930, 1932–33, 1935, 1936, 1939
- VBO Competition
  - Champions (7): 1930, 1932, 1933, 1934, 1937, 1938, 1949
- Liga 3 Jakarta
  - Third-place (1): 2021

== Ground ==
UMS Petak Sinkian Stadium, located at Ubi Road 10 C, Mangga Besar, Taman Sari, West Jakarta is the headquarters of the UMS 1905.
