= Urakan F.C. =

Association football team in Indonesia

Urakan
- Full name: Ulet Rajin Kreatif Anti Narkoba Football Club
- Nickname: The Good Youth
- Short name: UFC
- Founded: 1986; 40 years ago
- Ground: Gedong Soccer Field; East Jakarta, Jakarta
- Capacity: 600
- Owner: Askot PSSI Jakarta Timur
- Coach: Sukabar
- League: Liga 4
- 2021: 4th in Group B, (Jakarta zone)
Home colours	Away colours

Ulet Rajin Kreatif Anti Narkoba Football Club, simply known as Urakan, is an Indonesian football club based in East Jakarta, Jakarta. They currently competes in Liga 4.

== Honours ==
- ISC Liga Nusantara Jakarta
  - Champions (1): 2016
