= PS Pemuda Jaya =

Association football team in Indonesia

- Full name: Persatuan Sepakbola Pemuda Jaya
- Nickname: Laskar Pemuda Jakarta
- Short name: PSPJ
- Founded: 28 October 1959; 66 years ago
- Ground: GOR Pondok Bambu Stadium; East Jakarta, Jakarta
- Capacity: 1,000
- Owner: PSSI East Jakarta
- CEO: Erwin Mahyudin
- Coach: Ahmad Fatoni
- League: Liga 4
- 2021: 4th in Group A, (Jakarta zone)
Home colours	Away colours

Persatuan Sepakbola Pemuda Jaya (simply known as PS Pemuda Jaya) is an Indonesian football club based in East Jakarta, Jakarta. They currently competes in Liga 4. The establishment of this club was originally only a youth organization during the period of filling the independence of Indonesia
