= Persija Barat =

Indonesian football club

- Full name: Persatuan Sepakbola Indonesia Jakarta Barat
- Nicknames: Pasukan Barat (Western Army); Cupang Serit (Betta Fish)
- Founded: 11 March 1979; 47 years ago
- Ground: Cendrawasih Stadium; Cengkareng, West Jakarta, Jakarta
- Capacity: 8,000
- Owner: PT. Jakarta Prima Bola
- CEO: Taufiq Jursal
- Manager: Bayu Guntoro
- League: Liga 4
- 2021: 4th, (Jakarta zone)
Home colours	Away colours

Persatuan Sepakbola Indonesia Jakarta Barat, commonly known as Persija Barat, is an Indonesian football club based in West Jakarta, Jakarta. This club played at Liga 4 Jakarta zone.
