= Jaksel F.C. =

Indonesian football club

Jaksel
- Full name: Jakarta Selatan Football Club
- Nickname: The Spirit of the South
- Founded: 1975; 51 years ago as PSJS South Jakarta; 2022; 4 years ago as Jaksel Football Club
- Ground: Soemantri Brodjonegoro Stadium
- Capacity: 5,000
- Chairman: Tri Joko Susilo
- Manager: Avie Farhabie Putra
- Coach: Yunus Muchtar
- League: Liga 4
- 2025–26: 2nd (Jakarta zone); First round, 3rd in Group J (National phase)
Home colours	Away colours

Jakarta Selatan Football Club or Jaksel (formerly known as PSJS South Jakarta) is an Indonesian football club based in South Jakarta, Jakarta. They currently competes in Liga 4.

== Honours ==
- Liga 4 Jakarta
  - Runner-up (1): 2025–26
