= Jakarta United F.C. =

Indonesian football club

Jakarta United
- Full name: Jakarta United Football Club
- Nicknames: Macan Tutul (The Leopards)
- Founded: 2005; 21 years ago as Jakarta Timur; 2018; 8 years ago as Jakarta United
- Ground: Soemantri Brodjonegoro Stadium, Kuningan, South Jakarta, DKI Jakarta
- Capacity: 10,000
- Owner: PT Sinergi Global Sportama
- Coach: Aji Bintara
- League: Liga 4
- 2021: Quarter-finals (Jakarta zone)
Home colours	Away colours

Jakarta United Football Club (formerly known as Jakarta Timur Football Club) is an Indonesian football club based in South Jakarta, Jakarta. They play in Liga 4. Their home ground is Soemantri Brodjonegoro Stadium, which is situated in Kuningan, South Jakarta, Jakarta.
