= Tugu Stadium =

Football stadium in Jakarta, Indonesia

- Interactive map of Tugu Stadium
- Location: South Tugu, Koja, North Jakarta, Jakarta
- Coordinates: 6°08′13″S 106°54′49″E
- Owner: Jakarta Education and Sports Office
- Capacity: 4,000
- Surface: artificial turf

Construction
- Groundbreaking: 1987; 39 years ago
- Renovated: October 2022
- Cost: 181 billion IDR
- Main contractor: Jaya Konstruksi Ltd.

Tenant
- Persitara

Tugu Stadium is a football stadium located at South Tugu, Koja, in North Jakarta, Jakarta. It is the base of the Liga Nusantara team, Persitara North Jakarta. Its capacity is around 4,000 spectators.

== History ==
Tugu Stadium was built in 1987. It was a built on swampland where snakes were found. The stadium underwent renovation and land rehabilitation in 2006–2007; the renovation was completed in 2008. Further refurbishment was undertaken in 2012.

== Facilities ==
The stadium is equipped with pitch and field facilities, lighting with a power of 2,500 watts, changing rooms, toilets, management room, ample parking space and spectator stands with a capacity of 4,000 people. Tugu Stadium has an area of 35,000 square metres (380,000 sq ft), with a soccer pitch area of 7,346.49 m^{2} (79,077.0 sq ft). The area of the track field is 3,600 m^{2} (39,000 sq ft), the area of the west tribune is 870.40 m^{2} (9,368.9 sq ft), the area of the east tribune is 205.19 square metres (2,208.6 sq ft), and the east parking lot area is 2,850 square metres (30,700 sq ft). In addition, it has office space under the stands and a room that functions as a surau or prayer room.

== Renovation ==
The stadium underwent redevelopment and rehabilitation in 2006–2007 and was handed over in 2008. It was renovated again in 2012.

The DKI Jakarta Provincial Government planned a further redevelopment for the stadium, a complete renovation, for 2022. Total rehabilitation of the stadium is to be FIFA certified and is to include MSME facilities. The Governor of DKI Jakarta, Anies Baswedan said that the renovation is intended to bring the stadium to an international standard. The plan was conveyed while attending the celebration of the 42nd anniversary of Persitara North Jakarta.

The stadium revitalization is planned to be carried out in two stages. The first phase focuses on pitch (field) development. The second phase focuses on the construction of supporting facilities such as stands. The redevelopment is expected to be completed in December 2023, using a total budget of 181 billion Indonesian rupiah.
