= Persitara North Jakarta =

Indonesian football club

Persitara Jakarta Utara
- Full name: Persatuan Sepakbola Indonesia Jakarta Utara
- Nicknames: Laskar Si Pitung (Pitung's Warriors)
- Founded: 29 December 1979; 46 years ago
- Ground: Tugu Stadium
- Capacity: 4,000
- Owner: PT. Persitara Sejahtera
- Chairman: M. Nuh
- Manager: Suaib
- Coach: Mohamad Firdaus
- League: Liga Nusantara
- 2025–26: Liga Nusantara, 5th (Group B); Relegation play-off winner
Home colours	Away colours

Persatuan Sepakbola Indonesia Jakarta Utara (simply known as Persitara Jakarta Utara) is an Indonesian football club based in North Jakarta, Special Capital Region of Jakarta. They have been competing in Liga Nusantara since 2025–26 season, the third tier of Indonesian football after promotion from Liga 4 in 2024–25 season. The club's home base is the Tugu Stadium.

== History ==
The history of the founding of Persitara itself cannot be separated from the role of Persija as the parent of Jakarta football. In the 1970s, Persija, which was still part of the West Java PSSI Regional Commission, initiated the formation of its own Regional Commission in Jakarta. The reason is that the Macan Kemayoran, Persija's nickname, are having difficulty accommodating the increasing number of local football clubs.

The formation of the Jakarta PSSI Regional Commission coincided with the establishment of "other Persija", namely Persijatimut (North-East) and Persijaselbar (South-West). Persijatimut split and then Persitara officially stood alone with the name of the Persatuan Sepakbola Indonesia Jakarta Utara (Persitara) in 1985.

Initially, the club nicknamed Laskar Si Pitung was founded in 1979 (some sources say 1975) using the name Persija Timur Utara (Persijatimut) and only then in 1985 did this club officially use the name Persitara North Jakarta which was considered to truly represent the people of North Jakarta. Persitara was one of the contestants in the 2008–09 Indonesia Super League, the most elite competition in Indonesia at that time.

In the Perserikatan era, Persitara's best achievement occurred in the 1985–86 season, when it successfully broke into the Perserikatan Premier Division. As with other football clubs from Jakarta, Persitara is run solely with the support of the Jakarta Regional Budget (APBD). However, since its founding, Persitara has not received the same amount of public funds as its 'older sibling', Persija Jakarta.

The peak was when the leadership of Jakarta was held by Governor Sutiyoso for two terms, Persitara was not taken into account at all and was only considered as a complementary team. Moreover, with the emergence of the slogan "Jakarta Satu" lit. 'One Jakarta', which is only one football club that appears to represent Jakarta. It is seen from the APBD funds obtained. Persija received APBD funds of around 22 billion IDR, while Persitara only got 3 billion IDR.

Not receiving any attention from Jakarta Provincial Government, Persitara's achievements dropped drastically, to the point of being in the lowest division, Second Division in the 2002 season. Since then, Persitara, which was accepted as a member of the Football Association of Indonesia since 1980, has started to rebuild the club. In 2006, the club finally made it to the Indonesia Super League, which was its second season.

The 2010s were a difficult time for Persitara, after being relegated from the highest division, the dualism of the competition at that time, Indonesia Super League (ISL) and Indonesia Premier League (IPL) in 2011 to 2013 was getting hotter, the emergence of Batavia Union in the IPL competition split the club, Batavia Union itself is a splinter club from Persitara North Jakarta which was founded in 2010. In addition, the acute financial crisis that is eating away at the club is starting to show its effects. In the 2014 Premier Division, Persitara is in arrears in player salaries. The club management was even unable to rent Tugu Stadium so they failed to hold a home match. Persitara was then relegated to Third Division.

For the 2024–25 season, the formation of a new league under the PSSI Provincial Association places the club in Liga 4 Jakarta zone. This season they managed to advance to the semi-finals after losing 3–5 on penalties to Batavia after a 0–0 draw. In the fight for third place they beat Jakarta United with a score of 6–1.

On 14 May 2025, Persitara secured promotion to Liga Nusantara for the first time in their history from next season after win against PS Mojokerto Putra with narrowly 1–0 at Sultan Agung Stadium, Bantul in the Liga 4 national phase third round at Group A.

In 2025–26 Liga Nusantara, they have finished at 5th place on Group B table. So that they qualified for relegation play-off against PSDS Deli Serdang. In their final decisive match against PSDS on 1 February 2026, they managed to survive in the third tier after a 1–0 win over PSDS. A single goal scored by Ikhsan Nur Fadilah at the 77th minute of the match.

== Sponsors ==
- Adhoc Apparel
- Bosowa Corp
- Bank DKI
- Forum RT/RW DKI Jakarta
- Firdaus Hospital
- Bogasari
- Ancol Dreamland
- JICT
- Dunia Fantasi

== Players ==
=== Current squad ===
As of November 2026

Note: Flags indicate national team as defined under FIFA eligibility rules; some limited exceptions apply. Players may hold more than one non-FIFA nationality.

No.	Pos.	Nation	Player
5	DF	IDN	Mizan Agin
7	MF	IDN	Rosyid Irvani
10	MF	IDN	Zardan Aroby
11	FW	IDN	Firmansyah Ahmad
12	MF	IDN	Muhammad Kandias
13	DF	IDN	Naufal Choliq
17	MF	IDN	Al Wino Zacqy
19	MF	IDN	Alfredo Arya
20	GK	IDN	Dastin Mahardika
21	FW	IDN	Orlen Islami
22	GK	IDN	Zahid Amel
24	MF	IDN	Dalmiansyah Matutu
25	DF	IDN	Fadhil Akash
26	MF	IDN	Muhammad Mishbah
29	FW	IDN	Ajik Mashudi
30	DF	IDN	Emir Reza
33	DF	IDN	Daffa Al Nugraha

No.	Pos.	Nation	Player
39	FW	IDN	Reja Kurniawan
53	DF	IDN	Gesang Hidayatullah
66	DF	IDN	Ardan Fibryan
69	FW	IDN	Risal
71	FW	IDN	Ryan Pamungkas
77	FW	IDN	Zarhan Fahrezi
88	MF	IDN	Ibnu Sina
89	MF	IDN	Kakang Juventus
91	DF	IDN	Wahyu Kurniawan
95	GK	IDN	Reigi Al Farizi
96	FW	IDN	Hazel Werkudoro
97	FW	IDN	Yadi Mulyadi (Captain)
99	FW	IDN	Abdullah Jaelani

== Coaching staff ==
Position	Name
Head coach	(Indonesia) Mohamad Firdaus
Assistant coach	(Indonesia) Tedi Berlian
Goalkeeper coach	(Indonesia) Erry Abdulah
Fitness coach	(Indonesia) Eko Wiguna
Physiotherapist	(Indonesia) Ariansyah Fitriandani

== Season-by-season records ==
Season(s)	League/Division	Tier	Teams	Pos.	Piala Indonesia
1994–95	First Division	2	16	First round	–
1995–96	First Division	2	24	First round	–
1996–97	First Division	2	20	5th, second round	–
1997–98	First Division	2	season abandoned		–
1998–99	First Division	2	19	4th	–
1999–2000	First Division	2	21	5th, Central Region (Group II)	–
2001	First Division	2	24	5th, Central Region (Group II)	–
2002	First Division	2	27	7th, Group 2	–
2003	Second Division	3	28	3rd, Group C	–
2004	Second Division	3	41	4th, third round	–
2005	First Division	2	30	4 th	First round
2006	Premier Division	1	28	8th, West Division	Second round
2007–08	Premier Division	1	36	7th, West Division	First round
2008–09	Indonesia Super League	1	18	14th	Quarter-finals
2009–10	Indonesia Super League	1	18	18th	First round
2010–11	Premier Division	2	39	7th, Group 1	–
2011–12	Premier Division	2	22	5th, Group 1	Second round
2013	Premier Division	2	38	8th, Group 2	–
2014	Premier Division	2	60	withdrew	–
2015	Liga Nusantara	3	season abandoned		–
2016	ISC Liga Nusantara	3	32		–
2017	Liga 3	3	32	eliminated in provincial phase	–
2018	Liga 3	3	32	eliminated in provincial phase	–
2019	Liga 3	3	32	eliminated in provincial phase	–
2020	Liga 3	3	season abandoned		–
2021–22	Liga 3	3	64	eliminated in provincial phase	–
2022–23	Liga 3	3	season abandoned		–
2023–24	Liga 3	3	80	4th, first round	–
2024–25	Liga 4	4	64	4th, fourth round	–
2025–26	Liga Nusantara	3	24	Relegation play-off winner	–
2026-27	Liga Nusantara	3	24	TBD	–

Champion	Runner-up	Promotion	Relegation

== Notable former players ==
=== Foreign players ===
- (Argentina) Alfredo Figueroa
- (Cameroon) Armand Bassoken
- (Canada) Ladislas Bushiri
- (Chile) Javier Roca
- (Iran) Afshin Parsaeian
- (Iran) Vali Khorsandipish
- (Japan) Hisanori Takada
- (Liberia) Esaiah Pello Benson
- (Liberia) Eugene Gray
- (Liberia) John Tarkpor
- (Nigeria) Kabir Bello
- (Paraguay) Diego Mendieta
- (Portugal) Ernesto Brunhoso
- (Singapore) Itimi Dickson
- (South Korea) Kim Jong-Kyung

=== Local players ===
- (Indonesia) Amarzukih
- (Indonesia) Ardi Idrus
- (Indonesia) Gendut Doni Christiawan
- (Indonesia) Kurniawan Dwi Yulianto
- (Indonesia) Oktavianus Maniani
- (Indonesia) Rahmat Rivai
- (Indonesia) Supra Lestusen
- (Indonesia) Tantan
