= List of foreign Liga Primer Indonesia players =

This is a list of foreign football players who plays or played in the Liga Primer Indonesia.

== Angola ==
- Amâncio Fortes – Semarang United – 2011
- David Kuagica – Minangkabau F.C. – 2011
- Maurito – Minangkabau F.C. – 2011

== Argentina ==
- Oscar Alegre – Bogor Raya F.C. – 2011
- Juan Darío Batalla – Real Mataram – 2011
- Diego Bogado – Bogor Raya F.C. – 2011
- Juan Manuel Cortez – Batavia Union – 2011
- Guillermo Imhoff – Bali Devata – 2011
- Leandro – Batavia Union – 2011
- Leonardo Moyano – Jakarta F.C. – 2011
- Gustavo Hernan Ortiz – Jakarta F.C. – 2011
- Emanuel De Porras – Jakarta F.C. – 2011
- Luciano Rimoldi – Bogor Raya F.C. – 2011
- Fernando Gaston Soler – Real Mataram – 2011

== Australia ==
- Fred Agius – Cendrawasih Papua – 2011
- Andrew Barisic – Persebaya 1927 – 2011
- Robert Gaspar – Persema Malang – 2011
- Andrija Jukic – Bogor Raya F.C. – 2011
- Mario Karlovic – Minangkabau F.C. – 2011
- Josh Maguire – Semarang United – 2011
- David Micevski – Solo F.C. – 2011
- Srećko Mitrović – PSM Makassar – 2011
- Steve Pantelidis – Bintang Medan – 2011
- Billy Quinncroft – Bogor Raya F.C. – 2011
- Goran Šubara – PSM Makassar – 2011
- Milan Susak – Minangkabau F.C. – 2011
- Aleks Vrteski – Solo F.C. – 2011
- Daniel Wilkinson – Cendrawasih Papua – 2011

== Brazil ==
- Amaral – Manado United – 2011
- Amarildo – Semarang United – 2011
- Márcio Bambu – Cendrawasih Papua – 2011
- Carlos Eduardo Bizarro – Persibo Bojonegoro – 2011
- Otávio Dutra – Persebaya 1927 – 2011
- Luís Feitoza – Tangerang Wolves – 2011
- Victor Hugo – Tangerang Wolves – 2011
- Juninho – Minangkabau F.C. – 2011
- Jardel Santana – Manado United – 2011
- Renan Silva – Persija Jakarta – 2018–
- Wallace – Tangerang Wolves – 2011
- Wallacer de Andrade Medeiros – Persibo Bojonegoro – 2011

== Cameroon ==
- Alain N'Kong – Atjeh United – 2011
- Ngon Mamoun – Persema Malang – 2011
- Pierre Njanka – Atjeh United – 2011
- Seme Pierre – Persema Malang – 2011
- Felix Yetna – Manado United – 2011

== Chile ==
- Christian Febre – Real Mataram – 2011
- Luis Eduardo Hicks – Medan Chiefs – 2011
- Javier Rocha – Batavia Union – 2011

== Côte d'Ivoire ==
- Eugène Dadi – Manado United – 2011

== England ==
- Lee Hendrie – Bandung F.C. – 2011

== France ==
- Kevin Yann – Medan Chiefs – 2011

== Germany ==
- Patrick Ghigani – Cendrawasih Papua – 2011

== Iran ==
- Amir Amadeh – Persibo Bojonegoro – 2011
- Javad Moradi – Bandung F.C. – 2011
- Ali Parhizi – Bali Devata – 2011
- Hossein Shiri – Manado United – 2011

== Italy ==
- Raffaele Simone Quintieri – Semarang United – 2011

== Latvia ==
- Deniss Romanovs – Cendrawasih Papua – 2011

== Liberia ==
- Perry N Somah – Bandung F.C. – 2011
- John Tarkpor Sonkaley – Persebaya 1927 – 2011

== Luxembourg ==
- Benoît Lang – Persema Malang – 2011

== Macedonia ==
- Michael Cvetkovski – Persebaya 1927 – 2011

== Montenegro ==
- Ilija Spasojević – Bali Devata – 2011

== Morocco ==
- Laakkad Abdelhadi – Medan Chiefs – 2011

== Netherlands ==
- (Indonesia) Bryan Bono Brard – Medan Chiefs – 2011
- (Indonesia) Dane Dwight Brard – Medan Chiefs – 2011
- Pascal Heije – Bali Devata – 2011
- (Indonesia) Regilio Jacobs – Tangerang Wolves – 2011
- (Indonesia) Jordy de Kat – Tangerang Wolves – 2011
- Richard Knopper – PSM Makassar – 2011
- (Indonesia) Raphael Maitimo – Bali Devata – 2011
- (Indonesia) Ferd Pasaribu – Medan Chiefs – 2011
- (Indonesia) Gaston Salasiwa – Bintang Medan – 2011

== Nigeria ==
- Michael Onwatuegwu – Bandung F.C. – 2011

== Portugal ==
- Guti Ribeiro – Bintang Medan – 2011

== Romania ==
- Cosmin Vancea – Bintang Medan – 2011

== Russia ==
- Sergei Aleksandrovich Litvinov – Solo F.C. – 2011

== Serbia ==
- Žarko Lazetić – Solo F.C. – 2011
- Stevan Račić – Solo F.C. – 2011

== Singapore ==
- Shahril Ishak – Medan Chiefs – 2011
- Baihakki Khaizan – Medan Chiefs – 2011

== South Korea ==
- Na Byung-Yul – Batavia Union – 2011
- Park Chan-Yong – Tangerang Wolves – 2011
- Park Dae-Sik – Atjeh United – 2011
- Yum Dong-Jin – Atjeh United – 2011
- Ahn Hyo-Yeon – Bintang Medan – 2011
- Kim Jong-Kyung – Batavia Union – 2011
- Kwon Jun – PSM Makassar – 2011
- Bok Jun-Hee – Bali Devata – 2011
- Kim Kang Hyun – Persibo Bojonegoro – 2011
- Ku Kyung-Hyun – Tangerang Wolves – 2011
- Kim Sang-Duk – Bandung F.C. – 2011
- Han Sang-Min – Persema Malang – 2011
- Ryung Tae-Pyo – Real Mataram – 2011

== Syria ==
- Muhammad Albicho – Persibo Bojonegoro – 2011
- Marwan Sayedeh – PSM Makassar – 2011

== Tahiti ==
- Alvin Tehau – Atjeh United – 2011

== Tunisia ==
- Amine Kamoun – Bintang Medan – 2011
