= Liga Primer Indonesia =

- Organising body: Konsorsium Liga Primer Indonesia; PT Liga Primer Indonesia
- Founded: 2010
- Folded: 2011
- Country: Indonesia
- Number of clubs: 19
- Level on pyramid: 1
- Relegation to: none
- Domestic cup: none
- International cup: none
- Broadcaster(s): Indosiar, Metro TV, Trans7, Trans TV (former)
- Website: ligaprimerindonesia.co.id

Liga Primer Indonesia
- Season: 2011
- Champions: none
- Matches: 171
- Goals: 488 (2.85 per match)
- Top goalscorer: Juan Manuel Cortes (13); Fernando Gaston Soler (13); Laakkad Abdelhadi (13)
- Biggest home win: Bogor Raya 5–0 Bandung F.C. (5 March 2011)
- Biggest away win: Minangkabau 0–5 Persebaya 1927 (5 February 2011)
- Highest scoring: Solo FC 7–3 Manado United (10 April 2011)

Liga Primer Indonesia (LPI, sometimes translated to English as Indonesian Premier League) was an Indonesian independent football league held in 2011. It was managed by Konsorsium Liga Premier Indonesia and PT Liga Primer Indonesia and was not recognized (initially) by the PSSI. Nineteen clubs took part in its inaugural and only season which was running from January to May 2011. The first kick-off was held on 8 January 2011 in Manahan Stadium, Solo, Central Java. Despite its original full-season schedule, the league was then stopped during the half-season break when Persebaya 1927 was currently leading the table.

== History ==
On 17 September 2010, twenty Indonesian football clubs together with the Indonesian National Football Reform Movement (GRSNI) issued a declaration in Jenggala Graha, Jakarta. It was led by Arifin Panigoro, a local businessman. The declaration was related to the concerns of the declining state of the national football.

The clubs then took a joint initiative to establish and declare Liga Primer Indonesia (LPI) in Semarang on 24 October 2010, with 17 clubs (out of 20) expressing their will to participate.

The spirit of each clubs in building Liga Primer Indonesia were designed as a commitment to improve the standard of football, both organizationally and financially. The league views that the system of capital assistance and revenue sharing system in Liga Primer Indonesia could make clubs "financially independent and professional in management."

To achieve independence, Liga Primer Indonesia provided assistance forms of the initial capital for each participating club. With this assistance, the clubs are expected to run without dependent from local government budget (APBD). The initial capital will vary between clubs according to the audit results that have been held. Additionally, the LPI embraces the principle of division of revenues in a transparent and accountable to the club participants. According to agreement with the club, LPI revenue sharing would be based on two schemes, namely schemes to league revenues (e.g.: sponsor the league, broadcasting rights, etc.) and schemes for income matches (e.g.: local sponsorship, broadcasting rights, tickets, etc.).

The inaugural (and only) season started on 8 January 2011. Before, LPI hosted a pre-season competition in Bogor, Solo and Semarang.

On 11 April 2011, the FIFA Normalisation Committee charged with running Indonesian football officially recognized Liga Primer Indonesia, allowing the competition and all players involved to be officially recognized by PSSI as well as FIFA and eligible to play in the national team. The league was officially disbanded in August 2011, with last match being held in May; all clubs in it merged with those already in Indonesian Premier League, which used the same acronym in both Indonesian and English, although most of the clubs created specifically for the league disbanded almost immediately.

== Teams ==
The only LPI season featured 19 teams, four of the 19 were defected from PSSI sanctioned league of whom three (PSM Makassar, Persema Malang and Persibo Bojonegoro) defected from the top tier Indonesia Super League, and Persebaya from the second tier Liga Indonesia Premier Division.

=== Stadium and locations ===
Locations of the teams in the 2011 Liga Primer Indonesia

Club	City	Province	Stadium	Capacity	2009–10 season
Aceh United	Banda Aceh	Aceh	Harapan Bangsa	40,000	
Bali Devata	Gianyar; Denpasar	Bali	I Wayan Dipta; Ngurah Rai	25,000; 25,000	
Bandung	Bandung	West Java	Siliwangi	25,000	
Batavia Union	North Jakarta; Jakarta; Bekasi	DKI Jakarta; West Java	Tugu; Sumantri Brojonegoro; Patriot	20,000; 5,000; 10,000	
Bintang Medan	Medan	North Sumatra	Teladan	20,000	
Bogor Raya	Bogor Regency; Bogor	West Java	Persikabo; Pajajaran	15,000; 12,000	
Cendrawasih Papua	Jayapura	Papua	Mandala	30,000	
Jakarta FC 1928	Jakarta; Bogor Regency	DKI Jakarta; West Java	Lebak Bulus; Persikabo	12,500; 15,000	
Manado United	Manado	North Sulawesi	Klabat	10,000	
Medan Chiefs	Deli Serdang	North Sumatra	Baharuddin Siregar	15,000	
Minangkabau	Padang	West Sumatra	Haji Agus Salim	28,000	
Persebaya 1927	Surabaya	East Java	Gelora 10 November	30,000	17th place in 2009–10 Super League
Persema Malang	Malang	East Java	Gajayana	30,000	10th in 2009–10 Super League
Persibo Bojonegoro	Bojonegoro	East Java	Letjen Haji Sudirman	15,000	2009–10 Premier Division champions
PSM Makassar	Makassar	South Sulawesi	Mattoangin	30,000	13th in 2009–10 Super League
Real Mataram	Sleman; Yogyakarta	Yogyakarta	Maguwoharjo; Mandala Krida	30,000; 25,000	
Semarang United	Semarang	Central Java	Jatidiri	25,000	
Solo	Solo	Central Java	Manahan	24,000	
Tangerang Wolves	Tangerang	Banten	Benteng	25,000	

=== Personnel and kits ===
Note: Flags indicate national team as has been defined under FIFA eligibility rules. Players and Managers may hold more than one non-FIFA nationality.

Team	Manager	Captain	Kitmaker	Shirt sponsor
Aceh United	(France) Lionel Charbonnier	(Cameroon) Pierre Njanka		
Bali Devata	(Netherlands) Willy Scheepers	(Netherlands) Pascal Heije	Uno	
Bandung	(Indonesia) Budiman	(Indonesia) Nur'alim	Uno	
Batavia Union	(Spain) Roberto Bianchi	(Chile) Javier Rocha	Uno	
Bintang Medan	(Germany) Michael Feichtenbeiner	(Australia) Steve Pantelidis	Uno	
Bogor Raya	(Indonesia) Jhon Arwandi	(Indonesia) Masferi Kasim	Mitre	
Cendrawasih Papua	(Germany) Uwe Erkenbrecher	(Indonesia) Yance Yowey	Uno	
Jakarta FC 1928	(Indonesia) Bambang Nurdiansyah	(Argentina) Emanuel de Porras	Nike	
Manado United	(Indonesia) M. Zein Alhadad	(Cameroon) Felix Yetna	Joma	
Medan Chiefs	(Germany) Jörg Steinebrunner	(Indonesia) Aun Carbiny	Reebok	
Minangkabau	(Portugal) Divaldo Alves	(Indonesia) Jumaidi Rais	Specs	
Persebaya 1927	(Indonesia) Aji Santoso	(Indonesia) Erol Iba	Joma	
Persema Malang	(Germany) Timo Scheunemann	(Indonesia) Bima Sakti	Reebok	
Persibo Bojonegoro	(Indonesia) Sartono Anwar	(Indonesia) Aries Tuansyah	Lotto	
PSM Makassar	(Netherlands) Wim Rijsbergen	(Indonesia) Supriyono	Vilour	Bosowa Semen
Real Mataram	(Argentina) José Basualdo	(Indonesia) Supriyanto	Uno	
Semarang United	(Indonesia) Edy Paryono	(Brazil) Amarildo Luis de Souza	Nike	Bank Jateng
Solo	(Serbia) Branko Babić	(Indonesia) Edy Subagio	Uno	
Tangerang Wolves	(Brazil) Paulo Camargo	(Brazil) Luis Feitoza	Mitre	

=== Managerial changes ===
Team	Outgoing manager	Manner of departure	Date of vacancy	Table	Incoming manager	Date of appointment
Bandung	(Indonesia) Nandar Iskandar	Sacked	5 March 2011	19th	Budiman	TBD

== Foreign players ==
In this league each club is allowed to sign five foreign players. The five foreign players can come from any confederation. Foreign players who have Indonesian descent or parents were considered as local players.

Club	Visa 1	Visa 2	Visa 3	Visa 4	Visa 5	Non-Visa Foreign
Aceh United	(Cameroon) Pierre Njanka	(Cameroon) Alain N'Kong	(South Korea) Park Dae-Sik	(South Korea) Yum Dong-Jin	(French Polynesia) Alvin Tehau	
Bali Devata	(Montenegro) Ilija Spasojevic	(Netherlands) Pascal Heije	(Argentina) Guillermo Imhoff	(Iran) Ali Parhizi	(South Korea) Bok Jun-Hee	(Netherlands) (Indonesia) Raphael Maitimo
Bandung	(England) Lee Hendrie	(Liberia) Perry N'Somah	(Nigeria) Michael Onwatuegwu	(Iran) Javad Moradi	(South Korea) Kim Sang-Duk	
Batavia Union	(Argentina) Juan Manuel Cortés	(Argentina) Leandro Scornainchi	(Chile) Javier Rocha	(South Korea) Na Byung-Yul	(South Korea) Kim Jong-Kyung	
Bintang Medan	(Romania) Cosmin Vancea	(Portugal) Guti Ribeiro	(Tunisia) Amine Kamoun	(Australia) Steve Pantelidis	(South Korea) Ahn Hyo-Yeon	(Netherlands) (Indonesia) Gaston Salasiwa
Bogor Raya	(Argentina) Oscar Alegre	(Argentina) Diego Bogado	(Argentina) Luciano Rimoldi	(Australia) Andrija Jukic	(Australia) Billy Quinncroft	
Cendrawasih Papua	(Latvia) Deniss Romanovs	(Germany) Patrick Ghigani	(Brazil) Márcio Bambu	(Australia) Fred Agius	(Australia) Daniel Wilkinson	
Jakarta FC 1928	(Argentina) Emanuel de Porras	(Argentina) Gustavo Ortiz	(Argentina) Leonardo Moyano			
Manado United	(Brazil) Amaral	(Brazil) Jardel Santana	(Ivory Coast) Eugene Dadi	(Cameroon) Felix Yetna	(Iran) Ali Hossein Shiri	
Medan Chiefs	(France) Kevin Yann	(Chile) Luis Eduardo Hicks	(Morocco) Laakkad Abdelhadi	(Singapore) Baihakki Khaizan	(Singapore) Shahril Ishak	(Netherlands) (Indonesia) Fred Pasaribu (Netherlands) (Indonesia) Bryan Bono Brard (Netherlands) (Indonesia) Dane Dwight Brard
Minangkabau	(Brazil) Juninho	(Angola) David Kuagica	(Angola) Norberto Mulenessa Maurito	(Australia) Mario Karlovic	(Australia) Milan Susak	
Persebaya 1927	(North Macedonia) Michael Cvetkovski	(Brazil) Otávio Dutra	(Liberia) John Tarkpor	(Australia) Andrew Barisic		
Persema	(Luxembourg) Benoît Lang	(Cameroon) Seme Pierre Pattrick	(Cameroon) Guy Mamoun	(Australia) Robert Gaspar	(South Korea) Han Sang-Min	
Persibo	(Brazil) Carlos Eduardo Bizarro	(Brazil) Wallacer de Andrade Medeiros	(Iran) Amir Amadeh	(Syria) Muhammad Albicho	(South Korea) Kim Kang-Hyun	
PSM	(Netherlands) Richard Knopper	(Australia) Srecko Mitrovic	(Australia) Goran Subara	(Syria) Marwan Sayedeh	(South Korea) Kwon Jun	
Real Mataram	(Argentina) Fernando Gaston Soler	(Argentina) Juan Dario Batalla	(Chile) Christian Febre	(South Korea) Ryung Tae-Pyo		
Semarang United	(Italy) Raffaele Simone Quintieri	(Brazil) Amarildo Luís de Souza	(Angola) Amâncio Fortes	(Australia) Josh Maguire		
Solo	(Russia) Sergei Litvinov	(Serbia) Stevan Racic	(Serbia) Zarko Lazetic	(Australia) Aleks Vrteski	(Australia) David Micevski	
Tangerang Wolves	(Brazil) Wallace Rodrigues da Silva	(Brazil) Luis Feitoza	(Brazil) Victor Hugo	(South Korea) Ku Kyung-Hyun	(South Korea) Park Chan-Yong	(Netherlands) (Indonesia) Regilio Jacobs (Netherlands) (Indonesia) Jordy de Kat

== Sponsors ==
- Bank Saudara
- Indosiar
- Coca-Cola
- Microsoft

== League table ==
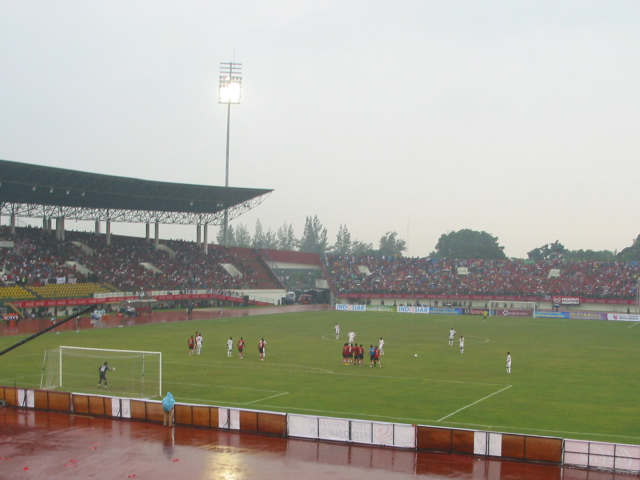
First match on 2011 season played at Manahan Stadium, Solo

Pos	Team	Pld	W	D	L	GF	GA	GD	Pts
1	Persebaya 1927	18	12	4	2	42	13	+29	40
2	Persema Malang	18	12	4	2	35	17	+18	40
3	PSM	18	10	4	4	36	18	+18	34
4	Jakarta FC 1928	18	9	5	4	33	20	+13	32
5	Medan Chiefs	18	9	5	4	26	20	+6	32
6	Batavia Union	18	8	7	3	32	23	+9	31
7	Bali Devata	18	8	5	5	22	17	+5	29
8	Persibo Bojonegoro	18	8	5	5	25	22	+3	29
9	Semarang United	18	9	1	8	18	21	−3	28
10	Minangkabau	18	7	6	5	21	20	+1	27
11	Aceh United	18	8	2	8	23	24	−1	26
12	Bintang Medan	18	6	4	8	29	30	−1	22
13	Bogor Raya	18	6	3	9	22	24	−2	21
14	Solo	18	4	4	10	19	29	−10	16
15	Bandung	18	4	4	10	22	33	−11	16
16	Real Mataram	18	4	4	10	27	41	−14	16
17	Manado United	18	3	6	9	19	36	−17	15
18	Tangerang Wolves	18	2	5	11	19	36	−17	11
19	Cendrawasih Papua	18	1	4	13	18	44	−26	7

Updated to match(es) played on 31 March 2011. Source: goal.com
Rules for classification: 1) points; 2) goal difference; 3) number of goals scored.

== Results ==
Home \ Away	ACH	BDV	BFC	BTV	BRY	CEN	JFC	MDU	MDB	MDC	MNK	SBY	PSMA	PSBO	PSM	RLM	SMU	SFC	TWV
Aceh United			2–0		1–0	4–1				0–1			1–0	1–1		2–1	2–0		
Bali Devata	2–0			0–1		3–1	1–1	1–0			1–1	2–1			2–3			1–0	2–2
Bandung		0–1							2–2	1–1	1–0		0–1	0–1	1–1	5–3	3–1		1–2
Batavia Union	2–0		3–2		2–1	3–2	1–1	4–1				0–0			1–1			1–2	
Bogor Raya		2–0	5–0						0–4	2–4	0–0		1–2	1–1	2–0	3–0	2–1		
Cendrawasih Papua			1–2		1–2				3–2	0–0			1–5	1–2		2–4	1–2		
Jakarta FC 1928	3–1		3–1		3–0	2–2		3–0					0–1	2–1			0–1		
Manado United	2–2		1–1		1–0	3–0				1–2			0–0	2–1			0–2		
Bintang Medan	1–0	2–2		1–2			0–1	3–0			1–0	1–1						2–1	3–1
Medan Chiefs		0–2		2–2					1–1		2–0	0–0				3–0		2–1	2–0
Minangkabau	1–0			1–1		3–1	2–2	4–1				0–5			1–0			1–0	3–1
Persebaya 1927	4–1		2–1		2–0	0–0	3–2	3–1					4–0	4–0					
Persema Malang		1–0		1–1					4–1	2–1	1–1			1–1	2–1	5–2	2–0		2–1
Persibo Bojonegoro		1–1		0–2					2–1	5–1	0–0					2–1	3–1	2–1	2–0
PSM Makassar	3–0					5–1	1–4	0–0	4–1	2–1		4–0		2–0		1–1	2–0		
Real Mataram		0–1		3–2			1–1	2–2	3–1		1–2	2–6						1–1	2–1
Semarang United		1–0		2–1					3–2	0–1	2–1	0–1				1–0		0–0	1–0
Solo	0–3		3–1		1–0	0–0	0–1	7–3				0–2	1–5		1–4				
Tangerang Wolves	2–4			3–3	1–1	2–0	2–3	1–1				0–4			0–2			0–0	

Updated to match(es) played on 6 March 2011. Source: goal.com
Legend: Blue = home team win; Yellow = draw; Red = away team win.

== Top scorers ==
Rank	Scorer	Club	Goals
1	(Argentina) Juan Manuel Cortes	Batavia Union	13
1	(Argentina) Fernando Gaston Soler	Real Mataram	13
1	(Morocco) Laakkad Abdelhadi	Medan Chiefs	13
4	(Argentina) Emanuel de Porras	Jakarta FC 1928	10
4	(Indonesia) Samsul Arif	Persibo Bojonegoro	10
4	(Indonesia) Irfan Bachdim	Persema Malang	10
4	(Romania) Cosmin Vancea	Bintang Medan	10
4	(Syria) Marwan Sayedeh	PSM	10
9	(Liberia) Perry N'Somah	Bandung	9
10	(Brazil) Wallace Rodrigues Da Silva	Tangerang Wolves	8
10	(Indonesia) M. Rahmat	PSM	8
10	(Indonesia) Andi Oddang	PSM	8
10	(Australia) Andrew Barisic	Persebaya 1927	8
10	(Montenegro) Ilija Spasojević	Bali Devata	8
10	(Australia) Fred Agius	Cendrawasih Papua	8
16	(Brazil) Jardel Santana	Manado United	7
16	(Indonesia) Sansan Fauzi Husaeni	Jakarta	7

== See also ==
- Liga Primer Indonesia Pre-season Tournament
- Liga Primer Indonesia Central Java Governor Cup
- Indonesian football league system
- Indonesia Super League
- Piala Indonesia
