= Liga Primer Indonesia Pre-season Tournament =

2010 Liga Primer Indonesia Pre-season Tournament
Tournament details
- Host country: Indonesia
- Dates: 29 November – 11 December
- Teams: 13 (from 1 confederation)
- Venues: 3 (in 3 host cities)

Final positions
- Champions: (Indonesia) Batavia Union (Group A) (1st title) (Indonesia) Real Mataram (Group B) (1st title) (Indonesia) Persebaya 1927 (Group C) (1st title)
- Runners-up: (Indonesia) Jakarta 1928 (Group A) (Indonesia) Tangerang Wolves (Group B) (Indonesia) Bandung (Group C)
- Third place: (Indonesia) Bogor Raya (Group A) (Indonesia) Solo (Group B) (Indonesia) Semarang United (Group C)
- Fourth place: (Indonesia) Manado United (Group A) (Indonesia) Persema (Group B) (Indonesia) Bali Devata (Group C)

Tournament statistics
- Matches played: 13
- Goals scored: 34 (2.62 per match)
- Top scorer(s): Group A : Juan Manuel Cortez (2 goal); Group B : Chrestian Gonzales & Slamet Hariyadi (2 goal); Group C : Perry N Somah (3 goal)

The Liga Primer Indonesia Pre-season Tournament (Indonesian: Turnamen Pra-musim Liga Primer Indonesia) was a national football tournament held by the PT Liga Primer Indonesia, as pre-season tournament before Liga Primer Indonesia season. The tournament was held in 29 November - 11 December 2010. Bogor, the home city of Bogor Raya; Solo, the home base of Solo; and Semarang, the home base of Semarang United hosted the event.

At the beginning of this tournament would be followed by foreign teams. However, the plan was scrapped because of the limited time to bring foreign teams and so the tournament was only followed by Liga Primer Indonesia participating clubs.

== Format ==
The competition was followed by 13 Liga Primer Indonesia participating clubs which were divided into 3 groups each consisting of two groups of four clubs and a group of five clubs. Each club only competed twice in the tournament.

== Participating clubs ==
13 clubs took part in this tournament.

Group A

- Bogor Raya (host)
- Batavia Union
- Jakarta 1928
- Manado United

Group B

- Solo (host)
- Tangerang United
- Real Mataram
- Medan Chiefs
- Persema

Group C

- Semarang United (host)
- Persebaya 1927
- Bali Devata
- Bandung

== Table & results ==
Key to colours in group tables
Top placed teams is Champions

=== Group A ===
- All matches to be played in Persikabo Stadium, Bogor.
- All times are Western Indonesian Time (WIB) – UTC+7.

Rank	Team	Pld	W	D	L	GF	GA	GD	Pts
1	Batavia Union	2	2	0	0	5	3	+2	6
2	Jakarta 1928 F.C.	2	1	0	1	4	2	+2	3
3	Bogor Raya F.C.	2	0	1	1	3	4	−1	1
4	Manado United	2	0	1	1	1	4	−3	1

29 November 2010
15:30 WIB

Bogor Raya F.C. (Indonesia)	2 – 3	(Indonesia) Batavia Union
Odri 30'; Iswardi 5'	Report	5' Roca; 40' Juan; 66' Tantan

Persikabo Stadium, Bogor Regency, Indonesia
6 December 2010
15:30 WIB

Batavia Union (Indonesia)	2 – 1	(Indonesia) Jakarta 1928 F.C.
Juan 33' (pen.); Iskandar 45'	Report	(yellow card) 32' Ferdi; 84' Ortiz

Persikabo Stadium, Bogor Regency, Indonesia
Attendance: 1,500
8 December 2010
15:30 WIB

Manado United (Indonesia)	0 – 3	(Indonesia) Jakarta 1928 F.C.
	Report	7' Bayu; 37' Leonardo; 75' Andre

Persikabo Stadium, Bogor Regency, Indonesia
11 December 2010
15:30 WIB

Bogor Raya F.C. (Indonesia)	1 – 1	(Indonesia) Manado United
Masferi 79' (pen.)	Report	7' Radji

Persikabo Stadium, Bogor Regency, Indonesia

=== Group B ===
- All matches to be played in Manahan Stadium, Solo.
- All times are Western Indonesian Time (WIB) – UTC+7.

Rank	Team	Pld	W	D	L	GF	GA	GD	Pts
1	Real Mataram	2	2	0	0	4	2	+2	6
2	Tangerang United	2	1	0	1	3	2	+1	3
3	Solo F.C.	2	0	2	0	2	2	0	2
4	Persema F.C.	2	0	1	1	3	4	−1	1
5	Medan Chiefs	2	0	1	1	0	2	−2	1

2 December 2010
15:30 WIB

Tangerang United (Indonesia)	1 – 2	(Indonesia) Real Mataram
Gonzales 59'	Report	15' Supriyanto; 38' Bisri

Manahan Stadium, Solo, Central Java, Indonesia
Referee: (Indonesia) Winarko Bahtiar
2 December 2010
19:30 WIB

Solo F.C. (Indonesia)	0 – 0	(Indonesia) Medan Chiefs
	Report

Manahan Stadium, Solo, Central Java, Indonesia
4 December 2010
15:30 WIB

Tangerang United (Indonesia)	2 – 0	(Indonesia) Medan Chiefs
M. Azis 4'; Gonzales 26'	Report

Manahan Stadium, Solo, Central Java, Indonesia
Referee: (Indonesia) Winarno Bachtiar (Mojokerto)
4 December 2010
19:30 WIB

Real Mataram (Indonesia)	2 – 1	(Indonesia) Persema F.C.
Nandri (red card) 19'; Zaenal 21'; Reza 45+1'	Report	13' Slamet; (red card) 41' Muchtar

Manahan Stadium, Solo, Central Java, Indonesia
6 December 2010
15:30 WIB

Persema F.C. (Indonesia)	2 – 2	(Indonesia) Solo F.C.
Bagus 45+1'; Slamet 68'	Report	19' Villaba; 88' Figuera

Manahan Stadium, Solo, Central Java, Indonesia

=== Group C ===
- All matches to be played in Jatidiri Stadium, Semarang.
- All times are Western Indonesian Time (WIB) – UTC+7.

Team	Pld	W	D	L	GF	GA	GD	Pts
Persebaya PL	2	2	0	0	4	0	+4	6
Bandung F.C.	2	2	0	0	4	1	+3	6
Semarang United	2	0	0	2	1	3	−2	0
BDU F.C.	2	0	0	2	0	5	−5	0

2 December 2010
15:30 WIB

Semarang United (Indonesia)	0 – 1	(Indonesia) Persebaya PL
	Report	77' Mico

Jatidiri Stadium, Semarang, Indonesia
2 December 2010
19:30 WIB

Bandung F.C. (Indonesia)	2 – 0	(Indonesia) BDU F.C.
Perry 24', 61'	Report

Jatidiri Stadium, Semarang, Indonesia
Referee: Giovani
4 December 2010
15:30 WIB

Persebaya PL (Indonesia)	3 – 0	(Indonesia) BDU F.C.
Made 17'; Andik 34', 83'	Report

Jatidiri Stadium, Semarang, Indonesia
Referee: (Indonesia) Viator Ambarita
4 December 2010
19:30 WIB

Semarang United (Indonesia)	1 – 2	(Indonesia) Bandung F.C.
Vithor 32'	Report	31' Rinto; 65' Perry; (yellow card) Ichwan; (yellow card) Kingsley; (red card) 87' Perry

Jatidiri Stadium, Semarang, Indonesia
Referee: Geovani
