= 2011–12 Persebaya 1927 season =

Persebaya 1927
2011-12 season
- President: Saleh Ismail Mukadar
- Headcoach: Divaldo Alves
- Stadium: Gelora Bung Tomo Stadium, Surabaya
- Indonesian Premier League: 2nd
- Top goalscorer: Fernando Soler (9)
- Biggest win: Persebaya 1927 3-0 PSMS Medan (IPL)
- Biggest defeat: PSM Makassar 2-0 Persebaya 1927

The 2011–12 season is the first season for Persebaya 1927 in the Indonesian Premier League (IPL) as an official league under the authority of PSSI. Persebaya 1927 previously becoming the mid-season champion in the breakaway league Liga Primer Indonesia (LPI).

== Squad information ==
=== First team squad ===
No.	Name	Nat.	Signed in	Date of birth (age)	Signed from
Goalkeepers
30	Endra Prasetya	(Indonesia)	2008	1 May 1981 (age 45)	(Indonesia) Persema Malang
22	Dedi Iman	(Indonesia)	2011	22 July 1985 (age 40)	(Indonesia) Persema Malang
1	Dimas Galih Pratama	(Indonesia)	2011	23 November 1992 (age 33)	(Indonesia) The Academy
Defenders
16	Jefri Prasetyo	(Indonesia)	2011	1 May 1985 (age 41)	(Indonesia)
6	Nurmufid Fastabiqul Khoirot	(Indonesia)	2011	25 April 1991 (age 35)	(Indonesia) The Academy
20	Muhammad Aulia Ardli	(Indonesia)	2011	22 November 1990 (age 35)	(Indonesia) The Academy
2	Mat Halil	(Indonesia)	1999	3 July 1979 (age 46)	(Indonesia) The Academy
3	Erol Iba	(Indonesia)	2011	6 August 1979 (age 46)	(Indonesia) Persipura Jayapura
24	Yusuf Hamzah	(Indonesia)	2011	10 February 1985 (age 41)	(Indonesia)
5	Otavio Dutra	(Brazil)	2011	22 November 1983 (age 42)	(Brazil) Macaé Esporte Futebol Clube
15	Rivelino Ardiles	(Indonesia)	2011		(Indonesia)
34	Wirya Kumandra	(Indonesia)	2011	24 March 1989 (age 37)	(Indonesia) Jakarta F.C.
25	Edy Gunawan	(Indonesia)	2011	25 September 1985 (age 40)	(Indonesia) Persiba Balikpapan
28	Khomad Suharto	(Indonesia)	2011	16 March 1985 (age 41)	(Indonesia) Persela Lamongan
4	Amaral	(Brazil)	2011	28 February 1973 (age 53)	(Indonesia) Manado United
	Saddam Hi Tenang	(Indonesia)	2011	2 February 1994 (age 32)	(Indonesia) Aceh United
Midfielders
18	Rian Wahyu	(Indonesia)	2011	15 April 1991 (age 35)	(Indonesia) The Academy
8	Muhammad Taufiq	(Indonesia)	2008	29 November 1986 (age 39)	(Indonesia) PSIM Yogyakarta
12	Rendi Irwan	(Indonesia)	2011	26 April 1987 (age 39)	(Indonesia) Mitra Kukar
21	Jusmadi	(Indonesia)	2011	19 October 1983 (age 42)	(Indonesia) Pelita Jaya
29	Mario Karlovic	(Australia)	2011	29 May 1984 (age 41)	(Indonesia) Minangkabau F.C.
31	Feri Ariawan	(Indonesia)	2011	16 May 1986 (age 40)	(Indonesia) Persela Lamongan
31	Walter Brizuela	(Argentina)	2012	16 February 1981 (age 45)	(Indonesia) Deltras
Forwards
10	Fernando Soler	(Argentina)	2012	24 February 1978 (age 48)	(Indonesia) Persis Solo
7	Andik Vermansah	(Indonesia)	2008	23 November 1991 (age 34)	(Indonesia) The Academy
27	Andrew Barisic	(Australia)	2011	22 March 1986 (age 40)	(Australia) Gold Coast United
11	Miko Ardiyanto	(Indonesia)	2011	25 May 1991 (age 34)	(Indonesia) The Academy
	Sahlan Shodiq	(Indonesia)	2011		(Uruguay) Deportivo Indonesia

== Competitions ==
=== League table ===
Pos	Team	Pld	W	D	L	GF	GA	GD	Pts	Qualification or relegation
1	Semen Padang (C)	22	13	7	2	46	21	+25	46	2013 AFC Cup Group stage
2	Persebaya 1927	22	12	2	8	31	23	+8	38	
3	Arema Indonesia	22	11	4	7	42	26	+16	37	
4	Persibo Bojonegoro	22	11	3	8	31	24	+7	36	2013 AFC Cup Group stage (Note: Persibo Bojonegoro were chosen by PSSI to join the Group stage of the 2013 AFC Cup as the winner of 2012 Piala Indonesia.)
5	Persiba Bantul	22	10	5	7	27	23	+4	35	

Updated to match(es) played on 17 July 2012. Source: IPL
Rules for classification: 1) points; 2) goal difference; 3) number of goals scored.
(C) Champions
