= 2011 Persebaya 1927 season =

Persebaya 1927
2011 season
- Owner: PT. Persebaya Indonesia
- President: Saleh Ismail Mukadar
- Headcoach: Aji Santoso
- Stadium: Gelora 10 November Stadium, Surabaya
- Liga Primer Indonesia: 1st (season unfinished)
- Top goalscorer: Andrew Barisic (8)
- Biggest win: Minangkabau F.C. 0-5 Persebaya 1927
- Biggest defeat: PSM Makassar 4-0 Persebaya 1927

The 2011 season was the first season for Persebaya Surabaya to play in the breakaway league and not take part in official competitions from PSSI. It was in this season that Persebaya Surabaya decided to change its name to Persebaya 1927 in order to obtain permission to compete from security forces. In addition, the change in the club's official name was due to Persebaya Surabaya's schism, the team was split into two, Persebaya 1927 and Persebaya Surabaya DU. Persebaya 1927 is the same entity as Persebaya Surabaya which was relegated from the 2009-10 ISL. Meanwhile, Persebaya Surabaya DU is a new entity formed on 22 October 2010. However, they are the ones whose is recognized by PSSI. Then the name Persebaya Surabaya becoming the right of Persebaya Surabaya DU, because had previously received security permission from the police earlier. Persebaya 1927 based on existing legality, they are the ones who have more right to use the name Persebaya Surabaya. However, they were forced to change the name by the police.

== Squad information ==
=== First team squad ===
| No. | Name | Nat. | Signed in | Date of birth (age) | Signed from |
Goalkeepers
| 30 | Endra Prasetya | (Indonesia) | 2008 | 1 May 1981 (age 45) | (Indonesia) Persema Malang |
| 1 | Dimas Galih Pratama | (Indonesia) | 2011 | 23 November 1992 (age 33) | (Indonesia) The Academy |
| 20 | Afriyanto | (Indonesia) | 2011 | | (Indonesia) Sriwijaya F.C. |
Defenders
| 16 | Michael Cvetkovski | (Australia) | 2011 | 21 November 1987 (age 38) | (North Macedonia) FK Pelister |
| 86 | Yohan Ibo | (Indonesia) | 2011 | 19 September 1985 (age 40) | (Indonesia) Pelita Jaya |
| 6 | Nurmufid Fastabiqul Khoirot | (Indonesia) | 2011 | 25 April 1991 (age 35) | (Indonesia) The Academy |
| 21 | Muhammad Aulia Ardli | (Indonesia) | 2011 | 22 November 1990 (age 35) | (Indonesia) The Academy |
| 2 | Mat Halil | (Indonesia) | 1999 | 3 July 1979 (age 46) | (Indonesia) The Academy |
| 3 | Erol Iba | (Indonesia) | 2011 | 6 August 1979 (age 46) | (Indonesia) Persipura Jayapura |
| 25 | Khusnul Yuli | (Indonesia) | 2011 | 13 July 1978 (age 47) | (Indonesia) Persik Kediri |
| 5 | Otavio Dutra | (Brazil) | 2011 | 22 November 1983 (age 42) | (Brazil) Macaé Esporte Futebol Clube |
| 45 | Sunaji | (Indonesia) | 2009 | 25 April 1990 (age 36) | (Indonesia) The Academy |
| | Muchsen Alatas | (Indonesia) | 2011 | | (Indonesia) The Academy |
Midfielders
| 9 | Rian Wahyu | (Indonesia) | 2011 | 15 April 1991 (age 35) | (Indonesia) The Academy |
| 8 | Muhammad Taufiq | (Indonesia) | 2008 | 29 November 1986 (age 39) | (Indonesia) PSIM Yogyakarta |
| 12 | Rendi Irwan | (Indonesia) | 2011 | 26 April 1987 (age 39) | (Indonesia) Mitra Kukar |
| 14 | Jusmadi | (Indonesia) | 2011 | 19 October 1983 (age 42) | (Indonesia) Pelita Jaya |
| 17 | Arif Ariyanto | (Indonesia) | 2005 | 17 June 1985 (age 40) | (Indonesia) The Academy |
| 13 | Lucky Wahyu | (Indonesia) | 2007 | 1 April 1990 (age 36) | (Indonesia) The Academy |
| 7 | John Tarkpor | (Liberia) | 2009 | 16 October 1986 (age 39) | (Indonesia) Persitara Jakarta Utara |
Forwards
| 18 | I Made Wirahadi | (Indonesia) | 2012 | 24 April 1983 (age 43) | (Indonesia) Pelita Jaya |
| 10 | Andik Vermansah | (Indonesia) | 2008 | 23 November 1991 (age 34) | (Indonesia) The Academy |
| 27 | Andrew Barisic | (Australia) | 2011 | 22 March 1986 (age 40) | (Australia) Gold Coast United |
| 11 | Miko Ardiyanto | (Indonesia) | 2011 | 25 May 1991 (age 34) | (Indonesia) The Academy |
| | Sahlan Shodiq | (Indonesia) | 2011 | | (Uruguay) Deportivo Indonesia |
| 15 | Nico Susanto | (Indonesia) | 2011 | 25 May 1985 (age 40) | (Indonesia) Semen Padang F. C. |

== Competitions ==
=== League table ===
| Pos | Team | Pld | W | D | L | GF | GA | GD | Pts |
|---|---|---|---|---|---|---|---|---|---|
| 1 | Persebaya 1927 | 18 | 12 | 4 | 2 | 42 | 13 | +29 | 40 |
| 2 | Persema Malang | 18 | 12 | 4 | 2 | 35 | 17 | +18 | 40 |
| 3 | PSM | 18 | 10 | 4 | 4 | 36 | 18 | +18 | 34 |
| 4 | Jakarta FC 1928 | 18 | 9 | 5 | 4 | 33 | 20 | +13 | 32 |
| 5 | Medan Chiefs | 18 | 9 | 5 | 4 | 26 | 20 | +6 | 32 |

Updated to match(es) played on 31 March 2011. Source: goal.com
Rules for classification: 1) points; 2) goal difference; 3) number of goals scored.
