= Manado United 9 =

Indonesian football club

- Full name: Manado United 9
- Nicknames: Paus Biru Raksasa; The Blue Star; North Storm
- Founded: 2010
- Dissolved: 2011
- Ground: Klabat Stadium; Manado, Indonesia
- Capacity: 10.000
- Owner: (Indonesia) Nontje Pangau
- Coach: Sergei Dubrovin
- League: Liga Primer Indonesia
- 2011 LPI: 17
Home colours	Away colours

Manado United 9 or simply known as Manado United is an Indonesian football club based in Manado, North Sulawesi. The team plays in Liga Primer Indonesia.

== Team Officials ==
Role	Name
President	(Indonesia) Ronny Pangemanan
Official	(Indonesia) Jolly Gabriel
Team Manager	(Indonesia) Audy Karamoy
Head Coach	(Moldova) Sergei Dubrovin
Coach Assistant	(Indonesia) M. Alhadad
Official	(Indonesia) Matjon Buang
Goalkeeper Coach	(Indonesia) Edi Rosadi
Team Doctor	(Indonesia) Dr.Arif
Masseur	(Indonesia) Ambran
Driver	(Indonesia) Harley Mait

== The Meaning of Logo ==
Manado United 9 logo (2010–2011)

The ship steering wheel signifies the wheel of a large vessel capable of passing big storms.

Images of water and fish symbolize the city of Manado as a Marine City. Football is expected to help raise the image of Manado as Marine City. Meanwhile, the number nine signifies the 9 united tribes of Minahasa and its 9 districts.

== Current squad ==
Note: Flags indicate national team as defined under FIFA eligibility rules; some limited exceptions apply. Players may hold more than one non-FIFA nationality.

No.	Pos.	Nation	Player
1	GK	IDN	Darma
—	MF	IDN	Cornelis Mambesa
—	MF	IDN	Tommy Harianto
—	MF	IDN	Rosta
6	DF	IRN	Hossein Shiri
14	FW	CIV	Eugène Dadi
7	FW	BRA	Jardel Santana
10	MF	BRA	Amaral (Marquee)
11	MF	IDN	Felix Timbowo
—	DF	IDN	Rolis Sumual
—	FW	IDN	Iskandar
90	DF	IDN	Herry Setiawan

No.	Pos.	Nation	Player
27	DF	CMR	Felix Yetna

== Supporters ==
Manado United's supporters call themselves "The Man" and "Manado United Fans Club (MUFC)".

== Kit Supplier ==
- Joma (since 2011)

== 2011 LPI results ==
Date	Location	Opponent	Score*	Competition
23 January 2011	Bali, Indonesia	Bali Devata F.C.	0–1	LPI
30 January 2011	Manado, Indonesia	Cenderawasih F.C.	3–0	LPI
6 February 2011	Medan, Indonesia	Medan Bintang F.C.	0–3	LPI
13 February 2011	Manado, Indonesia	Atjeh United F.C.	2–2	LPI
19 February 2011	Yogyakarta, Indonesia	Real Mataram	2–2	LPI
26 February 2011	Makassar, Indonesia	PSM Makassar	0–0	LPI
6 March 2011	Manado, Indonesia	Medan Chiefs	1–2	LPI
13 March 2011	Bogor, Indonesia	Jakarta F.C. 1928	0–3	LPI
20 March 2011	Jatidiri Stadium	Semarang United F.C.	0–2	LPI
27 March 2011	Surabaya	Persebaya 1927	1–3	LPI
6 April 2011	Solo	Persibo Bojonegoro	2–1	LPI
10 April 2011	Solo	Solo F.C.	3–7	LPI
17 April 2011	Manado	Persema Malang	0–0	LPI
24 April 2011	Jakarta	Batavia Union	1–4	LPI
1 May 2011	Manado	Bandung F.C.	1–1	LPI
7 May 2011	Tangerang	Tangerang Wolves	1–1	LPI
14 May 2011	Manado	Bogor Raya	1–0	LPI

* Manado United's scores listed first
