= Semarang United F.C. =

Indonesian football club

Semarang United
- Full name: Semarang United Football Club
- Nickname: The Blue Devils
- Founded: 2010
- Dissolved: 2011
- Ground: Jatidiri Stadium
- Capacity: 25.000
- Owner: PT Laskar Diponegoro
- Ketua Umum: Soemarmo
- Manager: Novel Al-Bakrie
- Coach: Edy Paryono
- League: Liga Primer Indonesia

Semarang United Football Club was an Indonesian football club based in Semarang, Central Java. The team plays in Liga Primer Indonesia.

== 2010–2011 squad ==
As of 19 March 2023

Note: Flags indicate national team as defined under FIFA eligibility rules; some limited exceptions apply. Players may hold more than one non-FIFA nationality.

No.	Pos.	Nation	Player
—	GK	IDN	Adi Gesang Saputra
—	GK	IDN	Awaludin
—	GK	IDN	Yoga Wahyu Arif Pratama
—	DF	IDN	Iwan Hari Wahyudi
—	DF	IDN	Tomi Triono
—	DF	IDN	Parjono
—	DF	IDN	Sukamto
—	DF	IDN	Sendik Riskiyanto
—	DF	IDN	Haryadi
—	DF	IDN	Simon Kujiro
—	DF	IDN	Eko Prasetyo Ariyanto

No.	Pos.	Nation	Player
—	MF	IDN	Yudha Nugroho
—	MF	IDN	Agus Santoso
—	MF	IDN	Widoyanto
—	MF	IDN	Ahmad Fais
—	MF	BRA	Amarildo Souza
—	MF	AUS	Josh Maguire
—	MF	ANG	Amâncio Fortes
—	MF	ITA	Raffaele Simone Quintieri
—	FW	IDN	Muhammad Yusuf
—	FW	IDN	Komang Mariawan

== 2011 Liga Primer Indonesia result ==
Date	Venue	Opponent	Result	Scorer	Ref.
15 January 2011	Home	Tangerang Wolves	1–0 (W)	Komang (35)	
23 January 2011	Away	Bogor Raya	2–1 (L)	Maguire (3)	
29 January 2011	Home	Minangkabau	2–1 (W)	Haryadi (62), Maguire (77)	
13 February 2011	Home	Bali Devata	1–0 (W)	Yusuf (87)	
19 February 2011	Away	Cendrawasih Papua	1–2 (W)	Yusuf (19), Komang (84)	
27 February 2011	Home	Bintang Medan	3–2 (W)	Souza (4), Quintieri (24), Souza (64)	
6 March 2011	Away	Aceh United	2–0 (L)		
13 March 2011	Home	Real Mataram	1–0 (W)	Souza (3)	
20 March 2011	Away	Manado United	0–2 (W)	Fortes (58), Komang (81)	
