= Amine Kamoun =

Tunisian footballer

Personal information
- Date of birth: 16 September 1982 (age 44)
- Place of birth: Tunisia
- Height: 1.93 m (6 ft 4 in)
- Position: Centre-back

Senior career*
Years	Team	Apps	(Gls)
2008–2009	AS Marsa		
2009–2010	EGS Gafsa	2	(0)
2010–2011	CS Hammam-Lif	5	(1)
2011–2012	Bintang Medan F.C.	18	(1)
2012–2014	US Monastir	46	(4)
2014–2015	Stade Gabèsien	2	(0)
2015	Stade Sportif Sfaxien		
2015–2017	CS M'saken		
- * Club domestic league appearances and goals

Amine Kamoun (born 16 September 1982) is a Tunisian footballer who plays centre-back.

== Career ==
=== Indonesia ===
On his Bintang Medan debut in 2011, Kamoun asked coach Michael Feichtenbeiner to allow him to be the free-kick taker. At first, Feichtenbeiner express dubiety on the Tunisian's free-kick ability but allowed him to take the shot, scoring the team's only goal in a narrow 1–0 win over Atjeh United.

Despite being seen as Bintang Medan's most consistent defender, he was also known for his susceptibility to injuries and the club sought to find a replacement for him by June 2011.

Received a hamstring injury when his club hosted Jakarta FC 1928 in the Liga Primer Indonesia.

=== Tunisia ===
Under duress from angry fans after a 1–1 stalemate with Grombalia Sports, Kamoun announced his early retirement from football in 2013 but returned shortly.
