= Petar Šegrt =

Croatian football manager (born 1966)

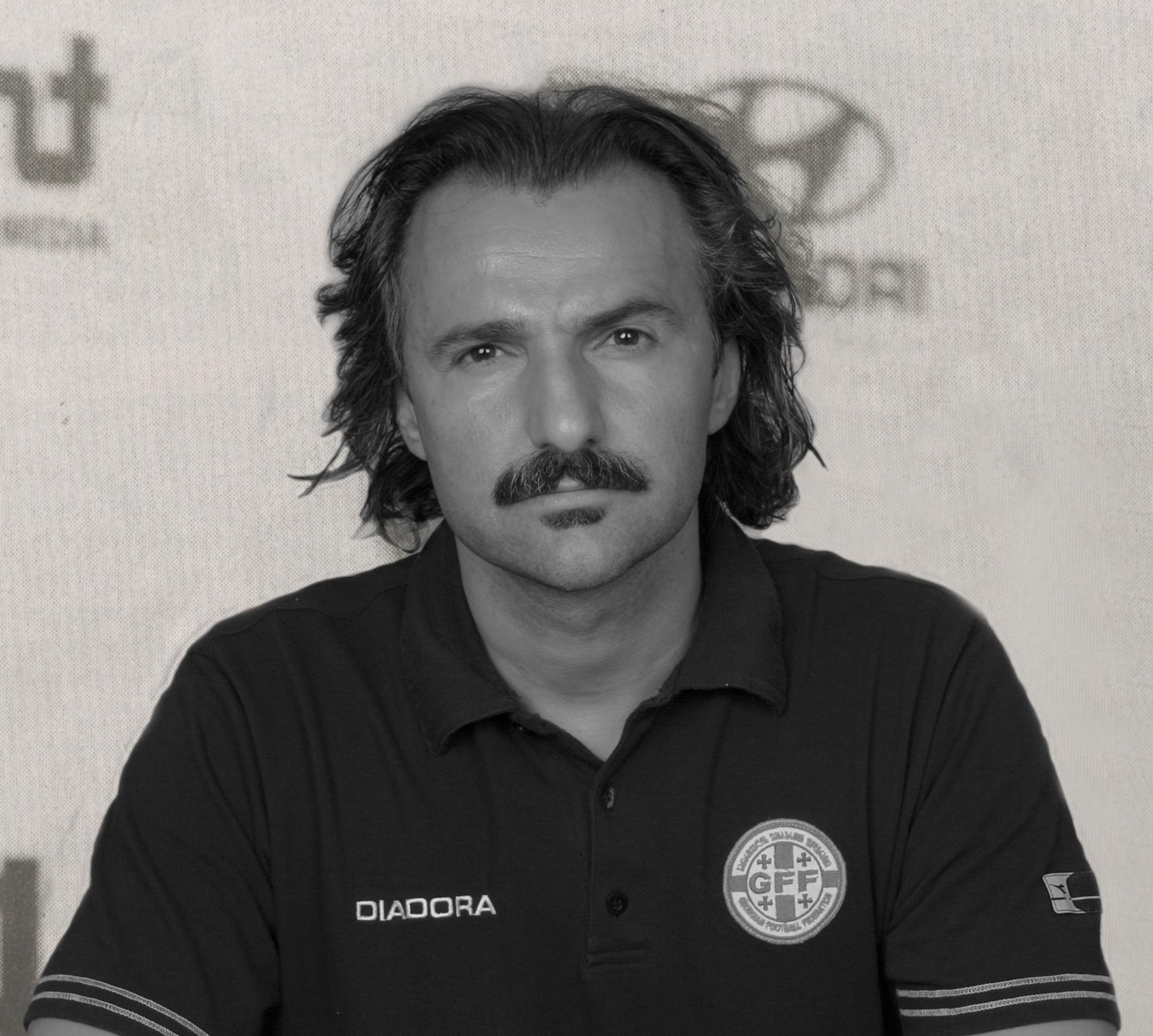
- Šegrt as Georgia manager in 2008

Personal information
- Date of birth: 8 May 1966 (age 60)
- Place of birth: Đurđevac, SR Croatia, SFR Yugoslavia
- Height: 1.85 m (6 ft 1 in)
- Position: Defender

Youth career
- VFR Hirsau
- FC Alzenberg Wimberg
- FV Calw

Senior career*
Years	Team	Apps	(Gls)
1984–1987	FV Calw		
1989–1990	FV Plochingen		
1990–1991	TSV Schwaikheim		
1991–1992	SV Allmersbach		
1992	FC Walldorf		
1993	Waldhof Mannheim Amateure		

Managerial career
- 1983–1987: FV Calw
- 1996–1997: VfL Bochum (assistant)
- 1997–2000: MSV Duisburg (assistant)
- 2000–2001: Waldhof Mannheim (assistant)
- 2001–2003: DSV Leoben
- 2003: SV Ried
- 2004–2006: Wiener Sportklub
- 2006–2008: Georgia U-21
- 2008: Georgia
- 2010–2011: Bali Devata
- 2011–2013: PSM Makassar
- 2014–2015: Zvijezda Gradačac
- 2015–2017: Afghanistan
- 2018–2020: Maldives
- 2022–2024: Tajikistan
Medal record
Men's football
Representing Maldives As Manager
SAFF Championship
Winner	2018 Bangladesh
- * Club domestic league appearances and goals

Petar Šegrt (born 8 May 1966) is a Croatian football coach and former professional player. He was most recently the head coach of the Tajikistan national team.

== Early life ==
Petar Šegrt was born in the town of Đurđevac in SR Croatia in 1966. His parents immigrated to Germany with Šegrt's older brother in the 1970s, leaving Šegrt behind to be raised by his grandmother.

== Playing career ==
A defender, Šegrt started his senior career in 1984 playing for FV Calw. He also played for FV Plochingen, TSV Schwaikheim, SV Allmersbach, FC Walldorf and Waldhof Mannheim Amateure. After his first injury, while he was recovering from the operation, he started as junior coach of FV Calw, while he was only 17 years old. Because of his second knee injury, he had to quit playing in 1993, when he was 27 years old. The same year Šegrt graduated his UEFA 'B' Coaching Licence in Ruit, Germany, and started his coaching career.

== Coaching career ==
After working as an honorary youth coach in the amateur club FV Calw, Šegrt started his professional coaching career and he worked for various clubs in Germany. At Bundesliga clubs VfL Bochum and MSV Duisburg he worked as an U-19 youth coach, as a second team assistant coach and also as part of the first team coaching staff. In 2000, he went back to the club where he once played, SV Waldhof Mannheim in 2. Bundesliga to work as an assistant coach and as head coach of the second team. After he graduated his UEFA Pro Licence in 2001, he started to work as head coach in professional clubs in Austria like DSV Leoben, SV Ried and Wiener Sportklub. In his 14 years of coaching experience, Šegrt was remembered as a coach who developed many young players into players fit for their national teams and earned himself the nickname, "Architect".

=== Georgia national team ===
In 2006, Šegrt started working as a part of the Georgia national team coaching team together with Klaus Toppmöller. Between 2006 and 2008, Šegrt also accepted the role as the head coach of the Georgia U-21 national team where in a very short time, he developed more than 18 players who have played or are still playing for the Georgia national team. With Šegrt as coach, the Georgia U-21 national team achieved one of the biggest achievements in Georgian national football history with a 2–0 victory against the Russia U21 national team in the 2007 European U-21 Cup qualification. After Klaus Toppmöller left the Georgia national team on 1 April 2008, Šegrt was appointed as the first technical director in the history of the Georgian Football Federation. He also led the Georgia national team as head coach in friendly games against Estonia and Portugal in May 2008, before Georgian Football Federation appointed Héctor Cúper as head coach on 1 August 2008. In addition to his coaching skills, Šegrt became very popular in Georgia during the Russo-Georgian War in 2008, after his famous speech at Rustaveli Square in Tbilisi, where he promised to the thousands of Georgian people whom had gathered there, that he would not leave their country despite the war.

After his great work in Georgia, in December 2008, Germany's leading sports magazine Kicker announced that the German Football Association had chosen Šegrt as one of the candidates for taking over the Germany national U-21 football team.

=== Bali Devata ===
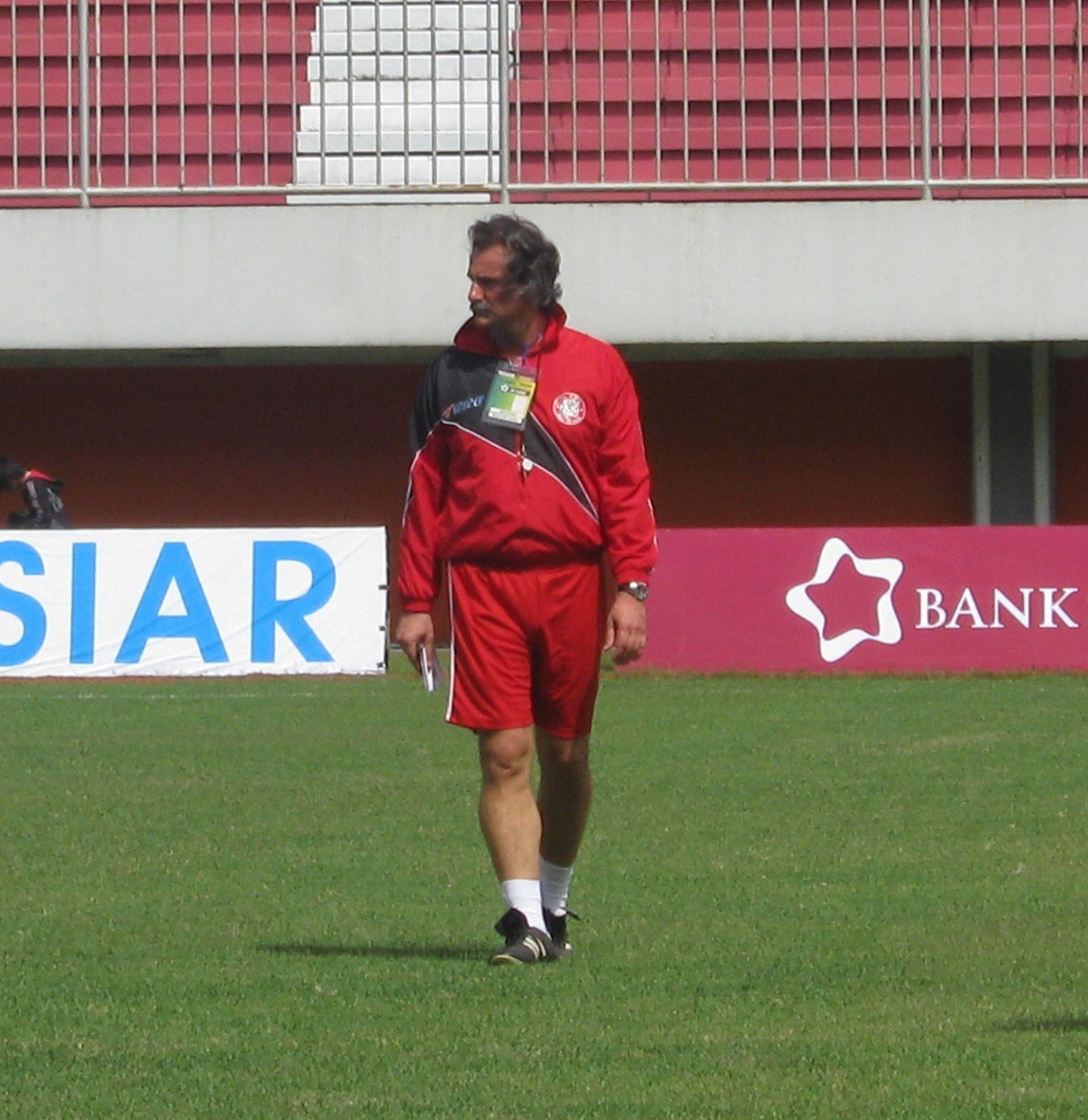
Šegrt as Bali Devata manager in 2011

In the end of 2010, Konsorsium Liga Premier Indonesia invited Šegrt to be a part and help them with his coaching and managing experience to build a new club in Indonesian professional football based in Bali, so Šegrt approached Bali Devata which competed in Liga Primer Indonesia. After he finished his job with Bali Devata, the same consortium offered him a new job as head coach of former Indonesian champion PSM Makassar.

=== PSM Makassar ===
In October 2011 Šegrt was appointed as the head coach of PSM Makassar, which was a very popular and successful club in Indonesia, now competing in Liga 1, the men's top professional football division of Indonesian football. After only one season in the Indonesian Premier League, Šegrt developed 10 new Indonesian national players, among whom six players were invited to the Indonesia national football team and four players were invited to the Indonesia U-23 national team. After the success Šegrt achieved that season, in July 2012 PSM Makassar's management offered him a 5 years contract extension, which is very uncommon for Indonesian clubs. Šegrt also has an unbeaten home record in the Indonesian Premier League, which was a first for PSM Makassar in the club's 97-year history, although he had the youngest team in the Indonesian Premier League with an average age of 22. In December 2012, Šegrt led the team to a victory in the Walikota Cup in Ternate, which was the first trophy for PSM Makassar after almost 12 years. Although his contract lasted until 2017, after the game in June 2013, Šegrt decided to leave PSM Makassar for private reasons. The club's supporters showed their disappointment in the decision of their favorite coach, but together with the president and the club's management l, they invited Šegrt to attend the next home game in July 2013. The stadium was filled with fans who bid goodbye to Šegrt, which was very unusual for Indonesian fans.

=== Zvijezda Gradačac ===
After leaving PSM Makassar, Šegrt was a candidate to coach the Indonesia national football team. But in September 2014, he accepted an offer from the Bosnian Premier League club Zvijezda Gradačac. Although Šegrt brought Zvijezda to the middle of the table, in April 2015 the club had a change in management which decided to appoint a new coach. It ended up being a poor decision however, as the club got relegated from the Premier League shortly after Šegrt left.

=== Afghanistan national team ===
In November 2015, the Afghanistan Football Federation announced Šegrt's appointment as their new head coach. Šegrt promised he will use his experience and knowledge to develop football in Afghanistan.

Šegrt won six from eight official matches with Afghanistan. He won four SAAF Championship matches and lost one in overtime against home team India in the final 1–2. In the qualifiers for the 2018 FIFA World Cup in Russia, Šegrt lost only to Japan and won two other matches. He helped achieved Afghanistan's biggest success in the AFC Asia Cup with Afghanistan's direct qualification, which was also its first ever. After this, the Afghanistan Football Federation decided to appoint a new head coach.

=== Maldives national team ===
In March 2018, the Football Association of Maldives signed a two-year contract with Šegrt as their new head coach. He won his first official match in the AFC Asian Cup qualifiers with a 7–0 victory against Bhutan, which was the first win for Maldives after 288 days. In September 2018, the Maldives made a big surprise by winning the SAFF Suzuki Cup 2018 in Bangladesh against all odds. In the final, they won 2–1 against the favorites, India. For Šegrt himself however, that was his second final of the SAFF Suzuki Cup as he led Afghanistan until the final 2 years earlier, which he lost to India 1–2. On 7 January 2020, head coach Šegrt and the Football Association of Maldives agreed on a mutually agreed termination of the contract.

=== Tajikistan national team ===
On 27 January 2022, the Tajikistan Football Federation announced Šegrt as their new head coach. Under Šegrt, Tajikistan managed to achieve a historic feat, qualifying for the 2023 AFC Asian Cup, which also was the country's first-ever appearance in a major continental football competition in its history, having failed to qualify for the Asian Cup five times before. Šegrt also guided Tajikistan to win the 2022 King's Cup in Thailand and the 2023 Merdeka Tournament in Malaysia where he had an average squad age of 21.1.

In the 2023 Asian Cup, Tajikistan achieved a draw (0–0, against China PR), and after a 0–1 defeat to Qatar and a 2–1 victory against heavily favored Lebanon, Tajikistan qualified for the Round of 16.

Tajikistan upset the UAE 5–3 in a penalty shootout on 28 January 2024 to advance to the 2023 Asian Cup quarter-finals after the game ended 1–1 after extra time.

== Managerial statistics ==
As of match played 2 February 2024

Team	Nat.	From	To	Record							
Team	Nat.	From	To	G	W	D	L	GF	GA	GD	Win %
DSV Leoben	(Austria)	1 September 2001	7 January 2003	25	13	4	8	45	31	+14	52.00
SV Ried	(Austria)	1 July 2003	11 November 2003	21	10	5	6	36	27	+9	47.62
WSC	(Austria)	1 July 2004	1 November 2005	2	1	0	1	4	7	−3	50.00
Georgia U-21	(Georgia (country))	6 February 2007	31 December 2008	8	2	0	6	6	22	−16	25.00
Georgia	(Georgia (country))	1 April 2008	31 July 2008	2	0	1	1	1	3	−2	0.00
Zvijezda Gradačac	(Bosnia and Herzegovina)	5 September 2014	19 April 2015	21	5	6	10	28	36	−8	23.81
Afghanistan	(Afghanistan)	1 November 2015	13 February 2017	10	6	1	3	23	12	+11	60.00
Maldives	(Maldives)	11 March 2018	19 December 2019	11	5	1	5	18	16	+2	45.45
Tajikistan	(Tajikistan)	27 January 2022	16 February 2024	24	9	10	5	30	20	+10	37.50
Total				124	51	28	45	191	174	+17	41.13

== Honours ==
=== Managerial ===
Maldives

- SAFF Championship: 2018

Tajikistan

- King's Cup: 2022
- Merdeka Tournament: 2023
