= Ali Parhizi =

Iranian-German footballer

Personal information
- Date of birth: 29 March 1983 (age 43)
- Place of birth: Stuttgart, West Germany
- Height: 1.75 m (5 ft 9 in)
- Position: Midfielder

Youth career
- –2000: VfB Stuttgart
- 2000–2002: SSV Reutlingen

Senior career*
Years	Team	Apps	(Gls)
2002–2003	SSV Reutlingen II		
2003	Offenburger FV		
2003–2004	Olympia Laupheim	1	(1)
2004–2005	TSV Crailsheim	25	(1)
2005–2006	Heidenheimer SB	23	(1)
2006	Eintracht Trier	5	(0)
2006–2008	SGV Freiberg	16	(0)
2008	Stuttgarter Kickers II	12	(1)
2008–2009	FC Kreuzlingen	14	(2)
2009–2010	APEP FC	10	(1)
2011	Bali Devata		(1)
2013	Hải Phòng		
2013–2015	Edgeworth	5	(1)
- * Club domestic league appearances and goals

Ali Parhizi (Persian: علی پرهیزی; born 29 March 1983) is a German former professional footballer who played as a midfielder.

== Career ==
=== Germany ===
Parhizi played for VfB Stuttgart as a youth. Having been unable to break through to the first team playing in the 2. Bundesliga at SSV Reutlingen, he joined Offenburger FV in January 2003. In December he wanted to leave the club.

Parhizi moved to Eintracht Trier from Heidenheimer SB in July 2006.

=== Indonesia ===
Parhizi scored his first goal for Bali Devata of the Liga Primer Indonesia on the 12th minute in a 2–2 tie with Tangerang Wolves.

=== Vietnam ===
In 2013, he trialled for Hải Phòng of the Vietnamese V.League 1.

=== Australia ===
Cleared to participate in games for Edgeworth of the Northern NSW State League in 2013, the midfielder was suspended for a week for his impetuous actions which earned him a second yellow card.

== Career statistics ==
As of 3 July 2019

Appearances and goals by club, season and competition
Club	Season	League			Cup		Other		Total	
Club	Season	Division	Apps	Goals	Apps	Goals	Apps	Goals	Apps	Goals
Olympia Laupheim	2003–04	Verbandsliga	1	1	0	0	—		1	1
TSV Crailsheim	2004–05	Oberliga Baden-Württemberg	25	1	0	0	—		25	1
1. FC Heidenheim	2005–06	Oberliga Baden-Württemberg	23	1	0	0	—		23	1
Eintracht Trier	2006–07	Oberliga Baden-Württemberg	5	0	0	0	—		5	0
SGV Freiberg	2006–07	Oberliga Baden-Württemberg	16	0	0	0	—		16	0
SGV Freiberg	2007–08	Oberliga Baden-Württemberg	0	0	0	0	—		0	0
SGV Freiberg	Total		16	0	0	0	—		16	0
Stuttgarter Kickers II	2007–08	Oberliga Baden-Württemberg	12	1	0	0	—		12	1
FC Kreuzlingen	2008–09	Swiss 1. Liga	14	2	0	0	0	0	14	2
APEP FC	2009–10	Cypriot First Division	10	1	0	0	—		10	1
Career total			106	7	0	0	0	0	106	7
