= Robert Roelofsen =

Dutch football manager (born 1970)

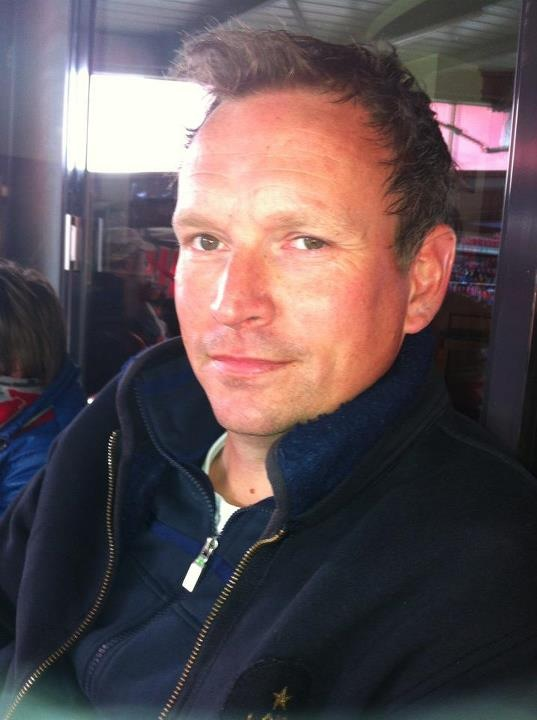

Personal information
- Date of birth: 26 March 1970 (age 56)
- Place of birth: Netherlands

Managerial career
- Years: Team
- 2011: Bintang Medan F.C.
- 2014: F.C. Hansa Rostock
- 2016: Tvøroyrar Bóltfelag

Robert Roelofsen (born 26 March 1970 in the Netherlands) is a Dutch football manager.
