= Regilio Jacobs =

Dutch football player

Personal information
- Date of birth: 12 August 1987 (age 39)
- Place of birth: Oss, Netherlands
- Height: 1.84 m (6 ft 0 in)
- Position: Right back

Youth career
- RKSV Prinses Irene
- 1999–2006: TOP Oss

Senior career*
Years	Team	Apps	(Gls)
2006–2010	TOP Oss	86	(2)
2011	Tangerang Wolves		
2011–2012	Dijkse Boys		
2012–2013	RKSV Margriet		
2013–2017	DESO		
- * Club domestic league appearances and goals

Regilio Jacobs (born 12 August 1987) is a Dutch former professional footballer who played as a right back.

== Career ==
Jacobs started his youth career with RKSV Prinses Irene before moving to the TOP Oss academy as a U12 player. He made his debut in professional football on 21 August 2006 against FC Emmen. In early 2011, he began playing for Tangerang Wolves in the Liga Primer Indonesia. In the 2011–12 season, he moved to Dutch Hoofdklasse club Dijkse Boys. He then played for RKSV Margriet and RKVV DESO, where he announced his retirement in 2017.

== Personal life ==
On 2 November 2011, Jacobs made his reality television debut as a participant in the program New Chicks: Brabantse Nachten in Curaçao. At the end of 2015, he took part in the Dutch version of Temptation Island, which was broadcast from February 2016.
