= Uwe Erkenbrecher =

German footballer and manager

Personal information
- Full name: Uwe Jürgen Erkenbrecher
- Date of birth: 14 November 1954 (age 71)
- Place of birth: Delmenhorst, West Germany
- Height: 1.84 m (6 ft 0 in)
- Position: Midfielder

Youth career
- 1960–1961: SC Grün-Weiß Lichtenbusch
- 1963–1967: Bremer SV
- 1967–1973: Werder Bremen

Senior career*
Years	Team	Apps	(Gls)
1972–1975	Werder Bremen	24	(1)
1975–1977	Wattenscheid 09	19	(0)
1977–1978	1. SC Göttingen 05		
1978–1979	KSV Baunatal	27	(1)
1979–1980	Atlas Delmenhorst		
1980–1983	1. FC Paderborn		
1983–1984	FC Stukenbrock		
1984–1986	Teutonia Lippstadt		
1986–1988	Borussia Lippstadt		

International career
1973	Germany U-19		

Managerial career
- 1984–1986: Teutonia Lippstadt (as player-coach)
- 1986–1988: Borussia Lippstadt (as player-coach)
- 1991–1993: VfL Wolfsburg
- 1993–1995: VfL 93 Hamburg
- 1998–2000: VfB Lübeck
- 2000–2001: Greuther Fürth
- 2001–2003: SC Paderborn
- 2003–2004: SSV Reutlingen
- 2004–2007: VfL Wolfsburg II
- 2007–2007: VfB Lübeck
- 2008–2009: Türkiyemspor Berlin
- 2009–2010: Rot-Weiss Essen
- 2011–2012: Cendrawasih Papua
- 2013–2014: Tartu Tammeka
- 2014–2015: VfR Neumünster
- 2015–2018: MTV Gifhorn
- 2018: TSC Vahdet Braunschweig
- 2019–2020: Lupo Martini Wolfsburg
- * Club domestic league appearances and goals

Uwe Jürgen Erkenbrecher (born 14 November 1954) is a German football manager and a former player.

== Honours ==
Individual

- Meistriliiga Manager of the Month: June 2013
