= Jörg Steinebrunner =

German footballer and coach

Personal information
- Full name: Jörg Peter Steinebrunner
- Date of birth: 22 October 1971 (age 55)
- Place of birth: Schönau im Schwarzwald, West Germany
- Position: Defender

Senior career*
Years	Team	Apps	(Gls)
- SC Freiburg Amateure
–1993	SG Lörrach-Stetten		
1993–1994	Freiburger FC		
1994	FC Schönau		
- Old Boys Basel
1998	Tanjong Pagar United		
1999	Woodlands Wellington		
2000–2001	Gombak United		
2002	Balestier Central		

International career
- Germany U-21

Managerial career
- 2006–2008: Woodlands Wellingon
- 2009: Sengkang Punggol
- 2010–2011: Medan Chiefs
- 2011–2012: Deltras Sidoarjo
- 2013–2014: PSM Makassar
- 2014–2015: Geylang International
- 2016: Warriors
- 2017–2018: Negeri Sembilan
- 2019–2020: Kelantan (technical director)
- 2020–2022: Udon Thani
- 2022: Nakhon Si United
- 2023: Samutsongkhram
- 2023–2024: Angthong
- 2024: Thimphu City
- 2024–2025: Sihanoukville
- 2025–2026: Nakhon Si United
- 2025: Aguilas–UMak
- * Club domestic league appearances and goals

Jörg Peter Steinebrunner (born 22 October 1971) is a German football coach.

== Playing career ==
As a player he has played for FC Schönau, SC Freiburg Amateure, SG Lörrach-Stetten, Freiburger FC and Old Boys Basel. He also has played in Singapore, for Tanjong Pagar United where he won the Singapore FA Cup and the Singapore League Cup with them.

== Coaching career ==
=== Woodlands Wellington and Sengkang Punggol ===
After retiring from playing in 2003, Steinebrunner moves into coaching, and were appointed as Woodlands Wellington head coach in 2006. He stepped down at the end of the 2008 season, after management restructuring in the club. During his stay with the club, they won the 2007 Singapore League Cup and were the 2008 Singapore Cup runners-up.

Sengkang Punggol was his next destination for the 2009 season, but his job were terminated in the middle of the season due to poor performance of his team.

=== Medan Chiefs and Deltras Sidoarjo ===
In early 2011, he was appointed as the head coach of Medan Chiefs in the Liga Primer Indonesia, the alternate top division of Indonesia. He coached Medan Chiefs in what was to be the only season of the club (and the league).

He then was appointed Deltras Sidoarjo head coach in September the same year, for their 2011–12 Indonesia Super League season, but resigned in April 2012.

=== PSM Makassar ===
In November 2013, Steinebrunner was signed by PSM Makassar as their new head coach for the 2014 Indonesia Super League season. Not winning a single game with PSM Makassar he resigned in February 2014 and replaced by Rudy Keltjes shortly thereafter.

=== Geylang International ===
He returned to Singapore as the new head coach of Geylang International in 2015. Winning seven matches in a row, his biggest win at the helm of Geylang International was a 6–0 victory over Warriors F.C.

=== Warriors ===
In early 2016, Steinebrunner were signed by Warriors, initially as joint head coach with existing head coach Karim Bencherifa. But when Bencherifa then terminated his contract with Warriors before the season began, Steinebrunner were tasked as the sole head coch of the team. He bought Yazid Yasin, Hafiz Osman, Hafiz Nor, Kento Fukuda, Shaiful Esah, Zulfadli Zainal Abidin, and Poh Yi Feng as well as the signing of Singapore starter Madhu Mohana in the off-season for Warriors.

Throughout the season, Warrior were hovering on the lower half of the league table, and this adds pressure to him. An example of this was shown in the league match against his former team Geylang International in April, when an enraged Steinbrunner excoriated the referee after a controversial penalty appeal was allowed, making the score 2–2 in the 50th minute, winning 4–2 at full-time. In the post-match press conference he stated that 'it's not the right way to play football'. He stepped down as Warriors coach in May 2016 after a series of 'mediocre' displays.

=== Negeri Sembilan FA ===
Assigned the role of Negeri Sembilan FA chief director in November 2016, he is also in charge of Negeri Sembilan FA's internal youth system. Is seen as the man responsible for the transformation of Negeri Sembilan FA into one of the leading clubs in the 2017 Malaysia Premier League.

He was appointed as the new head coach of Negeri Sembilan for the 2018 Malaysia Super League campaign, but he stepped down from the position after only five games into the season, winning only one of those games.

== All-time statistics ==
Year	Club	Matches	Win Percentage
2016	Warriors F.C.	10	20%
2015	Geylang International FC	27	32%
2014	Geylang International FC	26	39%

== Foundations ==
Steinebrunner created the Cosmos United Football Academy in 2005 to develop children's psychomotor and to improve their football ability.
