= Deniss Romanovs =

Latvian footballer

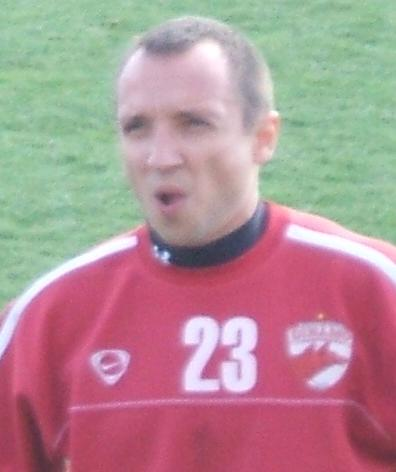
- Romanovs with Dinamo București in 2007

Personal information
- Full name: Deniss Romanovs
- Date of birth: 2 September 1978 (age 48)
- Place of birth: Riga, then part of Latvian SSR, Soviet Union
- Height: 1.86 m (6 ft 1 in)
- Position: Goalkeeper

Team information
- Current team: Riga Mariners (goalkeeping coach)

Youth career
- Skonto-2

Senior career*
Years	Team	Apps	(Gls)
1996−1997	Skonto-Metāls	14	(0)
1997−2000	Valmiera	38	(0)
2000−2005	Ventspils	76	(0)
2005−2007	Ditton	28	(0)
2007−2008	Dinamo București	8	(0)
2009−2010	Slavia Prague	8	(0)
2010−2011	Khazar Lenkoran	12	(0)
2011−2012	Cenderawasih Papua	18	(0)
2012−2013	Arema Indonesia	28	(0)
2013−2014	Pro Duta	22	(1)
2014−2015	Pelita Bandung Raya	29	(0)
2016	RFS	0	(0)
2017	Riga	0	(0)
Total		281	(1)

International career^{‡}
2004−2013	Latvia	4	(0)

Managerial career
- 2021: Riga (goalkeeping coach)
- 2022–2024: Riga II (goalkeeping coach)
- 2025–: Riga Mariners (goalkeeping coach)
- * Club domestic league appearances and goals as of 07:11, 2 April 2017 (UTC) ‡ National team caps and goals as of 1 December 2013

Deniss Romanovs (born 2 September 1978) is a Latvian professional football coach and former player who played as a goalkeeper. He is currently the goalkeeping coach of Latvian First League club Riga Mariners.

== Club career ==
His early career was spent with Latvian sides Skonto-Metāls, Valmiera, Ventspils and Ditton.

During the 2008–09 season he joined Slavia Prague.

In July 2010 Romanovs moved to Azerbaijan, signing a two-year deal with Khazar Lankaran.

In January 2011 he joined Indonesian club Cendrawasih Papua ahead of the inaugural (and only) Liga Primer Indonesia season. During the half-season break, the league was stopped due to internal problems. The club was dissolved almost immadiately.

Before the start of the 2013 season, Romanovs joined Indonesian Premier League newcomers Pro Duta. On 24 October 2013 he scored a goal from the penalty spot in a 6-0 league victory over Bontang. On 28 November 2013, Romanovs signed with Pelita Bandung Raya.

== International career ==
Romanovs made his debut for Latvia in a friendly match against Bahrain in 2004.

== Honours ==
Individual

- Indonesia Super League Best Goalkepper: 2014
- Indonesia Super League Player of the Month: Oktober 2014
