= José Basualdo =

Argentine footballer and manager

Personal information
- Full name: José Horacio Basualdo
- Date of birth: 20 June 1963 (age 63)
- Place of birth: Campana, Buenos Aires, Argentina
- Height: 1.77 m (5 ft 9 1/2 in)
- Position: Midfielder

Senior career*
Years	Team	Apps	(Gls)
1981–1987	Villa Dálmine	157	(17)
1987–1989	Deportivo Mandiyú	84	(4)
1989–1991	VfB Stuttgart	47	(6)
1991–1992	Racing Club	41	(0)
1993–1995	Vélez Sársfield	119	(4)
1996	Boca Juniors	25	(2)
1996–1997	→ Extremadura (loan)	23	(1)
1997	→ Deportivo Español (loan)	16	(0)
1998	→ Real Jaen (loan)	21	(3)
1998–2001	Boca Juniors	57	(3)
2001	Extremadura	11	(0)
2001–2002	Vélez Sársfield	3	(0)
2002–2003	Villa Dálmine	29	(2)
2006	Centenario (Nqn)	1	(0)
Total		634	(42)

International career
1989–1995	Argentina	31	(0)

Managerial career
- 2004: Deportivo Quito
- 2005: Universitario de Deportes
- 2006: El Porvenir
- 2006: José Gálvez
- 2007: Cienciano
- 2008-2009: Santiago Morning
- 2009: Universidad de Chile
- 2011–2012: Real Mataram
- 2012: Técnico Universitario
- 2013–2014: Atlético Bucaramanga (director of football)
- 2015: Oriente Petrolero
- 2017–2018: Cerro
- 2021: Academia Puerto Cabello
Medal record
Men's football
Representing Argentina
Copa América
Winner	1993 Ecuador
FIFA World Cup
Runner-up	1990 Italy
- * Club domestic league appearances and goals

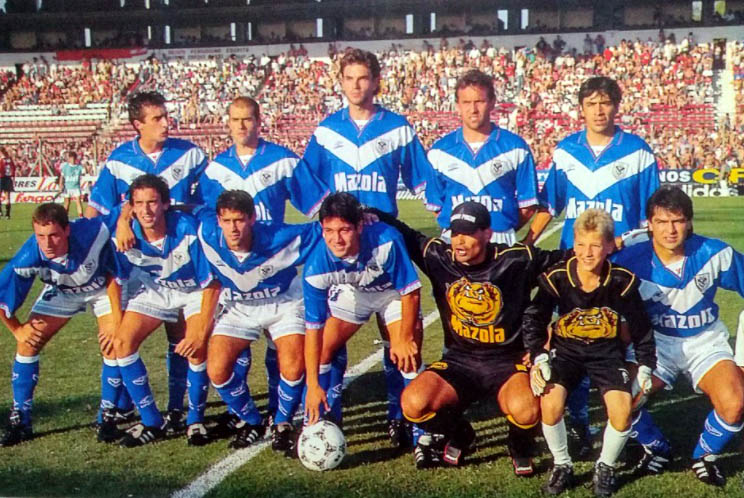
Basualdo (furthest right above) with the 1995 Velez Sarsfield team

José Horacio Basualdo (born 20 June 1963) is an Argentine football manager and former player who played as a midfielder.

== Club career ==
Basualdo won several Argentine and international titles with both Vélez Sársfield and Boca Juniors.

== International career ==
Basualdo played 31 matches for the Argentina national team between 1989 and 1995 and played for the Argentina national football team in the 1990 and 1994 World Cups.

At the 1990 FIFA World Cup, in the Round of 16 match against Brazil, Basualdo broke clean through on goal, only to be hacked down by Brazil's captain Ricardo Gomes, who was duly sent off.

== Coaching career ==
After retiring as a player, he worked as the coach of Peruvian teams Universitario de Deportes, Cienciano, Deportivo Quito, El Porvenir, Santiago Morning and Universidad de Chile, Real Mataram.

In 2006, he had a brief spell at Club El Porvenir, in Argentina, where he was relegated after drawing one match and losing six. During his brief stay at the Gerli club, Basualdo was the protagonist of an event that would generate the total repudiation of the fans. During matchday 5 of the 2006 Clausura Tournament, his team was supposed to visit Huracán in Parque de los Patricios, but instead of being on the substitutes' bench guiding his team, Basualdo went to Brazil to play Showbol, which for many was seen as a lack of commitment to the club from the South.

== Honours ==
Villa Dálmine

- Primera C Metropolitana: 1982

Deportivo Mandiyú

- Primera B Nacional: 1987–88

Vélez Sársfield

- Primera División: 1993 Clausura, 1995 Apertura
- Copa Libertadores: 1994
- Intercontinental Cup: 1994

Boca Juniors

- Primera División: 1998 Apertura, 1999 Clausura, 2000 Apertura
- Copa Libertadores: 2000
- Intercontinental Cup: 2000

Argentina

- Copa América: 1993
- FIFA World Cup runner-up: 1990
