= Mario Karlović =

Australian soccer player

Mario Karlovic
Personal information
- Full name: Mario Karlovic
- Date of birth: 29 May 1984 (age 42)
- Place of birth: Adelaide, Australia
- Height: 1.82 m (5 ft 11 1/2 in)
- Position: Central midfielder

Youth career
- 1997–2000: SASI

Senior career*
Years	Team	Apps	(Gls)
2000–2002	Adelaide City Force	16	(3)
2000	→ Adelaide Raiders (loan)	7	(0)
2003–2006	A.S. Cittadella	9	(0)
2006–2007	Torino F.C.	8	(0)
2006–2007	→ FC Chiasso (loan)	16	(1)
2007–2009	AS Viterbese	26	(0)
2009–2010	Brisbane Roar	6	(0)
2010–2011	Minangkabau F.C.	18	(3)
2011–2013	Persebaya 1927	66	(16)
2014	Terengganu	29	(5)
2015	ATM FA	22	(2)
2016	Kuala Lumpur FA	12	(0)
2017	Adelaide Blue Eagles	20	(1)

International career^{‡}
2001	Australia U-17	6	(0)
- * Club domestic league appearances and goals as of 18 August 2017 ‡ National team caps and goals as of 2 January 2016

Mario Karlovic (born 29 May 1984) is an Australian former footballer. Karlovic played as a creative attacking midfielder, but could also play as a defensive midfielder. He was known for his free kicks and creative play.

== Club career ==
Karlovic commenced his football career at Adelaide City Force signing for the NSL club as a 15-year-old in 2000. During his time at the club he represented the Australian Joeys in the Under 17 World Cup Qualifiers.

He was sold to Serie B club A.S. Cittadella in 2002 after also receiving interest from AC Milan. Karlović was unable to fulfill an invitation from the Italian giants due to a foot injury. He has spent the majority of his football career playing in Italy. He previously played for A.S. Cittadella in Serie C1 before he signed for Serie A side Torino FC after interest from Internazionale and Sampdoria. At Torino he was immediately loaned out to Swiss club FC Chiasso who were coached by Attilio Lombardo. Upon his return from his loan spell at FC Chiasso, he encountered passport issues and signed for Serie D club AS Viterbese.

On 24 September 2009 it was confirmed by Brisbane Roar manager Frank Farina that Karlovic would play for the Brisbane-based club on a short-term contract to cover the loss of Massimo Murdocca to injury.

Karlović signed for Minangkabau FC in December 2010 in the Liga Primer Indonesia where he helped the club to a mid table finish scoring 3 goals from a defensive midfield position in 18 games. His performances caught the attention of champions Persebaya 1927 whom he signed for in August 2011. He joined Terengganu FA of the Malaysia Super League for the 2014 season but left them at the end of the season as the management did not extend his one-year contract. He moved on to ATM FA in 2015 before joinining Kuala Lumpur FA in 2016.
