= Amarildo (footballer, born 1976) =

Brazilian footballer

Amarildo Souza
Personal information
- Full name: Amarildo Luis de Souza
- Date of birth: 12 January 1976 (age 50)
- Place of birth: Brazil
- Height: 1.74 m (5 ft 8 1/2 in)
- Position: Midfielder

Senior career*
Years	Team	Apps	(Gls)
2008–2009	Persijap Jepara	22	(5)
2009–2010	Persik Kediri	20	(3)
2010–2011	Semarang United	16	(2)
- * Club domestic league appearances and goals

Amarildo Luis de Souza (born 12 January 1976) is a Brazilian footballer that previously played for Semarang United in the Liga Primer Indonesia.
