= Michael Feichtenbeiner =

German football coach

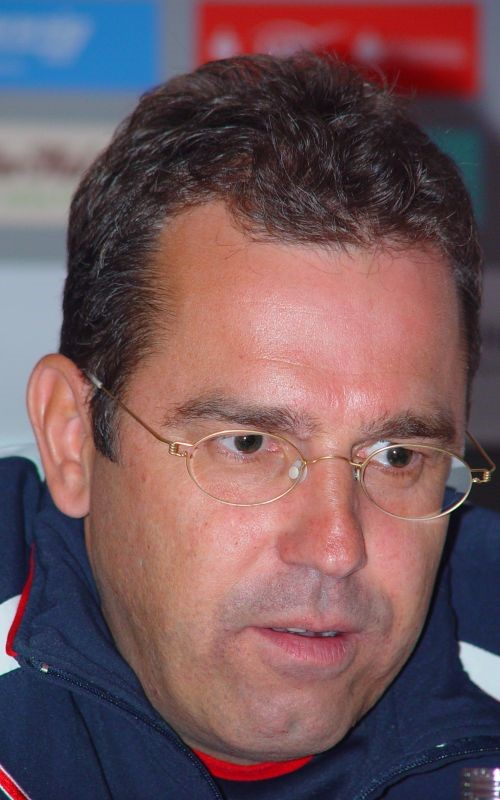
- Feichtenbeiner in 2006

Personal information
- Full name: Michael Feichtenbeiner
- Date of birth: 9 July 1960 (age 66)
- Place of birth: Stuttgart, West Germany
- Height: 1.81 m (5 ft 11 in)

Managerial career
- Years: Team
- 1989–1992: BSC Old Boys Basel
- 1993–1997: TSF Ditzingen
- 1998–1999: SC Pfullendorf
- 1999–2000: Stuttgarter Kickers
- 2000–2002: SV Darmstadt 98
- 2002–2003: Rot-Weiß Erfurt
- 2003–2004: Sportfreunde Siegen
- 2005–2006: MPPJ FC
- 2006–2008: SC Pfullendorf
- 2010–2011: Bintang Medan FC
- 2016–2019: Germany U-15 to U-17
- 2019: Liefering (assistant)
- 2019: Liefering (caretaker)
- 2020–2021: Selangor II
- 2021–2022: Selangor
- 2023-2024: Myanmar
- 2023-2024: Myanmar U-22

Michael Feichtenbeiner (born 9 July 1960) is a German football manager.

== Early career ==
After playing for amateur teams of TV Gültstein, SV Vaihingen and FV Germania Degerloch, Feichtenbeiner started coaching in VfB Stuttgart as youth coach. A spell as head coach at Swiss club BSC Old Boys Basel and assistant coach at Stuttgarter Kickers followed, before he was appointed as head coach of TSF Ditzingen. From 1993 to 1997 he oversaw the promotion of the club from Oberliga Baden-Württemberg to Regionalliga Süd. Feichtenbeiner then becomes the assistant coach for KFC Uerdingen 05 in 1997, and head coach of SC Pfullendorf in 1998.

== Head coaching career ==
In the summer of 1999 Feichtenbeiner was appointed as head coach of Stuttgarter Kickers, his first job as head coach of a 2. Bundesliga club. Under his charge, the club made waves in the DFB Cup, defeating three Bundesliga clubs (Borussia Dortmund, Arminia Bielefeld and SC Freiburg) en route to the semi-finals where they were finally eliminated by Werder Bremen after extra time. However the club's league form were poor, and Feichtenbeiner was fired in March 2000 having only gained 21 points from 24 matches and left the club in the relegation zone.

Feichtenbeiner later coached several Regionalliga Süd teams (SV Darmstadt 98, Rot-Weiß Erfurt, Sportfreunde Siegen) before coaching in Malaysia for MPPJ FC in 2005, saving them from relegation to Malaysia Premier League. After being fired by MPPJ FC in early August 2006 while the club were leading the Malaysia Super League, he was reappointed as head coach of SC Pfullendorf in late 2006.

He also held the post of sporting director at Energie Cottbus in 2009–2010, and was the head coach of Bintang Medan FC of Indonesia in 2010–2011.

Feichtenbeiner worked as sporting director of SV Wehen Wiesbaden, where he joined in late December 2012, until his dismissal at the end of 2014–15 season.

He was appointed as head coach of Germany under-15 national football team in 2016. That team became the Under-16 and then the Under-17 squad as the players aged.

=== Selangor F.C. ===
In December 2019, he was appointed by Selangor F.C. as Technical Director. He is also responsible to coach their reserve team, Selangor F.C. II.

On 20 November 2021, he was appointed by Selangor F.C. as Head Coach to replace Karsten Neitzel. On 9 August 2022 Selangor FC announce that the management and Michael Feichtenbeiner have mutually agreed to let go of his position as the First Team Head Coach of Selangor FC and continue the football development project as Selangor FC's Sporting Director which he has held since 2020 until 2022.
