= Odri =

Odri Одри Odër
- Village
- Location within North Macedonia
- Coordinates: 42°07′N 21°05′E
- Country: North Macedonia
- Region: Polog
- Municipality: Tearce

Population (2002)
  - Total: 1,739
- Time zone: UTC+1 (CET)
  - Summer (DST): UTC+2 (CEST)
- Car plates: TE
- Website: .

Odri (Macedonian: Одри, Albanian: Odër) is a village in the municipality of Tearce, North Macedonia.

== History ==
Odri is attested in the 1467/68 Ottoman tax registry (defter) for the Nahiyah of Kalkandelen. The village had a total of 71 Christian households, 5 bachelors and 8 widows.

According to the 1467–68 Ottoman defter, Odri exhibits a majority Orthodox Slavic and minority Albanian anthroponomy.

== Demographics ==
According to the 2002 census, the village had a total of 1,739 inhabitants. Ethnic groups in the village include:

- Albanians 1,598
- Macedonians 139
- Serbs 2

In statistics gathered by Vasil Kanchov in 1900, the village of Odri was inhabited by 210 Christian Bulgarians and 110 Muslim Albanians.

== Notable people ==
- Remzi Nesimi Albanian university professor (1933–2018)
- Mahmut Ferati Albanian singer
