= Rinto =

Rinto is an Indonesian masculine given name that may refer to the following notable people:

- Rinto Ali (born 1989), Indonesian football midfielder
- Rinto Harahap (1949–2015), Indonesian singer-songwriter
- Rinto Hanashiro (born 2005), Japanese professional footballer
