= Fred Agius =

Australian footballer

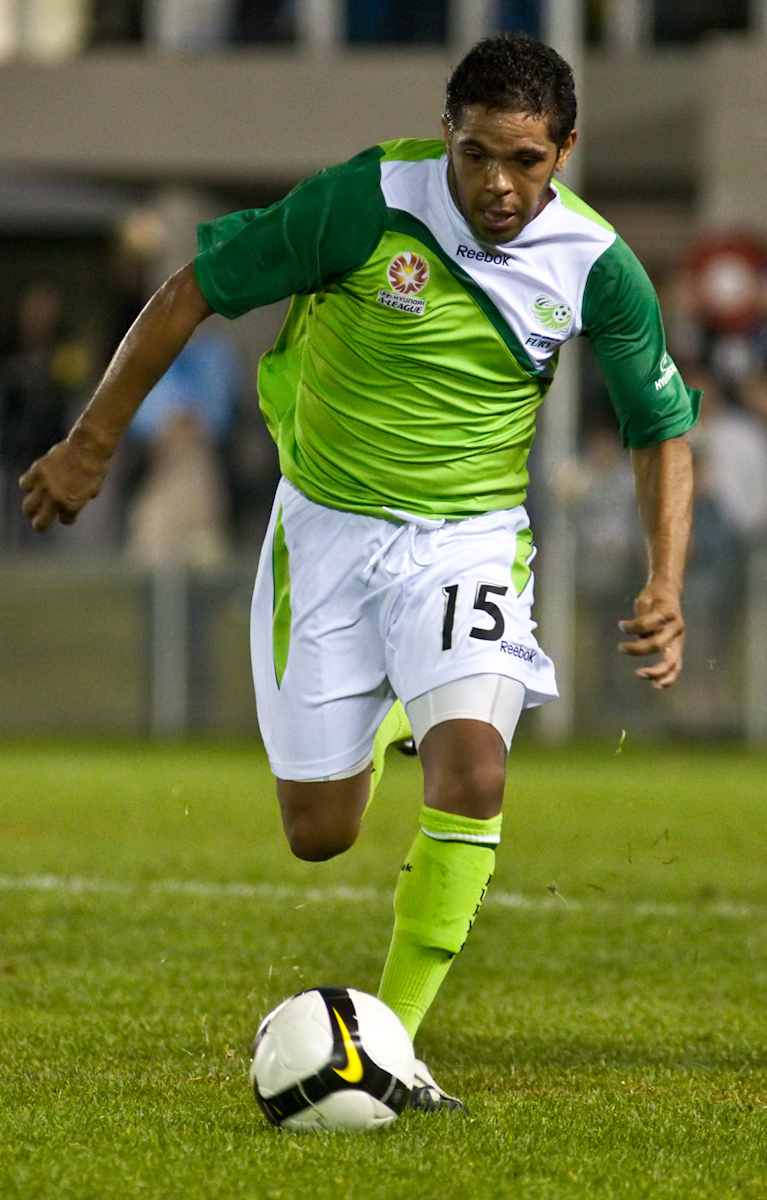

Personal information
- Full name: Frederick Agius
- Date of birth: 2 February 1984 (age 42)
- Place of birth: Adelaide, Australia
- Height: 1.68 m (5 ft 6 in)
- Position: Left midfielder

Youth career
- Adelaide City
- SASI

Senior career*
Years	Team	Apps	(Gls)
2000–2001	Playford City	3	(0)
2001–2003	Sydney Olympic	4	(1)
2003–2004	Adelaide United	13	(1)
2004–2005	Playford City	20	(6)
2005–2006	Adelaide Blue Eagles	14	(2)
2006–2009	Adelaide City	50	(12)
2009–2010	North Queensland Fury	5	(0)
2010–2011	Adelaide City	8	(1)
2011–2012	Cendrawasih Papua	18	(8)
2013–2017	Brahma Lodge		

International career
2001	Australia U17		
2004	Australia U23		

Managerial career
- 2017–: Brahma Lodge
- * Club domestic league appearances and goals

Frederick "Fred" Agius (born 2 February 1984) is an Australian footballer who plays for South Australian Amateur Soccer League team Brahma Lodge. In 2003, he played Australian rules football for Central District in the South Australian National Football League (SANFL) reserve grade, making him one of few people to play at semi-professional level in both football and Australian rules.

== Football career ==
Between 1998 and 2000 Agius played underage football for the South Australian Sport Institute in the SAPL Under 23 division. Agius in 2001 was selected in the Australian team that played in the 2001 FIFA U-17 World Championship. Agius played four matches, scoring one goal. In a warm-up match prior to the tournament Agius scored six goals in a match against American Samoa.

In 2001 Agius moved to Playford City before moving to Sydney Olympic FC for the 2001/02 season of the National Soccer League. At Olympic he managed four appearances as a substitute.

At the beginning of the 2003/04 NSL season Agius moved back to the round ball game and to the new Adelaide United team set up in the wake of the withdrawal of Adelaide City from the competition. In the 2003/04 season he managed 13 appearances, scoring one goal. At the completion of the 2003/04 NSL season Agius returned to Adelaide City.

In November 2008 A-League expansion team North Queensland Fury enquired as to Agius' availability to which Adelaide City set a transfer fee of A$20,000. In December 2008 North Queensland Fury unveiled Agius as their latest signing. He is contracted for the 2009–2010 A-League season.

== Australian rules career ==
After the 2001–02 NSL season Agius decided to try his hand at Australian rules football, a sport he had played as a junior. Joining Central District he was able to hold a spot in the reserve grade team and won a premiership medal as a member of the victorious grand final team.
