= Josh Maguire =

Australian soccer player

Personal information
- Full name: Joshua James Maguire
- Date of birth: 22 September 1980 (age 46)
- Place of birth: Newcastle, Australia
- Height: 1.76 m (5 ft 9 1/2 in)
- Position: Midfielder

Senior career*
Years	Team	Apps	(Gls)
1998–1999	Newcastle Breakers	7	(0)
1999	Cessnock City Hornets		
2001	Blacktown City Demons		
2002	Highfields Azzurri		
2002–2003	Central Coast United	19	(3)
2003–2005	Blacktown City Demons	23	(3)
2005–2006	New Zealand Knights	13	(0)
2006–2007	Universitatea Craiova		
2007–2008	Azzurri FC		
2008–2009	Hồ Chí Minh City F.C.		
2009–2010	Persebaya Surabaya	18	(3)
2010–2011	PSPS Pekanbaru	12	(1)
2011–2012	Semarang United	16	(2)
2012–2013	Lampung Sakti	15	(1)
2013	Charlestown City	11	(1)
2014	Western Phnom Penh	16	(1)
2014–2018	Charlestown City		
2024- current	Cessnock City Hornets		
- * Club domestic league appearances and goals as of 30 March 2021

Joshua Maguire (born 22 September 1980) is an Australian former professional soccer midfielder.
