= Amâncio Fortes =

Angolan footballer

Personal information
- Full name: Amâncio José Pinto Fortes
- Date of birth: 18 April 1990 (age 36)
- Place of birth: Luanda, Angola
- Height: 1.70 m (5 ft 7 in)
- Position: Attacking midfielder

Team information
- Current team: União

Youth career
- 1999–2001: Rio de Mouro
- 2001–2004: Sporting CP
- 2004–2008: Real
- 2006–2007: → Manchester United (loan)
- 2008–2009: União da Madeira

Senior career*
Years	Team	Apps	(Gls)
2009	Recreativo do Libolo		
2010	Interclube		
2011	Semarang United		
2011–2014	Fátima	12	(1)
2015	CSKA Sofia		
2015	Zimbru Chișinău	5	(0)
2015–2016	Coruchense	26	(4)
2016	Zimbru Chișinău	8	(2)
2017–2018	Casa Pia	16	(1)
2017	Dacia Chișinău	13	(2)
2018–2019	Ventspils	13	(5)
2019–2020	Liepāja	26	(7)
2020–2021	Águeda	5	(2)
2021	Radomiak Radom	6	(0)
2021–2022	Jeunesse Esch	20	(2)
2022	Zimbru Chișinău	8	(1)
2023–2024	Unirea Ungheni	4	(1)
2024–	União	0	(0)
- * Club domestic league appearances and goals as of 5 June 2024

Amâncio José Pinto Fortes (born 18 April 1990) is an Angolan footballer who plays as an attacking midfielder for Setúbal Football Association club União. He also holds Portuguese citizenship.

== Honours ==
Radomiak Radom

- I liga: 2020–21
