= Maurito =

Angolan footballer (born 1981)

Personal information
- Full name: Norberto Mauro da Costa Mulenessa
- Date of birth: June 24, 1981 (age 45)
- Place of birth: Luanda, Angola
- Height: 1.88 m (6 ft 2 in)
- Positions: Striker; winger

Senior career*
Years	Team	Apps	(Gls)
2003–2004	União de Leiria	7	(0)
2004–2005	Al-Jazira		
2005–2007	Al-Wahda		
2007–2008	Al-Kuwait		
2008	Umm-Salal		
2008–2009	Al-Riffa		
2009	Al-Kuwait		
2009–2010	Al-Salmiya		
2010	Petro de Luanda		
2011–2012	Minangkabau F.C.		
2012	PSAP Sigli		
2012	C.R. Caála	3	(0)
2017	Santa Rita de Cássia	4	(0)

International career^{‡}
2004–2009	Angola	25	(4)
- * Club domestic league appearances and goals ‡ National team caps and goals as of July 18, 2009

Norberto Mauro da Costa Mulenessa known as Maurito (born June 24, 1981, in Luanda) is an Angolan football striker and winger. He was banned for 5 years from playing football in certain jurisdictions for pushing referee Yuichi Nishimura in a 2008 African Cup of Nations match against Egypt. A teammate and the Angolan team as a whole were also banned from certain areas for 5 years.

== National team statistics ==
Angola national team
Year	Apps	Goals
2004	8	1
2005	4	0
2006	3	1
2007	2	1
2008	7	0
2009	1	0
Total	25	4

=== International goals ===
Scores and results list Angola's goal tally first.

No	Date	Venue	Opponent	Score	Result	Competition
1.	31 March 2004	Prince Moulay Abdellah Stadium, Rabat, Morocco	Morocco	1–3	1–3	Friendly
2.	23 May 2004	Stade des Martyrs, Kinshasa, DR Congo	DR Congo	3–1	3–1	Friendly
3.	29 January 2006	Cairo International Stadium, Cairo, Egypt	Togo	3–2	3–2	2006 Africa Cup of Nations
4.	2 June 2007	Cicero Stadium, Asmara, Eritrea	Eritrea	1–1	1–1	2008 Africa Cup of Nations qualification
