= Jusmadi =

Indonesian footballer

Personal information
- Full name: Jusmadi
- Date of birth: 19 October 1983 (age 43)
- Place of birth: Bontang, Indonesia
- Height: 1.66 m (5 ft 5 1/2 in)
- Position: Midfielder

Senior career*
Years	Team	Apps	(Gls)
2004–2008	Bontang FC	78	(2)
2008–2010	Pelita Jaya	47	(4)
2010–2013	Persebaya Surabaya	65	(2)
2013–2016	Persela Lamongan	66	(2)
2016–2018	Gresik United	23	(1)
- * Club domestic league appearances and goals as of 25 October 2014

Jusmadi (born 19 October 1983) is an Indonesian former footballer.

== Career ==
=== Persib Bandung ===
In 2009, he played for Persib Bandung in the Indonesia Super League in 2009–2010 Season.

=== Persela Lamongan ===
In 2014, he played for Persela Lamongan in the 2014 Indonesia Super League.

=== Gresik United ===
In September 2016, 18th season, he was loaned to Gresik United from Persela Lamongan.
