= Ku Kyung-hyun =

South Korean footballer (born 1981)

Ku Kyung-Hyun
Personal information
- Full name: Ku Kyung-Hyun (구경현)
- Date of birth: April 30, 1981 (age 45)
- Place of birth: South Korea
- Height: 1.81 m (5 ft 11 in)
- Position: Midfielder

Senior career*
Years	Team	Apps	(Gls)
2003–2008	FC Seoul	10	(0)
2006–2007	→ Gwangju Sangmu (Military service)	32	(1)
2009–2010	Jeju United	22	(0)
2010–2011	Tangerang Wolves	16	(2)
- * Club domestic league appearances and goals

Ku Kyung-Hyun (born April 30, 1981) is a South Korean former football player who since 2009 has played for Jeju United FC. He formerly played for FC Seoul and Gwangju Sangmu.
