= Jardel Santana =

Brazilian footballer

Personal information
- Full name: Jardel Santana da Silva
- Date of birth: 10 December 1980 (age 45)
- Place of birth: Natal, Rio Grande do Norte, Brazil
- Height: 1.72 m (5 ft 7 1/2 in)
- Position: Midfielder

Senior career*
Years	Team	Apps	(Gls)
2006–2008	Persma Manado	32	(8)
2008–2009	Persisam	21	(11)
2009–2010	Sete de Setembro Esporte Clube	8	(1)
2010–2011	Manado United	18	(7)
- * Club domestic league appearances and goals

Jardel Santana da Silva (born 10 December 1978 in Natal, Rio Grande do Norte, Brazil) is a Brazilian former footballer. He normally plays as a midfielder, and is a former player for Persisam, Persma Manado and Manado United.

== Honours ==
Persisam

- Liga Indonesia Premier Division: 2008–09
