= Cristian Febre =

Chilean footballer and manager (born 1983)

Personal information
- Full name: Cristian Alejandro Febre Santis
- Date of birth: 10 December 1980 (age 45)
- Place of birth: La Florida, Chile
- Height: 1.89 m (6 ft 2 in)
- Position: Defender

Team information
- Current team: Santiago City (manager)

Youth career
- Audax Italiano

Senior career*
Years	Team	Apps	(Gls)
1998–2004	Audax Italiano	89	(7)
2005	Deportes La Serena	1	(0)
2006	Universidad de Concepción	5	(0)
2007–2008	Santiago Morning	43	(2)
2009	Coquimbo Unido	32	(2)
2010	Unión Temuco	15	(1)
2011	Real Mataram	12	
2011	Persiraja Banda Aceh	8	(1)
2012	PSM Makassar	6	
2012	Técnico Universitario	21	(0)
2013–2014	PSM Makassar	1	
2015	Bali United	0	(0)

Managerial career
- 2018–2021: Santiago Morning (youth)
- 2022: Santiago City
- 2023: Deportes Colina
- 2023: Santiago City
- 2024–2025: Santiago Morning (youth)
- 2025: Santiago Morning
- 2026–: Santiago City
- * Club domestic league appearances and goals

Cristian Alejandro Febre Santis (born 10 December 1980) is a Chilean football manager and former footballer who played for clubs in Chile, Indonesia and Ecuador. He is the current manager of Santiago City.

== Managerial career ==
Febre began his career as the manager of the Santiago Morning youth system, winning the 2019 National Championship at under-17 level. In 2022, he became the manager of Santiago City FC, a new club based in Las Condes, Santiago, in the Tercera B, the fifth division of the Chilean football.

In 2023, he joined Deportes Colina in the Tercera A. He briefly returned to Santiago City in September of the same year.

After leading Santiago Morning in 2025, Febre returned to Santiago City for the 2026 season in the Segunda División Profesional de Chile.

== Honours ==
=== Manager ===
Santiago Morning U17

- Campeonato Nacional Fútbol Joven: 2019
