= Benoît Lang =

Luxembourgish footballer

Personal information
- Date of birth: 19 December 1983 (age 42)
- Place of birth: Metet, Cameroon
- Height: 1.82 m (6 ft 0 in)
- Position: Defender

Senior career*
Years	Team	Apps	(Gls)
2002–2004	Swift Hesperange	27	(2)
2004–2005	CS Oberkorn	18	(1)
2005–2006	CS Grevenmacher	13	(0)
2006–2007	F91 Dudelange	10	(0)
2007–2010	CS Fola Esch	19	(0)
2010–2011	FC Jeunesse Canach	18	(0)
2011–2013	Persema Malang	26	(1)
2013–2016	US Schluein Ilanz		
2018–2019	Jeunesse Useldange		

International career^{‡}
2004	Luxembourg U19	1	(0)
	Luxembourg U21	13	(0)
2005–2008	Luxembourg	9	(0)
- * Club domestic league appearances and goals as of 27 June 2023 ‡ National team caps and goals as of 14 September 2009

Benoît Lang (born 19 December 1983) is a former Luxembourg professional football player of Cameroonian descent.
