= Bandung F.C. =

Defunct Indonesian football club

- Full name: Bandung Football Club
- Nicknames: Laskar Siliwangi (Siliwangi Warriors)
- Founded: 24 October 2010; 15 years ago
- Dissolved: 20 August 2011; 14 years ago
- Stadium: Siliwangi Stadium
- Capacity: 25,000
- League: Liga Primer Indonesia
Home colours	Away colours

Bandung Football Club was an Indonesian football club based in Bandung, West Java. The club played in Liga Primer Indonesia until the competition was halted and became defunct in 2011 when it was acquired and merged into Persiba Bantul.

== History ==
=== Founding ===
The club was first revealed on 24 October 2010 during the Liga Primer Indonesia launch at Semarang. Mohamad Kusnaeni was the founder and served as CEO of the club through the company PT Bandung Indonesia Golsport (PT BIG) with former Persikab club manager Mohamad Mughni also involved. Squad training began on 15 November after the club held player trials to fill the squad. After being involved in the early squad building, Nandar Iskandar was officially appointed as their first head coach on a one-year deal. The club held its proper unveiling on 26 December at Bandung with their logo and players revealed. The club had several alternative names lined up before keeping the Bandung F.C. name instead.

=== Liga Primer Indonesia season ===
On 10 January 2011, Bandung F.C. played its first Liga Primer Indonesia match, away to Persebaya 1927 at Gelora 10 November Stadium which resulted in a 2–1 defeat where Yudo Prasetyo scored the club's first goal in the 82nd minute courtesy of a header. Their first home fixture also ended in defeat as Persibo beat them 1–0. After the two defeats, the club signed former Aston Villa and England midfielder Lee Hendrie on a two-year deal for a reported wage of US$550,000 per year to help improve performances and boost the club's profile. Wins would not come until a 5–0 away defeat to Bogor Raya saw Nandar Iskandar temporarily removed from the head coach role before being sacked on 28 March. His assistant, Budiman Yunus took over as caretaker and was planned to remain in the role until the first half of the season ends. Budiman's first match in the role saw the club recorded its first-ever victory in the league, a 1–0 win over Minangkabau. After 18 matches, the club were 15th in the league on 16 points when the league was halted.

=== Verification issues and acquisition by Persiba Bantul ===
On 15 August 2011, Liga Primer Indonesia was officially abandoned as its clubs were rushing to meet requirements for the new professional season run under PSSI jurisdiction. Bandung F.C. tried to meet them all however certain requirements, such as a structured youth system and stadium infrastructure, were difficult to fulfill immediately and they could not find a nearby club to partner up with. The club was effectively dissolved on 20 August when Persiba Bantul acquired the club and moved them to Bantul to pass verification for the 2011–12 Indonesian Premier League.

== Crest, colours, and support ==
The crest of Bandung F.C. consists of a tiger head facing towards the right with the club name placed above it while a football and the founding year was placed below. A prior rendition of the crest had a forward-facing tiger head with five vertical stripes placed behind the football.

The club played in light blue to distinguish itself from fellow Bandung club Persib while staying close to its roots and their supporters refer to themselves as "Baraya".

== Stadium ==
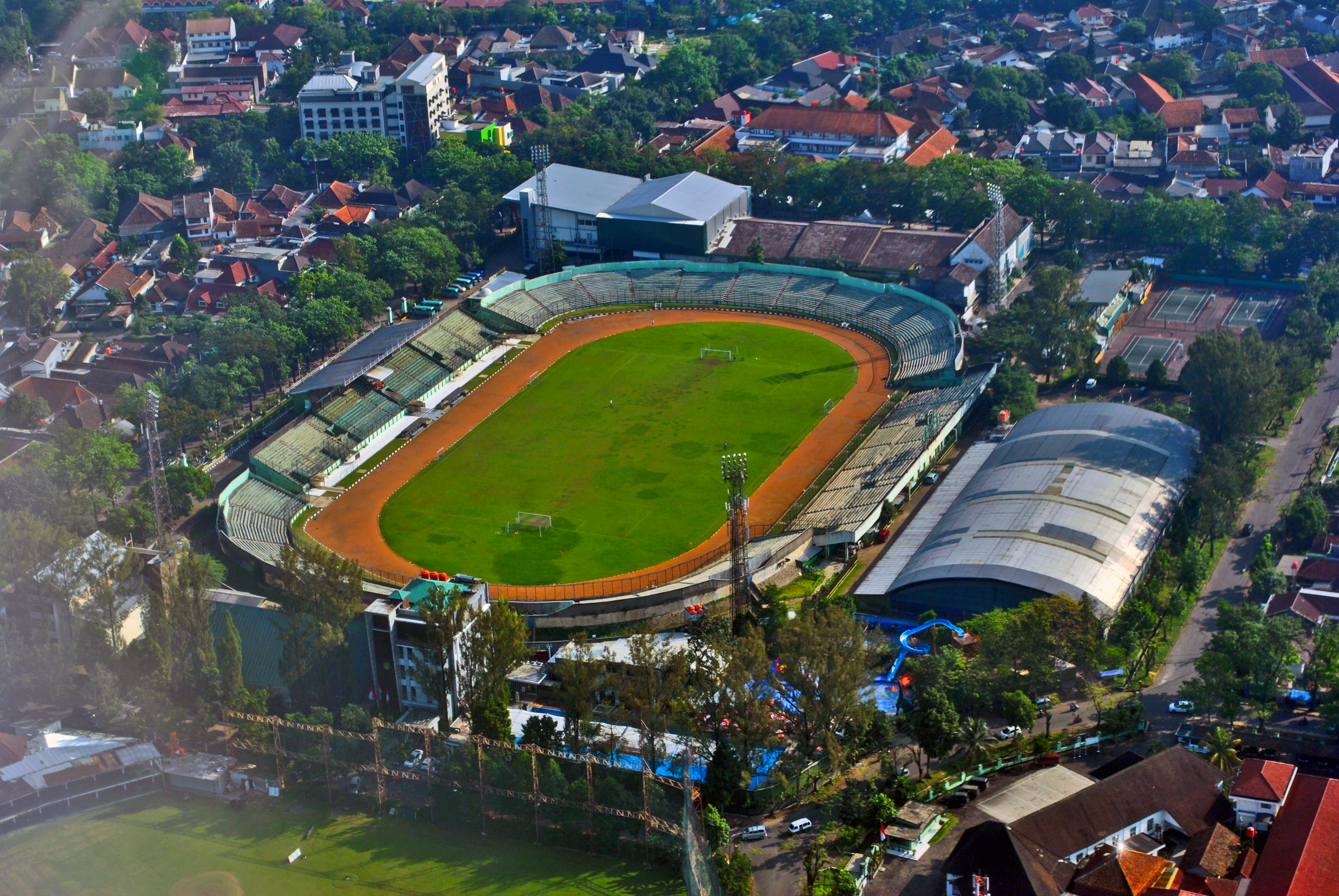
Siliwangi Stadium in 2014

Bandung F.C. played its home games at Siliwangi Stadium having acquired permission to play in it for the 2011 season. The stadium itself partially inspired the club's nickname, Laskar Siliwangi. The club's inaugural home match against Persibo had to be relocated to Mashud Wisnusaputra Stadium in Kuningan after being delayed by five days and clashing with a Persib match on the next day. The club also held talks of possibly using Sangkuriang Stadium in Cimahi with renovations in mind.

== Head coaches ==
Years	Coach
2010–11	(Indonesia) Nandar Iskandar
2011	(Indonesia) Budiman Yunus

== See also ==
- Bandung F.C. players
