= Guillermo Imhoff =

Argentine footballer

Personal information
- Full name: Guillermo Luis Imhoff
- Date of birth: October 11, 1982 (age 44)
- Place of birth: San Jerónimo Norte, Argentina
- Height: 1.86 m (6 ft 1 in)
- Position: Defender

Senior career*
Years	Team	Apps	(Gls)
2002–2006	Colón de Santa Fe	14	(1)
2004–2005	→ Huracán (TA) (loan)	12	(0)
2005–2006	→ Gimnasia de Jujuy (loan)	14	(0)
2006–2007	Colón de Santa Fe	5	(0)
2007–2008	Wacker Innsbruck	7	(0)
2009–2010	Wilstermann	32	(2)
2010–2011	FC Sion	4	(0)
2011–2012	Bali De Vata FC	18	(1)
- * Club domestic league appearances and goals

Guillermo Sergio Imhoff (born October 11, 1982) is an Argentine football player. The central defender last played for Bali De Vata FC.

== Club career ==
Imhoff started his career playing in the Argentine Primera, where he had spells with Colón de Santa Fe, Huracán de Tres Arroyos and Gimnasia de Jujuy.

He made his debut in the First Division with Colón de Santa Fe on July 5, 2007, scoring the loan goal in a 1–0 victory over Vélez Sársfield. In 2005, he was loaned to Huracán de Tres Arroyos and subsequently to Gimnasia de Jujuy. After gaining experience with those clubs, Imhoff returned to Colón. In 2006, he suffered a serious knee injury which kept him out of action for many months. In 2007, he was loaned to Austrian club Fußballclub Wacker Innsbruck. After two years in Europe, Imhoff received an offer from Bolivian club Jorge Wilstermann and in January 2009 he signed with the aviadores. In January 2010 turned back to Europe and signed for FC Sion a two-and-a-half-year deal.

== Personal life ==
Born in Argentina, Imhoff is of Swiss descent through his father.
