= Emanuel de Porras =

Argentine footballer

Personal information
- Full name: Emanuel Matías De Porras
- Date of birth: 16 October 1981 (age 45)
- Place of birth: Cutral Có, Argentina
- Height: 1.78 m (5 ft 10 in)
- Position: Forward

Senior career*
Years	Team	Apps	(Gls)
2001–2002	Ferro Carril Oeste	8	(0)
2002–2003	Huracán	2	(1)
2003–2004	Ferro Carril Oeste	21	(10)
2004–2006	Persija Jakarta	36	(21)
2006–2007	PSIS Semarang	54	(23)
2007	Benevento	17	(1)
2007–2009	Durazno	6	(2)
2009–2010	Flandria	32	(13)
2010–2011	Acassuso	16	(0)
2011–2012	Jakarta FC 1928	27	(11)
2012–2013	Tristán Suárez	16	(2)
2013	Negeri Sembilan		
2014	Atlético Bucaramanga	30	(6)
2016–2018	Sportivo Barracas	48	(17)
2018–2019	Sportivo Italiano	10	(6)
- * Club domestic league appearances and goals

Emanuel Matías de Porras (born 16 October 1981) is a former Argentine footballer who played as a forward.

De Porras also played for Benevento in Italy and clubs in his native Argentina, such as Ferro Carril Oeste, Huracán, Flandria and Acassuso, as well as in Indonesia for PSIS Semarang, Persija Jakarta and Persija IPL (Jakarta FC), Uruguay for Durazno, Malaysia for Negeri Sembilan and Colombia for Atlético Bucaramanga.

== Honours ==
PSIS Semarang

- Liga Indonesia Premier Division runner up: 2006
