= Diego Bogado =

Argentine association football player

Personal information
- Full name: Diego Ivan Bogado
- Date of birth: February 23, 1986 (age 40)
- Place of birth: Buenos Aires, Argentina
- Height: 1.72 m (5 ft 7 1/2 in)
- Position: Centre midfielder

Youth career
- 1996 – 2006: River Plate

Senior career*
Years	Team	Apps	(Gls)
2006–2011	River Plate	34	(4)
2011–2012	Bogor Raya F.C.	18	(5)
2012–2013	PS Mojokerto Putra	36	(14)
2013–2014	Treviso	25	(2)
- * Club domestic league appearances and goals

Diego Ivan Bogado (born 23 February 1986, in Buenos Aires) is an Argentine footballer who plays as a midfielder.

== Club career ==
Bogado began his career in 1996 on the youth side for Club Atlético River Plate and was promoted in 2006 to the senior side. He served as a sparring partner in the senior squad under the command of coach Marcelo Bielsa in the Copa América in Peru. He made his professional debut in Argentina's first division playing for River Plate, where he played through 2010. After sixteen years, in March 2011, he left Club Athético River Plate and joined Bogor Raya F.C. With 12 games played, he is one of the most valuable players of Indonesia football.
