= Juan Manuel Cortés =

Argentine footballer (born 1980)

Personal information
- Date of birth: 20 November 1980 (age 45)
- Place of birth: Quilmes, Buenos Aires, Argentina
- Height: 1.80 m (5 ft 11 in)
- Position: Forward

Senior career*
Years	Team	Apps	(Gls)
2000–2002	Belgrano de Córdoba	3	(0)
2002–2005	Racing de Córdoba	43	(7)
2005–2006	San Martín de Tucumán	37	(14)
2006–2007	Santamarina de Tandil	28	(7)
2007–2008	Tiro Federal	6	(0)
2008–2009	Unión de Sunchales	25	(13)
2009	Coquimbo Unido	7	(0)
2010	9 de Julio	10	(1)
2010	Central Norte		
2011–2012	Batavia Union	18	(13)
2012–2013	Boca Río Gallegos	19	(4)
- * Club domestic league appearances and goals

Juan Manuel Cortés (born 20 November 1980) is an Argentine former professional footballer who played as forward.
