= Fernando Soler (footballer) =

Argentine footballer and coach

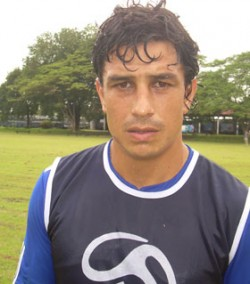

Personal information
- Full name: Fernando Gaston Soler
- Date of birth: February 24, 1978 (age 48)
- Place of birth: Buenos Aires, Argentina
- Height: 1.81 m (5 ft 11 1/2 in)
- Position: Striker

Senior career*
Years	Team	Apps	(Gls)
1997–1999	Lanús	14	(2)
1999–2000	Arsenal de Sarandi	17	(3)
2000–2001	San Martín de San Juan	38	(16)
2001–2002	Jeju United	13	(8)
2002–2003	Gimnasia y Esgrima (CU)	15	(1)
2003–2004	Persipura Jayapura	24	(14)
2004–2005	Sportivo Desamparados	3	(0)
2005–2006	Persibom Bolaang Mongondow	22	(6)
2006–2007	Club Atletico Temperley	17	(5)
2007–2008	Gimnasia y Esgrima de Jujuy	14	(2)
2008–2009	Platense	8	(1)
2009–2010	Club Atletico Temperley	9	(8)
2010–2011	Perez Zeledon	21	(5)
2011	Real Mataram	18	(13)
2011–2013	Persebaya Surabaya	34	(18)
2013–2014	Persiba Balikpapan	12	(4)
2014–2015	Borneo	23	(15)

Managerial career
- 2017–2018: Persib Bandung (assistant)
- 2019–2021: Borneo (assistant)
- * Club domestic league appearances and goals as of 17:09, 7 December 2014 (UTC)

Fernando Gaston Soler (born February 24, 1978) is an Argentine former football player who plays as a striker. Since 2010, he has held a CONMEBOL A coaching license.

== Coaching career ==
On December 7, 2014, he became the coach assistant for Arcan Iurie in Pusamania Borneo.
