= Medan Chiefs =

Indonesian football club

- Full name: Medan Chiefs
- Nickname: Kuda Terbang (en: The Flying Horses)
- Founded: 2010
- Dissolved: 2011
- Ground: Boerhanuddin Siregar Stadium, Lubuk Pakam (15.000)
- Owner: (Indonesia) Sihar Sitorus
- Coach: (Germany) Jörg Steinebrunner
- League: Liga Primer Indonesia
- 2011: 5

Medan Chiefs is one of the leading football clubs in Indonesia. Based in Medan, North Sumatra, Medan Chiefs chose Deli Serdang as its home ground. The team plays in the Liga Primer Indonesia. The club is under the management of Mr.Sihar Sitorus, a football enthusiast and businessman. He also manages the other football club from Medan, Pro Titan FC which plays in the Liga Indonesia Premier Division.

== Current squad ==
Note: Flags indicate national team as defined under FIFA eligibility rules; some limited exceptions apply. Players may hold more than one non-FIFA nationality.

No.	Pos.	Nation	Player
1	GK	IDN	Ahmad Jalalludin
2	GK	IDN	Muhammad Halim
3	GK	IDN	Oky Adiputra
4	DF	IDN	Risman Maidullah
17	DF	BRA	Pablo Augusto Da Lima
5	MF	GER	Hendrik Helmke
6	DF	IDN	Saralim Souwahu
7	DF	IDN	Mone Lohy
8	DF	IDN	Aun Carbiny (C)
18	MF	BRA	Carlos Alberto Dias

No.	Pos.	Nation	Player
9	DF	IDN	Risman Maidullah
10	FW	AUS	Ricardo Da Silva
11	MF	CHI	Luis Eduardo Hicks
12	MF	FRA	Kevin Yann
13	MF	IDN	Rahmat Rifai
14	FW	MAR	Laakkad Abdelhadi
15	FW	IDN	Abdul Madjid
16	FW	IDN	Faisol Arif
19	FW	BRA	Louis Anderson Pereyra
99	FW	SDN	Ablahu Naiholo Ges

== Coaching staff ==
Position	Staff
Head Coach	(Germany) Jorg Peter Steinebruner
Assistant Head Coach	(Indonesia) Amran
Fitness Coach	(Malaysia)
Goalkeeping Coach	(Indonesia) Danny Pasla
