= Andrew Barisic =

Australian footballer (born 1986)

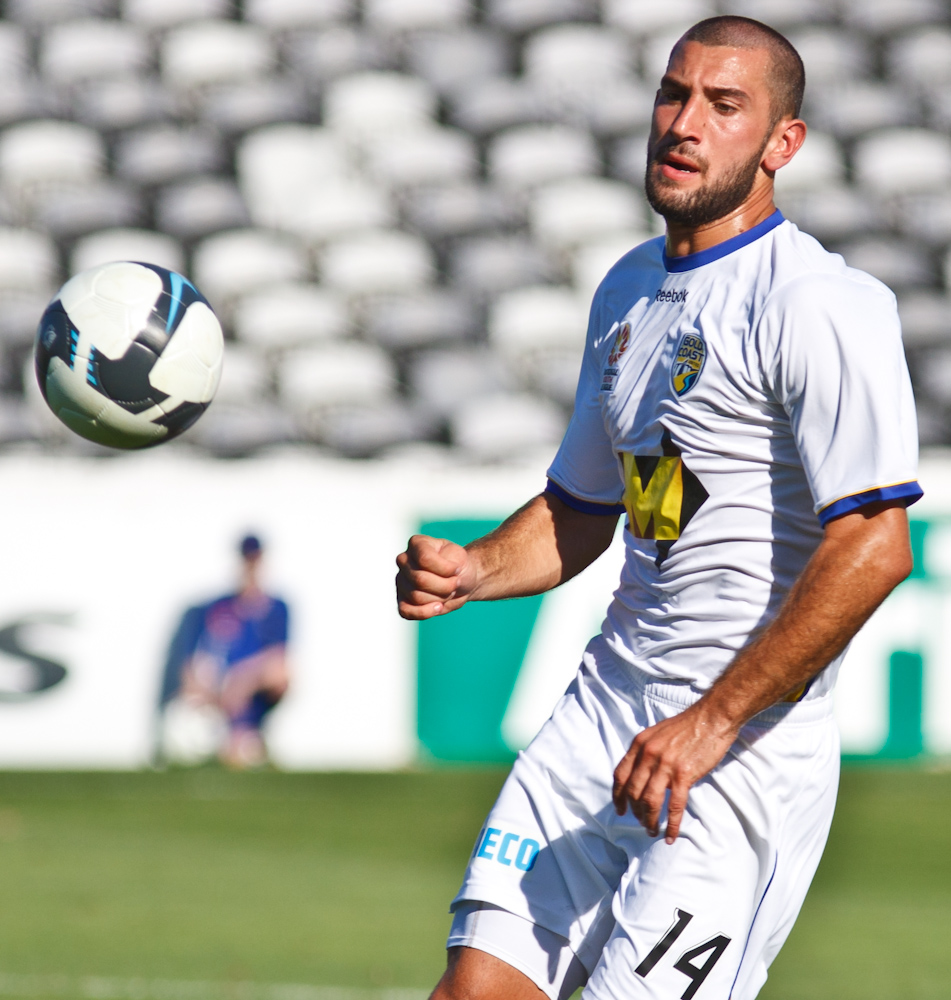
- Barisic in 2010

Personal information
- Date of birth: 22 March 1986 (age 40)
- Place of birth: Canberra, Australia
- Position: Forward

Team information
- Current team: Wangaratta City

Youth career
- 2002–2003: ACTAS
- 2003: Canberra FC

Senior career*
Years	Team	Apps	(Gls)
2005–2006	Melbourne Knights	40	(9)
2006–2007	Arminia Hannover	22	(1)
2007	SV Schermbeck	1	(0)
2007–2008	Melbourne Knights	21	(19)
2009–2011	Gold Coast United	17	(2)
2011–2012	Persebaya 1927	18	(8)
2012	Arema	26	(5)
2013	East Bengal	25	(11)
2013	Melbourne Knights	8	(7)
2013–2014	South China	7	(6)
2014	Kerala Blasters	11	(0)
2015	Melbourne Knights	14	(9)
2015–2016	Eastern	13	(7)
2017–2019	Gold Coast Knights		
2019	Wangaratta City		
- * Club domestic league appearances and goals as of 27 October 2020

Andrew Barisic (Croatian: [bǎriʃitɕ] BAH-reesh-ich; born 22 March 1986) is an Australian former soccer player.

== Club career ==
Born in Canberra, Barisic began his career in 2002 with the ACTAS before moving to Canberra Deakin in July 2003. In January 2004 he signed his first professional contract with Melbourne Knights, then left in the summer of 2006 for Europe and signed a contract for Germany-based Oberliga Nord club, Arminia Hannover.

On 13 December 2007 he signed with his former club Melbourne Knights in the Victorian Premier League. He impressed regularly, becoming a key member of their squad and scoring 19 goals in 21 games in the 2008 season.

=== Gold Coast United ===
On 10 December 2008 he was signed by Gold Coast United on a one-year contract. At Gold Coast United he made six appearances and scored one goal in his first season there. He was signed on for one further year. In his second season at GCU, he made 11 appearances and again scored one goal.

=== Persebaya 1927 ===
After leaving Gold Coast, "Bara" signed for Indonesian side Persebaya Surabaya in the Indonesian Premier League. He did very well there, scoring 11 in 14 games.

=== Arema Malang ===
He then signed for another Indonesia Super League side, this time Arema Cronus F.C., where he managed 8 goals in 15 appearances.

=== East Bengal ===
Barisic signed for East Bengal on 10 January 2013. He then made his debut for East Bengal on 25 January 2013, coming on as a 59th-minute substitute for Manandeep Singh, against Pune F.C. at the Balewadi Sports Complex in which East Bengal won 2–1. On 3 April 2013, he scored brace in 2013 AFC Cup against Singaporean opponent Tampines Rovers in group stage match. He again scored in same competition against a Vietnamese opponent Xuan Thanh Saigon in last group stage match, after winning that match East Bengal tops the group and qualified for the knockout stage of AFC Cup. On 8 May, he scored his 1st goal in the 2012–13 I-League in a 6–0 win over United Sikkim F.C. He ended his one-year stint with East Bengal with 15 goals in 22 matches.

=== Return to Melbourne Knights ===
He returned to Melbourne Knights for their 2013 VPL campaign, while the majority of the rest of Asia was in off-season. He managed 7 goals in 8 games in his third stint with the Knights.

=== South China ===
On 31 December 2013, Barisic signed for South China. At South China, Barisic managed 13 goals in 18 appearances, 6 in the Hong Kong Premier League, 2 in AFC Qualification and 1 in the Senior Challenge Shield.

=== Kerala Blasters FC ===
Barisic then signed for newly formed Kerala Blasters FC in the newly formed Indian Super League. In the ISL side, Barisic managed 11 appearances in which Kerala came 2nd.

=== Return to Melbourne Knights ===
Barisic returned for the 4th time to Melbourne Knights in January 2015 scoring 12 goals in 16 games.

=== Eastern Sports Club ===
On 1 July 2015 Andrew Signed with Hong Kong Premier League Side Eastern.

== Club statistics ==
Appearances and goals by club, season and competition
Club	Division	League			Cup		Continental		Other		Total	
Club	Division	Division	Apps	Goals	Apps	Goals	Apps	Goals	Apps	Goals	Apps	Goals
Arema	2011–12	Indonesia Super League	15	8	0	0	8	0	—		15	8
East Bengal	2012–13	I-League	7	1	5	2	7	3	—		22	15
South China	2013–14	Hong Kong First Division League	7	6	4	3	7	4	—		18	13
Kerala Blasters FC	2014	Indian Super League	8	0	—		—		—		8	0
Eastern	2015–16	Hong Kong Premier League	13	7	12	5	—		—		25	12
Career total			50	22	21	10	22	7	—		88	48

== Honours ==
=== Gold Coast Knights ===
- Gold Coast Premier League Premiership: 2017, 2018
- Gold Coast Premier League Championship: 2018

=== Individual ===
- Gold Coast Premier League Golden Boot: 2017
