= Real Mataram =

Indonesian football club

- Full name: Real Mataram Football Club
- Nickname: The Royals
- Founded: 2010
- Dissolved: 2011
- Ground: Maguwoharjo Stadium
- Capacity: 30.000
- Chairman: (Indonesia) Erik Irawan Pujoadi
- Manager: (Indonesia) Bangun Bawono
- Coach: (Argentina) José Basualdo
- League: Liga Primer Indonesia
- 2011: 16
- Website: http://realmataramfc.com
Home colours

Real Mataram FC was a professional Indonesian football club based in Yogyakarta, SR Yogyakarta. The team were played in Liga Primer Indonesia. In the mid-season, they found themselves in 16th in the league, below their early season target. A massive player reformation has been carried out, in which twelve player including two foreign player terminated from their contracts. There are indications that second reformation have been planned, and Real Mataram are now sought to obtain local players from Special Region of Jogjakarta's Liga Indonesia Premier Division clubs.

== Team officials ==
Role	Name
CEO	(Indonesia) Erik Irawan Pujoadi
Manager	(Indonesia) Bangun Bawono
Assistant manager	(Indonesia) Kusnadi
Head coach	(Argentina) Jose Basualdo
Coach Assistant	(Argentina) Cristian Armendariz
Coach Assistant	(Indonesia) Djoko Irianto

== Last squad ==
Note: Flags indicate national team as defined under FIFA eligibility rules; some limited exceptions apply. Players may hold more than one non-FIFA nationality.

No.	Pos.	Nation	Player
2	DF	CHI	Cristian Febre
3	MF	IDN	Jajang Hasan
5	DF	IDN	Nandri Eka S
7	FW	IDN	Supriyanto S
8	MF	IDN	Zaenal Abidin
9	FW	ARG	Fernando Gaston Soler
11	FW	IDN	Reza Aditya
13	MF	IDN	Ali Machrus
14	DF	IDN	Dedik Susanto

No.	Pos.	Nation	Player
15	FW	JPN	Irfan Khoirul Munoz
18	MF	IDN	Bisri Mustofa
22	MF	IDN	Doni Ikhsan
24	DF	IDN	Miftachul Chamli
25	MF	IDN	Eko Prasetyo
27	FW	CHI	Patricio Jimenez
29	FW	IDN	Nurmansyah
--	MF	ARG	Juan Darío Batalla
33	MF	AUS	Adrian Caceres
