= Aceh United F.C. =

Indonesian football club

Aceh United
- Full name: Aceh United Football Club
- Nicknames: The Aceh Lion (Singa Aceh); Iskandar Muda Warrior (Laskar Iskandar Muda)
- Founded: 10 October 2010
- Dissolved: 2019 (merged with PS Timah Babel)
- Ground: Cot Gapu Stadium
- Capacity: 15,000
- 2018: Liga 2/2nd round, 4th in Group A
- Website: www.acehunited.com
Home colours	Away colours

Aceh United Football Club was an Indonesian football club based in Bireuen, Aceh, on the island of Sumatra.

== History ==
Aceh United was first formed in the city of Banda Aceh in 2010. At first, Aceh United followed the competition Liga Primer Indonesia although due to league dualism, it was disbanded.In 2017, they club started to rise again.

With Ansyari Lubis as the coach, they reached 3rd place in the 2017 Liga 3, and thus, won the promotion to Liga 2. They won the 3rd place after a 2–0 win over PSAD Balikpapan on 17 December 2017 at the Gelora Bumi Kartini Stadium, Jepara.

In 2019, the club merged with PS Timah BaBel to form BaBel United.

== Jersey and Sponsorships ==
Aceh United home jersey is orange with green end-strip, whilst the away jersey is white with orange end-strip. The kit supplier for 2018 season is Calci. Other sponsors for 2018 season are: The Light of Aceh and Bank Aceh.

== Supporters ==
Aceh United have a supporter community called the Poemeurah. The name is an Acehnese word means Sumatran elephant. Members of the Poemeurah get free entry ticket at the north tribune of Harapan Bangsa Stadium for Aceh United home matches.

== Honours ==
- Liga 3
  - Third-place: 2017
- Cawan Aceh Cup
  - Winner: 2018

== Past Seasons ==
Season	Div.	Tie.	Pos.
2011	Liga Primer Indonesia^{a}	-	Competition was suspended
2012–2016	-^{b}	-	-
2017	Liga 3	3	3rd place (promoted to Liga 2)
2018	Liga 2	2	Second round

Key

- Div. = Name of Division Played
- Tie. = Tier level in Indonesian league pyramid at the time of competition
- Pos. = Position in league

Notes

- ^a Liga Primer Indonesia was an Indonesian independent football league held only in 2011.
- ^b The club did not compete in any league after Liga Primer Indonesia was suspended in 2011. Until in 2017 they started to compete again from Liga 3 as the lowest-tier league.
