= Cendrawasih Papua F.C. =

Indonesian football club

- Full name: Cendrawasih Papua Football Club
- Nickname: The Golden Birds
- Founded: 2010
- Dissolved: 2011
- Ground: Mandala Stadium, Jayapura
- Capacity: 30.000
- Chairman: (Indonesia) Benny Jansenem
- Manager: (Germany) Uwe Erkenbrecher
- League: Liga Primer Indonesia
- 2011: 19

Cendrawasih Papua F.C. was an Indonesian football club based in Jayapura in the province of Papua. The team played in the Liga Primer Indonesia and was a founding member of the league.

== Team Officials ==
Role	Name
Chairman	(Indonesia) Benny Jansenem
Head Coach	(Germany) Uwe Erkenbrecher
Coach Assistant	(Indonesia) Abdon Rumabar
Coach Assistant	(Indonesia) Amos Makanway
Goalkeeper Coach	(Indonesia) Dominggus Rawar
