= Minangkabau F.C. =

Indonesian football club

- Full name: Minangkabau Football Club
- Nickname: Kerbau Minang (en: The Minang Buffalo)
- Founded: 2010
- Dissolved: 2011
- Ground: Haji Agus Salim Stadium, Padang
- Capacity: 20,000
- Coach: Divaldo Alves
- League: Liga Primer Indonesia
- 2011: 10
Home colours	Away colours

Minangkabau Football Club was an Indonesian football club based in Padang, West Sumatra. The team played in Liga Primer Indonesia.

== 2011 Squad ==
Note: Flags indicate national team as defined under FIFA eligibility rules; some limited exceptions apply. Players may hold more than one non-FIFA nationality.

No.	Pos.	Nation	Player
1	GK	IDN	M.Sukron
21	DF	IDN	Dedy F. Dengah
13	DF	IDN	Rivellino
3	DF	IDN	David Alhadi
19	DF	IDN	Ilham
4	DF	IDN	Ivam Agam
15	MF	IDN	Imran Hadi
16	MF	IDN	Agus Salim

No.	Pos.	Nation	Player
10	FW	ANG	Maurito
7	MF	BRA	Juninho
5	DF	ANG	David Kuagica
