= Bali Devata F.C. =

Indonesian football club

Bali Devata
- Full name: Bali Devata Football Club
- Nickname: Laskar Naga Banda
- Founded: 2010
- Dissolved: 2011
- Ground: Kapten I Wayan Dipta Stadium
- Capacity: 25,000
- League: Liga Primer Indonesia

Bali Devata Football Club was an Indonesian football club based in Gianyar, Bali. The team played in Liga Primer Indonesia. It then merged with Persires Rengat to form Persires Bali Devata FC.
