= Bintang Medan F.C. =

Indonesian football club

- Full name: Bintang Medan Football Club
- Nicknames: The Evening Stars; The Crocodiles of Sumatra
- Founded: 2010
- Dissolved: 2011
- Ground: Teladan Stadium, Medan
- Capacity: 15,000
- CEO: Dityo Pramono
- Manager: Vacant
- League: Liga Primer Indonesia
- 2011: 12
Home colours	Away colours

Bintang Medan Football Club, commonly referred to as Bintang Medan F.C. or Medan Bintang F.C., or simply Bintang Medan, was an Indonesian football club based in Medan, North Sumatra. This team plays in the Liga Primer Indonesia. This is the special team prepared for the Liga Primer Indonesia (LPI) event by the PSMS Medan club management.

== Supporters ==
Bintang Medan's supporters call themselves "Brigade of Medan Bintang (BOMB)" and "SMeCK Hooligan", who also become PSMS Medan's supporters.

== Kit supplier ==
- Uno (2011– )

== See also ==
- PSMS Medan
