= Persija Jakarta (IPL) =

Indonesian football club

Jakarta FC 1928
- Full name: Jakarta Football Club 1928
- Nickname: Macan Metro (Metro Tigers)
- Founded: 2010
- Dissolved: 2013
- Ground: Lebak Bulus Stadium
- Capacity: 25,000
- Owner(s): PT. Persija Jaya, PT. Persi Jakarta Raya
- Chairman: Hadi Basalamah
- Manager: Ardhi Tjahjoko
- Coach: Bambang Nurdiansyah
- League: Indonesian Premier League
- 2013: 16th
Home colours	Away colours

Jakarta Football Club 1928 was a professional association football club based in Jakarta, Indonesia which competed in the Indonesian Premier League (IPL).

In 2011, the club was illegally profiteering identity of Persija Jakarta (IPL) to compete in the Indonesian Premier League (IPL) and thus becoming the clone of Persija ISL that competed in the Indonesian Super League (ISL). Then, the court ruling on 23 October 2012 stated that they must to relinquish their claim to the name and identity of Persija Jakarta, because the dispute won by Persija ISL which the one that has the trademark rights of Persija Jakarta and has genuine legality that is continuous from the previous season, so Persija IPL used the name Jakarta F.C., in the 2013 Indonesian Premier League competition. After the IPL was disbanded, signifying the end of dualism in Indonesian football, the club became defunct on 24 March 2013.

The club's kits were supplied by Mitre.

== Season-by-season records ==
=== Past seasons ===
Season	League/Division	Tms.	Pos.	Piala Indonesia	AFC competition(s)	
2010–11	LPI	19	4	–	–	–
2011–12	Indonesian Premier League	12	9	Second round	–	–
2013	Indonesian Premier League	16	Season unfinished	–	–	–

Key

- Tms. = Number of teams
- Pos. = Position in league

== Last squad ==
Note: Flags indicate national team as defined under FIFA eligibility rules; some limited exceptions apply. Players may hold more than one non-FIFA nationality.

No.	Pos.	Nation	Player
2	DF	IDN	Wirya Kumandra
4	MF	IDN	Andrian Mardiansyah
5	DF	IDN	Arsela Tjong
6	DF	PAR	José Aníbal Ruiz
7	DF	IDN	Dani Prasetyo
9	FW	ARG	Emanuel de Porras
16	DF	IDN	Saripudin
12	DF	IDN	Anton Siregar
14	GK	IDN	Fachrur Rozi Ismail
15	MF	IDN	Yudi Wahyudi
17	MF	FRA	Konté Coulibaly
18	DF	IDN	Supriyanto
19	MF	IDN	Yana Mulyana

No.	Pos.	Nation	Player
22	MF	IDN	Syaiful Arif
25	MF	IDN	Hendro Edy Riyanto
28	MF	IDN	Yulian Hamzah
33	MF	IDN	Muhammad Shodiq
34	GK	IDN	Reno Andhika
37	MF	IDN	Bagus Ardiyan
40	MF	IDN	I Nyoman Mahardhika
45	FW	ANG	Paulo Gonçalves
57	FW	IDN	Sugianto
62	FW	IDN	Nyoman Sukarja
77	FW	IDN	Irawan Sucahyo
88	GK	IDN	Pratama Simanjuntak

== Team officials ==
Role	Name
Chairman	(Indonesia) Hadi Basalamah
Secretary	(Indonesia) Setiawan
Team manager	(Indonesia) Ardi Tjahjoko
Head coach	(Indonesia) Bambang Nurdiansyah
Fitness coach	(Indonesia) Lili Kurniadi
Goalkeeper coach	(Indonesia) Haryanto
Team doctor	(Indonesia) M. Faisal
