= Tangerang Wolves F.C. =

Indonesian football club

Tangerang Wolves FC
- Full name: Tangerang Wolves Football Club
- Nickname: Serigala Benteng (The Castle Wolves)
- Founded: September 2010
- Dissolved: 2011
- Ground: Benteng Stadium; Tangerang, Indonesia
- CEO: (Indonesia) Akmal Junaidi
- Head Coach: (Brazil) Paolo Camargo
- Coach: (Indonesia) Agus Suryanto
- League: Liga Primer Indonesia
- 2011: 18

Tangerang Wolves Football Club was an Indonesian football club based in Tangerang, Banten. The team played in the Liga Primer Indonesia.

== Current squad ==
Note: Flags indicate national team as defined under FIFA eligibility rules; some limited exceptions apply. Players may hold more than one non-FIFA nationality.

No.	Pos.	Nation	Player
—	GK	IDN	Arvin Naufal A.
—	DF	IDN	Yehezkiel
—	DF	IDN	Nurjati
—	MF	KOR	Ku Kyung-Hyen
—	FW	IDN	M. Azis Harahap
—	FW	IDN	Wachid Khafidin Agus
—	DF	BRA	Fernando Da Costa
—	MF	IDN	Imam Hanafi
—	MF	IDN	Salbi Muntono

No.	Pos.	Nation	Player
—	DF	IDN	Muhammad Dwi Cahyono
—	DF	IDN	Akmal Faizal
—	MF	IDN	Muhammad Ansorudin
—	GK	IDN	Rudy Ardiansyah
—	DF	IDN	Bambang Trisanjaya
—	MF	BRA	Victor Hugo
—	FW	BRA	Wallace Rodrigues Da Silva
—	FW	KOR	Park Chan Yong
—	MF	IDN	Prayoga Anugerah Nurachman
