= 2013 Indonesian Premier League =

Indonesian Premier League
- Season: 2013
- Champions: season unfinished
- Disqualified: Persema Malang; Persibo Bojonegoro; Jakarta FC; Persebaya Surabaya; Arema Indonesia
- Matches: 122
- Goals: 356 (2.92 per match)
- Top goalscorer: Edward Wilson (17 goals)
- Biggest home win: Persiba 7–1 PSIR; 28 April 2013
- Biggest away win: Persema 0–4 Persijap; 13 April 2013
- Highest scoring: Persiba 7–1 PSIR; 28 April 2013
- Longest winning run: Perseman Manokwari (5 games)
- Longest unbeaten run: Perseman Manokwari (5 games)
- Longest winless run: Jakarta FC (9 games)
- Longest losing run: Jakarta FC (7 games)

The 2013 Indonesian Premier League was the 2nd and final season of the Indonesian Premier League (IPL), a fully professional football competition as the shared top tier of the football league pyramid in Indonesia with the Indonesia Super League before the two leagues merged for the 2014 season. The season began on 16 February 2013. Semen Padang were the defending champions, having won their 1st league title .

== Teams ==
PSMS Medan were relegated during the end of the previous season. They were replaced by the best three teams (three group champions) from the 2011–12 Liga Indonesia Premier Division, Persepar Palangkaraya, Perseman Manokwari and Pro Duta FC.

Eleventh place Indonesian Premier League side Bontang FC managed to retain his place in the highest competition after finishing as champions of the play-offs.

Two Premier Division group runner-up last season side PSLS Lhokseumawe and PSIR Rembang managed promotion after finishing runner-up and third-place in the play-offs.

=== Stadium and locations ===
Team location

Club	City	Province	Stadium	Capacity	2011–12 season
Arema Indonesia	Malang	East Java	Gajayana	30,000	3rd Indonesia Premier League
Bontang FC	Bontang	East Kalimantan	Mulawarman	20,000	11th Indonesia Premier League
Persebaya 1927	Surabaya	East Java	Gelora Bung Tomo	50,000	2nd Indonesia Premier League Runners-up
Persema Malang	Malang	East Java	Gajayana	30,000	8th Indonesia Premier League
Perseman Manokwari	Manokwari	West Papua	Maguwoharjo	30,000	1st in Group 3 Premier Division
Persepar Palangkaraya	Palangkaraya	Central Kalimantan	Tuah Pahoe Stadium	7,000	1st in Group 2 Premier Division Champions
Persiba Bantul	Bantul	Yogyakarta	Sultan Agung	35,000	5th Indonesia Premier League
Persibo Bojonegoro	Bojonegoro	East Java	Letjen Haji Sudirman	15,000	4th Indonesia Premier League
Jakarta FC	Jakarta	Jakarta	Singaperbangsa	25,000	9th in Indonesia Premier League
Persijap Jepara	Jepara	Central Java	Gelora Bumi Kartini	25,000	10th in Indonesia Premier League
Persiraja Banda Aceh	Banda Aceh	Aceh	Harapan Bangsa	40,000	7th Indonesia Premier League
Pro Duta FC	Lubuk Pakam	North Sumatra	Baharuddin Siregar	15,000	1st in Group 1 Premier Division
PSIR Rembang	Rembang	Central Java	Krida Stadium	7,000	2nd in Group 2 Premier Division
PSLS Lhokseumawe	Lhokseumawe	Aceh	Tunas Bangsa Stadium	20,000	2nd in Group 1 Premier Division
PSM Makassar	Makassar	South Sulawesi	Andi Mattalatta	30,000	6th Indonesian Premier League
Semen Padang FC	Padang	West Sumatra	Haji Agus Salim	28,000	1st in Indonesian Premier League Champions

=== Personnel ===
Team	Coach^{1}	Captain
Arema Indonesia	Abdul Rahman Gurning	Legimin Raharjo
Bontang FC	Fachry Husaini	Ridwansyah
Persebaya 1927	Fabio Oliveira	Mat Halil
Persema Malang	Rudi Hariantoko	Agung Dwi Jaksono
Perseman Manokwari	Arcan Iurie	Marcio Souza
Persepar Palangkaraya	Edy Simon Badawi	Bima Sakti
Persiba Bantul	Sajuri Syahid	Ezequiel González
Persibo Bojonegoro	Gusnul Yakin	
Jakarta FC	Eduard Tjong	Cornelius Geddy
Persijap Jepara	Raja Isa	Evaldo Silva
Persiraja Banda Aceh	Maman Suryaman	Erik Saputra
Pro Duta FC	Dejan Antonić	Suyatno
PSIR Rembang	Kibnu Harto	Christian Lenglolo
PSLS Lhokseumawe	Nasrul Koto	Hendra Syahputra
PSM Makassar	Imran Amirullah (caretaker)	Syamsul Chaeruddin
Semen Padang FC	Jafri Sastra	Elie Aiboy

=== Coaching changes ===
==== Pre-season ====
Team	Outgoing coach	Manner of departure	Date of vacancy	Incoming coach	Date of appointment
Persijap Jepara	Sartono Anwar	Signed by Persisam Putra	August 2012	Riono Asnan	28 August 2012
Semen Padang	Suhatman Iman	Mutual consent	September 2012	Jafri Sastra	20 October 2012
Persiraja Banda Aceh	Herry Kiswanto	Signed by Persiba Balikpapan	18 December 2012	Maman Suryaman	26 February 2013

==== In season ====
Team	Outgoing coach	Manner of departure	Date of vacancy	Incoming coach	Date of appointment
Persema Malang	Slave Radovský	Resigned	4 April 2013	Rudi Hariantoko	4 April 2013
Persijap Jepara	Riono Asnan	Sacked	31 March 2013	Raja Isa	4 April 2013
Pro Duta	Roberto Bianchi	Sacked	31 May 2013	Ansyari Lubis (interim)	2 June 2013
PSM Makassar	Petar Segrt	Resigned	11 June 2013	Imran Amrullah (interim)	11 June 2013
Persebaya Surabaya	Ibnu Grahan	Resigned	June 2013	Fabio Oliveira	3 August 2013
Pro Duta	Ansyari Lubis	End of caretaker role	16 September 2013	Dejan Antonić	16 September 2013

== Foreign players ==
Club	Player 1	Player 2	Player 3	Asian player	Former players
Arema Indonesia	(Serbia) Marko Krasić	(Slovakia) Roman Chmelo			
Bontang F.C.	(Cameroon) César M'Boma	(Uganda) Jimmy Kidega		(Japan) Masahiro Fukasawa	
Jakarta F.C.					
Persebaya 1927	(Argentina) Fernando Soler	(Australia) Mario Karlović	(North Macedonia) Goran Gančev	(South Korea) Han Ji-ho	
Persema Malang	(Cameroon) Guy Mamoun	(Mali) Dramane Coulibaly			
Perseman Manokwari	(Brazil) Márcio Souza	(Bulgaria) Stanislav Zhekov	(Nigeria) Michael Onwatuegwu		
Persepar Palangkaraya	(Brazil) Antônio Teles	(Cameroon) Émile Mbamba	(Nigeria) George Oyedepo	(South Korea) Kim Sang-duk	(Brazil) William Teixeira
Persiba Bantul	(Argentina) Ezequiel González	(Brazil) Carlos Eduardo	(Liberia) Roberto Kwateh		
Persibo Bojonegoro	(Argentina) Marcelo Cirelli	(Liberia) Alexander Robinson		(South Korea) Han Ji-ho	(Argentina) Julio Alcorsé
Persijap Jepara	(Argentina) Julio Alcorsé	(Argentina) Walter Brizuela	(Brazil) Evaldo	(South Korea) Kim Yong-han	(Costa Rica) Víctor Coto
Persiraja Banda Aceh	(Croatia) Ivan Razumović				
Pro Duta F.C.	(Latvia) Deniss Romanovs	(Latvia) Ģirts Karlsons	(Spain) José Galán		
PSIR Rembang	(Cameroon) Christian Lenglolo	(Guinea) Mbemba Sylla	(Liberia) Esaiah Pello Benson		
PSLS Lhokseumawe	(Argentina) Carlos Sciucatti	(Guinea) Fassawa Camara	(Russia) Sergey Litvinov		
PSM Makassar	(Montenegro) Ilija Spasojević				(Montenegro) Mirko Spasojević
Semen Padang F.C.	(Argentina) Estebán Vizcarra	(Cameroon) David Pagbe	(Liberia) Edward Junior Wilson	(South Korea) Yoo Hyun-goo	

== League table ==
Pos	Team	Pld	W	D	L	GF	GA	GD	Pts	Qualification or relegation
1	Semen Padang	16	13	2	1	46	6	+40	41	Get wildcard to advance league verification and 2013 Premier League Final (Note: A PSSI extraordinary congress resulted in a decision to merge the two leagues into one in the 2014 season with a name Super League. Therefore Premier League (IPL) clubs would have 4 teams eligible to appear in the new league, the quota taken from the four best teams in the IPL 2013 season.)
2	Perseman Manokwari	19	12	3	4	39	12	+27	39	Advance to Play-off round
3	Pro Duta	19	11	4	4	33	11	+22	37	Advance to Play-off round
4	Persiba Bantul	18	11	2	5	41	21	+20	35	Advance to Play-off round
5	Persebaya 1927	18	10	4	4	35	19	+16	34	Disqualified from the league (Note: Persebaya 1927 and Arema Indonesia was disqualified as they did not meet the conditions for PSSI membership.)
6	PSM Makassar	18	10	2	6	27	12	+15	32	Advance to Play-off round
7	PSIR Rembang	20	9	4	7	33	42	−9	31	Advance to Play-off round
8	Persijap Jepara	19	9	3	7	32	16	+16	30	Advance to Play-off round
9	Persepar Palangkaraya	21	8	6	7	25	25	0	30	Advance to Play-off round
10	Persiraja Banda Aceh	19	7	4	8	23	28	−5	25	Advance to Play-off round
11	PSLS Lhokseumawe	19	7	4	8	29	34	−5	25	Advance to Play-off round
12	Arema Indonesia	18	5	2	11	19	42	−23	17	Disqualified from the league
13	Bontang FC	18	4	2	12	21	51	−30	14	Advance to Play-off round
14	Persema Malang	15	3	0	12	15	40	−25	9	Disqualified from the league (Note: Persibo Bojonegoro, Persema Malang and Jakarta FC were disqualified for walking out too many matches.)
15	Persibo Bojonegoro	15	2	1	12	6	39	−33	7	Disqualified from the league
16	Jakarta FC	15	1	1	13	11	37	−26	4	Disqualified from the league

Updated to match(es) played on 4 September 2013. Source: IPL Table
Rules for classification: 1) points; 2) goal difference; 3) number of goals scored.

== Results ==
Home \ Away	ARE	BON	PSBY	PSMA	PSMN	PPAR	PSBN	PSBO	JFC	PSJP	RAJ	PDFC	REM	PSLS	PSM	SPD
Arema Indonesia				3–1			1–3				2–1		2–2	0–0		
Bontang FC						3–0		3–0			1–1			3–2		
Persebaya Surabaya		5–0				2–1		5–1			0–0		5–2	4–2		
Persema Malang		4–1	0–1						5–2	0–4						
Perseman Manokwari				3–0		2–2						1–1	5–2		1–0	3–1
Persepar Palangkaraya	1–0				0–2		1–0								1–0	
Persiba Bantul				5–0							4–0		7–1	4–1		
Persibo Bojonegoro	0–3				0–1	0–0									2–0	
Jakarta FC						0–3		0–3				0–3				0–3
Persijap Jepara								4–0	5–0			0–2				0–0
Persiraja					0–0				2–0	1–0				1–0	0–1	
Pro Duta	2–0	3–0	1–1				0–0									0–2
PSIR		1–0	0–0	3–2					3–1	3–1						
PSLS Lhokseumawe					2–0				3–3	2–0					1–0	
PSM				3–0								2–0	5–1			0–1
Semen Padang	3–0	5–0	3–0				2–1									

Updated to match(es) played on 2 June 2013. Source: IPL Result
Legend: Blue = home team win; Yellow = draw; Red = away team win.

== Season statistics ==
=== Top scorers ===
Rank	Scorer	Club	Goals
1	Edward Wilson Junior	Semen Padang	18
2	Carlos Raul Sciucatti	PSLS Lhokseumawe	13
3	Christian Lenglolo	PSIR Rembang	12
4	Mario Karlovic	Persebaya 1927	10
5	Roberto Kwateh	Persiba Bantul	9
5	Rahmad Hidayat	Pro Duta FC	9
5	Andi Oddang	PSM Makassar	9
8	Kornelis Kaimu	Perseman Manokwari	8
8	Esteban Vizcarra	Semen Padang	8
10	Fernando Soler	Persebaya 1927	7
10	Émile Mbamba	Persepar Palangkaraya	7
10	Sansan Fauzi	Jakarta FC	7

Updated to games played on 4 September 2013.
Source: IPL Topscorer

== Play-off round ==
After the meeting on Wednesday, 2 October 2013 between PSSI and PT. Liga Prima Indonesia Sportindo and club participants Indonesian Premier League (IPL), they decided that the IPL competition was stopped and the entire first and second round scores were not recognized. Due to this on Thursday 3 October 2013 PSSI executive committee decided to hold a play-off to determine which club was eligible for the verification of 2014 Indonesia Super League club participants and also determine the champions of IPL 2013 season.

Ten clubs participated in the play-off. These were Persiraja Banda Aceh, PSLS Lhokseumawe, Pro Duta FC, Persijap Jepara, PSIR Rembang, Persiba Bantul, Bontang FC, PSM Makassar, Persepar Palangkaraya and Perseman Manokwari. Meanwhile, Persebaya 1927 and Arema Indonesia were disqualified for not being official members of the PSSI. While Semen Padang FC received a wildcard to qualify directly for the finals and 2014 leagues verification as the defending champion of last season and in the standings this season they were top of the standings.

As for the format of the play-off with the home tournament system, Jepara (Gelora Bumi Kartini) and Bantul (Sultan Agung Stadium) were appointed as the hosts. Play-offs were divided into two groups with five teams each, the top three teams of each group qualified for the following leagues verification. While the winner of each group qualified for the semi-finals of the play-offs, the winner advanced to the finals to face with Semen Padang to determine the champion of the 2013 Indonesian Premier League.

The play-off was originally scheduled to start on 16 October and finish on 2 November 2013.

=== Group stage ===
Group stage draw was made on Friday on 4 October 2013 at the headquarters of the Football Association of Indonesia. Among the group stage started on 16 October 2013 and finished on 25 October 2013.

==== Group K ====
Pos	Team	Pld	W	D	L	GF	GA	GD	Pts	Qualification or relegation
1	Pro Duta	4	3	1	0	14	1	+13	10	Advances to Semi-finals and qualified to 2014 leagues verification
2	PSM	4	3	0	1	11	2	+9	9	Qualified to 2014 leagues verification
3	Persijap Jepara	4	2	1	1	9	3	+6	7	Qualified to 2014 leagues verification
4	Bontang FC (R)	4	1	0	3	5	16	−11	3	Relegation to 2014 Premier Division
5	PSLS Lhokseumawe (R)	4	0	0	4	3	18	−15	0	Relegation to 2014 Premier Division

(R) Relegated
16 October 2013
15:00 WIB

PSLS Lhokseumawe	3–4	Bontang FC
Fassawa 48'; Zal Wandi 49'; Nanda 82'	Report	Achmad 1'; Kidega 3'; Hendri 16', 75'

Gelora Bumi Kartini, Jepara
Referee: Oki Dwi Putra
16 October 2013
19:30 WIB

Pro Duta FC	1–1	Persijap Jepara
Karlsons 25'	Report	Noor Hadi 86'

Gelora Bumi Kartini, Jepara
18 October 2013
15:00 WIB

Persijap Jepara	5–0	PSLS Lhokseumawe
Noor Hadi 43', 56', 90+2'; Alcorsé 70', 89'	Report

Gelora Bumi Kartini, Jepara
18 October 2013
19:00 WIB

PSM Makassar	0–1	Pro Duta FC
	Report	Karlsons 89'

Gelora Bumi Kartini, Jepara
20 October 2013
15:30 WIB

PSLS Lhokseumawe	0–3	PSM Makassar
	Report	Oddang 1'; Chaeruddin 2' (pen.); Rachmat 90+3'

Gelora Bumi Kartini, Jepara
20 October 2013
19:00 WIB

Bontang FC	0–3	Persijap Jepara
	Report	Junaedi 27'; Evaldo Silva 47' (pen.); Noor Hadi 65'

Gelora Bumi Kartini, Jepara
22 October 2013
15:30 WIB

PSM Makassar	6–1	Bontang FC
Oddang 1', 2'; Rachmat 49'; Chaeruddin 50', 63'; Syamsuddin 76'		Satriadi 74'

Gelora Bumi Kartini, Jepara
22 October 2013
19:00 WIB

Pro Duta FC	6–0	PSLS Lhokseumawe
Agus 16'; Karlsons 35', 49', 51'; Efendi 85'; Sajali 87'

Gelora Bumi Kartini, Jepara
24 October 2013
15:30 WIB

Persijap Jepara	0–2	PSM Makassar
		Evaldo Silva 44' (o.g.); Chaeruddin 86'

Gelora Bumi Kartini, Jepara
24 October 2013
19:00 WIB

Bontang FC	0–6	Pro Duta FC
		Agus 47'; Karlsons 48', 60'; Siregar 57'; Romanovs 72' (pen.); Hidayat 90'

Gelora Bumi Kartini, Jepara

==== Group L ====
Pos	Team	Pld	W	D	L	GF	GA	GD	Pts	Qualification or relegation
1	Persepar Palangkaraya	4	3	1	0	13	7	+6	10	Advances to Semi-finals and qualified to 2014 leagues verification
2	Persiba Bantul	4	2	1	1	10	6	+4	7	Qualified to 2014 leagues verification
3	Perseman Manokwari	4	2	1	1	9	7	+2	7	Qualified to 2014 leagues verification
4	PSIR (R)	4	1	1	2	11	13	−2	4	Relegation to 2014 Premier Division
5	Persiraja (R)	4	0	0	4	6	16	−10	0	Relegation to 2014 Premier Division

(R) Relegated
17 October 2013
15:30 WIB

Persiraja Banda Aceh	1–4	Persepar Palangkaraya
Fahrizal 90'	Report	Mbamba 18', 79'; Teles 31'; Basry 67'

Sultan Agung Stadium, Bantul
17 October 2013
19:00 WIB

PSIR Rembang	1–4	Persiba Bantul
Lenglolo 65' (pen.)	Report	Wirahadi 45+2'; Kwateh 49'; Ezequiel 54'; Ugik 90'

Sultan Agung Stadium, Bantul
19 October 2013
15:00 WIB

Persiba Bantul	4–2	Persiraja Banda Aceh
Ezequiel 2'; Wirahadi 9'; Eduardo Bizzaro 70'; Kwateh 75'	Report	Heriansyah 59'; Zikra 77'

Sultan Agung Stadium, Bantul
19 October 2013
19:00 WIB

Perseman Manokwari	2–2	PSIR Rembang
Latuperissa 41'; Márcio Souza 44'		Arifin 9', 90'

Sultan Agung Stadium, Bantul
21 October 2013
15:00 WIB

Persiraja Banda Aceh	0–3	Perseman Manokwari
		Márcio Souza 10', 25'; Valentino 86'

Sultan Agung Stadium, Bantul
21 October 2013
19:00 WIB

Persepar Palangkaraya	1–1	Persiba Bantul
Romi 30'		Manaji 36'

Sultan Agung Stadium, Bantul
23 October 2013
15:30 WIB

Perseman Manokwari	2–4	Persepar Palangkaraya
Kaimu 65', 87'		Mbamba 19', 76'; Kim Sang-Duk 51'; Paijo 90'

Sultan Agung Stadium, Bantul
23 October 2013
19:00 WIB

PSIR Rembang	5–3	Persiraja Banda Aceh
Lenglolo 4', 48', 90+2'; Ustaf 6', 16' (pen.)		Heriansyah 41'; Parnanda 42'; Fahrizal 90+3'

Sultan Agung Stadium, Bantul
25 October 2013
15:30 WIB

Persiba Bantul	1–2	Perseman Manokwari
Nurcahyo 20'		Latuperissa 69' (pen.); Kaimu 87'

Sultan Agung Stadium, Bantul
25 October 2013
19:00 WIB

Persepar Palangkaraya	4–3	PSIR Rembang
Mbamba 3'; Pasarela 5'; Pradana 55'; Basry 65'		Ranu Tri 42'; Ustaf 58' (pen.); Effendi 66'

Sultan Agung Stadium, Bantul

=== Knockout stage ===
The knockout stage started on 28 October and was scheduled to finish on 2 November 2013 in grand final match. However, three days before the start of the knockout stage on 25 October 2013, PSSI secretary-general Joko Driyono announced the cancellation of the 2013 IPL play-off final match, citing that the game was not a priority as the league competition was already finished, since it had been cancelled by PSSI. He elaborated that the main objective of the play-off was to determine seven teams that would join the new unified league in 2014, pursuant to a verification process. According to Joko, other agendas were not considered not a priority.

The cancellation meant that there was no league champion for the IPL's final season; rather, the winner of the semifinal match earned the title of 2013 IPL play-off champion. Three days after the announcement by PSSI, Pro Duta FC defeated Persepar Palangkaraya in the final IPL match that was ever played to win the title. It also solved a scheduling problem: Semen Padang was committed to play in a tournament in Vietnam from 25 October to 3 November, making it impossible for them to play in the final match that was scheduled for 2 November. Ultimately, Pro Duta and Persepar (along with Perseman) did not participate in the ISL as PSSI denied them licenses during the verification process.

Semi-finals
28 October – Bantul
Pro Duta FC	3
Persepar Palangkaraya	2

Final
2 November (cancelled)
Semen Padang
Pro Duta FC

==== Semi-finals ====
28 October 2013
15:30 WIB

Pro Duta FC	3–2	Persepar Palangkaraya
Hidayat 14'; Sajali 59'; Majid 67'		Kim Sang-Duk 28', 83' (pen.)

Sultan Agung Stadium, Bantul

==== Final ====
2 November 2013

Semen Padang	Cancelled	Pro Duta FC
