= List of Indonesia Super League hat-tricks =

This is a list of association football players who have scored three goals (a hat-trick) or more in a single match in the Indonesia Super League. The league, which started in 2008, is the top-tier of Indonesian league football replacing the Liga Indonesia Premier Division, thus transforming the competition into a double round-robin system. The first player to achieve the feat was Cristian Gonzáles, who scored three goals for Persik Kediri in a 4–0 victory over PSIS Semarang. To date, ten players have scored four goals in a match, and only three players have scored five goals in one game. Alex Martins is the player who has scored the most hat-tricks in Super League to date.

== Hat-tricks ==
Note
^{4}	Player scored four goals
^{5}	Player scored five goals
*	The home team

List of Indonesia Super League hat-tricks (2008–2015)
#	Player	Nationality	For	Against	Result	Date	Ref
1	Cristian Gonzáles	Uruguay	Persik Kediri*	PSIS Semarang	4–0	27 July 2008	
2	Bambang Pamungkas	Indonesia	Persija Jakarta*	PSIS Semarang	5−0	7 September 2008	
3	Boaz Solossa	Indonesia	Persipura Jayapura*	Persija Jakarta	6−0	9 October 2008	
4	Márcio Souza	Brazil	Persela Lamongan*	PKT Bontang	5−0	13 October 2008	
5	Greg Nwokolo	Nigeria	Persija Jakarta*	PKT Bontang	5−0	19 October 2008	
6	Zada	Brazil	PSMS Medan	Arema Malang*	3−4	23 October 2008	
7	Claude Ngon A Djam	Cameroon	Sriwijaya*	Arema Malang	4−0	8 February 2009	
8	Boakay Eddie Foday^{4}	Liberia	Persiwa Wamena*	PSIS Semarang	6−0	1 April 2009	
9	Alberto Gonçalves	Brazil	Persipura Jayapura*	PSM Makassar	5−0	7 May 2009	
10	Boaz Solossa	Indonesia	Persipura Jayapura	Persitara Jakarta Utara*	3−3	20 May 2009	
11	Cristian Gonzáles	Uruguay	Persib Bandung*	Deltras	6−1	30 May 2009	
12	Syamsul Chaeruddin	Indonesia	PSM Makassar	Deltras*	3−5	10 June 2009	
13	Talaohu Musafri	Indonesia	Persiba Balikpapan*	PSIS Semarang	5−0	10 June 2009	
14	Noor Hadi	Indonesia	Persijap Jepara*	Persitara Jakarta Utara	3−0	17 October 2009	
15	Andi Oddang	Indonesia	Persebaya Surabaya*	Persisam Putra	5−2	18 October 2009	
16	Korinus Fingkreuw	Indonesia	Persebaya Surabaya*	Persiwa Wamena	5−4	15 November 2009	
17	Saktiawan Sinaga	Indonesia	Persik Kediri*	Persiwa Wamena	3−0	22 November 2009	
18	Keith Gumbs	Saint Kitts and Nevis	Sriwijaya*	Persijap Jepara	4−0	6 December 2009	
19	Kenji Adachihara	Japan	Bontang*	Persiwa Wamena	6−1	10 January 2010	
20	Talaohu Musafri	Indonesia	Persija Jakarta*	Persitara Jakarta Utara	3−0	20 January 2010	
21	Boaz Solossa	Indonesia	Persipura Jayapura	Persela Lamongan*	3−1	10 February 2010	
22	Samsul Arif	Indonesia	Persela Lamongan*	Persiwa Wamena	7−2	12 February 2010	
23	Saktiawan Sinaga	Indonesia	Persik Kediri*	Persela Lamongan	3−2	24 February 2010	
24	Cristian Gonzáles	Uruguay	Persib Bandung*	Persema Malang	4−0	17 March 2010	
25	Noh Alam Shah	Singapore	Arema Indonesia*	Pelita Jaya	6−1	3 April 2010	
26	Aldo Barreto	Paraguay	Bontang*	Persijap Jepara	4−1	28 April 2010	
27	Redouane Barkaoui	Morocco	Pelita Jaya*	Persela Lamongan	6−3	30 May 2010	
28	Edward Wilson Junior	Liberia	Semen Padang*	Persiwa Wamena	3−0	30 September 2010	
29	Noh Alam Shah	Singapore	Arema Indonesia	Bontang*	5−0	2 October 2010	
30	Boaz Solossa	Indonesia	Persipura Jayapura*	Arema Indonesia	6−1	7 March 2011	
31	Miljan Radovic	Montenegro	Persib Bandung*	Persiwa Wamena	5−2	24 March 2011	
32	Edward Wilson Junior	Liberia	Semen Padang	Deltras*	3−0	12 April 2011	
33	Noh Alam Shah^{4}	Singapore	Arema Indonesia*	PSPS Pekanbaru	4−2	15 April 2011	
34	Greg Nwokolo	Nigeria	Persija Jakarta*	Persisam Putra	7−2	23 April 2011	
35	Aldo Barreto	Paraguay	Persiba Balikpapan*	Persela Lamongan	4−0	24 April 2011	
36	Aldo Barreto	Paraguay	Persiba Balikpapan	Bontang*	5−3	5 May 2011	
37	Yongki Aribowo	Indonesia	Arema Indonesia*	Bontang	8−0	19 June 2011	
38	Boakay Eddie Foday	Liberia	Persiwa Wamena*	Pelita Jaya	3−3	19 June 2011	
39	Hilton Moreira	Brazil	Sriwijaya	Arema Indonesia*	5−1	8 January 2012	
40	Patrich Wanggai	Indonesia	Persidafon Dafonsoro*	Persela Lamongan	4−5	18 January 2012	
41	Mario Costas	Argentina	Persela Lamongan	Persidafon Dafonsoro*	5−4	18 January 2012	
42	Márcio Souza	Brazil	Arema Indonesia	Deltras*	3−3	18 January 2012	
43	Gastón Castaño	Argentina	Gresik United*	Persidafon Dafonsoro	3−2	18 February 2012	
44	Zaenal Arif	Indonesia	PSPS Pekanbaru*	Gresik United	3−0	6 March 2012	
45	Safee Sali^{4}	Malaysia	Pelita Jaya	Gresik United*	6−1	24 March 2012	
46	Bambang Pamungkas	Indonesia	Persija Jakarta	PSMS Medan*	3−3	30 March 2012	
47	Cristian Gonzáles^{4}	Indonesia	Persisam Putra*	Gresik United	4−0	29 May 2012	
48	Boakay Eddie Foday	Liberia	Persiwa Wamena*	PSAP Sigli	4−1	3 June 2012	
49	Alberto Gonçalves	Brazil	Persipura Jayapura*	PSAP Sigli	7−1	7 June 2012	
50	Pedro Velázquez	Paraguay	Persija Jakarta*	PSPS Pekanbaru	4−0	19 June 2012	
51	Mario Costas	Argentina	Persela Lamongan*	Gresik United	6−2	25 June 2012	
52	Alberto Gonçalves	Brazil	Persipura Jayapura*	Mitra Kukar	4−2	27 June 2012	
53	Cristian Gonzáles	Indonesia	Arema Indonesia*	Persidafon Dafonsoro	5−2	9 January 2013	
54	Zulham Zamrun	Indonesia	Mitra Kukar*	Sriwijaya	4−2	26 January 2013	
55	Boakay Eddie Foday	Liberia	Sriwijaya*	Persija Jakarta	4−1	2 February 2013	
56	Alberto Gonçalves	Brazil	Arema Indonesia*	Pelita Bandung Raya	4−2	28 February 2013	
57	Tantan	Indonesia	Sriwijaya	Gresik United*	4–3	1 March 2013	
58	Yohanes Pahabol	Indonesia	Persipura Jayapura	Mitra Kukar*	3–0	13 March 2013	
59	Pape N'Diaye	Senegal	PSPS Pekanbaru*	Persela Lamongan	4–2	16 March 2013	
60	Djibril Coulibaly^{4}	Mali	Barito Putera*	PSPS Pekanbaru	5–2	27 April 2013	
61	Fahad Al-Dossari	Saudi Arabia	Persiram Raja Ampat*	PSPS Pekanbaru	5–0	26 May 2013	
62	Osas Saha	Nigeria	Persisam Putra*	Persidafon Dafonsoro	5–1	3 June 2013	
63	Mario Costas	Argentina	Persela Lamongan*	PSPS Pekanbaru	9–1	12 June 2013	
64	Osas Saha	Nigeria	Persisam Putra	Persiwa Wamena*	3–1	16 June 2013	
65	Greg Nwokolo^{4}	Indonesia	Arema Indonesia*	PSPS Pekanbaru	7–1	4 July 2013	
66	Patrich Wanggai	Indonesia	Persipura Jayapura*	Persiram Raja Ampat	3–0	4 July 2013	
67	Rossy Noprihanis	Indonesia	Persepam MU*	Persiba Balikpapan	3–2	7 July 2013	
68	Emmanuel Kenmogne	Cameroon	Persija Jakarta	PSPS Pekanbaru*	6–0	24 August 2013	
69	Ilija Spasojević^{5}	Montenegro	Mitra Kukar*	PSPS Pekanbaru	8–2	15 September 2013	
70	Cristian Carrasco	Chile	Persita Tangerang	Persiwa Wamena*	3–2	18 September 2013	
71	Ilija Spasojević	Montenegro	Putra Samarinda*	Perseru Serui	5–0	9 February 2014	
72	Bijahil Chalwa	Indonesia	Persela Lamongan*	Persebaya ISL	3–0	10 February 2014	
73	Herman Dzumafo	Cameroon	Mitra Kukar*	Persela Lamongan	5–1	20 February 2014	
74	Srđan Lopičić	Montenegro	Persela Lamongan*	Persepam MU	3–0	10 March 2014	
75	Emmanuel Kenmogne	Cameroon	Persebaya ISL	Persepam MU*	4–1	14 March 2014	
76	Boaz Solossa	Indonesia	Persipura Jayapura	Persiba Bantul*	5–2	2 May 2014	
77	Samsul Arif	Indonesia	Arema Cronus*	Gresik United	5–0	8 May 2014	
78	Greg Nwokolo	Indonesia	Persebaya ISL*	Persiba Balikpapan	4–0	8 June 2014	
79	Bambang Pamungkas	Indonesia	Persija Jakarta	Arema Cronus*	4–4	4 April 2015	

List of Liga 1 (Indonesia) hat-tricks (2017–2025)
#	Player	Nationality	For	Against	Result	Date	Ref
80	Peter Odemwingie	Nigeria	Madura United*	Semen Padang	6–0	12 June 2017	
81	Prisca Womsiwor	Indonesia	Persipura Jayapura*	Mitra Kukar	6–0	3 July 2017	
82	Addison Alves	Brazil	Persipura Jayapura*	Bali United	3–1	9 August 2017	
83	Sylvano Comvalius	Netherlands	Bali United*	Madura United	5–2	13 August 2017	
84	Raphael Maitimo	Indonesia	Persib Bandung*	Persegres	6–0	20 August 2017	
85	Sylvano Comvalius^{5}	Netherlands	Bali United*	Mitra Kukar	6–1	27 August 2017	
86	Samsul Arif	Indonesia	Persela Lamongan*	Persegres	7–1	30 September 2017	
87	Boaz Solossa	Indonesia	Persipura Jayapura*	Persija Jakarta	3–0	18 October 2017	
88	Élio Martins	Portugal	PS TNI	Persegres*	3–0	28 October 2017	
89	Alberto Gonçalves	Brazil	Sriwijaya*	Persegres	10–2	5 November 2017	
90	Slamet Budiyono	Indonesia	Sriwijaya*	Persegres	10–2	5 November 2017	
91	Ilija Spasojević	Montenegro	Bhayangkara	Madura United*	3–1	8 November 2017	
92	Muhammad Rahmat	Indonesia	PSM Makassar*	Madura United	6–1	12 November 2017	
93	David da Silva	Brazil	Persebaya Surabaya	PS TIRA*	4–1	13 April 2018	
94	Bruno Silva	Brazil	PSIS Semarang*	PSMS Medan	4–1	15 April 2018	
95	Aleksandar Rakić	Serbia	PS TIRA	PSM Makassar*	3–4	21 April 2018	
96	Samsul Arif^{4}	Indonesia	Barito Putera	Mitra Kukar*	4–3	6 July 2018	
97	Dendy Sulistyawan	Indonesia	Persela Lamongan*	Persipura Jayapura	3–2	29 July 2018	
98	David da Silva	Brazil	Persebaya Surabaya*	Mitra Kukar	4–1	22 September 2018	
99	Osvaldo Haay	Indonesia	Persebaya Surabaya*	Madura United	4–0	25 October 2018	
100	Matías Conti	Argentina	Borneo*	Bhayangkara	3–0	29 October 2018	
101	David da Silva	Brazil	Persebaya Surabaya	Bali United*	5–2	18 November 2018	
102	Aleksandar Rakić	Serbia	PS TIRA	PSMS Medan*	4–2	5 December 2018	
103	Flávio Beck	Brazil	Bhayangkara*	Barito Putera	4–2	28 May 2019	
104	Amido Baldé	Guinea-Bissau	Persebaya Surabaya*	Persib Bandung	4–0	5 July 2019	
105	Alex Gonçalves	Brazil	Persela Lamongan*	Kalteng Putra	3–0	11 July 2019	
106	Marko Šimić	Croatia	Persija Jakarta	TIRA-Persikabo*	3–5	16 July 2019	
107	Makan Konaté	Mali	Arema*	Badak Lampung	4–1	16 July 2019	
108	Hédipo Gustavo	Brazil	Kalteng Putra*	Bhayangkara	3–2	25 August 2019	
109	Alex Gonçalves	Brazil	Persela Lamongan*	TIRA-Persikabo	6–1	25 August 2019	
110	Francisco Torres	Brazil	Barito Putera*	Badak Lampung	4–1	18 October 2019	
111	Marquinhos Carioca	Brazil	Badak Lampung*	Arema	4–3	1 November 2019	
112	Marko Šimić^{4}	Croatia	Persija Jakarta*	Borneo	4–2	11 November 2019	
113	Matías Conti	Argentina	Borneo*	TIRA-Persikabo	4–1	6 December 2019	
114	Marko Šimić	Croatia	Persija Jakarta*	Madura United	4–0	13 December 2019	
115	Ezechiel N'Douassel^{4}	Chad	Persib Bandung*	PSM Makassar	5–2	22 December 2019	
116	Ciro Alves	Brazil	Persikabo 1973*	Persela Lamongan	4–2	27 November 2021	
117	Ciro Alves	Brazil	Persikabo 1973*	Persiraja Banda Aceh	5–0	9 December 2021	
118	Samsul Arif	Indonesia	Persebaya Surabaya	Persikabo 1973*	3–2	10 January 2022	
119	Ciro Alves	Brazil	Persikabo 1973	Persiraja Banda Aceh*	5–0	19 March 2022	
120	Lulinha	Brazil	Madura United*	Barito Putera	8–0	23 July 2022	
121	Riyan Ardiansyah	Indonesia	PSIS Semarang*	Persikabo 1973	3–2	9 September 2022	
122	Ilija Spasojević	Indonesia	Bali United*	Dewa United	6–0	10 September 2022	
123	Matheus Pato	Brazil	Borneo Samarinda*	Madura United	3–0	1 October 2022	
124	Matheus Pato	Brazil	Borneo Samarinda*	PSIS Semarang	6–1	12 March 2023	
125	Alex Martins	Brazil	Bhayangkara*	RANS Nusantara	5–1	30 March 2023	
126	Matheus Pato	Brazil	Borneo Samarinda*	Bali United	5–1	3 April 2023	
127	Michael Krmenčík	Czech Republic	Persija Jakarta*	PSS Sleman	5–0	15 April 2023	
128	Gustavo	Brazil	Arema*	Persib Bandung	3–3	7 July 2023	
129	David da Silva	Brazil	Persib Bandung*	Persita Tangerang	5–0	1 October 2023	
130	Stefano Lilipaly	Indonesia	Borneo Samarinda*	Dewa United	3–1	28 October 2023	
131	Felipe Cadenazzi	Argentina	Borneo Samarinda*	Persik Kediri	3–0	2 November 2023	
132	Flávio Silva	Portugal	Persik Kediri*	Madura United	4–0	8 November 2023	
133	Ciro Alves	Brazil	Persib Bandung	Dewa United*	5–1	26 November 2023	
134	Moussa Sidibé	Mali	Persis Solo*	Madura United	3–2	30 January 2024	
135	Alex Martins	Brazil	Dewa United*	RANS Nusantara	5–0	27 February 2024	
136	Flávio Silva^{5}	Portugal	Persik Kediri*	Persikabo 1973	5–2	28 March 2024	
137	Matías Mier	Uruguay	Bhayangkara*	Persik Kediri	7–0	16 April 2024	
138	David da Silva	Brazil	Persib Bandung*	Persebaya Surabaya	3–1	20 April 2024	
139	Flávio Silva	Portugal	Persik Kediri*	PSS Sleman	4–4	24 April 2024	
140	Matías Mier	Uruguay	Bhayangkara	Barito Putera*	5–1	25 April 2024	
141	Gustavo	Brazil	Persija Jakarta*	Barito Putera	3–0	10 August 2024	
142	Egy Maulana Vikri	Indonesia	Dewa United	Semen Padang*	8–1	25 October 2024	
143	Marios Ogkmpoe	Greece	Persita Tangerang	PSBS Biak*	3–1	12 December 2024	
144	Gustavo	Brazil	Persija Jakarta*	PSS Sleman	3–1	21 December 2024	
145	Matías Mier	Uruguay	Barito Putera*	Persebaya Surabaya	3–0	25 January 2025	
146	Alex Martins	Brazil	Dewa United*	PSM Makassar	3–2	27 January 2025	
147	Alex Martins	Brazil	Dewa United	PSIS Semarang*	4–1	3 February 2025	
148	Alex Martins^{4}	Brazil	Dewa United*	Semen Padang	6–0	5 March 2025	
149	Yakob Sayuri	Indonesia	Malut United	Persis Solo*	3–1	12 April 2025	
150	Yance Sayuri	Indonesia	Malut United*	PSIS Semarang	5–1	16 May 2025	
151	Alex Martins	Brazil	Dewa United*	PSBS Biak	4–0	23 May 2025	

List of Super League (Indonesia) hat-tricks (2025–present)
#	Player	Nationality	For	Against	Result	Date	Ref
152	Dalberto	Brazil	Arema*	PSBS Biak	4–1	11 August 2025	
153	Ciro Alves	Brazil	Malut United*	Madura United	4–1	19 September 2025	
154	Maxwell	Brazil	Persija Jakarta*	PSBS Biak	3–1	31 October 2025	
155	Alex Tanque	Brazil	PSM Makassar*	PSBS Biak	5–0	21 November 2025	
156	David da Silva	Brazil	Malut United*	Persis Solo	5–2	2 May 2026	
157	Alex Martins^{4}	Brazil	Dewa United Banten	PSBS Biak*	5–0	8 May 2026	
158	Bruno Paraíba	Brazil	Persebaya Surabaya	Semen Padang*	7–0	15 May 2026	
159	Jort van der Sande	Bonaire	Bali United*	Persijap Jepara	6–1	10 October 2026	
160	Pablo Ganet	Equatorial Guinea	Persita Tangerang	Persik Kediri*	5–1	31 October 2026	

== Multiple hat-tricks ==
The following table lists the number of hat-tricks scored by players who have scored two or more hat-tricks.

Players in bold are still active in the Super League. Players in italics are still active outside the Super League.

Rank	Player	Hat-tricks	Last hat-trick
1	(Brazil) **Alex Martins**	7	8 May 2026
2	(Indonesia) Boaz Solossa	6	18 October 2017
2	(Brazil) **David da Silva**	6	2 May 2026
4	(Uruguay) (Indonesia) Cristian Gonzáles	5	9 January 2013
4	(Brazil) (Indonesia) Alberto Gonçalves	5	5 November 2017
4	(Indonesia) Samsul Arif	5	10 January 2022
4	(Brazil) **Ciro Alves**	5	19 September 2025
8	(Liberia) Boakay Eddie Foday	4	2 February 2013
8	(Nigeria) (Indonesia) Greg Nwokolo	4	8 June 2014
8	(Montenegro) (Indonesia) **Ilija Spasojević**	4	10 September 2022
11	(Singapore) Noh Alam Shah	3	15 April 2011
11	(Paraguay) Aldo Barreto	3	5 May 2011
11	(Argentina) Mario Costas	3	12 June 2013
11	(Indonesia) Bambang Pamungkas	3	4 April 2015
11	(Croatia) Marko Šimić	3	13 December 2019
11	(Brazil) Matheus Pato	3	3 April 2023
11	(Portugal) Flávio Silva	3	24 April 2024
11	(Brazil) **Gustavo**	3	21 December 2024
11	(Uruguay) Matías Mier	3	25 January 2025
20	(Indonesia) Talaohu Musafri	2	20 January 2010
20	(Indonesia) Saktiawan Sinaga	2	24 February 2010
20	(Liberia) Edward Wilson Junior	2	12 April 2011
20	(Brazil) Márcio Souza	2	18 January 2012
20	(Nigeria) (Indonesia) Osas Saha	2	16 June 2013
20	(Indonesia) Patrich Wanggai	2	4 July 2013
20	(Cameroon) Emmanuel Kenmogne	2	14 March 2014
20	(Netherlands) Sylvano Comvalius	2	27 August 2017
20	(Serbia) Aleksandar Rakić	2	21 April 2018
20	(Brazil) Alex Gonçalves	2	25 August 2019
20	(Argentina) Matías Conti	2	6 December 2019

== Hat-tricks by nationality ==
The following table lists the number of hat-tricks scored by players from a single nation.

Rank	Nation	Hat-tricks	Last hat-trick
1	Indonesia	47	16 May 2025
2	Brazil	46	15 May 2026
3	Argentina	7	2 November 2023
4	Liberia	6	2 February 2013
4	Uruguay	6	25 January 2025
6	Nigeria	5	12 June 2017
6	Montenegro	5	8 November 2017
8	Paraguay	4	19 June 2012
8	Cameroon	4	14 March 2014
8	Portugal	4	24 April 2024
11	Singapore	3	15 April 2011
11	Croatia	3	13 December 2019
11	Mali	3	30 January 2024
14	Netherlands	2	27 August 2017
14	Serbia	2	5 December 2018
16	Saint Kitts and Nevis	1	6 December 2009
16	Japan	1	10 January 2010
16	Morocco	1	30 May 2010
16	Malaysia	1	24 March 2012
16	Senegal	1	16 March 2013
16	Saudi Arabia	1	26 May 2013
16	Chile	1	18 September 2013
16	Guinea-Bissau	1	5 July 2019
16	Chad	1	22 December 2019
16	Czech Republic	1	15 April 2023
16	Greece	1	12 December 2024
16	Bonaire	1	10 October 2026
16	Equatorial Guinea	1	31 October 2026

Note:

- Cristian Gonzáles scored three hat-tricks when he was still an Uruguayan citizen and two when he was an Indonesian citizen.
- Greg Nwokolo scored two hat-tricks when he was still a Nigerian citizen and two when he was an Indonesian citizen.
- Ilija Spasojević scored three hat-tricks when he was still a Montenegrin citizen and one when he was an Indonesian citizen.

== Hat-tricks by club ==
The following table lists the number of hat-tricks scored by players from certain clubs.

Rank	Club	Hat-tricks	Last hat-trick
1	Persija Jakarta	15	31 October 2025
2	Persipura Jayapura	13	18 October 2017
3	Arema (Note: Include stats as Arema Indonesia and Arema Cronus.)	12	11 August 2025
4	Persela Lamongan	11	25 August 2019
5	Persebaya Surabaya	9	15 May 2026
6	Persib Bandung	8	20 April 2024
6	Bali United (Note: Include stats as Persisam Putra and Putra Samarinda.)	8	10 October 2026
8	Sriwijaya	7	5 November 2017
8	Persikabo 1973 (Note: Include stats as Persiram Raja Ampat, PS TNI, PS TIRA, and TIRA-Persikabo.)	7	19 March 2022
8	Borneo Samarinda (Note: Include stats as Borneo.)	7	2 November 2023
8	Bhayangkara (Note: Include stats as Persebaya ISL.)	7	25 April 2024
8	Dewa United Banten (Note: Include stats as Dewa United.)	7	8 May 2026
13	Persik Kediri	6	24 April 2024
14	Madura United (Note: Include stats as Pelita Jaya and Pelita Bandung Raya.)	4	23 July 2022
14	Barito Putera	4	25 January 2025
14	Malut United	4	2 May 2026
17	Persiba Balikpapan	3	5 May 2011
17	Persiwa Wamena	3	3 June 2012
17	Mitra Kukar	3	20 February 2014
17	PSM Makassar	3	21 November 2025
17	Persita Tangerang	3	31 October 2026
22	Bontang (Note: Include stats as PKT Bontang.)	2	28 April 2010
22	Semen Padang	2	12 April 2011
22	PSPS Pekanbaru	2	16 March 2013
22	PSIS Semarang	2	9 September 2022
26	PSMS Medan	1	23 October 2008
26	Persijap Jepara	1	17 October 2009
26	Persidafon Dafonsoro	1	18 January 2012
26	Gresik United	1	18 February 2012
26	Persepam MU	1	7 July 2013
26	Kalteng Putra	1	25 August 2019
26	Badak Lampung	1	1 November 2019
26	Persis Solo	1	30 January 2024

== See also ==
- Indonesia Super League
- Football records in Indonesia
