= 2011–12 Indonesian Premier League =

Indonesian Premier League
- Season: 2011–12
- Dates: 26 November 2011 – 17 July 2012
- Champions: Semen Padang; 1st IPL title 1st Indonesian title
- Relegated: PSMS Medan
- AFC Cup: Semen Padang; Persibo Bojonegoro
- Matches: 264
- Goals: 359 (1.36 per match)
- Top goalscorer: 15 goals (Indonesia) Ferdinand Sinaga
- Biggest home win: Arema Indonesia 7–0 Bontang FC
- Biggest away win: Bontang FC 2–5 Persema Malang
- Highest scoring: Semen Padang FC 6–2 Persema Malang
- Longest winning run: Persema Malang; Persiba Bantul (3)
- Longest unbeaten run: Semen Padang FC (8)
- Longest winless run: Persijap Jepara (10)
- Longest losing run: PSMS Medan (4)
- Highest attendance: 51,000

The 2011–12 Indonesian Premier League season was the inaugural season of the Indonesian Premier League (IPL), a fully professional football competition that shared with the Indonesia Super League (ISL) as the top tier of the football league pyramid in Indonesia.

After the signing of the MoU between Djohar Arifin Husein (PSSI) and La Nyalla Matalitti (KPSI-PSSI) that was initiated by FIFA and the AFC through the AFC Task Force, the Indonesia Super League and Indonesian Premier League were under the control of the joint committee until the establishment of a new professional competition by the committee.

== Teams ==
=== Stadium and locations ===
Team location

Club	City	Province	Region	Stadium	Capacity	2010–11 season
Arema Malang	Malang	East Java	Java	Gajayana	30,000	Indonesia Super League Runners-up
Bontang FC	Bontang	East Kalimantan	Kalimantan	Mulawarman	20,000	15th Indonesia Super League
Persebaya 1927	Surabaya	East Java	Java	Gelora Bung Tomo	50,000	1st Liga Primer Indonesia
Persema Malang	Malang	East Java	Java	Gajayana	30,000	2011 Liga Primer Indonesia Runners-up
Persiba Bantul	Bantul	Yogyakarta	Java	Sultan Agung	35,000	Liga Indonesia Premier Division Champions
Persibo Bojonegoro	Bojonegoro	East Java	Java	Letjen Haji Sudirman	15,000	8th Liga Primer Indonesia
Jakarta FC	Madiun	Jakarta	Java	Wilis	25,000	4th Liga Primer Indonesia
Persijap Jepara	Jepara	Central Java	Java	Gelora Bumi Kartini	25,000	14th in Indonesia Super League
Persiraja Banda Aceh	Banda Aceh	Aceh	Sumatra	Harapan Bangsa; H. Dimurthala	40,000; 15,000	Liga Indonesia Premier Division Runners-up
PSM Makassar	Makassar	South Sulawesi	Sulawesi	Mattoangin	30,000	3rd Liga Primer Indonesia
PSMS Medan	Medan	North Sumatra	Sumatra	Teladan	22,234	3rd Group 1 Liga Indonesia Premier Division
Semen Padang FC	Padang	West Sumatra	Sumatra	Haji Agus Salim	28,000	4th in Indonesia Super League

=== Personnel and kits ===
Note: Flags indicate national team as has been defined under FIFA eligibility rules. Players and Managers may hold more than one non-FIFA nationality.

Team	Coach^{1}	Captain	Kit manufacturer	Shirt sponsor
Arema Indonesia	(Serbia) Dejan Antonić	(Indonesia) Legimin Raharjo	Umbro	
Bontang FC	(Indonesia) Eddy Simon	(Indonesia) Ridwansyah	SPECS	
Persebaya 1927	(Portugal) Divaldo Alves	(Indonesia) Erol Iba	Mitre	
Persema Malang	(North Macedonia) Slave Radovský	(Indonesia) Bima Sakti	Reebok	
Persiba Bantul	(Indonesia) M. Basri	(Indonesia) Wahyu Wijiastanto		
Persibo Bojonegoro	(Brazil) Paulo Camargo	(Indonesia) Samsul Arif	Mitre	
Jakarta FC	(Indonesia) Toyo Hartoyo	(Brazil) Danilo Fernando	Mitre	
Persijap Jepara	(Indonesia) Agus Yuwono	(Indonesia) Anam Syahrul	Mitre	Bank Jateng
Persiraja Banda Aceh	(Indonesia) Herry Kiswanto	(Guinea) Abdoulaye Djibril	Mitre	
PSM Makassar	(Croatia) Petar Segrt	(Indonesia) Andi Oddang	Vilour	Bosowa
PSMS Medan	(Italy) Fabio Lopez	(Indonesia) Fadly Hariri		
Semen Padang FC	(Indonesia) Nil Maizar	(Indonesia) Elie Aiboy	SPECS	Semen Padang

=== Foreign players ===
Club	Player 1	Player 2	Player 3	Asian Player	Former Player(s)
Arema	(Latvia) Deniss Romanovs	(Serbia) Marko Krasić	(Slovakia) Roman Chmelo	(Australia) Andrew Barisic	(Singapore) Noh Alam Shah
Bontang FC	(Guinea) Fassawa Camara	(Cameroon) Serge Emaleu	(Guinea) Kande Lansana	(Japan) Masahiro Fukasawa	
Persebaya 1927	(Brazil) Otavio Dutra	(Argentina) Fernando Soler	(Argentina) Walter Bruzuela	(Australia) Mario Karlovic	(Australia) Andrew Barisic
Persema Malang	(Latvia) Deniss Kačanovs	(Cameroon) Émile Mbamba	(Cameroon) Ngon Mamoun	(Australia) Naum Sekulovski	
Persiba Bantul	(Brazil) Carlos Eduardo	(Argentina) Ezequiel González	(Nigeria) Ernest Jeremiah	(South Korea) Kim Yong-Han	(Argentina) Emmanuel Cristori
Persibo Bojonegoro	(Argentina) Gustavo Hernan Ortiz	(Brazil) Jairon Feliciano	(Brazil) Lexe Anderson	(Turkmenistan) Mekan Nasyrov	(Liberia) Joseph Amoah
Jakarta FC	(Brazil) Danilo Fernando	(Argentina) Emanuel De Porras	(Brazil) David da Rocha	(Australia) Aleks Vrteski	(Portugal) Jaime Bragança
Persijap Jepara	(Chile) Julio Lopez	(Argentina) J.Sebastian	(Cameroon) Banaken Bassoken	(South Korea) Kim Sang-Duk	(Spain) Xavi Pérez
Persiraja	(Germany) Patrick Ghigani	(Guinea) Diallo Abdoulaye Djibril	(Liberia) Stephen Mennoh	(Timor-Leste) Murilo de Almeida	
PSM	(Montenegro) Ilija Spasojević	(Chile) Cristian Febre	(Romania) Claudiu Răducanu	(South Korea) Kwon Jun	(Australia) Srećko Mitrović
PSMS	(Argentina) Julio Alcorsé	(North Macedonia) Goran Gančev	(Brazil) Vagner Luis	(South Korea) Ahn Hyo-Yeon	(Singapore) Baihakki Khaizan
Semen Padang	(Argentina) Esteban Vizcarra	(Cameroon) David Pagbe	(Liberia) Edward Junior Wilson	(South Korea) Yoo Hyun-Koo	

=== Managerial changes ===
Team	Outgoing manager	Manner of departure	Date of vacancy	Position in table	Incoming manager	Date of appointment
Arema FC	(Bosnia and Herzegovina) Milomir Seslija	Sacked	January 2012	5th	(Indonesia) Abdul Rahman Gurning (caretaker)	January 2012
Arema FC	(Indonesia) Abdul Rahman Gurning	Caretaker	24 January 2012	6th	(Serbia) Dejan Antonić	24 January 2012
Jakarta FC	(Indonesia) Jaya Hartono	Resigned	March 2012	10th	(Indonesia) Toyo Hartoyo (caretaker)	March 2012
Semen Padang	(Indonesia) Nil Maizar	Signed by Indonesia	March 2012	1st	(Indonesia) Suhatman Imam (caretaker)	April 2012

== League table ==
Pos	Team	Pld	W	D	L	GF	GA	GD	Pts	Qualification or relegation
1	Semen Padang (C)	22	13	7	2	46	21	+25	46	2013 AFC Cup Group stage
2	Persebaya 1927	22	12	2	8	31	23	+8	38	
3	Arema Indonesia	22	11	4	7	42	26	+16	37	
4	Persibo Bojonegoro	22	11	3	8	31	24	+7	36	2013 AFC Cup Group stage (Note: Persibo Bojonegoro were chosen by PSSI to join the Group stage of the 2013 AFC Cup as the winner of 2012 Piala Indonesia.)
5	Persiba Bantul	22	10	5	7	27	23	+4	35	
6	PSM	22	9	7	6	29	26	+3	34	
7	Persiraja	22	9	5	8	27	30	−3	32	
8	Persema Malang (Note: Persema Malang, Jakarta FC, Persijap Jepara, Bontang FC, and PSMS Medan were deducted 3 points due to the punishment from PSSI's Discipline Committee)	22	10	4	8	32	32	0	31	
9	Persija IPL (Jakarta FC)	22	7	7	8	38	34	+4	25	
10	Persijap Jepara	22	4	5	13	18	38	−20	14	
11	Bontang FC (O)	22	4	4	14	21	43	−22	13	Qualification for 2012–13 Indonesian Premier League Playoffs
12	PSMS (R)	22	2	7	13	17	39	−22	10	Relegation to 2013 Indonesian Premier Division

Updated to match(es) played on 17 July 2012. Source: IPL
Rules for classification: 1) points; 2) goal difference; 3) number of goals scored.
(C) Champions; (O) Play-off winners; (R) Relegated

== Results ==
Home \ Away	ARE	BON	PSBY	PSMA	PSBN	PSBO	JFC	PSJP	RAJ	PSM	MED	SPD
Arema		7–0	2–1	4–0	0–1	2–0	3–2	2–2	2–1	4–0	2–1	2–1
Bontang FC	1–0		3–4	2–5	2–0	2–0	0–3	1–1	1–2	1–1	2–0	0–2
Persebaya Surabaya	2–1	1–0		0–0	0–1	2–0	3–3	2–1	2–1	2–0	3–0	0–1
Persema Malang	1–0	2–0	2–1		3–0	1–0	0–3	2–1	1–0	0–0	4–1	2–3
Persiba Bantul	1–0	1–0	0–1	3–1		2–1	1–0	2–1	1–1	2–0	2–2	1–1
Persibo Bojonegoro	3–1	4–2	1–0	0–0	3–2		1–0	5–0	2–0	1–1	1–0	2–4
Jakarta FC	3–3	1–1	0–2	2–1	0–3	2–3		6–1	3–1	1–0	1–1	0–3
Persijap Jepara	0–1	2–0	0–1	1–1	1–0	1–0	1–0		1–2	1–2	1–1	1–0
Persiraja	1–1	0–0	2–1	1–0	2–1	1–0	3–3	2–1		2–1	2–0	2–2
PSM Makassar	1–1	2–1	2–0	4–2	2–1	2–1	1–1	3–0	3–0		2–1	1–1
PSMS	1–3	2–0	1–2	0–2	2–2	0–2	1–3	1–1	1–0	0–0		1–1
Semen Padang	3–1	3–2	2–1	6–2	0–0	0–0	1–1	3–0	3–1	3–1	3–0	

Updated to match(es) played on 17 July 2012. Source: IPL
Legend: Blue = home team win; Yellow = draw; Red = away team win.

== Goal scorers ==
Rank	Scorer	Club	Goals
1	(Indonesia) Ferdinand Sinaga	Semen Padang F.C.	15
2	(Liberia) Edward Wilson Junior	Semen Padang F.C.	13
3	(Indonesia) Muhammad Nur Iskandar	Persibo Bojonegoro	11
3	(Argentina) Emanuel De Porras	Jakarta FC	11
5	(Cameroon) Émile Mbamba	Persema Malang	10
5	(Montenegro) Ilija Spasojevic	PSM Makassar	10
5	(Indonesia) Muhammad Rachmat	PSM Makassar	10
8	(Argentina) Fernando Gaston Soler	Persebaya Surabaya	3
9	(Indonesia) T.A. Musafri	Arema Indonesia	7
10	(Guinea) Fassawa Camara	Bontang FC	6
10	(Indonesia) Samsul Arif	Persibo Bojonegoro	6
10	(Chile) Julio Lopez	Persijap Jepara	6
13	(Australia) Andrew Barisic	Arema Indonesia	5
13	(Slovakia) Roman Chmelo	Arema Indonesia	5
13	(Cameroon) Guy Bertrand Ngon Mamoun	Persema Malang	5
13	(Indonesia) Hendra Bayauw	Jakarta FC	5
13	(Indonesia) I Made Wirahadi	Persijap Jepara	5
13	(Indonesia) Vendry Mofu	Semen Padang F.C.	5
19	(Indonesia) Ahmad Amirudin	Arema Indonesia	4
19	(Indonesia) Feri Ariawan	Persebaya Surabaya	4
19	(Indonesia) Ugik Sugiyanto	Persiba Bantul	4
19	(Brazil) Danilo Fernando	Jakarta FC	4
19	(Indonesia) Sansan Fauzi Husaeni	Jakarta FC	4
19	(Indonesia) Fahrizal Dillah	Persiraja Banda Aceh	4
19	(Indonesia) Jecky Pasarela	PSMS Medan	4
19	(Argentina) Julio Alcorsé	PSMS Medan	4

=== Hat-tricks ===
Player	For	Against	Result	Date
(Liberia) Edward Wilson Junior	Semen Padang	Persema Malang	6–2	1 December 2011
(Indonesia) Amad Iskandar	Persibo Bojonegoro	Persijap Jepara	5–0	8 January 2012
(Cameroon) Émile Mbamba	Persema Malang	PSMS Medan	4–1	23 January 2012
(Montenegro) Ilija Spasojevic	PSM Makassar	Persijap Jepara	3–0	24 March 2012

== Play-offs ==
The play-offs started on 26 November 2012.

Pos	Team	Pld	W	D	L	GF	GA	GD	Pts	Promotion or qualification
1	Bontang FC	2	2	0	0	2	0	+2	6	
2	PSLS Lhokseumawe (P)	2	1	0	1	1	1	0	3	Promotion to 2013 Indonesian Premier League
3	PSIR (P)	2	0	0	2	0	2	−2	0	Promotion to 2013 Indonesian Premier League
4	Persbul Buol (Note: Persbul moved to 2013 Liga Indonesia Premier Division.)	0	0	0	0	0	0	0	0	Disqualified

Updated to match(es) played on 29 November 2012. Source: IPL
Rules for classification: 1) points; 2) goal difference; 3) number of goals scored.
(P) Promoted
