= Football records and statistics in Indonesia =

This page details football records in Indonesia.

== National team ==
=== Scorelines ===
- Biggest win: 12 goal margin
  - 12–0, v. Philippines (22 September 1972)
  - 13–1, v. Philippines (23 December 2002)
- Biggest home win: 13–1, v. Philippines (23 December 2002)
- Biggest away win: 8–0, v. New Zealand (4 October 1975)
- Biggest win in neutral ground: 12–0, v. Philippines (Seoul, 22 September 1972)
- Biggest defeat: 0–10, v. Bahrain (29 February 2012)
- Biggest home defeat: 1–7, v. Uruguay (8 October 2010)
- Biggest away defeat: 0–10, v. Bahrain (29 February 2012)
- Biggest defeat in neutral ground: 0–6, v. Hungary (Reims, 5 June 1938)
- Highest scoring: 14 goals, Indonesia 13–1 Philippines (23 December 2002)

=== Individual ===
- Most appearances: 111, Abdul Kadir (1965–1979; 105 in official FIFA matches)
- Most goals: 70, Abdul Kadir (1965–1979; 68 in official FIFA matches)
- Best scoring percentage (players with 20+ goals): 63% (70 goals in 111 games), Abdul Kadir (1965–1979)

== Top-tier professional league ==
Records in this section refer to Liga Indonesia Premier Division from its founding in 1994 until 2007 (when it was still the top-tier professional league), to the Indonesia Super League from 2008 to the present, and to the Indonesian Premier League during the dualism era.

=== Titles ===
- Most titles: 5, Persib Bandung (1994–95, 2014, 2023–24, 2024–25, 2025–26)
- Most consecutive title wins: 3, Persib Bandung (2023–24, 2024–25, 2025–26)

=== Appearances ===
- Most overall seasons: 31 seasons (Note: Total seasons including ISC A)
  - Persib Bandung
  - Persija Jakarta
- Most consecutive seasons: 31 seasons (1994–95 to 2026–27)
  - Persib Bandung
  - Persija Jakarta

=== Scorelines ===
- Biggest home win: 9–0
  - Persita Tangerang 10–1 Persikab Bandung (28 April 2002)
- Biggest away win: 8–0
  - Persijap Jepara 0–8 Arema Cronus (5 September 2014)
- Highest scoring: 12 goals
  - Pelita Jaya 10–2 Persijatim East Jakarta (14 June 1995)
  - Sriwijaya 10–2 Persegres Gresik United (5 November 2017)

=== Individual ===
- Most career goals: 249, Cristian Gonzáles (2003 to 2018)
- Most goals in a season: 37, Sylvano Comvalius (2017)
- Most top goalscorer awards: 4, Cristian Gonzáles (2005, 2006, 2007–08, 2008–09)
- Most goals in a game: 6, Ilham Jaya Kesuma (Persita Tangerang 10–1 Persikab Bandung, 28 April 2002)
- Most hat-tricks: 13, Cristian Gonzáles (2003 to 2013)

== Super League – since 2008–09 ==
=== Titles ===
- Most titles: 4, Persib Bandung (2014, 2023–24, 2024–25, 2025–26)
- Most consecutive title wins: 3, Persib Bandung (2023–24, 2024–25, 2025–26)

=== Appearances ===
- Most overall seasons: 17 seasons
  - Arema
  - Madura United (Note: Total seasons including Pelita Jaya FC and Pelita Bandung Raya)
  - Persib Bandung
  - Persija Jakarta
- Most consecutive seasons: 17 seasons (2008–09 to 2026–27)
  - Arema
  - Madura United
  - Persib Bandung
  - Persija Jakarta
- Fewest overall seasons: 1 season
  - Kalteng Putra
  - Persema Malang
  - Persiba Bantul
  - PSAP Sigli

=== Points ===
- Most points in a season: 82, Persipura Jayapura (2013)
- Fewest points in a season: 7, Persegres Gresik United (2017)

=== Wins ===
- Most wins in a season: 25
  - Persipura Jayapura (2008–09, 2013)
  - Sriwijaya (2011–12)
  - Borneo Samarinda (2025–26)
- Fewest wins in a season: 2
  - Persijap Jepara (2014 (Note: 20 games))
  - Persiba Bantul (2014)
  - Persegres Gresik United (2017 (Note: 34 games))
  - Persiraja Banda Aceh (2021–22)
- Most consecutive wins: 11, Borneo Samarinda (8 August 2025 – 22 November 2025)

=== Defeats ===
- Most defeats in a season: 28: Persegres Gresik United (2017)
- Fewest defeats in a season: 2, Persipura Jayapura (2010–11, (Note: 28 games) 2013)

=== Draws ===
- Most draws in a season: 15, Borneo (2019)
- Fewest draws in a season: 2
  - Deltras (2010–11)
  - Persijap Jepara (2014)
  - Bhayangkara (2017)

=== Goals ===
- Most goals scored in a season: 82, Persipura Jayapura (2013)
- Fewest goals scored in a season: 11, Persijap Jepara (2014)
- Most goals conceded in a season: 107, PSPS Pekanbaru (2013)
- Fewest goals conceded in a season: 15, Persija Jakarta (2014)

=== Scorelines ===
- Biggest home win: 8–0
  - Sriwijaya 10–2 Persegres Gresik United (5 November 2017)
  - Persela Lamongan 9–1 PSPS Pekanbaru (12 June 2013)
  - Arema 8–0 Bontang (19 June 2010)
  - Madura United 8–0 Barito Putera (23 July 2022)
- Biggest away win: 8–0
  - Persijap Jepara 0–8 Arema Cronus (5 September 2014)
- Highest scoring: 12 goals
  - Sriwijaya 10–2 Persegres Gresik United (5 November 2017)

=== Individual ===
- First goal:
  - Indonesia Super League era (2008–2015): Ernest Jeremiah Chukwuma (for Persipura Jayapura v. Sriwijaya, 12 July 2008)
  - Liga 1 era (2017–2025): Septian David Maulana (for Mitra Kukar v. Barito Putera, 15 April 2017)
  - Super League era (2025–present): Mariano Peralta (for Borneo Samarinda v. Bhayangkara Presisi, 8 August 2025)
- Most goals:
  - Indonesia Super League era (2008–2015): 110, Boaz Solossa (2008–09 to 2015)
  - Liga 1 era (2017–2025): 104, David da Silva (2018 to 2024–25)
  - Super League era (2025–present): 23, David da Silva
  - All eras: 153, Beto Gonçalves (2008–09 to 2024–25)
- Oldest goalscorer: 43 years 9 months 18 days, Beto Gonçalves (for PSBS Biak v. Semen Padang, 18 October 2024)
- Youngest goalscorer: 17 years 1 month 17 days, Arkhan Kaka (for Persis Solo v. Borneo Samarinda, 19 October 2024)
- Most goals in a season: 37, Sylvano Comvalius (Bali United, 2017)
- Most top goalscorer awards: 3, Boaz Solossa (2008–09, 2010–11, 2013)
- Fastest goal: 9.55 seconds, Pedro Velázquez (for Persija Jakarta v. PSAP Sigli, 18 April 2012) (Note: Okezone claims Velázquez scored a goal after 11.24 seconds.)
- Latest goal: 107th minute, Arkhan Fikri (for Arema v. PSS Sleman, 17 February 2025)
- Most goals in a game: 5
  - Ilija Spasojević (Mitra Kukar 8–2 PSPS Pekanbaru, 15 September 2013)
  - Sylvano Comvalius (Bali United 6–1 Mitra Kukar, 27 August 2017)
  - Flávio Silva (Persik Kediri 5–2 Persikabo 1973, 28 March 2024)
- Most hat-tricks:
  - Indonesia Super League era (2008–2015): 5
    - Boaz Solossa (2008–09 to 2014)
    - Cristian Gonzáles (2008–09 to 2013)
  - Liga 1 era (2017–2025): 6, Alex Martins (2022–23 to 2024–25)
  - All eras: 7, Alex Martins (2022–23 to 2025–26)

== Piala Indonesia (Indonesia's Cup) ==
=== Final ===
- Most wins: 3, Sriwijaya (2007, 2009, 2010)
- Most consecutive wins: 3, Sriwijaya (2007, 2009, 2010)
- Most appearances in finals: 3
  - Sriwijaya (2007, 2009, 2010)
  - Arema (2005, 2006, 2010)
  - Persipura Jayapura (2006, 2007, 2009)
- Most defeats in finals: 3, Persipura Jayapura (2006, 2007, 2009)

=== All rounds ===
- Biggest home win: 9–0
  - Persegi Gianyar 9–0 Persipro Probolinggo (2 June 2005)
  - PSM Makassar 9–0 Perseru Serui (16 February 2019)
- Biggest away win: 14–0
  - PSBI Blitar 0–14 Persebaya Surabaya (2 September 2018)
- Highest scoring: 14 goals
  - PSBI Blitar 0–14 Persebaya Surabaya (2 September 2018)

=== Individual ===
- Most goals in a season: 11, Javier Roca (2005)
- Most goals in a game: 5
  - Fodé Camara (Bontang 8–0 Barito Putera, 15 May 2005)
  - Javier Roca (Persegi Gianyar 9–0 Persipro Probolinggo, 2 June 2005)
  - Cristian Gonzáles (Persik Kediri 7–0 Persikabo Bogor, 8 September 2005)
  - Marko Šimić (Persija Jakarta 8–2 757 Kepri Jaya, 23 January 2019)
- Most hat-tricks: 4, Cristian Gonzáles (2005–2010)

== Managers ==
- Most title wins: 5, Rahmad Darmawan (Persipura Jayapura – 1 title, Sriwijaya – 4 titles)
- Most top-flight League title wins: 4, Jacksen F. Tiago (Persebaya Surabaya – 2004, Persipura Jayapura – 2008–09, 2010–11, 2013)
- Most Piala Indonesia wins: 3, Rahmad Darmawan (Sriwijaya – 2007, 2009, 2010)

== See also ==
- Indonesian football league system
- Super League (Indonesia)
- Liga Indonesia Premier Division
- Piala Indonesia
- List of Indonesian football champions
