= 2013 Persebaya 1927 season =

Persebaya 1927
2013 season
- Owner: PT. Persebaya Indonesia
- President: Saleh Ismail Mukadar
- Headcoach: Ibnu Grahan; Fabio Oliveira
- Stadium: Gelora Bung Tomo Stadium, Surabaya
- Indonesian Premier League: 5th (Disqualified from the league)
- Top goalscorer: Mario Karlovic (10)
- Biggest win: Persebaya 1927 5-0 Bontang F.C.
- Biggest defeat: Semen Padang 3-0 Persebaya 1927

The 2013 season was the 86th season in Persebaya 1927's existence, and became Persebaya 1927's last season in Indonesian Premier League before banned by PSSI. Persebaya 1927 was played in the Indonesian Premier League and finished fifth at the end of the season. The season was not finished and the format was changed to Play-off round.

== Review and events ==
=== Pre–2013 ===
==== August ====
Persebaya Surabaya head coach Divaldo Alves has announced his resignation. Persebaya assistant coach Ibnu Grahan, who has been appointed by Persebaya CEO Gede Widiade, is willing to fill Divaldo's vacancy, provided he gains the trust of management.

==== December ====
Pesebaya Surabaya had to accept defeat in the first match of the 2012 Ternate Mayor's Cup tournament. A goal from Rahmat Rivai made them lose to Persiter Ternate at Gelora Kie Raha (22/12). In the second match, Persebaya defeated PSM Makassar 2-1. However, Persebaya finished last, behind the champions PSM Makassar and Persiter Ternate as a runner-up.

=== February ===
Persebaya Surabaya achieved maximum points in the opening match of the 2013 Indonesian Premier League (IPL) competition after crushing Bontang FC with a landslide score of 5-0 at the Gelora Bung Tomo Stadium, Surabaya, (24/2).

=== July ===
Ibnu Grahan officially submitted his letter of resignation from his position as coach of Persebaya Surabaya.

=== August ===
Persebaya Surabaya has finally appointed a replacement coach for Ibnu Grahan. The Fabio Oliveira-Mursyid Effendi duo will lead the squad nicknamed Bajul Ijo until the end of the 2013 Indonesian Premier League (IPL) season.

== Squad information ==
=== First team squad ===
No.	Name	Nat.	Signed in	Date of Birth (Age)	Signed from
Goalkeepers
31	Endra Prasetya	(Indonesia)	2008	1 May 1981 (age 45)	(Indonesia) Persema Malang
22	Dedi Iman	(Indonesia)	2011	22 July 1985 (age 40)	(Indonesia) Persema Malang
1	Dimas Galih Pratama	(Indonesia)	2011	23 November 1992 (age 33)	(Indonesia) The Academy
Defenders
5	Jefri Prasetyo	(Indonesia)	2011	5 January 1985 (age 41)	(Indonesia) PSIM Yogyakarta
6	Nurmufid Fastabiqul Khoirot	(Indonesia)	2011	25 April 1991 (age 35)	(Indonesia) The Academy
20	Muhammad Aulia Ardli	(Indonesia)	2011	22 November 1990 (age 35)	(Indonesia) The Academy
2	Mat Halil	(Indonesia)	1999	3 July 1979 (age 46)	(Indonesia) The Academy
3	Erol Iba	(Indonesia)	2011	6 August 1979 (age 46)	(Indonesia) Persipura Jayapura
24	Yusuf Hamzah	(Indonesia)	2011	10 February 1985 (age 41)	(Indonesia) PSIM Yogyakarta
16	Goran Gancev	(North Macedonia)	2013	4 August 1983 (age 42)	(Indonesia) PSMS Medan (IPL)
15	Rivelino Ardiles	(Indonesia)	2011	5 May 1986 (age 40)	(Indonesia) Minangkabau F.C.
	Dany Saputra	(Indonesia)	2013	1 January 1991 (age 35)	(Indonesia) Persedikab Kediri
Midfielders
18	Rian Wahyu	(Indonesia)	2011	15 April 1991 (age 35)	(Indonesia) The Academy
8	Muhammad Taufiq	(Indonesia)	2008	29 November 1986 (age 39)	(Indonesia) PSIM Yogyakarta
12	Rendi Irwan	(Indonesia)	2011	26 April 1987 (age 39)	(Indonesia) Mitra Kukar
21	Jusmadi	(Indonesia)	2011	19 October 1983 (age 42)	(Indonesia) Pelita Jaya
29	Mario Karlovic	(Australia)	2011	29 May 1984 (age 41)	(Indonesia) Minangkabau F.C.
41	Feri Ariawan	(Indonesia)	2011	16 May 1986 (age 40)	(Indonesia) Persela Lamongan
30	Ji-ho Han	(South Korea)	2013	11 June 1986 (age 39)	(Indonesia) Persibo Bojonegoro
25	Harry Saputra	(Indonesia)	2012	12 June 1981 (age 44)	(Indonesia) Persibo Bojonegoro
	Trias Budi	(Indonesia)	2013	22 May 1984 (age 41)	(Indonesia) PSPS Pekanbaru
	Misbakus Solikhin	(Indonesia)	2013	1 September 1992 (age 33)	(Indonesia) The Academy
Forwards
	Talaohu Musafri	(Indonesia)	2013	19 February 1982 (age 44)	(Indonesia) Perseman Manokwari
10	Fernando Soler	(Argentina)	2012	24 February 1978 (age 48)	(Indonesia) Persis Solo (LPIS)
9	Aris Alfiansyah	(Indonesia)	2013	10 April 1989 (age 37)	(Indonesia) Persela Lamongan
7	Andik Vermansah	(Indonesia)	2008	23 November 1991 (age 34)	(Indonesia) The Academy

== Competitions ==
=== Regular season ===
Pos	Team	Pld	W	D	L	GF	GA	GD	Pts	Qualification or relegation
1	Semen Padang	16	13	2	1	46	6	+40	41	Get wildcard to advance league verification and 2013 Premier League Final (Note: A PSSI extraordinary congress resulted in a decision to merge the two leagues into one in the 2014 season with a name Super League. Therefore Premier League (IPL) clubs would have 4 teams eligible to appear in the new league, the quota taken from the four best teams in the IPL 2013 season.)
2	Perseman Manokwari	19	12	3	4	39	12	+27	39	Advance to Play-off round
3	Pro Duta	19	11	4	4	33	11	+22	37	Advance to Play-off round
4	Persiba Bantul	18	11	2	5	41	21	+20	35	Advance to Play-off round
5	Persebaya 1927	18	10	4	4	35	19	+16	34	Disqualified from the league (Note: Persebaya 1927 and Arema Indonesia was disqualified as they did not meet the conditions for PSSI membership.)
6	PSM Makassar	18	10	2	6	27	12	+15	32	Advance to Play-off round
7	PSIR Rembang	20	9	4	7	33	42	−9	31	Advance to Play-off round
8	Persijap Jepara	19	9	3	7	32	16	+16	30	Advance to Play-off round
9	Persepar Palangkaraya	21	8	6	7	25	25	0	30	Advance to Play-off round
10	Persiraja Banda Aceh	19	7	4	8	23	28	−5	25	Advance to Play-off round
11	PSLS Lhokseumawe	19	7	4	8	29	34	−5	25	Advance to Play-off round
12	Arema Indonesia	18	5	2	11	19	42	−23	17	Disqualified from the league
13	Bontang FC	18	4	2	12	21	51	−30	14	Advance to Play-off round
14	Persema Malang	15	3	0	12	15	40	−25	9	Disqualified from the league (Note: Persibo Bojonegoro, Persema Malang and Jakarta FC were disqualified for walking out too many matches.)
15	Persibo Bojonegoro	15	2	1	12	6	39	−33	7	Disqualified from the league
16	Jakarta FC	15	1	1	13	11	37	−26	4	Disqualified from the league

Updated to match(es) played on 4 September 2013. Source: IPL Table
Rules for classification: 1) points; 2) goal difference; 3) number of goals scored.
