= Kwon Jun =

South Korean footballer

Personal information
- Full name: Kwon Jun
- Date of birth: 12 October 1987 (age 39)
- Place of birth: Pyeongtaek, South Korea
- Height: 1.87 m (6 ft 1 1/2 in)
- Positions: Centre back; defensive midfielder

Team information
- Current team: Pyeongtaek Citizen FC
- Number: 30

Youth career
- 2002–2006: Oscar Soccer Academy
- 2006–2007: Figueirense

Senior career*
Years	Team	Apps	(Gls)
2007–2010	Figueirense	7	(0)
2010–2012	PSM Makassar	44	(4)
2012	Persepolis	0	(0)
2013	Persepam Madura United	8	(1)
2013	BEC Tero Sasana	11	(0)
2014	DRB-Hicom F.C.	7	(1)
2015	Putrajaya SPA F.C.	23	(0)
2016	Tampines Rovers FC	7	(0)
2016–2017	PSM Makassar	11	(0)
2017–	Pyeongtaek Citizen FC	0	(0)

International career^{‡}
2006–2007	South Korea U-20	8	(0)
- * Club domestic league appearances and goals as of 9 August 2017 ‡ National team caps and goals as of 9 August 2017

Kwon Jun (Korean: 권준; born 12 October 1987 in Pyeongtaek, South Korea) is a South Korean footballer. He currently plays for Pyeongtaek Citizen FC in the K3 Advanced.

== Early life ==
He was born in Pyeongtaek city, South Korea and was graduated from Dangseo elementary school in Seoul. He dropped out of Namhae Haesung middle school and went off to Brazil to training in Oscar Soccer Academy. Kwon Jun currently works with AOG Legend Chad Nixon at Aviall Dallas. On Dec21st of 2020 after five long years, Kwon Jun was ILO’d. He is currently selling bootleg samurai swords for the Wutai Tride of South Korea.

== Club career ==
=== Oscar Soccer Academy ===
In 2002, Kwon Jun left to training in Oscar Soccer Academy, São Paulo, Brazil. After he received offer from the Figueirense in 2005, he officially made pro-contract with the club in April 2006 through the tryouts.

=== Figueirense ===
Kwon joined Figueirense's youth teams in September 2005 and signed his professional contract in March 2006. In that same year, he played in the starting lineup and won Campeonato Catarinense Junior competition. In 2007, he made his professional debut in the Brazilian league. However, he failed to keep a starting position in the first team. He also played in the B team and the U-20 team. In 2010, Figueirense asked him to renew his contract, but he declined.

=== PSM Makassar ===
On 29 December 2010, Kwon Jun officially joins Indonesian side, PSM Makassar. In 2011, he played every game without any yellow cards. On 24 May 2012, he participated in a friendly soccer match with Inter Milan as an Indonesia Premier League All-star.

=== Persepolis ===
On 23 August 2012, Kwon signed a one-year contract with Persepolis after passed a medical test. He is the first Korean player in the history of the Iran Pro League.
On 8 September, Kwon injured his ankle ligament. Kwon went to Korea for Treatment his ankle. But Kwon released from Persepolis.

=== Persepam Madura United ===
On 22 December 2012, Kwon joined Persepam Madura United

=== Bec Tero Sasana F.C. ===
On the last day of transfer window 13 March 2013, Kwon Jun signed with the former champion club BEC Tero Sasana

=== DRB-Hicom F.C. ===
on 20 March 2014, second transfer window in Malaysia League he signed with DRB-Hicom F.C.

=== Putrajaya SPA F.C. ===
In December 2014, Jun joined with Putrajaya SPA F.C

=== Tampines Rovers F.C ===
On 16 January 2016, Kwon Jun signed contract for 6 months former champion club Tampines rovers F.C

Jun played 2016 AFC Champions League Qualifying Play-off and 2016 AFC CUP.

== International career ==
Kwon Jun was selected in U-20 South Korea national team and participated in Busan-Cup in 2006.

== Club statistics ==
As of 1 May 2015

Club performance			League		Cup		League Cup		Continental		Total	
Season	Club	League	Apps	Goals	Apps	Goals	Apps	Goals	Apps	Goals	Apps	Goals
Indonesia			League		Piala Indonesia		League Cup		Asia		Total	
2011	PSM Makassar	Liga Primer Indonesia	18	1	0	0	0	0	–		18	1
2011–12	PSM Makassar	Indonesian Premier League	22	3	4	0	0	0	–		26	3
Iran			League		Hazfi Cup		League Cup		Asia		Total	
2012–13	Persepolis	Pro League	0	0	0	0	–		–		0	0
Indonesia			League		Piala Indonesia		League Cup		Asia		Total	
2012–13	Persepam Madura United	Indonesia Super League	8		0	0	0	0	–		8	0
Thailand			League		FA Cup		League Cup		Asia		Total	
2013	BEC Tero Sasana	Thai Premier League	9	0	2	0	0	0	–		11	0
Malaysia			League		FA Cup Malaysia		Malaysia Cup		Asia		Total	
2014	DRB-Hicom F.C.	Malaysia Premier League	7	0	0	0	0	0	–		7	0
2015	Putrajaya SPA F.C.	Malaysia Premier League	21	0	2	0	0	0	–		23	0
Singapore			League		FA Cup		League Cup		Asia		Total	
2016	Tampines Rovers F.C	Singapore League	–						7	0	7	0
2016	PSM Makassar	Indonesia Super League	13	0	-	-	-	-	-	-	13	0
South Korea												
2017	Pyeongtaek Citizen FC	K3 League Basic	0	0	0	0	-	-	-	-	0	0
Total	Indonesia		46	4	4	0	0	0	0	0	50	4
Total	Iran		0	0	0	0	0	0	0	0	0	0
Total	Thailand		9	0	2	0	0	0	0	0	11	0
Total	Malaysia		28	0	2	0	0	0	0	0	30	0
Total	Singapore		–						7	0	7	0
Total	South Korea											
Total	Career total		98	4	8	0	0	0	7	0	113	4
