= Nurul Zikra =

Indonesian footballer

Personal information
- Full name: Nurul Zikra
- Date of birth: 21 July 1991 (age 35)
- Place of birth: Aceh Besar, Indonesia
- Height: 1.78 m (5 ft 10 in)
- Position: Forward

Senior career*
Years	Team	Apps	(Gls)
2011–2012	PSAB Aceh Besar		
2012–2014	Persiraja Banda Aceh	6	(3)
2017	Aceh United		
2018	PSAB Aceh Besar		
2019	Persiraja Banda Aceh	13	(0)
- * Club domestic league appearances and goals as of 30 August 2019 ‡ National team caps and goals as of 30 August 2019

Nurul Zikra (born 21 July 1991) is an Indonesian footballer who plays as a forward. in Liga 2, rejoined the club from PSAB Aceh Besar. He had played for Persiraja before, when Persiraja were competing in Indonesian Premier League in 2013 season, the highest tier in Indonesian football league system at that time.
