= Hengky Ardiles =

Indonesian footballer (born 1981)

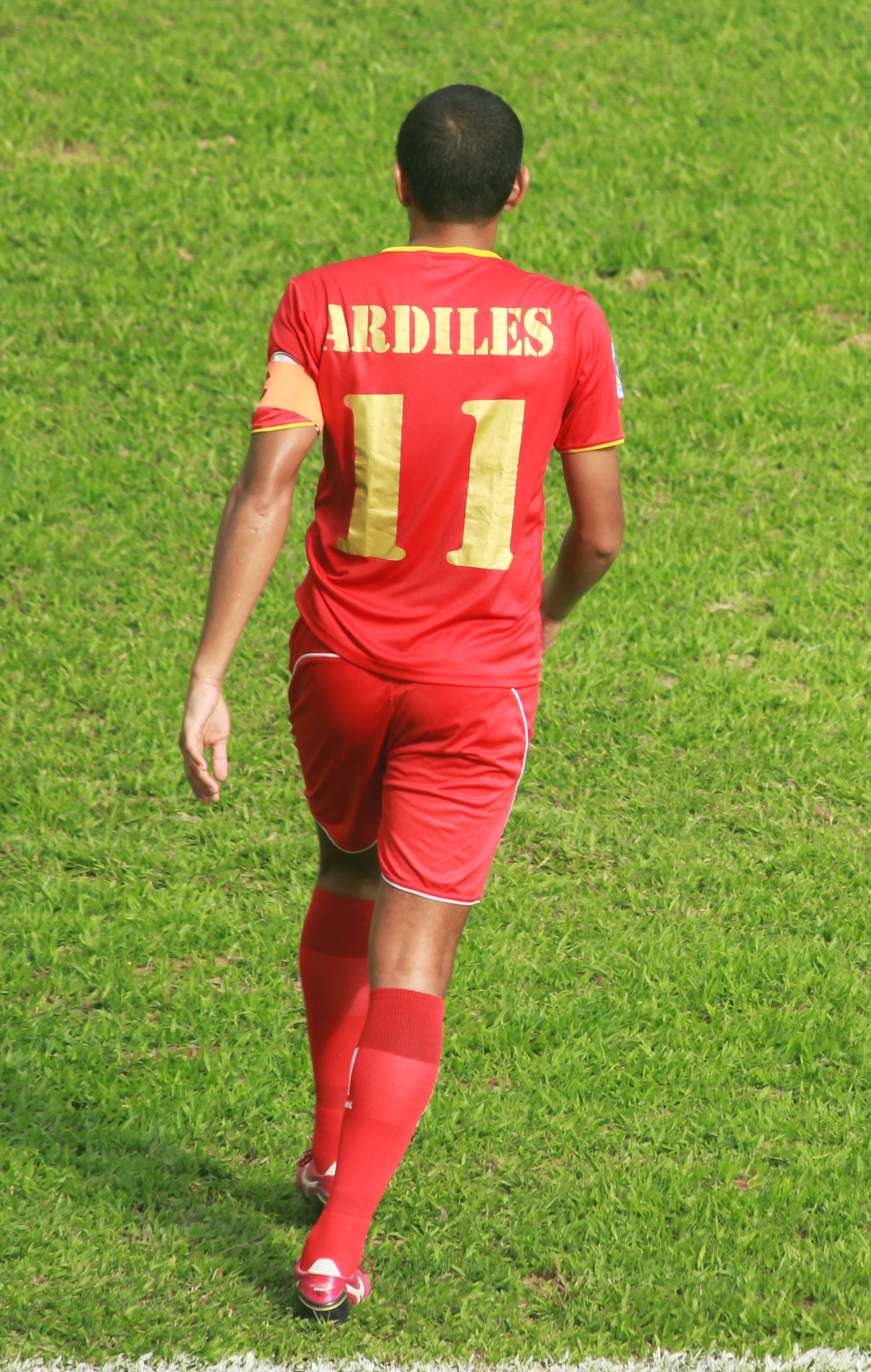
- Ardiles playing for Semen Padang in 2013

Personal information
- Full name: Hengky Ardiles
- Date of birth: 20 May 1981 (age 45)
- Place of birth: Padang Panjang, Indonesia
- Height: 1.75 m (5 ft 9 in)
- Position: Right-back

Team information
- Current team: Semen Padang (assistant coach)

Senior career*
Years	Team	Apps	(Gls)
2000–2006	Semen Padang	118	(6)
2006–2008	Persikabo Bogor	57	(0)
2008–2018	Semen Padang	190	(2)
Total		365	(8)

International career
2003	Indonesia U23	3	(0)
2012	Indonesia	5	(0)

Managerial career
- 2021–: Semen Padang (assistant coach)
- * Club domestic league appearances and goals

Hengky Ardiles (born 20 May 1981) is a former Indonesian professional footballer who played as a right-back and is currently the assistant coach of Semen Padang.

== International career ==
He made his international debut against Bahrain on 29 February 2012.

== Honours ==
=== Club ===
Semen Padang

- Indonesia Premier League (1): 2011–12
- Indonesian Community Shield (1): 2013
- Piala Indonesia runner-up: 2012
- Liga 2 runner-up: 2018

=== Individual ===
- Indonesia Premier League Best Player (1): 2011–12
