= Hendri =

Hendri is an Indonesian name. Notable people with the name include:

- Hendri Susilo Pramono (born 1979), Indonesian tennis player
- Hendri Saputra (born 1981), Indonesian-born Singaporean badminton player
- Hendri Satriadi (born 1992), Indonesian footballer
- Hendri Septa (born 1976), Indonesian politician
