= Kidega =

Kidega is a surname. Notable people with the surname include:

- Daniel Kidega (born 1973), Ugandan politician
- Jimmy Kidega (born 1982), Ugandan footballer
