= David Pagbe =

Cameroonian footballer

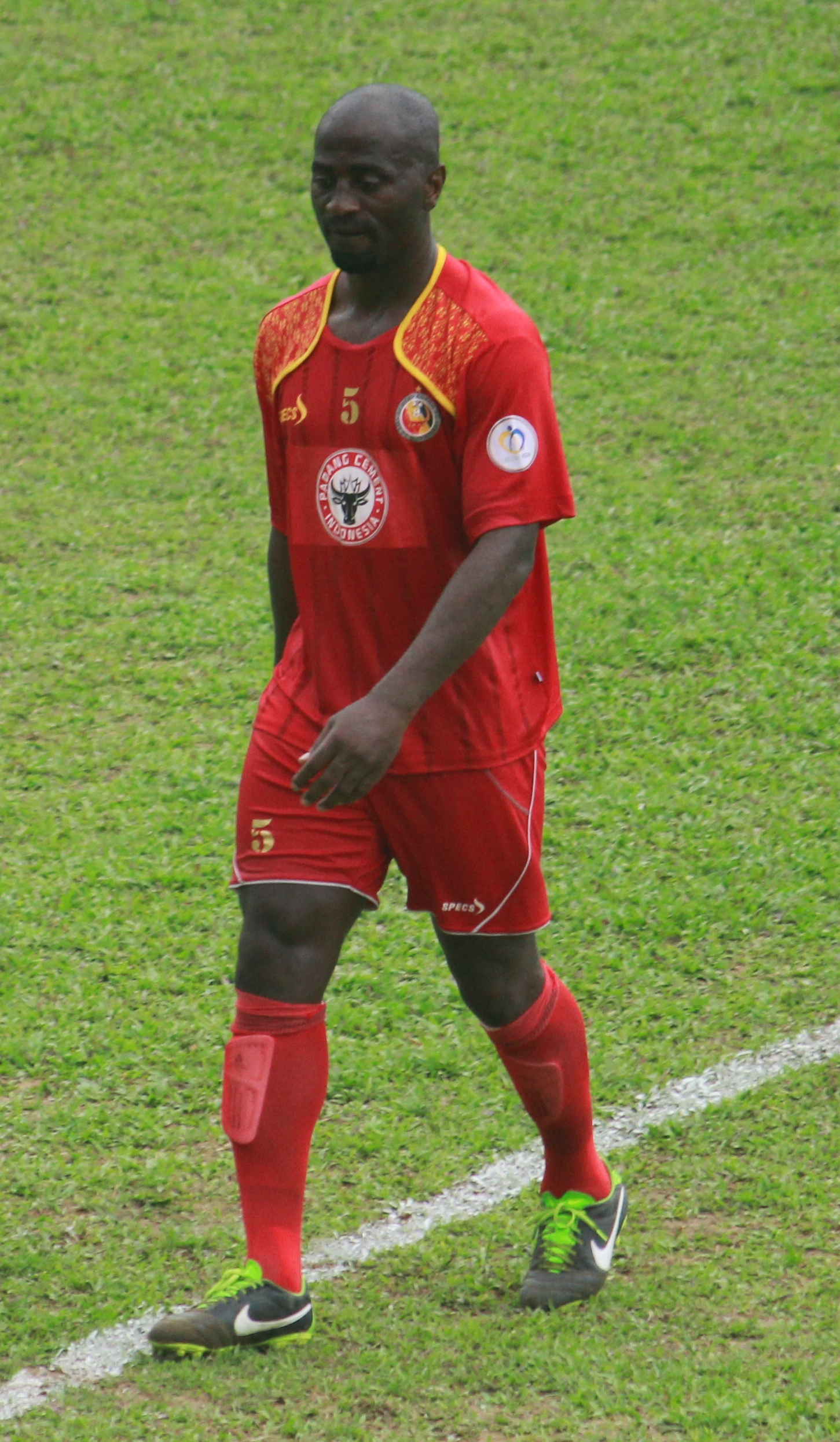
- Pagbe with Semen Padang in 2013

Personal information
- Full name: David Ngan Pagbe
- Date of birth: October 18, 1980 (age 46)
- Place of birth: Yaoundé, Cameroon
- Height: 1.85 m (6 ft 1 in)
- Position: Defender

Senior career*
Years	Team	Apps	(Gls)
2000–2005	Canon Yaoundé	12	(1)
2005–2007	Penang	20	(1)
2007–2010	Persikabo Bogor	55	(4)
2010–2015	Semen Padang	88	(7)
2015–2016	Persela Lamongan	14	(1)
2016–2017	Persib Bandung	4	(0)
- * Club domestic league appearances and goals as of 12:40, 14 November 2015 (UTC)

David Pagbe (born October 18, 1980 in Yaoundé, Cameroon) is a Cameroonian former footballer who played as a center back.

== Career ==
On November 3, 2014, he was released by Semen Padang. In January 2015, he was signed by Persela Lamongan. On December 20, 2015, he joined Persib Bandung

== Honours ==
Semen Padang

- Indonesia Premier League: 2011–12
- Indonesian Community Shield: 2013
- Piala Indonesia runner-up: 2012
