= 2004 Liga Indonesia Premier Division =

Liga Indonesia Premier Division
- Season: 2004
- Dates: 4 January – 23 December 2004
- Champions: Persebaya; 2nd Premier Division title 6th Indonesian title
- AFC Champions League: Persebaya Surabaya; PSM
- Matches: 306
- Goals: 713 (2.33 per match)
- Top goalscorer: Ilham Jaya Kesuma (22 goals)
- Biggest home win: Persija 6–1 Semen Padang (7 January); Persikota 6–1 PSPS (7 January); Persik 5–0 Deltras (18 February); Persipura 6–1 Deltras (3 March); Persebaya 5–0 Semen Padang (6 March); Persebaya 5–0 Persikota (25 April); Persija 5–0 Deltras (27 May)
- Biggest away win: Persela 0–4 Persebaya (6 May)
- Highest scoring: PSM 6–2 PSS (19 August)

The 2004 Liga Indonesia Premier Division (also known as the Liga Bank Mandiri for sponsorship reasons) was the tenth season of the Liga Indonesia Premier Division, the top Indonesian professional league for association football clubs. The season began on 4 January and ended on 23 December.

== Teams ==
=== Team changes ===
==== Relegated from Premier Division ====
- Arema
- Barito Putera
- Perseden
- Petrokimia Putra
- PSDS

==== Promoted to Premier Division ====
- Persebaya
- PSMS
- Persela
Locations of the teams in the 2004 Liga Indonesia Premier Division.

=== Stadiums and locations ===
Team	Location	Stadium	Capacity
Bontang PKT	Bontang	Mulawarman	12,000
Deltras	Sidoarjo	Gelora Delta	35,000
Pelita Krakatau Steel	Cilegon	Krakatau Steel	5,000
Persebaya	Surabaya	Gelora 10 November	20,000
Persela	Lamongan	Surajaya	16,000
Persib	Bandung	Siliwangi	15,000
Persija	Jakarta	Lebak Bulus Stadium	12,500
Persijatim Solo	Surakarta	Manahan	20,000
Persik	Kediri	Brawijaya	20,000
Persikota	Tangerang	Benteng	15,000
Persipura	Jayapura	Mandala	30,000
Persita	Tangerang	Benteng	15,000
PSIS	Semarang	Jatidiri	25,000
PSM	Ujung Pandang	Andi Mattalata	15,000
PSMS	Medan	Teladan	20,000
PSPS	Pekanbaru	Kaharudin Nasution	30,000
PSS	Sleman	Tridadi	12,000
Semen Padang	Padang	Haji Agus Salim	20,000

== League standings ==
Pos	Team	Pld	W	D	L	GF	GA	GD	Pts	Qualification
1	Persebaya (C)	34	17	10	7	55	26	+29	61	Qualification for the AFC Champions League
2	PSM	34	17	10	7	46	28	+18	61	Qualification for the AFC Champions League
3	Persija	34	18	6	10	49	30	+19	60	
4	PSS	34	14	11	9	39	37	+2	53	
5	Persikota	34	14	8	12	48	41	+7	50	
6	Persib	34	12	13	9	38	37	+1	49	
7	PSMS	34	14	5	15	34	37	−3	47	
8	Persita	34	13	7	14	45	40	+5	46	
9	Persik	34	14	4	16	41	39	+2	46	
10	PSIS	34	12	10	12	35	34	+1	46	
11	Bontang PKT	34	12	9	13	40	42	−2	45	
12	Persela	34	13	5	16	39	53	−14	44	
13	Persipura	34	11	10	13	39	43	−4	43	
14	Persijatim	34	11	9	14	35	43	−8	42	
15	Semen Padang	34	11	8	15	32	48	−16	41	
16	PSPS	34	10	10	14	35	41	−6	40	
17	Pelita Krakatau Steel	34	10	9	15	32	36	−4	39	
18	Deltras	34	9	4	21	31	58	−27	31	

Source: RSSSF
(C) Champions

== Results ==
Home \ Away	DLTA	PKS	PSBYA	PSL	PSB	PSJ	SOL	PSIK	PSKOTA	PPR	PSTA	PSIS	PSM	PSMS	PSPS	PSS	PKT	SPDG
Deltras			0–1	0–1								3–4				0–0		
Pelita Krakatau Steel										0–1	3–0		2–0					1–1
Persebaya Surabaya							5–1	2–0		4–1			1–1					
Persela Lamongan							3–1	1–0		2–1			1–1					
Persib Bandung	2–0													1–0	1–1		3–1	
Persija Jakarta										3–1	2–2		1–0					6–1
Persijatim Solo FC	1–0	1–1				2–1								1–0	2–0		1–0	
Persik Kediri	5–0													3–0			1–2	
Persikota Kota Tangerang	3–0													1–0	6–1		3–0	
Persipura Jayapura					3–1		1–1	2–0	0–0									
Persita Tangerang					2–2				1–2					3–0	1–2			
PSIS Semarang			0–0	3–0						1–0	2–2		0–2					2–0
PSM Makassar							2–1	2–0										
PSMS Medan												2–0				1–0		
PSPS																		
PSS																		
PKT																		
SPDG																		

Source: RSSSF
Legend: Blue = home team win; Yellow = draw; Red = away team win.

== Awards ==
=== Top scorers ===
This is a list of the top scorers from the 2004 season.

Rank	Player	Club	Goals
1	(Indonesia) Ilham Jaya Kesuma	Persita	22
2	(Guinea) Camara Fode	PKT Bontang	20
3	(Indonesia) Aliyudin	Persikota	18
3	(Liberia) Joe Nagbe	PSPS	18
5	(Argentina) Emanuel De Porras	Persija	16
6	(Brazil) Marcelo Braga	PSS	15
6	(Chile) Cristian Carassco	Persebaya	15

=== Best player ===
(Indonesia) Ponaryo Astaman (PSM)
