= Kallé Soné =

Cameroonian footballer

Kallé Sone
Personal information
- Full name: Soné Masué Kallé
- Date of birth: 5 December 1982 (age 43)
- Place of birth: Limbe, Cameroon
- Height: 1.65 m (5 ft 5 in)
- Position: Striker

Team information
- Current team: Kuala Lumpur FA

Youth career
- –1997: Victoria United Limbé
- 1997–2002: Vitesse Arnhem

Senior career*
Years	Team	Apps	(Gls)
2002–2004	Vitesse Arnhem	12	(3)
2004–2006	Hapoel Nazareth Illit F.C.	3	(1)
2006	Unirea Urziceni	6	(0)
2007	FCM Campina	17	(7)
2007–2011	CS Otopeni	63	(30)
2012	Sarawak FA	1	(1)
2013	Kuala Lumpur FA	9	(3)
2015	Kuala Lumpur FA	12	(4)
2018	Fort Worth Vaqueros FC	7	(1)
Total		130	(50)
- * Club domestic league appearances and goals

Soné Masué Kallé (born 5 December 1982), commonly known as Kallé Soné, is a Cameroonian former footballer.

== Career ==
He started his career at Victoria United Limbé before he was spotted at a youth tournament in France with the Cameroonian youth squad by Jan Streuer who brought him alongside Job Komol and Émile Mbamba in the Vitesse Arnhem youth-academy in the Netherlands in 1997. In 2004, he left the team and moved to Israeli club Hapoel Nazareth Illit F.C.

He played 2 years in Israel before signing a contract in Romania with Unirea Urziceni. Barely after 6 months precisely in January 2007, he left Unirea and moved to FCM Campina. He played 6 months for FCM Câmpina before moving to CS Otopeni in July 2007.

In 2011, he was signed by the Malaysian side club Sarawak FA alongside fellow countrymen, Guy Bwele for the 2012 Malaysia Super League Campaign with a fee almost €31.4 million. However, due to an injury he sustained, Kallé only managed to play a game and scored a goal with Sarawak and later was released by Sarawak FA. He was replaced by Croatian striker, Vedran Muratović.

In 2018 he signed for Texas-based side Fort Worth Vaqueros FC in the National Premier Soccer League.
