= Job Komol =

Cameroonian footballer

Job Jean Black Komol Ngolo Boue Kouch (born 1 December 1981 in Douala) is a Cameroonian former professional footballer who played as a defender.

Komol played at Rail FC in Douala and was spotted at a youth tournament in France with the Cameroonian youth squad by Jan Streuer who brought him alongside Émile Mbamba and Soné Masué Kallé in the Vitesse Arnhem youth academy in the Netherlands in 1997. Komol was doing well in the youth and in the second team and he was training with the first team. On 15 November 2000, Vitesse chairman, Jos Vaessen, announced that Komol tested positive for HIV. Komol was the first player in Dutch football with HIV and this caused a shock. Clubs started testing their players and questions arose over whether the disease could be transmitted during the game. Komol's playing license was suspended by the KNVB. Research showed that the risk of transmission during the game was less than 0.1% in Komol's case.

He was allowed to play again but the treatment of his disease prevented him from making the Vitesse team again. Because of his disease, Komol was granted permanent residency in The Netherlands. In 2005, he had an unsuccessful trial at Go Ahead Eagles and he played in the 2007–08 season at De Bataven in the Hoofdklasse. In 2008, he started playing at lower amateur side SMC and since 2010, he played at VV Erica'76, which merged to VV Dieren in 2012.
