= Moses Oloya =

Ugandan footballer (born 1992)

Personal information
- Date of birth: 22 October 1992 (age 34)
- Place of birth: Kampala, Uganda
- Height: 1.83 m (6 ft 0 in)
- Position: Midfielder

Team information
- Current team: Haiphong
- Number: 8

Senior career*
Years	Team	Apps	(Gls)
2009–2010	Kampala Capital City Authority		
2011–2013	Xuan Thanh Saigon	36	(5)
2014–2016	Becamex Binh Duong	52	(8)
2016–2017	Kuban Krasnodar	12	(1)
2017–2021	Hanoi	78	(2)
2022	Haiphong	23	(0)
2023	Becamex Binh Duong	7	(0)
2025	Wakiso Giants	12	(1)
2026–	Haiphong	1	(0)

International career^{‡}
2011–2017	Uganda	47	(0)
- * Club domestic league appearances and goals as of 9 February 2026 ‡ National team caps and goals as of 23 March 2018

Moses Oloya (born 22 October 1992) is a Ugandan professional footballer who plays as a midfielder for V.League 1 club Haiphong.

== Early and personal life ==
Oloya's brother is Jimmy Kidega, who also played international football for Uganda.

== Club career ==
Oloya has played club football in Uganda, Vietnam and Russia for Kampala Capital City Authority, Xuan Thanh Sai Gon, Becamex Binh Duong, Kuban Krasnodar and Hanoi FC.

He signed for Haiphong for the 2022 season. He signed for Becamex Binh Duong for the 2023 season.

In February 2026, Oloya returned to Haiphong.

== International career ==
He made his international debut for Uganda in 2011, and has appeared in FIFA World Cup qualifying matches. He was a member of Uganda's squad at the 2017 Africa Cup of Nations.

=== International career statistics ===
As of 23 March 2018

Uganda national team
Year	Apps	Goals
2011	8	0
2012	11	0
2013	4	0
2014	10	0
2015	2	0
2016	8	0
2017	4	0
Total	47	0
