= Émile Mbamba =

Cameroonian footballer

Personal information
- Full name: Émile Bertrand Mbamba
- Date of birth: 27 October 1982 (age 44)
- Place of birth: Yaoundé, Cameroon
- Height: 1.78 m (5 ft 10 in)
- Position: Forward

Senior career*
Years	Team	Apps	(Gls)
2000–2004	Vitesse Arnhem	83	(23)
2004–2006	Maccabi Tel Aviv	27	(3)
2005–2006	→ Maccabi Petah Tikva (loan)	16	(9)
2006–2007	Vitória Setúbal	18	(7)
2007–2008	Arema Malang	24	(15)
2009	Daegu FC	8	(0)
2009–2010	Botev Plovdiv	20	(11)
2010–2011	Potros Neza	9	(5)
2011	Bontang FC	17	(8)
2011–2012	Persema Malang	19	(10)
2012–2013	Persepar Palangkaraya	25	(16)
2014–2015	Persiba Bantul	18	(5)
2015–2016	Bhayangkara	10	(0)
2016	Persela lamongan		
2016	Gresik United		

International career
- Cameroon U17
- Cameroon U20
- Cameroon U23
- * Club domestic league appearances and goals

Émile Bertrand Mbamba (born 27 October 1982) is a Cameroonian former footballer who played as a forward. He played for Vitesse Arnhem, Maccabi Tel Aviv, Maccabi Petah Tikva, Vitória Setúbal, Arema, Daegu FC and Botev Plovdiv.

== Club career ==
=== Vitesse ===
He was spotted at a youth tournament in France with the Cameroonian youth squad by Jan Streuer who brought him alongside Job Komol and Soné Masué Kallé in the Vitesse Arnhem youth-academy in The Netherlands in 1997. He played four years in the Eredivisie before he left for Israel in 2004.

=== Maccabi Tel-Aviv ===
Emile signed Maccabi Tel-aviv at the summer 2004.

=== Arema Malang ===
Mbamba scored his first goal for Arema Malang on 9 September 2007. In fact, he even scored two goals in that match against another Liga Indonesia contestant Deltras Sidoarjo.

=== Daegu FC ===
He was moved to Daegu FC on 24 February 2009 but made a 7 appearances after released on 30 June 2009.

=== Botev Plovdiv ===
On 3 October 2009, Mbamba signed a contract with Bulgarian Botev Plovdiv

== Honours ==
Maccabi Tel Aviv

- State Cup: 2004–05
