= Jimmy Kidega =

Ugandan footballer (born 1982)

Personal information
- Full name: James Jimmy Kidega
- Date of birth: 16 August 1982 (age 44)
- Place of birth: Jinja, Uganda
- Height: 1.80 m (5 ft 11 in)
- Position: Midfielder

Senior career*
Years	Team	Apps	(Gls)
2001	SC Villa		
2002–2004	Express		
2005–2008	Rayon Sports		
2008	La Passe		
2008–2010	Rayon Sports		
2010–2011	Gulu United		
2011–2012	Uganda Revenue Authority		
2012	Chanthaburi		
2013	Bontang		

International career
2003–2008	Uganda	2	(0)
- * Club domestic league appearances and goals

James Jimmy Kidega (born 16 August 1982) is an Ugandan former footballer who played as a midfielder.

== Early and personal life ==
Born in Jinja, his brother is Moses Oloya, who also played international football for Uganda.

== Career ==
Kidega played club football for SC Villa, Express, Rayon Sports, La Passe, Gulu United, Uganda Revenue Authority, Chanthaburi and Bontang. He also earned two caps for the Ugandan national team.
