= Fassawa Camara =

Guinean footballer

Personal information
- Full name: Fassawa Camara
- Date of birth: 10 January 1983 (age 43)
- Place of birth: Conakry, Guinea
- Height: 1.80 m (5 ft 11 in)
- Position: Midfielder

Senior career*
Years	Team	Apps	(Gls)
2006–2008	Persiwa Wamena	26	(3)
2009–2010	PSIR Rembang	18	(1)
2010–2011	Persebaya DU	13	(1)
2011–2012	Bontang	22	(8)
2013	PSLS Lhokseumawe	21	(3)
2014	PSM Makassar	2	(0)
2019	Martapura	1	(0)
Total		103	(21)
- * Club domestic league appearances and goals as of 21:27, 24 October 2019 (UTC)

Fassawa Camara (born January 10, 1983) is a Guinean former footballer who last played as a midfielder for Liga 2 club Martapura.

== Career ==
=== Martapura ===
He was signed for Martapura to play in Liga 2 in the 2019 season. Camara made 1 league appearance and did not score a goal for Martapura.

== Personal life ==
Born and raised in Guinea, he acquired Indonesian citizenship in 2019.
