= Hendri Satriadi =

Indonesian footballer

Personal information
- Full name: Hendri Satriadi
- Date of birth: 3 May 1992 (age 34)
- Place of birth: Enrekang, Indonesia
- Height: 1.70 m (5 ft 7 in)
- Position: Winger

Senior career*
Years	Team	Apps	(Gls)
2013	Bontang	11	(4)
2014–2015	Persiba Balikpapan	7	(0)
2016–2017	Persegres Gresik United	17	(1)
2017	Persiba Balikpapan	9	(1)
2017	Persijap Jepara	5	(2)
2018–2019	PSIM Yogyakarta	25	(4)
2019	Sriwijaya	14	(1)
2021–2022	Persijap Jepara	17	(0)
2023	Bekasi City	0	(0)
2023–2024	Persijap Jepara	3	(0)
- * Club domestic league appearances and goals as of 13 December 2023

Hendri Satriadi (born 3 May 1992) is an Indonesian professional footballer who plays as a winger.

== Club career ==
=== Persegres Gresik ===
He made his professional debut against Persela Lamongan in the first week of the 2016 Indonesia Soccer Championship A.
