= Edward Junior Wilson =

Liberian footballer

Edward Wilson
Personal information
- Full name: Edward Junior Wilson
- Date of birth: 22 September 1984 (age 42)
- Place of birth: Monrovia, Liberia
- Height: 1.80 m (5 ft 11 in)
- Position: Striker

Senior career*
Years	Team	Apps	(Gls)
2005–2008	Mighty Barrolle	55	(25)
2008–2014	Semen Padang	105	(100)
2014–2015	Felda United	28	(26)
2015–2016	Perlis FA	11	(11)
2016	Persipura Jayapura	28	(10)

International career
2006–2015	Liberia	28	(19)
- * Club domestic league appearances and goals

Edward Junior Wilson (born 22 September 1984) is a Liberian former footballer who played as a forward. He was also a member of the Liberia national team. Made his international debut in 2005. He was the top scorer in Liga Indonesia Premier Division in the 2009–10 season with 20 goals.

== Honors ==
Semen Padang

- Indonesia Premier League: 2011–12
- Indonesian Community Shield: 2013
- Piala Indonesia runner-up: 2012

Individual

- Liga Indonesia Premier Division Top Goalscorer: 2009–10
