= Anam Syahrul Fitrianto =

Indonesian footballer

Personal information
- Full name: Anam Syahrul Fitrianto
- Date of birth: 30 August 1985 (age 41)
- Place of birth: Jepara, Indonesia
- Height: 1.79 m (5 ft 10 1/2 in)
- Position: Defender

Senior career*
Years	Team	Apps	(Gls)
2005–2007	Persis Solo	31	(0)
2007–2009	Persiba Balikpapan	37	(0)
2009–2012	Persijap Jepara	48	(0)
2013–2016	PSIS Semarang	39	(0)
2017–2018	Persis Solo	28	(0)
Total		183	(0)
- * Club domestic league appearances and goals

Anam Syahrul Fitrianto (born 30 August 1985) is an Indonesian former footballer.
