= Walter Brizuela =

Argentine footballer

Personal information
- Full name: Walter Brizuela Benitez
- Date of birth: February 16, 1981 (age 45)
- Place of birth: Capital Federal, Argentina
- Height: 1.77 m (5 ft 9 1/2 in)
- Position: Midfielder

Senior career*
| Years | Team | Apps | (Gls) |
| 2001–2002 | San Lorenzo de Almagro | 3 | (0) |
| 2003–2004 | Almagro | 25 | (0) |
| 2004–2005 | La Plata FC | 37 | (0) |
| 2005–2006 | All Boys | 27 | (1) |
| 2006–2007 | San Telmo | 33 | (0) |
| 2007–2008 | Flandria | 34 | (1) |
| 2008–2009 | Estudiantes | 12 | (0) |
| 2009–2010 | Flandria | 29 | (1) |
| 2010–2011 | Pelita Jaya | 24 | (3) |
| 2011–2012 | Deltras | 24 | (1) |
| 2012 | Persebaya 1927 | 27 | (1) |
| 2013 | Persijap Jepara | 24 | (3) |
| 2014 | Pro Duta | 12 | (0) |
- * Club domestic league appearances and goals as of 22 March 2012

Walter Brizuela Benitez (born February 16, 1981, in Capital Federal, Argentina) is an Argentine former footballer who plays as a midfielder.
