= Márcio Souza (footballer) =

Brazilian footballer (born 1980)

Personal information
- Full name: Márcio Souza da Silva
- Date of birth: 14 January 1980 (age 46)
- Place of birth: São João de Meriti, Rio de Janeiro, Brazil
- Height: 1.82 m (5 ft 11 1/2 in)
- Position: Forward

Senior career*
| Years | Team | Apps | (Gls) |
| 2006−2008 | Persela Lamongan | 66 | (41) |
| 2008−2009 | Semen Padang | 17 | (9) |
| 2009−2010 | Deltras Sidoarjo | 22 | (14) |
| 2010−2011 | Arema | 15 | (8) |
| 2011−2012 | Persib Bandung | 15 | (7) |
| 2012−2013 | Perseman Manokwari | 14 | (8) |
| 2013–2014 | Terengganu | 12 | (3) |
| Total | | 161 | (90) |
- * Club domestic league appearances and goals

Márcio Souza da Silva (born 14 January 1980) is a Brazilian former footballer. After previously playing for two years in Persela Lamongan, in the 2009/2010 season, he played second-level competition with Semen Padang in Indonesia, when his club won third place and promotion to the Indonesia Super League. On 4 April 2012, he joined Persib Bandung.

On 6 July 2016, Márcio Souza was arrested in Belford Roxo, Rio de Janeiro for match fixing in Brazil.
