= Ezequiel González (footballer, born 1983) =

Argentine footballer

Personal information
- Full name: Ezequiel González
- Date of birth: January 24, 1983 (age 43)
- Place of birth: La Plata, Argentina
- Height: 1.82 m (5 ft 11 1/2 in)
- Position: Forward

Senior career*
Years	Team	Apps	(Gls)
2003–2005	Estudiantes de La Plata	14	(1)
2006–2013	Persiba Bantul	136	(68)
2013–2014	Semen Padang	15	(1)
2014–2015	Persiba Bantul	12	(2)
- * Club domestic league appearances and goals as of 19 April 2015

Ezequiel González (born January 24, 1983) is an Argentine former footballer who plays as a forward.

== Honours ==
=== Club honors ===
Persiba Bantul

- Liga Indonesia Premier Division : 2010-11
