= Guy Mamoun =

Cameroonian footballer

Personal information
- Full name: Guy Bertrand Ngon Mamoun
- Date of birth: November 4, 1983 (age 43)
- Place of birth: Metet, Yaoundé, Cameroon
- Height: 1.80 m (5 ft 11 in)
- Position: Midfielder

Senior career*
Years	Team	Apps	(Gls)
1999–2000	Tonnerre Yaoundé	19	(6)
2000–2001	Cintra Yaoundé	15	(6)
2001–2003	Al-Shabab Al-Arabi	21	(9)
2003–2004	Al-Arabi	20	(4)
2004–2006	Sint-Truidense	18	(7)
2006–2009	Visé	17	(7)
2009–2010	Turnhout	21	(8)
2010–2013	Persema Malang	58	(14)
2013–2014	Gresik United	15	(4)
2014–2015	Persik Kediri	18	(10)
- * Club domestic league appearances and goals as of 02:12, 13 September 2014 (UTC)

Guy Bertrand Ngon Mamoun (born November 4, 1983, in Metet, Yaoundé) is a Cameroonian former footballer who plays as a midfielder.
