= Flávio Silva =

Bissau-Guinean footballer (born 1996)

Personal information
- Full name: Flávio António da Silva
- Date of birth: 3 April 1996 (age 30)
- Place of birth: Bissau, Guinea-Bissau
- Height: 1.85 m (6 ft 1 in)
- Position: Forward

Team information
- Current team: Kaizer Chiefs
- Number: 77

Youth career
- 2008–2011: Real
- 2011–2014: Sporting CP
- 2014: Sacavenense

Senior career*
Years	Team	Apps	(Gls)
2014–2015	Torreense	11	(8)
2015–2016	Benfica B	3	(0)
2015–2016	→ Covilhã (loan)	0	(0)
2016–2018	União da Madeira	38	(7)
2018–2020	Mafra	47	(6)
2020–2021	Alverca	6	(0)
2021	Real	16	(5)
2021–2022	Amora	14	(0)
2022–2023	Mondercange	6	(0)
2023–2024	Persik Kediri	45	(30)
2024–2025	Persebaya Surabaya	33	(9)
2025–	Kaizer Chiefs	23	(9)

International career^{‡}
2012	Portugal U16	3	(0)
2015	Portugal U19	3	(2)
2026–	Guinea-Bissau	1	(0)
- * Club domestic league appearances and goals as of 1 August 2026 ‡ National team caps and goals as of 15:21, 24 April 2026 (UTC)

Flávio António da Silva (born 3 April 1996) is a Bissau-Guinean professional footballer who plays as a forward for South African Premiership club Kaizer Chiefs. A former youth international for Portugal, he plays for the Guinea-Bissau national team.

== Club career ==
Born in Bissau, Guinea-Bissau, Silva started his career in Portugal at Real, later joining Sporting CP and Torreense. In the 2014–15 season, Silva scored 8 goals in 11 matches for the Torreense senior team in the third tier, before leaving the club in the winter transfer window.

On 1 February 2015, Silva signed for Portuguese champions Benfica until June 2020, being assigned to the reserve team. On 8 February, Silva debuted for Benfica B in Segunda Liga, as a substitute.

On 31 August 2015, Silva was loaned out to Covilhã for one season. On 6 January 2016, he terminated his contract with Covilhã and returned to Benfica. In February, Benfica terminated his contract.

On 11 January 2023, Silva joined Indonesian club Persik Kediri. On 23 February 2023, he scored his first goal for the club against RANS Nusantara. On 28 March 2024, Silva scored 5 goals against Persikabo 1973 in a 5–2 win.

In the 2025 winter transfer window he was signed by South Africa club Kaizer Chiefs. On his debut he scored a goal after being substituted in. He scored in two consecutive South African Premiership games.

== International career ==
In 2015, Silva earned three caps for the Portugal under-19 team, scoring twice. In 2025, Silva was called up by the Guinea-Bissau national football team.
