= Noor Hadi =

Indonesian footballer

Personal information
- Full name: Noor Hadi
- Date of birth: 24 November 1986 (age 39)
- Place of birth: Jepara, Indonesia
- Height: 1.68 m (5 ft 6 in)
- Position: Striker

Youth career
- 2000 – 2004: PS Putra Mayong
- 2004 – 2006: Persijap Jepara

Senior career*
Years	Team	Apps	(Gls)
2006–2014	Persijap Jepara	65	(24)
2014–2015	Barito Putera	13	(6)
2015	PSIS Semarang	0	(0)
- * Club domestic league appearances and goals

Noor Hadi (born 24 November 1986) is an Indonesian former footballer who plays as a striker.
