= Andi Oddang (footballer) =

Indonesian footballer

Andi Odang
Personal information
- Full name: Andi Odang Mustamu
- Date of birth: 16 September 1977 (age 49)
- Place of birth: Jeneponto, Indonesia
- Height: 1.79 m (5 ft 10 1/2 in)
- Position: Forward

Senior career*
Years	Team	Apps	(Gls)
1997–2002	Persim Maros		
2002–2004	PSM Makassar	34	(0)
2005–2006	Sriwijaya FC	28	(13)
2007	Persekabpas Pasuruan	33	(4)
2008–2010	Persebaya Surabaya	34	(17)
2010–2014	PSM Makassar	22	(8)
- * Club domestic league appearances and goals

Andi Oddang (born 16 September 1977 in Makassar) is an Indonesian former footballer who played as a forward.
