= Mulawarman Stadium =

Multi-purpose stadium in Bontang, Indonesia

- Stadion Mulawarman
- PKT Bontang Stadium
- Interactive map of Mulawarman Stadium
- Location: Bontang, Indonesia
- Coordinates: 0°8′35.2″N 117°27′40.46″E
- Owner: PT Pupuk Kalimantan Timur
- Operator: PT Pupuk Kalimantan Timur
- Capacity: 12,000
- Surface: Grass pitch Track

Construction
- Opened: 18 July 1992

Tenants
- Bontang Football Club; Persibon Bontang

Mulawarman Stadium is a multi-purpose stadium in Bontang, Indonesia. It is used mostly for football matches and is used as the home stadium for Bontang Football Club and Persibon Bontang. The stadium has a capacity of 12,000 people.
