= Ilija Spasojević =

Indonesian footballer (born 1987)

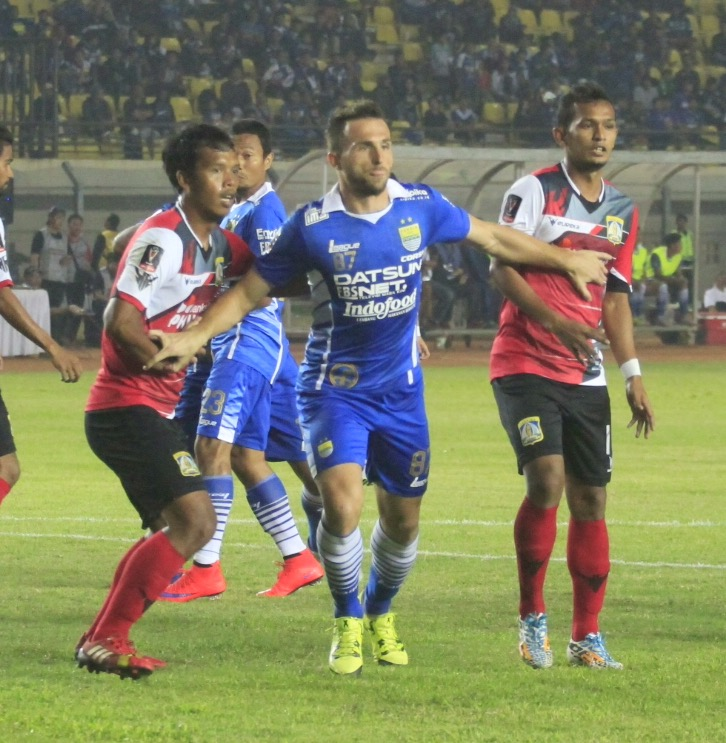
- Spasojević playing for Persib Bandung in 2015

Personal information
- Full name: Ilija Spasojević
- Date of birth: 11 September 1987 (age 39)
- Place of birth: Bar, SR Montenegro, SFR Yugoslavia
- Height: 1.87 m (6 ft 2 in)
- Position: Striker

Team information
- Current team: Semen Padang
- Number: 9

Youth career
- Vojvodina

Senior career*
Years	Team	Apps	(Gls)
2004–2005	Vojvodina	0	(0)
2005–2006	Sutjeska Nikšić	17	(7)
2006	ČSK Čelarevo	12	(1)
2007–2009	Dinamo Tbilisi	57	(23)
2009	Borac Čačak	6	(0)
2010	Liepājas Metalurgs	9	(4)
2010	Trikala	12	(0)
2011	Bali Devata	14	(8)
2011–2013	PSM Makassar	27	(15)
2013	Mitra Kukar	16	(10)
2014	Putra Samarinda	23	(12)
2015	Persib Bandung	2	(0)
2016–2017	Melaka United	33	(27)
2017	Bhayangkara	16	(13)
2018–2024	Bali United	155	(73)
2024–2026	Bhayangkara	45	(11)
2026–	Semen Padang	1	(0)

International career
2005–2007	Serbia & Montenegro U19		
2007–2008	Montenegro U21	2	(0)
2017–2023	Indonesia	10	(5)
- * Club domestic league appearances and goals as of 13 September 2026

Ilija Spasojević (born 11 September 1987) is a professional footballer who plays as a striker for Championship club Semen Padang. Born in Montenegro, he represents the Indonesia national team.

Spasojević is known for his goalscoring ability. A prolific goalscorer, Spasojević has won a Liga 1 Golden Boot and a Malaysia Premier League Golden Boot. Spasojević is also the current all-time top scorer for Bali United.

== Club career ==
=== Early career ===
Born in Bar, Montenegro, Spasojević started his career with Serbian club Vojvodina. In 2005–06, he played for Montenegrin club Sutjeska Nikšić, where he scored 7 goals in 17 matches. In 2006–07, Spasojević played for ČSK Čelarevo in the Serbian First League, where he scored 1 goal in 12 games.

=== Dinamo Tbilisi ===
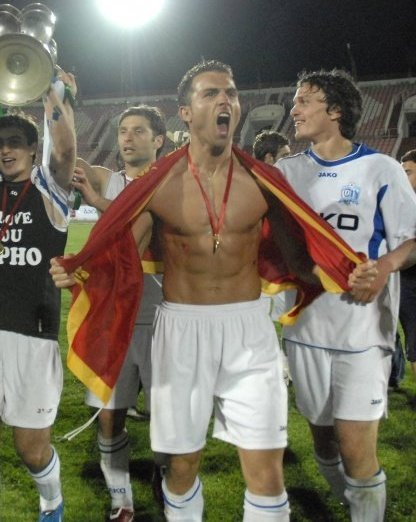
Spasojević celebrating with Dinamo Tbilisi as they won the Georgian League in 2008

In January 2007, Spasojević signed for former UEFA Cup Winners' Cup winner Dinamo Tbilisi from Georgia. While he was playing for Dinamo Tbilisi he scored 30 goals in 61 matches in the Georgian League and the Georgian Cup. He became the first foreign topscorer in the history of Dinamo Tbilisi. During his stay in Dinamo Tbilisi, Spasojević won the Georgian League, Georgian Cup and Georgian Super Cup, and made his debut in the UEFA Champions League on 30 July 2008 against Panathinaikos.

=== Borac Čačak ===
In July 2009, Spasojević was close to sign a contract with Bundesliga club Arminia Bielefeld, but the transfer failed due to financial disagreement. Red Star Belgrade also showed interest in signing him, but on 31 August 2009 he finally joined Borac Čačak in the Serbian SuperLiga.

=== Liepājas Metalurgs ===
On 30 March 2010, Latvian champions Liepājas Metalurgs signed Spasojević. In Latvia he scored 6 goals in 11 matches played in the Latvian League and the Latvian Football Cup.

=== Trikala ===
On 10 September 2010, only two days before the beginning of the Greek Football League, Spasojević joined Trikala. As he arrived late in Trikala, he was used as a substitute in the first games, and he only collected 203 minutes on the field in the first 13 matches. At the same time, Spasojević received an offer from the Indonesian club Bali Devata. Spasojević accepted the offer and moved to Indonesia.

=== Bali Devata ===
On 1 January 2011, Spasojević arrived in Indonesia and signed a contract with Bali Devata, which as a foreign player, where he soon became a key player by scoring 8 goals in the first half-season of the Indonesian league. He also scored two goals in a friendly match played on 23 August 2011 in Surabaya against Indonesia U-23, although Bali Devata was defeated 2:4 in that match.

=== PSM Makassar ===
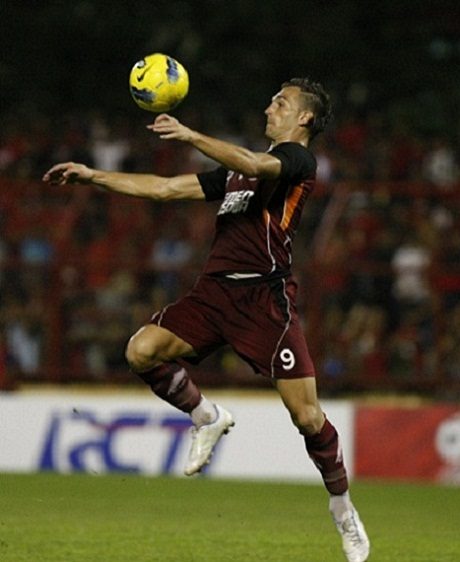
Spasojević in PSM Makassar

On 1 October 2011, Spasojević signed a contract with PSM Makassar in the Indonesian Premier League. On 23 January 2012, it was reported that the Italian Serie B club Brescia Calcio wanted to sign him, but PSM Makassar refused the offer a few days later. His first 2011–12 season with PSM Makassar he finished as club topscorer by scoring 14 goals, 10 goals in the Indonesian Premier League and 4 goals in the Indonesian Cup. He was also selected by Goal.com in the best team of 2011–12 season in Indonesia. As a reward for the great season, Spasojević was invited by the Indonesian Football Association to play alongside Barcelona football star Cesc Fàbregas in an exhibition game between Indonesian national team and "Fabregas and friends". The game took place in Jakarta on 5 July 2012 and ended in a draw (1:1). Spasojević scored the only goal for "Fabregas and friends" after an assist from Cesc Fàbregas. During his time in PSM Makassar, Spasojević scored 19 goals in 29 matches.

=== Mitra Kukar ===
On 15 May 2013, Spasojević joined the Indonesian Super League club Mitra Kukar shortly after that club failed to sign Andriy Shevchenko. As Goal.com reported, Mitra Kukar offered $100,000 per match to the Ukrainian superstar but he refused the offer. The next choice was Spasojević, who signed the contract until the end of the 2013 season. Spasojević scored 10 goals in 16 matches, becoming one of the most prolific strikers in the Indonesian Super League by scoring a goal every 119 minutes on average. With his important goals in the finish of the 2013 season he led Mitra Kukar to achieve the biggest success in the club's history, third place in the Indonesian Super League.

=== Putra Samarinda ===
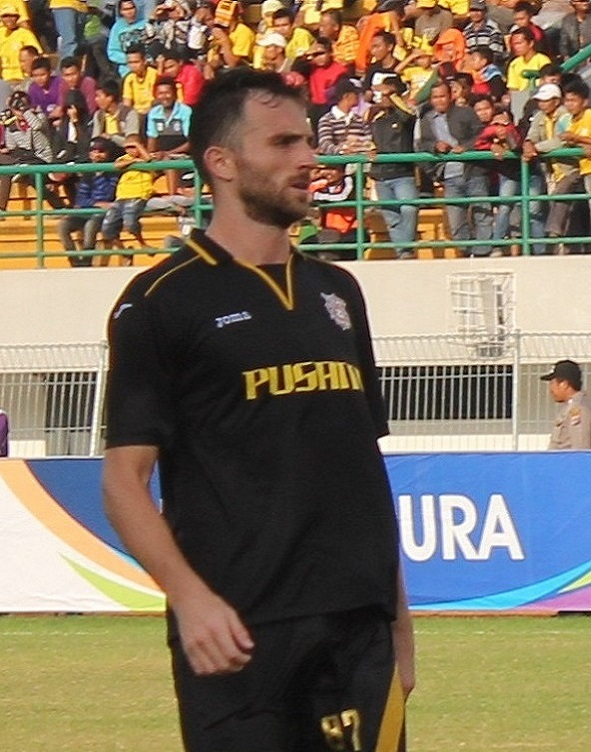
Spasojević playing for Putra Samarinda in 2014

In January 2014, Spasojević signed for Putra Samarinda in the Indonesian Super League. In his 20 matches with Putra Samarinda in the 2014 season he scored 10 goals, becoming the club's top scorer and the third top scorer of the Indonesia Super League. He also scored 2 goals in 3 matches in the 2014 Inter Island Cup.

=== Persib Bandung ===
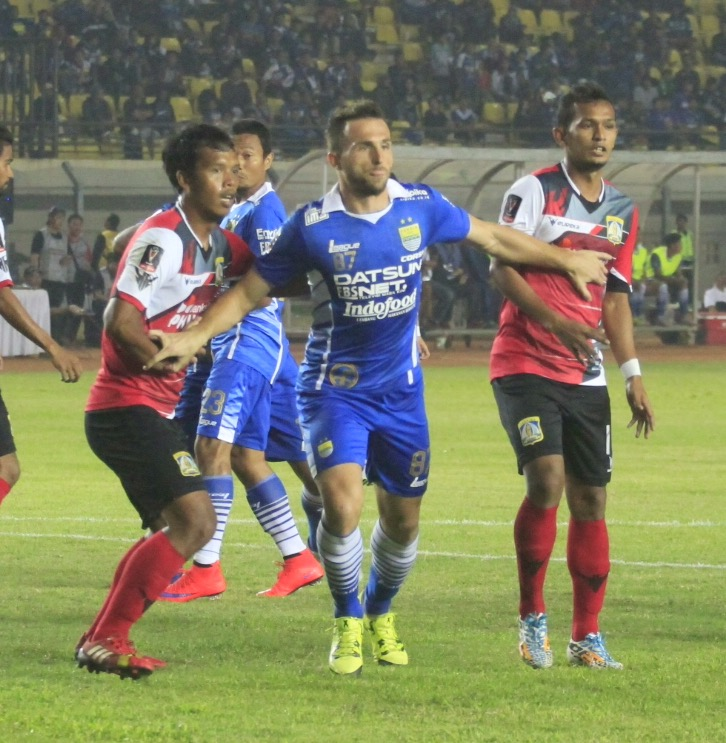
Spasojević playing for Persib Bandung in 2015

After his good performance in the 2014 season, Spasojević was one of the most wanted players during the transfer window for the 2015 season. City rivals from Bandung showed most interest in signing him, as both Persipasi Bandung Raya (PBR) coach Dejan Antonić and Persib Bandung coach Djadjang Nurdjaman admitted to media that Spasojević was their main target for the foreign striker spot. After long negotiations with both teams, Spasojević finally joined PBR on 1 December 2014, becoming the most expensive player in the 2015 Indonesia Super League. Before he played any official match for the new club, Spasojević left PBR due to the club's internal problems and eventually joined Indonesian champions Persib Bandung on 23 March 2015. He was named "man of the match" in his league debut against Semen Padang on 4 April 2015, with his header assisting in a 1:0 victory. Spasojević played only two league matches for Persib Bandung in 2015 as the 2015 Indonesia Super League was officially discontinued by the Football Association of Indonesia on 2 May 2015 due to a ban by the Ministry of Youth and Sports Affairs. In August 2015, the Indonesian government appointed president of Inter Milan and owner of Mahaka Group Erick Thohir to organize the highest level soccer competition in the country, named the President Cup, which started on 30 August in Bali and ended on 18 October 2015 in Jakarta, where the final was held.

During the President Cup, Spasojević showed his top performance and played a key role in Persib Bandung winning another trophy. During the 6 matches he played, he managed to score 4 goals and add 1 assist, collecting 462 minutes on the pitch. He was named "man of the match" twice during the President Cup, on 3 September in a 4:0 win over Persiba Balikpapan when he scored 2 early goals, and on 10 October in a 3:1 win over Mitra Kukar in the semifinal second leg, when he scored a crucial third goal which secured Persib Bandung a place in the final. Spasojević was also named as the best striker in the President Cup by Labbola, leading Indonesian company for Football Statistics Data & Analysis.

=== Melaka United ===
In December 2015 Spasojević signed 2-year contract with Melaka United. He was immediately appointed as team captain due to his experience and leadership abilities. That showed up to be a good decision as he led Melaka United to win Malaysia Premier League 2016 by scoring 24 goals from total 48 goals scored by Melaka United in Malaysia Premier League 2016. That was club's first league trophy after 33 years without silverware.

Spasojević also won Malaysia Golden Boot 2016 and he was named twice as PFA Malaysia Player of the Month. Due to his superb performance in Melaka United jersey, he became the first foreigner in club's history to receive Bintang Cemerlang Melaka award from Melaka Governor Mohd Khalil Yaakob. After scoring 30 goals in 35 matches played in Malaysia, Spasojević and Melaka United took sides in June 2017.

=== Bhayangkara ===
In August 2017, Spasojević signed for Bhayangkara in Indonesian Liga 1. For short time in the club Spasojević already proved his goalscoring ability. He scored 13 goals in 16 league matches, becoming club's top scorer of season 2017. In decisive match for the league title on 8 November, Spasojević scored hattrick as Bhayangkara beat Madura United 3:1 away and became inaugural champion of Indonesian Liga 1.

=== Bali United ===
In December 2017, Spasojević signed a three-year contract with Bali United. Spasojević scored his debut goal for Bali United in 2018 AFC Champions League qualifying play-offs tie against Tampines Rovers as his team won 3–1. Spasojević finished the 2018 season scoring 14 goals in 35 appearances in all competitions. Entering the 2019 season, Spasojević scored a goal in a 2–1 win against Persebaya. He then scored a brace against Borneo FC in a 2–0 win. He scored another brace against Badak Lampung as his team won 3–0. Spasojević ended the season scoring 19 goals in 36 appearances in all competitions, to help his team win the 2019 Liga 1. Spasojević scored his first goal in the 2020 season against Than Quang Ninh FC as his team won 4–1 in the 2020 AFC Cup group stage match tie. The following matchday, he scored again against Svay Rieng as his team lost 2–1.

Spasojević scored two goals in 2021 Menpora Cup as Bali United reached the quarter-final, before losing to PSS Sleman 4–2 on penalties. On 11 September 2021, he scored his first league goal in the 2021 season, scoring against Barito Putra helping his team win 2–1. He scored two goals, including a volley, against Persita Tangerang in his team 2–1 win. At the end of the season, Spasojević become the league top-scorer by scoring 23 goals in 34 matches, helping Bali United clinch their second consecutive Liga 1 title.

On 10 September 2022, Spasojević scored a hat-trick in a 6–0 home win against Dewa United.

On 20 September 2023, Spasojević scored twice in a 2–5 win over Filipino side Stallion Laguna in the AFC Cup group stage.

=== Bhayangkara ===
On 13 July 2024, Spasojević left Bali United after six years with the club to joined Liga 2 club Bhayangkara. He scored on his debut scoring the only goal against Persipa Pati on 8 September.

== International career ==
Spasojević was playing for Serbia-Montenegro U17 and Serbia-Montenegro U19. In 2006, Montenegrins voted on an independence referendum and Serbia and Montenegro became independent countries. Spasojević decided to play for Montenegro U21.

In October 2017, Spasojević officially gained Indonesian citizenship. Spasojević made his official debut on 25 November in a match against Guyana, where he scored twice in a 2–1 win.

In December 2022, Spasojević was included in the final 23-man squad for the 2022 AFF Championship by Shin Tae-Yong. He scored a goal against Brunei in a 7–0 win on the group stage.

== Personal life ==
Ilija Spasojević was born in Bar, present day Montenegro, to Dragutin and Leposava and has two brothers Krsto and Mirko. He have a son and one daughters.

== Career statistics ==
=== International ===
As of match played 9 January 2023

Appearances and goals by national team and year
National team	Year	Apps	Goals
Indonesia	2017	4	3
Indonesia	2019	1	1
Indonesia	2022	2	1
Indonesia	2023	3	0
Total		10	5

As of match played 9 January 2023
Scores and results list Indonesia's goal tally first, score column indicates score after each Spasojević goal.

List of international goals scored by Ilija Spasojević
No.	Date	Venue	Cap	Opponent	Score	Result	Competition
1	25 November 2017	Patriot Chandrabhaga Stadium, Bekasi, Indonesia	1	Guyana	1–1	2–1	Friendly
2	25 November 2017	Patriot Chandrabhaga Stadium, Bekasi, Indonesia	1	Guyana	2–1	2–1	Friendly
3	4 December 2017	Harapan Bangsa Stadium, Banda Aceh, Indonesia	3	Mongolia	3–1	3–2	2017 Aceh World Solidarity Tsunami Cup
4	25 March 2019	Mandalarthiri Stadium, Mandalay, Myanmar	2	Myanmar	2–0	2–0	Friendly
5	26 December 2022	Kuala Lumpur Stadium, Kuala Lumpur, Malaysia	4	Brunei	4–0	7–0	2022 AFF Championship

== Honours ==
Dinamo Tbilisi

- Georgian League: 2007–08
- Georgian Cup: 2009
- Georgian Super Cup: 2008

Persib Bandung

- Indonesia President's Cup: 2015

Melaka United

- Malaysia Premier League: 2016

Bhayangkara

- Liga 1: 2017
- Liga 2 runner-up: 2024–25

Bali United

- Liga 1: 2019, 2021–22
- Indonesia President's Cup runner-up: 2018

Indonesia

- Aceh World Solidarity Cup runner-up: 2017

Individual

- PFAM Player of the Month (Premier League): July 2016, August 2016
- Malaysia Premier League Golden Boot: 2016 (24 goals)
- Malaysia All Competitions Golden Boot: 2016 (27 goals)
- Liga 1 Team of the Season: 2019, 2021–22
- Indonesian Soccer Awards: Favorite Footballer 2019
- Liga 1 Player of the Month: September 2021, September 2022
- Liga 1 Top Goalscorer: 2021–22
- APPI Indonesian Football Award Best 11: 2021–22

== See also ==
- List of Indonesia international footballers born outside Indonesia
