= Indonesian Premier League =

- Organising body: PT Liga Prima Indonesia Sportindo
- Founded: 2011
- First season: 2011–12
- Folded: 2013
- Country: Indonesia
- Confederation: AFC (Asia)
- Number of clubs: 16
- Level on pyramid: 1
- Relegation to: Premier Division
- Domestic cup: Piala Indonesia
- International cup: AFC Cup
- Last champions: Semen Padang (2011–12)
- Most championships: Semen Padang (1 title)
- Broadcaster(s): Kompas TV; MNC Media
- Website: premierleague.co.id

Indonesian Premier League (IPL; Indonesian: Liga Prima Indonesia) was the highest level competition for football clubs in Indonesia from 2011 to 2013. This competition was managed by PT Liga Prima Indonesia Sportindo, under supervision of the Football Association of Indonesia (PSSI). IPL replaced Indonesia Super League (ISL) as the highest-level football league in Indonesia.

== History ==
Following the disbandment of the Liga Primer Indonesia in August 2011, along with the turn of the management of PSSI after a series of chaos over the implementation of the national football competition, a management under the leadership of then-new PSSI chairman Djohar Arifin Husin planned to make various changes intended to create a new competition.

=== Founding ===
On 26 August 2011, a member of Executive Committee and Chairman of the Competition Committee of PSSI, Sihar Sitorus, announced that the organisation has appointed PT Liga Prima Indonesia Sportindo as manager of professional competition for the 2011–12 season, after the previous promoter, PT Liga Indonesia (PT LI), failed to provide an accountability report to the PSSI, while the verification to be performed by the AFC was imminent. Widjajanto, a former CEO of PT Liga Primer Indonesia, was appointed as the CEO of PT LPIS.

=== Shutdown ===
On 17 March 2013, a PSSI Extraordinary Congress announced an unified league, called the Indonesia Super League to be competed by 22 clubs. The Indonesian Premier League disbanded at the end of the 2013 season following its play-offs; IPL's seven best teams were required to pass a verification process to participate in the 2014 season, four of which (Semen Padang, Persiba Bantul, Persijap, and PSM Makassar) were admitted to the successor league.

== Broadcasting ==
- 2011–2012: MNC Media
- 2013: Kompas TV (PSM Makassar & Persebaya 1927 home match) & MNC Media (play-off)

== Teams ==
Club	Regency or city	Seasons	Current status
Arema Indonesia	Malang	2011–2013	Liga 4
Bontang	Bontang	2011–2013	Liga 4
Jakarta 1928	Jakarta	2011–2013	Defunct
Persebaya 1927	Surabaya	2011–2013	Super League
Persema	Malang	2011–2013	Liga 4
Perseman	Manokwari	2013	Liga 4
Persepar	Palangka Raya	2013	Liga 4
Persiba	Bantul	2011–2013	Liga Nusantara
Persibo	Bojonegoro	2011–2013	Liga Nusantara
Persijap	Jepara	2011–2013	Super League
Persiraja	Banda Aceh	2011–2013	Championship
Pro Duta	Deli Serdang	2013	Defunct
PSIR	Rembang	2013	Liga 4
PSLS	Lhokseumawe	2013	Liga 4
PSM	Makassar	2011–2013	Super League
PSMS	Medan	2011–2012	Championship
Semen Padang	Padang	2011–2013	Super League

== Championship history ==
Year	Champions	Runners-up
2011–12	Semen Padang	Persebaya 1927
2013	No award given	

=== Top scorers ===
Year	Scorer	Club	Goals
2011–12	(Indonesia) Ferdinand Sinaga	Semen Padang	15
2013	No award given		

=== Best players ===
Year	Player	Club
2011–12	(Indonesia) Hengky Ardiles	Semen Padang
2013	No award given	
