= Bontang F.C. =

Association football team in Indonesia

Bontang FC
- Full name: Bontang Football Club
- Nicknames: Laskar Khatulistiwa (Equator Warriors); Laskar Bukit Tursina (Tursina Hill Warriors)
- Founded: 18 June 1988; 38 years ago
- Ground: Mulawarman Stadium; Bontang, Indonesia
- Capacity: 12,000
- Owner: PT Pupuk Kaltim
- President: Nurkhalid
- Manager: Alvin Rausan Fikry
- League: Liga 4
Home colours	Away colours	Third colours

Bontang Football Club (formerly known as PKT Bontang or Pupuk Kaltim) is an Indonesian professional football team located in Bontang, East Kalimantan in the island of Borneo. The homebase is Mulawarman Stadium. Bontang FC prides itself as the most successful club to come out of Kalimantan. They were semi-finalist of the 1994–95 Liga Indonesia and finalist in 1999–2000 Liga Indonesia Premier Division. Bontang FC also build a football academy namely Diklat Mandau or PKT Junior.

== History ==
The club was founded as PS Pupuk Kaltim Galatama on 18 June 1988 and founded by PT Pupuk Kaltim. It went through several name changes (Pupuk Kaltim and PKT Bontang) and changes as PS Bontang PKT (abbreviation from Persatuan Sepakbola Bontang Pupuk Kalimantan Timur) in 2002. Bontang PKT was also one team in Liga Indonesia, who were never relegated from Liga Indonesia Premier Division. It also made some appearances in Asian Winners Cup and it was the first ever and last made by a club from Kalimantan. This is quite a striking achievement compared to its city rival, Persibon Bontang, which only plays in the lower tiers (Second Division and Third Division) and even without good results. This club changed name to Bontang Football Club on 12 June 2009. Bontang FC disbanded after having to stumble in the 2018 Liga 3 season.

=== Match-fixing scandal ===
In 2013 the club was involved in the match fixing scandal in the event the Indonesian Premier League play-off during a game against PSLS Lhokseumawe club who were also involved in the scandal. It was revealed after FIFA suspicion over the outcome of the game was not fair, an indication of match fixing is known by FIFA through the Early Warning System (EWS) which owned them. Therefore, after doing a thorough investigation over the last two months, the discipline committee of the Indonesia FA finally sentenced to ban all club players from playing in Indonesia football competition for two years and their coach Fodé Camara from Guinea was punished by not permitting their involvement in Indonesian football lifetime life, as well as an official team also receiving a five-year sentence. While the club was barred from the league for two years and relegated to the lowest caste competition in Indonesia Third Division and a fine of IDR 100 million.

== Crest ==
First crest (1988–2009)

Second crest (2009–present)

== Season-by-season records ==
Season	League/Division	Tms.	Pos.	Piala Indonesia	AFC/AFF competition(s)	
1994–95	Premier Division	34	Semifinals	–	–	–
1995–96	Premier Division	31	Second round	–	–	–
1996–97	Premier Division	33	7th, East division	–	–	–
1997–98	Premier Division	31	did not finish	–	–	–
1998–99	Premier Division	28	Second round	–	–	–
1999–2000	Premier Division	28	2	–	–	–
2001	Premier Division	28	5th, East division	–	Asian Cup Winners' Cup	Second round
2002	Premier Division	24	6th, East division	–	–	–
2003	Premier Division	20	10	–	–	–
2004	Premier Division	18	11	–	–	–
2005	Premier Division	28	6th, East division	Second round	–	–
2006	Premier Division	28	10th, East division	Round of 16	–	–
2007–08	Premier Division	36	13th, East division	Round of 16	–	–
2008–09	Indonesia Super League	18	13	First round	–	–
2009–10	Indonesia Super League	18	11	Second round	–	–
2010–11	Indonesia Super League	15	15	–	–	–
2011–12	Indonesian Premier League	12	11	Second round	–	–
2013	Indonesian Premier League	16	4th, Play-off round	–	–	–
2014	First Division	73	First round	–	–	–
2015						
2016
2017	Liga 3	32	Eliminated in provincial round	–	–	–
2018	Liga 3	32	Eliminated in provincial round	–	–	–

== Performance in AFC competitions ==
Season	Competition	Round	Club	Home	Away	Aggregate
1991–92	Asian Cup Winners' Cup	First round	(Pakistan) Karachi Port Trust	6–0	3–0	9–0
1991–92	Asian Cup Winners' Cup	Quarter final	(Philippines) Sinugba	w/o		
1991–92	Asian Cup Winners' Cup	Semi final	(Japan) Nissan	0–0	0–2	0–2
1992–93	Asian Cup Winners' Cup	First round	(Hong Kong) Sing Tao	w/o		
1992–93	Asian Cup Winners' Cup	Second round	(Japan) Yokohama Marinos	1–1	1–3	2–4
2000–01	Asian Cup Winners' Cup	Second round	(Thailand) BEC Tero Sasana	0–1	1–4	1–5
