= List of assets owned by Starz Entertainment =

This is a list of assets currently or formerly owned by Starz Entertainment.

== Wholly-owned assets ==
- Starz Global Franchise Management
- Starz Inc.
  - Starz (Premium cable channels and streaming service)
  - Starz Encore
  - MoviePlex
    - IndiePlex
    - RetroPlex

== Joint ventures ==
- Laugh Out Loud (JV with Kevin Hart)
  - LOL Network
  - LOL Stand-Up
- Tribeca Shortlist (streaming service; JV with Tribeca Enterprises)
  - Tribeca Channel (FAST streaming network)
- Celestial Tiger Entertainment (JV with Celestial Pictures and Saban Capital Group)
  - Celestial Movies
    - Celestial Movies HD
    - Celestial Classic Movies
    - Celestial Movies Pinoy
    - CM+
  - KIX
  - Thrill
  - Miao Mi

== Former assets ==
Several assets were spun-off in 2024 to form Lionsgate Studios, of which Starz Entertainment remains as its majority shareholder until its separation on May 6, 2025.

=== Lionsgate Motion Picture Group ===
- Lionsgate Films
  - Lionsgate Premiere
  - Lionsgate UK
    - Elevation Sales (joint venture with StudioCanal UK)
    - Primal Media
    - Potboiler Television (joint venture with Potboiler Productions)
  - Lionsgate India
- Summit Entertainment
  - Summit Premiere
  - Summit Entertainment Records
  - International Distribution Company, LLC (joint venture with Pedro Rodriguez)
- eOne Films
  - Amblin Partners (minority stake; joint venture with Steven Spielberg, Reliance Entertainment, Alibaba Pictures, and Universal Pictures)
    - Amblin Entertainment
    - DreamWorks Pictures
  - Makeready (co-backing with Universal Pictures)
  - Sierra/Affinity
- Spyglass Media Group (18.9% with Lantern Entertainment, Warner Bros. Pictures, Cineworld and Eagle Pictures)
- Pantelion Films (50% with TelevisaUnivision)
- Roadside Attractions (43%)
- Grindstone Entertainment Group
- Studio L
- Good Universe
  - Bad Hombre
- Globalgate Entertainment (joint venture with Televisa Cine (Mexico), Tobis Film (Germany), Nordisk Film (Denmark), TME Films (Turkey), TF1 Studio (France), Lotte Entertainment (South Korea), Belga Films (Belgium), PKDN Films (Japan), Paris Filmes (Brazil), Viva Films (Philippines), Falcon Pictures (Indonesia), Cine Colombia (Colombia) and Rai Cinema (Italy))

=== Lionsgate Television, Inc. ===
- Lionsgate Television
  - Debmar-Mercury
  - Sea to Sky Entertainment (joint venture with Thunderbird Entertainment)
  - 3 Arts Entertainment (majority stake)
  - 42 (minority stake)
  - Amblin Television (minority stake)
- Lionsgate Alternative Television
  - BLACKFIN
  - Daisybeck Studios
  - Force Four Entertainment
  - Paperny Entertainment
  - Pilgrim Media Group
    - 1620 Media
  - Renegade 83
  - Whizz Kid Entertainment

=== Others ===
- Lionsgate Channels
  - MovieSphere by Lionsgate
  - OuterSphere by Lionsgate
  - HerSphere by Lionsgate
  - Ebony TV by Lionsgate (joint venture with Ebony Media Group)
- Lionsgate Games
- Lionsgate Music

=== Pre-Lionsgate Studios split ===
- Alliance Films
  - Maple Pictures
  - Momentum Pictures
    - Momentum Asia
  - Aurum Producciones
  - Alliance Atlantis
    - Alliance Communications
      - Cineplex Odeon Films
    - Atlantis Communications
      - Atlantis Films
    - Salter Street Films
- Anchor Bay Entertainment
  - Anchor Bay Films
  - Video Treasures
    - HGV Video Productions
  - Starmaker Entertainment
    - Media Home Entertainment
      - Fox Hills Video
      - The Nostalgia Merchant
      - Hi-Tops Video
  - Burbank Video
  - Prism Entertainment/Prism Pictures
  - Wizard Video
  - MNTEX Entertainment
  - Regal Video
  - Strand Home Video
- Artisan Entertainment
  - LIVE Entertainment/International Video Entertainment
    - U.S.A. Home Video
    - Family Home Entertainment - Renamed Lionsgate Family Entertainment
    - The Video Late Show
    - Magnum Entertainment
    - Vestron Video
      - Vestron Pictures
      - Lightning Video
      - Lightning Pictures
      - Children's Video Library
    - Carolco Home Video
    - Republic Pictures Home Video
      - Worldvision Home Video
    - Hallmark Home Entertainment
      - Cabin Fever Entertainment
      - Evergreen Entertainment
      - Crayola Home Entertainment
    - Avid Home Entertainment
    - VCL (Germany)
    - ThrillerVideo
    - King Bee Video
- Avalanche Home Entertainment
- Celebrity Home Entertainment
- Christal Films
- Codeblack Films
- Comic-Con HQ
- Defy Media (19%)
- Entertainment One - absorbed into Lionsgate and split into three companies
- eOne Television - merged with Pilgrim Media Group to form Lionsgate Alternative Television
- Epix - Metro-Goldwyn-Mayer acquired Lionsgate's stake in the network in 2017
  - Epix2
  - Epix Drive-In
  - Epix Hits
- Fearnet - NBCUniversal acquired Lionsgate's stake in the network in 2013
- Film Roman - acquired by Waterman Entertainment in 2015; pre-2015 library retained by Starz
- Koch Entertainment
- Lionsgate Home Entertainment
- Mandalay Pictures (1997–2002)
- Mandate Pictures
- Manga Entertainment (US branch only, UK branch acquired by Funimation and later renamed Funimation UK and Ireland)
- Miramax - Paramount Home Entertainment acquired distribution rights to the entire Miramax library on September 22, 2020
- Modern Entertainment-acquired from Modern Times Group in 2005.
  - Crown International Pictures library
  - New Visions Pictures library
    - New Century Entertainment library
  - Continental Film Group library
- Contender Entertainment Group
  - Contender Home Entertainment
  - Contender Films
  - Bonkers
  - Kult TV
    - Kult Kidz
  - Nippers
  - Rubber Duck Entertainment (Now part of Hasbro Entertainment)
  - Medusa Communications & Marketing Ltd
    - Hong Kong Legends
    - Premier Asia
- Overture Films
- Pacific International Enterprises
- Pantaya - stake sold in 2021
- Phase 4 Films
- Pop - 50% stake; sold to co-owner CBS Corporation in March 2019, and part of Paramount Global since Dec 4, 2019
- Redbus Film Distribution
  - Redbus Home Entertainment
- Round Room Entertainment (sold to Manhattan West Private Equity Group in October 2022)
- Starz Distribution
- Studio Home Entertainment
  - Sterling Home Entertainment
- Termite Art Productions
- Trimark Pictures
  - Vidmark Entertainment
- Union Pool
- CinéGroupe - sold its stake in 2002
- The Weinstein Company
  - Dimension Films
  - Lantern Entertainment

== See also ==
- Lists of corporate assets
- Lists of Lionsgate films
- List of Lionsgate Television programs
