= William Pfeiffer =

Buisnessman

William Pfeiffer is chief executive officer of Celestial Tiger Entertainment, a partnership among Lions Gate Entertainment, Saban Capital Group, and Celestial Pictures. The company launched two TV channels in August 2009: KIX and Thrill.

As Chief Executive Officer of Hong Kong–based Celestial Pictures from 2001 to 2008, he launched an Asian-content media company with worldwide entertainment assets in the motion picture, television, and new media industries. Celestial Pictures owns and distributes the Shaw Brothers Film Library, the world's largest Chinese film collection. Celestial produces new Asian-language feature films and television programs. Celestial also owns and operates several television channels including Celestial Movies, the most broadly distributed 24-hour Chinese movie channel.

From 1992 to 2001, William Pfeiffer was managing director, Asia, of Sony Pictures' Columbia TriStar International Television and also EVP of Corporate Development for Sony Pictures. He was responsible for launching 20 television channel services across the region under 8 brands, including AXN, Animax, and Sony Entertainment Television, a leading Indian-language group of TV channels. He also initiated and oversaw the production and distribution of over 4000 hours per year of local-language television programming and the launch into feature film production in languages such as Mandarin, Hindi, and Japanese.

Prior to his appointment to Sony, Pfeiffer was President of Japan and managing director, Asia, for The Walt Disney Company's home entertainment business and established its television production business in the region.

Pfeiffer has lived in Asia for twenty-eight years. He studied at the University of Notre Dame and Sophia University (in Tokyo) as an undergraduate and at Stanford University's Graduate School of Business.

== See also ==
- Celestial Pictures
- Lions Gate Entertainment
- KIX
- Thrill
