= Starz Entertainment =

Canadian-American entertainment company

Starz Entertainment Corp.

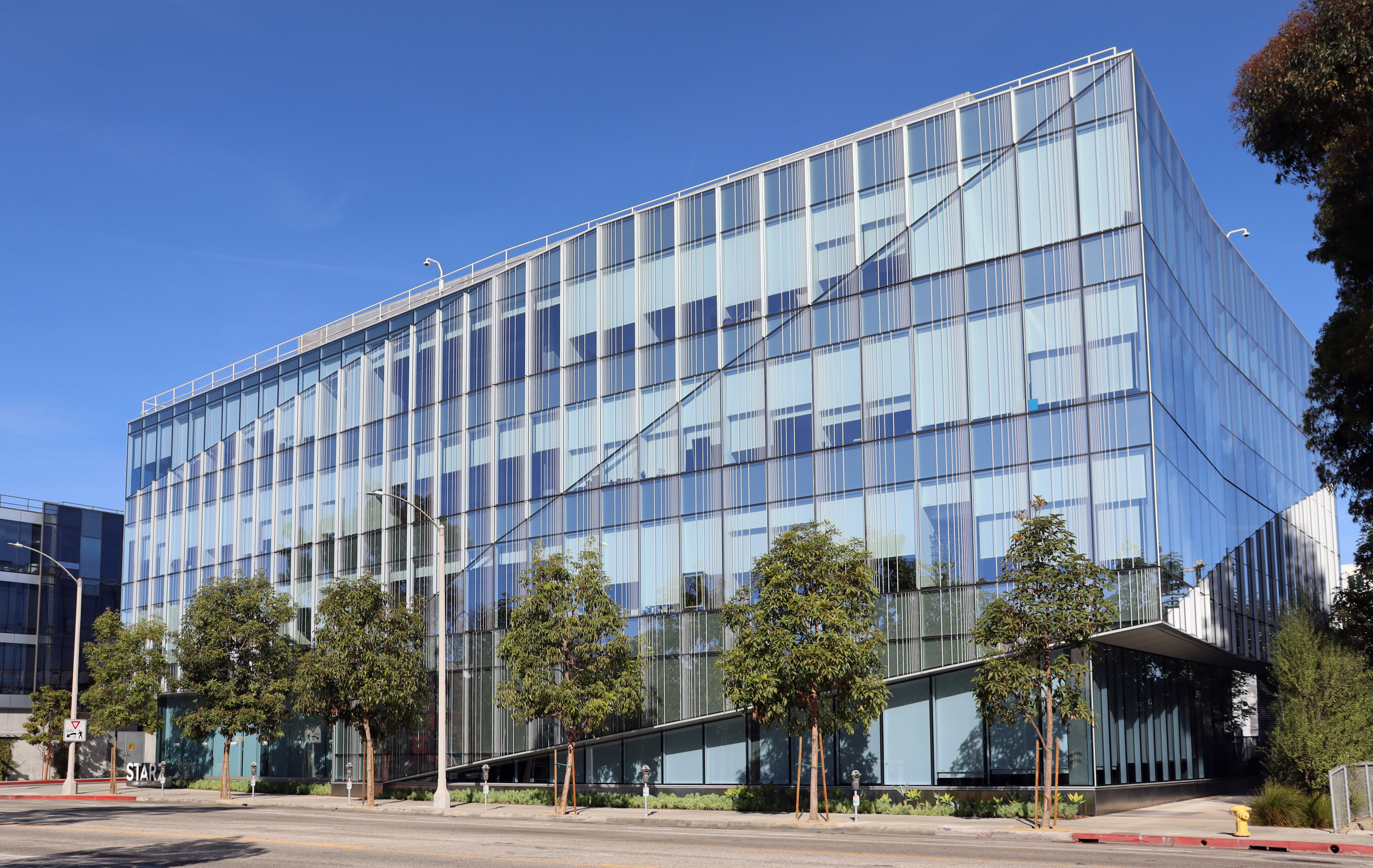
- Headquarters at 1647 Stewart Street in Santa Monica, California
- Trade name: Starz Entertainment
- Formerly: Lions Gate Entertainment Corporation (1997–2024)
- Type: Public
- Traded as: Nasdaq: STRZ
- Industry: Entertainment
- Founded: July 10, 1997; 29 years ago in Vancouver, British Columbia, Canada
- Founder: Frank Giustra
- Successor: Lionsgate Studios (film and TV businesses)
- Headquarters: Santa Monica, California, U.S.
- Area served: United States
- Key people: Michael Burns (chairman); Jeffrey A. Hirsch (president and CEO)
- Services: Video on demand; Broadcast programming; Digital distribution
- Revenue: ▼US$1.37 billion (2025)
- Operating income: ▲ −US$170 million (2025)
- Net income: ▲ −US$211 million (2025)
- Total assets: ▲US$2.17 billion (2025)
- Total equity: ▼US$766 million (2025)
- Number of employees: 541 (2025)
- Divisions: Starz Interactive; Starz Music
- Subsidiaries: Starz Inc.
- Website: starz.com
- Footnotes; Financials as of fiscal year ended March 31, 2025. References

Starz Entertainment Corp., formerly known as Lions Gate Entertainment Corporation, or simply Lionsgate, is a Canadian-American entertainment company currently headquartered in Santa Monica, California. Founded by Frank Giustra on July 10, 1997, it is/was domiciled and incorporated in Vancouver, British Columbia.

The company previously operated film and television studios; these were spun-off into Lionsgate Studios on May 14, 2024, of which Starz owned 87% until its separation on May 7, 2025. The company trades on Nasdaq with the stock symbol STRZ.

== History ==
=== Formation ===
Former logo as Lionsgate (still used by Lionsgate Studios)

Lionsgate was formed in 1997 by Frank Giustra, whose $16 million investment was augmented by $40 million from investors including Keyur Patel and Yorkton Securities executives such as G. Scott Paterson. The company was named for the Lions Gate Bridge in Vancouver, British Columbia, Canada, highlighting the company's founding location. Giustra had recently retired as CEO from Yorkton, an investment bank, of which Paterson was then president. Giustra then merged Lionsgate with Toronto Stock Exchange–listed Beringer Gold Corp. (founded in 1986) to take the company public. Beringer's mining assets were soon sold off.

Lionsgate then began a series of acquisitions to enter the film industry, buying small production facilities and distributors, including, in 1997, Montreal-based Cinépix Film Properties (which became the present-day Lionsgate Films), and Peter Guber's Vancouver, British Columbia studios, North Shore Studios (which became known as Lions Gate Studios, until its sale in 2006) and Mandalay Television, which was acquired with a 4% Lionsgate stake provision for Gruber.

=== Early history ===
In 1998, Lionsgate helped Guber form Mandalay Pictures with a 45% investment in Mandalay. Lionsgate followed that up with a June purchase of International Movie Group, Inc. (IMG), a bankrupt film distributor previously invested in by Guber and Yorktown Securities, for its film library. IMG's CEO Peter Strauss became President of Lions Gate Entertainment, Inc. (LGE), the American parent company for Lionsgate's U.S. interests. The Lions Gate Media subsidiary was also formed to produce for television.

Completing its first year of operation, Lionsgate had a revenue of $42.2 million with a loss of $397,000. The company share price dropped to a low of $1.40. This limited the corporation's ability to make acquisitions via stock swaps. Lionsgate instead made its next acquisition of Termite Art Productions, a reality-based television production company, for $2.75 million by issuing three convertible promissory notes. Giustra had the shareholders vote to move the company's public listing from the Toronto Stock Exchange to the American Stock Exchange, along with a two-for-one stock consolidation to qualify, for greater exposure that might boost share value.

In January 1999, Roman Doroniuk was named president and chief operating officer of Lionsgate, which led to the corporation's financial operations being moved in April to Doroniuk's offices in Toronto, Ontario while corporate headquarters remained in Vancouver, British Columbia. Lionsgate created US based Avalanche Films and acquired half of Sterling Home Entertainment, both in video sales. Again, Lionsgate registered losses in its second year of $9.3 million on revenues of $78.3 million with most of the losses from its stake in Mandalay Pictures. Thus in the summer, Lionsgate placed its studios up for sale with no buyers. Television operations were changed to non-network hourlong series over riskier network shows and ended its relationship with Mandalay Television. The corporation sought out more capital and cash with a filing of a preliminary prospectus for the sale of preferred stock and common stock warrants and a $13.4 million line of credit.

=== 2000s expansion ===
Additional acquisition funding arrived in January 2000 as a $33.1 million investment from an investor group that included Paul Allen, former Sony Pictures executive Jon Feltheimer, German broadcasting company Tele-Munchen, and SBS Broadcasting SA. This led to Feltheimer taking over as CEO from Giustra thus the passed over Doroniuk left the company. Feltheimer increased film making including several $1 million films at Avalanche. However, Federgreen still remains one of the major owners of the company and is extremely involved in the making of all their major movies. In June, Lionsgate acquired Trimark Holdings, Inc. for approximately $50 million in stock and cash including taking on $36 million in debt.

Lionsgate continued making acquisitions during the decade to boost distribution and its film library. On December 15, 2003, Lionsgate acquired Artisan Entertainment for $220 million. Following the acquisition, Lionsgate relocated from Marina del Rey to Artisan's headquarters in Santa Monica. In 2004, Erik Nelson reacquired Termite Art from Lionsgate, renaming it Creative Differences.

Lionsgate partnered with Panamax Films in 2005 to make movies for the Latino market which only produced two films. On April 13, 2005, Lionsgate spun off its Canadian distribution unit into a new distribution unit called Maple Pictures under the direction of two former Lionsgate executives, Brad Pelman and Laurie May. On August 1, 2005, Lions Gate Entertainment acquired the entire library of Modern Entertainment, the U.S. film division of the Swedish television company Modern Times Group. On October 17, 2005, Lionsgate acquired UK company Redbus Film Distribution for $35 million and became Lionsgate UK on February 23, 2006.

On March 15, 2006, Lionsgate sold Lions Gate Studios to Bosa Development Corporation. On July 12, Lionsgate purchased Debmar-Mercury, an independent television distributor, which has continued operations as a Lionsgate subsidiary. The company agreed in August to lease terms with New Mexico State Land Office and the city of Rio Rancho for a new 52.8 acres studio near Rio Rancho's under construction city center and arena.

On July 26, 2007, Lionsgate bought a partial stake in independent film distribution company Roadside Attractions. Lionsgate started up Lionsgate Music by June 2007. On September 10, 2007, Lionsgate bought Mandate Pictures for $56.3 million, $44.3 million in cash and $12 million in stock, and taking on $6.6 million of Mandate's debt. Mandate Chief Executive Joe Drake returned to the company as co-chief operating officer of its film unit.

By July 2008, Lionsgate has not made any progress on building its new film studio in Rio Rancho or on setting up the corporation to run the studio per its agreement with New Mexico. In November, Lionsgate Music established a joint venture with music publishing company Wind-up Records.

In January 2009, Lionsgate purchased TV Guide Network and TVGuide.com from Rovi for $255 million cash. In May 2009, Lionsgate sold a 49% stake in TV Guide Network and website to One Equity Partners under pressure from shareholder Carl Icahn.

Lionsgate cut back its slate of films per year by four in February 2009. In April, Relativity Media signed with Lionsgate for a 5 picture per year multi-year film distribution. In August, Lionsgate signed with Redbox for a five-year same day release deal worth $158 million. Lionsgate, along with MGM and Paramount Pictures/Viacom, was also a co-owner of Epix, a pay TV movie channel which debuted on October 30.

=== 2010s ===
On September 13, 2010, Lionsgate and Televisa formed a joint venture, Pantelion Films, to produce for the next five years eight to 10 films a year targeted for the U.S. Latin American market.

Lionsgate sold off its Canadian distribution unit, Maple Pictures, in September 2011 to Alliance Films.

Lionsgate announced on January 13, 2012, that it had acquired Summit Entertainment, producers and distributors of the Twilight Saga films, for $412.5 million. The two companies have planned on merging since 2008. On October 6, 2012, Lions Gate Entertainment announced that Brian Goldsmith became the co-COO of the company and joining co-COO Steve Beeks. On November 18, 2012, Lionsgate announced it has passed over the $1 billion mark for the first time with the success of The Hunger Games and The Twilight Saga: Breaking Dawn – Part 2.

On December 23, 2013, Lionsgate announced they have crossed over $1 billion domestically and internationally for the second year in a row with the success of The Hunger Games: Catching Fire, Now You See Me, Instructions Not Included, and Kevin Hart: Let Me Explain.

On April 14, 2014, Comcast acquired the remaining stakes in Fearnet from Lionsgate and Sony Pictures Entertainment. On April 21, 2014, Lionsgate announced that they will merge its movie marketing operations. A few days later, on April 30, Lionsgate announced that the studios will expand into the gaming development.

In 2015, Lionsgate took over the distribution functions for CBS Films, the film division of CBS Corporation.

On February 11, 2015, John C. Malone swapped a 4.5% stake with 14.5% of the voting power in Starz Inc. for 3.4% of Lionsgate's shares while joining the company's board of directors. Fourteen days later, Starz CEO Chris Albrecht hinted a possible merger with Lionsgate.

On April 1, 2015, Lionsgate announced it has created its new label, Lionsgate Premiere. This new label will handle up to 15 releases a year, targeting young audiences at theaters and digital outlets. The new label, part of the company's diversification effort, will incorporate Lionsgate and Summit Entertainment titles (including the Step Up film series and the Red film series) and then specialize in "innovative multiplatform and other release strategies" to reach "affinity audiences with branded content and targeted marketing." Marketing and Research SVP Jean McDowell will handle marketing, with distribution to be run by Adam Sorensen, who currently manages Western Sales.

On November 10, 2015, Malone's two other companies, Liberty Global and Discovery, Inc. made a joint investment of $195–400 million in Lionsgate and acquired a 3.4% stake in the company. Then on June 30, 2016, Lionsgate agreed to acquire Starz Inc. for $4.4 billion in cash and stock. As of December 2016, it became the parent company of Starz Inc.

On November 12, 2015, Lionsgate created a partnership with television producer Craig Piligian when the studio acquired more than 50% of his Pilgrim Studios company worth $200 million. Piligian retained his position as CEO of the company while Pilgrim will continue to operate independently under Piligian. The deal made Lionsgate a major unscripted player.

On July 13, 2016, Lionsgate acquired a minority stake in British unscripted television production startup company Primal Media. It was launched by Matt Steiner and Adam Wood, who originally launched Gogglebox Entertainment that was acquired by Sony Pictures Television.

On December 15, 2017, the weekly US financial newspaper Barron's revealed that Malone was selling nearly 108,000 class B shares in Lionsgate for $3.2 million, or $29.63 each, from December 4 to 13. Malone now owns directly and indirectly 6 million nonvoting class B shares, as well as beneficially about 6 million class A shares, which carry one vote each.

Following sexual abuse allegations against producer Harvey Weinstein, Lionsgate was listed as one of 22 potential buyers interested in acquiring The Weinstein Company.

In 2018, Lionsgate's newly launched digital content unit, Studio L, announced its first slate. In October 2018, Agapy Kapouranis replaced Peter Iacono as president of international television and digital distribution.

==== 2018−2023: Acquisition targets ====
In January 2018, Lionsgate became for a acquisition, with Sony Pictures Entertainment.

On February 27, 2018, a month after the bidding war announcement, Variety reported in a detailed article that toy manufacturing company Hasbro (which had collaborated with the company in the 2017 film My Little Pony: The Movie via its Allspark Pictures theatrical film financing unit which is in turn owned by its Allspark division) came close to also acquiring Lionsgate, but the deal fell through. Hasbro would later go on to acquire Entertainment One (eOne; another Canadian-founded business) on December 30, 2019.

On October 3, 2019, Malone completed the sale of his stake in the studio.

In April 2021, Lionsgate's Starz division filed an injunction in Brazil, Argentina and Mexico against The Walt Disney Company over the use of the Star+ brand in Latin America. The two companies would reach a settlement in August that same year.

In July 2021, Lionsgate purchased an 18.9% equity stake in Spyglass Media Group and acquired the catalogue of The Weinstein Company from Spyglass.

=== 2023–present: Entertainment One acquisition, split from studios and rebranding ===
From January 2023, Lionsgate entered a movie distribution deal with Cineplex Pictures, a subsidiary of Toronto-based Cineplex Entertainment which will see the release of selected Lionsgate titles in Canada.

On July 17, 2023, Deadline Hollywood reported that Lionsgate was a frontrunner to acquire Entertainment One from Hasbro. On August 3, 2023, Lionsgate announced it would acquire the motion picture and television assets of Entertainment One from Hasbro for $500 million. Included among the assets are the trademarks of Maple Pictures, which Lionsgate divested to Alliance Films in 2011. The studio is expected to also pay $375 million in cash and $125 million in production financing loans related to the purchase. The acquisition was completed on December 27, 2023, and eOne would later rebrand as "Lionsgate Canada" the following year; re-establishing Lionsgate's Canadian roots.

Following the completion of acquisition of Entertainment One on December 27, 2023, Lionsgate revealed its plan to split its film and television assets from Starz following the completion of the company's acquisition of eOne. The company's Studios division will merge with Screaming Eagle Corp., a special-purpose acquisition company led by Eli Baker, to form a separate publicly traded company, Lionsgate Studios. The transaction sets a $4.6-billion value on Lionsgate Studios and the deal was closed on May 7, 2024. The company was launched on May 14, 2024 and it has been trading on Nasdaq via the stock symbol LION. Lionsgate remained the controlling shareholder owning around 87% of Lionsgate Studios following the split.

On November 28, 2024, Lionsgate rebranded to Starz Entertainment to distinguish itself from Lionsgate Studios.

On May 7, 2025, the separation of Lionsgate Studios and Starz Entertainment was finalized after having been approved by shareholders. Starz Entertainment delisted its two classes of stock under the ticker symbols LGF.A and LGF.B from the New York Stock Exchange and began trading as STRZ on the Nasdaq.

Bloomberg reported on November 16, 2025 that Starz Entertainment was interested in making a bid to buy A+E Global Media, a joint venture of The Walt Disney Company and Hearst Corporation. On December 17, 2025, it was reported that Starz was interested in acquiring the Global Linear Networks businesses of Warner Bros. Discovery (WBD). However, Paramount Skydance reached a definitive agreement to buy the entirety of WBD on February 27, 2026, rendering Starz' proposal moot.

On March 6, 2026, it was revealed that Byron Allen, owner of Allen Media Group, had acquired a 11% stake in Starz, paying $25 million for 1.8 million shares previously held by Steven Mnuchin. Allen subsequently stated he intended to launch a takeover bid for the entire company at a future date. However, Allen sold his entire stake in the company by October of the same year.

== Divisions and units ==
=== Starz Interactive Ventures and Games ===
Starz Interactive Ventures and Games is the video game development division of Starz Entertainment. It was founded in April 2014 and is headed by Nerdist Industries co-founder Peter Levin. This division is dedicated to producing and distributing multiplatform games based on Lionsgate franchises, and investing in digital businesses. One of these franchises was Blair Witch, with Lionsgate Games publishing a Blair Witch game in 2019.

=== Lionsgate Entertainment World ===
Lionsgate Entertainment World is an indoor interactive experience centre based on Lionsgate's blockbuster film franchises, such as The Hunger Games, The Divergent Series and Now You See Me, opened on Hengqin, Zhuhai, China in the first half of 2019. The Lionsgate project is an investment by Hong Kong conglomerate Lai Sun Group and designed and produced by Thinkwell Group.

=== Celestial Tiger Entertainment ===
In 2008, Lionsgate formed Celestial Tiger Entertainment (CTE) with Saban Capital Group and Celestial Pictures. CTE oversees the distribution rights of Lionsgate properties in Greater China and Southeast Asia.

=== Distribution ===
The distribution of selected recent non-in-house films for pay-per-view and on-demand are under the supervision of NBCUniversal Syndication Studios via Universal Pictures (Universal formerly held home video and television rights to many of the early Lionsgate films), while all others (particularly the in-house films) are distributed for both cable and broadcast television through Lionsgate's syndicated division.

Amazon MGM Studios, under MGM Television, are also distributed in international cable, digital and broadcast television through Lionsgate's syndicated division.

=== Television and streaming ===
Starz's main outlet is the namesake Starz premium cable and satellite television network and streaming service that also includes sister channels Starz Encore and MoviePlex.

In addition to the "Sphere" family of channels ("MovieSphere by Lionsgate", "OuterSphere by Lionsgate", "HerSphere by Lionsgate"), Starz also operates other streaming services and FAST channels through various partnerships. In a joint venture with Ebony Media Group, the company programs the "Ebony TV by Lionsgate" channel.

In 2015, then Lionsgate formed a joint venture with Tribeca Enterprises to launch the "Tribeca Shortlist" streaming service and "Tribeca Channel" FAST channel.

In 2017, then Lionsgate partnered with comedian Kevin Hart to launch the LOL Network.

In 2023, then Lionsgate, Warner Bros. Discovery, and Gray Television formed Free TV Networks.

== Assets ==
=== Wholly-owned assets ===
- Starz Global Franchise Management
- Starz Inc.
  - Starz (Premium cable channels and streaming service)
  - Starz Encore
  - MoviePlex
    - IndiePlex
    - RetroPlex

=== Joint ventures ===
- Laugh Out Loud (JV with Kevin Hart)
  - LOL Network
  - LOL Stand-Up
- Tribeca Shortlist (streaming service; JV with Tribeca Enterprises)
  - Tribeca Channel (FAST streaming network)
- Celestial Tiger Entertainment (JV with Celestial Pictures and Saban Capital Group)
  - Celestial Movies
    - Celestial Movies HD
    - Celestial Classic Movies
    - Celestial Movies Pinoy
    - CM+
  - KIX
  - Thrill
  - Miao Mi

== Corporate governance ==
=== Board of Directors ===
==== Chairman of the Board of Directors ====
- Michael Burns, chairman of Starz

==== Directors ====
- Mignon Clyburn, president of MLC Strategies
- Emily Fine, executive at MHR Fund Management
- Lisa Gersh, executive partner at Attention Capital
- Jeffrey A. Hirsch, president and CEO of Starz
- Bruce Mann, CCO of Liberty Global
- Mark Rachesky, founder and president of MHR Fund Management
- Josh Sapan, president of Sapan Studio
- Hardwick Simmons, former chairman and CEO of Nasdaq
