= OrangeTV =

Indonesian satellite TV service

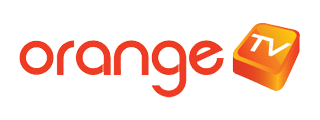
- Type: Satellite television
- Country: Indonesia
- Motto: Jagoannya Hiburan Bermutu (Quality Entertainment Champion)
- Owner: MEI (Mega Entertainment Indonesia) (PT Mega Media Indonesia)
- Launch date: 2012
- Dissolved: 1 July 2018
- Official website: www.orangetv.co.id

OrangeTV was an Indonesian satellite television provider operated by PT Mega Media Indonesia, subsidiary of the MEI. Orange TV operated nationwide in Indonesia from 2012 to 2018.

Starting 2013 season, OrangeTV had the opportunity to be the official broadcast Premier League through a partnership with MP & Silva.

== List of channels ==
=== Premium channels ===
Until May 11, 2018

- Festival Channel
- Dangdut Channel
- Top Hits
- Celestial Movies
- Diva Universal
- KIX
- Thrill
- KBS World
- HBO
- HBO Family
- HBO Signature
- HBO Hits
- Fight Sports
- beIN Sports 1
- beIN Sports 2
- beIN Sports 3 Premier League

=== Free channels ===
- SCTV
- ANTV
- tvOne
- MetroTV
- TVRI
- Indosiar
- Trans TV
- Trans7
- Kompas TV
- NET.
- MNC TV
- CNN Indonesia
- GTV
- RTV
- MYTV
- iNews
- Gramedia TV
- RCTI
