= Sony Max (African TV channel) =

- Broadcast area: Sub-Saharan Africa
- Headquarters: Johannesburg, South Africa

Programming
- Language: English
- Picture format: 16:9 SDTV

Ownership
- Owner: Sony Pictures Television

History
- Launched: 1 February 2011; 15 years ago
- Replaced: Animax
- Closed: 31 October 2018; 7 years ago

Sony Max is a Sub Saharan African television channel owned by Sony Pictures Television International. It operated from 2011 to 2018, indirectly replacing Animax, which had closed in October 2010. The channel aired action movies, reality shows and wrestling.

== History ==
With the closure of Animax scheduled for 31 October 2010, SPT decided to use the channel slot and live-action programming inventory to create a new channel. Sony Max started broadcasting at 21:00 CAT on 1 February 2011 with the movie Lara Croft: Tomb Raider. The channel was added to DStv Mobile in April. In late July, a package of titles from the Celestial Pictures catalogue aired on the channel.

On 7 December 2015, the channel started airing Baywatch from season 1.

In September 2018, DStv announced that it would not renew its contract with Sony, thereby causing the channel's closure from 31 October.
