= CHK =

CHK may refer to:

- CHK (TV channel), a television channel in Southeast Asia
- Chesapeake Energy, a major producer of natural gas
- Civil Hospital Karachi, Pakistan
- Chiswick railway station, England
- Christian Historical Voters' League (Dutch: Christelijk Historische Kiezersbond)
- Chuukese language
- .CHK, a filename extension used by the CHKDSK program
- Checksum
- Cheka (ЧК), Extraordinary Commission, Soviet secret police from 1917 till 1922
