= Super League (Indonesia) =

Top Indonesian association football league

- Organising body: I-League
- Founded: 2008; 18 years ago (as Indonesia Super League); 2017; 9 years ago (as Liga 1); 2025; 1 year ago (as Super League)
- Country: Indonesia
- Confederation: AFC
- Number of clubs: 18
- Level on pyramid: 1
- Relegation to: Championship
- Domestic cup: Piala Indonesia
- League cup: I-League Cup
- International cups: AFC Champions League Two; AFC Challenge League; ASEAN Club Championship
- Current champions: Persib; 4th Super League title 5th Indonesian title (2025–26)
- Most championships: Persib; 4 Super League titles; 5 Indonesian titles
- Top scorer: Cristian Gonzáles (249)
- Broadcasters: Terrestrial: Indosiar; Sin Po TV; Pay TV: Nex Parabola; Streaming: Vidio
- Sponsor: Bank Rakyat Indonesia
- Website: Official website
- Current: 2026–27 Super League

The Super League (Indonesian: Liga Super), officially known as BRI Super League for sponsorship reasons, is the men's top professional football division of the Indonesian football league system. Administered by the I-League, the Super League is contested by 18 clubs and operates on a system of promotion and relegation with the Championship.

Top-flight professional league in Indonesia started from the 2008–09 season onwards, with the original title Indonesia Super League until 2015. Before PSSI formed and organized the Indonesian Super League as the first professional football league in Indonesia, the previous top-level competition title in Indonesia was the Liga Indonesia Premier Division from 1994–95 to 2007–08. Prior to the 2008 reforms, the national competitions used a tournament format. The league has gone through multiple rebranding: Liga 1, which started in 2017, and the Super League, which started in 2025.

Forty-five clubs have competed in the top-tier league of Indonesian football since the inception of the Indonesia Super League in 2008. Eight have won the title: Persib (2014, 2023–24, 2024–25, 2025–26), Persipura (2008–09, 2010–11, 2013), Bali United (2019, 2021–22), Arema (2009–10), Sriwijaya (2011–12), Bhayangkara Presisi (2017), Persija (2018), and PSM (2022–23). Only four clubs have played in every season to date: Arema, Madura United, Persib, and Persija. Semen Padang also won the 2011–12 Indonesian Premier League during the dualism era in Indonesian football.

== History ==
=== Origins ===
In 1994, PSSI merged teams from Perserikatan, a league made up of amateur clubs representing regional football associations, and Galatama, a league made up of semi-professional teams, to form Liga Indonesia. This effort integrated the fanaticism in Perserikatan and the professionalism of Galatama with the aim of improving the quality of Indonesian football. This step ushered in a tiered system in the Indonesian competitive football scene. The group stage like Perserikatan was combined with a full competition system followed by the semi-final and final rounds like Galatama.

=== Foundation ===
The modern competition era started in 2008 with the Indonesia Super League (ISL). The first season began with 18 clubs. The first Indonesia Super League goal was scored by Ernest Jeremiah of Persipura in a 2–2 draw against Sriwijaya F.C. The 18 inaugural members of the new Indonesia Super League were Persipura, Persiwa, Persib, Persik, Sriwijaya, Persela, Persija, PSM, Pelita Jaya, Arema, Persijap, Persiba, PKT Bontang, Persitara, PSMS, Deltras, Persita, and PSIS. Originally, Persiter and Persmin qualified to register but they failed the verification requirements to be inaugural members of the Indonesia Super League.

=== Dualism ===
As the football scene in Indonesia was heavily politicized with rival factions upending each other, conflict was the norm prior to 2017. The worst conflict occurred in 2011. After the inauguration of the new PSSI board in 2011, a member of PSSI's Executive Committee and chairman of its Competition Committee, Sihar Sitorus, appointed PT Liga Prima Indonesia Sportindo (LPIS) as the new league operator replacing PT Liga Indonesia (LI) because LI failed to provide an accountability report to PSSI. Sitorus, one of many politicians in PSSI, announced the Indonesia Premier League as the new top-level competition in Indonesia. Upon the emergence of Liga Primer Indonesia (LPI), PSSI did not recognize the validity of ISL. ISL teams like PSM, Persema, and Persibo, which had boycotted the ISL operators due to referee and management decisions, gladly defected to join LPI along with splinters of existing ISL teams. However, the 2011 LPI season was stopped mid-season, due to continued schism within PSSI; a new league, Indonesian Premier League (IPL; Liga Prima Indonesia) replaced it in late 2011 for the 2011–12 season.

Before the schism of PSSI, Sitorus triggered more controversy when he said the new competition would be divided into two regions and there would be an addition of six clubs in the top division, which angered many association members. 14 teams that were supposed to be Indonesia Premier League contestants chose to support the Indonesia Super League that continued to roll under the support of the pro-IPL faction, despite being labeled as an illegal competition. The official PSSI, supported by FIFA and AFC, did not recognize the ISL for two seasons. In the meantime, the Indonesian Premier League became the top-tier league from 2011 to 2013 with only 11 teams.

In a PSSI extraordinary congress on 17 March 2013, association members slammed Sitorus and decided that the Indonesia Super League would once again emerge as the top-level competition, following the disbandment of the Indonesian Premier League. Sitorus and five other PSSI board members were suspended from the sport for their roles in the split (locally referred to as dualisme, lit. 'dualism') that disrupted Indonesian football.

The new PSSI board also decided that the best seven teams of the 2013 Indonesian Premier League, following verification, would join the unified league. Semen Padang, Persiba Bantul, Persijap, and PSM passed verification, while Perseman, Persepar, and Pro Duta did not, meaning the 2014 season was contested with 22 teams.

=== Government intervention and FIFA suspension ===
The impact of split haunted Indonesian football years after the reconsolidation. On 18 April 2015, Minister of Youth and Sports Affairs Imam Nahrawi officially banned the activities of PSSI after PSSI refused to recognize the recommendations from the Indonesian Professional Sports Agency (Badan Olahraga Profesional Indonesia; BOPI), an agency under the ministry, that Arema Cronus and Persebaya ISL should not pass ISL verification because there were still other clubs using the same name. Previously, Nachrawi had sent three letters of reprimand. However, PSSI refused to answer his call until a predetermined deadline. As a result, PSSI officially stopped all competitions in 2015 season after PSSI's Executive Committee meeting on 2 May 2015 called the government intervention as a force majeure.

The government intervention also led FIFA to punish Indonesia with a one-year suspension of all association football activities as the world body considered overbearing state involvement in footballing matters as a violation against its member PSSI. During the suspension, some tournaments were made to fill the vacuum, starting with the 2015 President's Cup, in which Persib came out as champions, until the Bhayangkara Cup closed the series of unrecognized tournaments.

On 13 May 2016, FIFA officially ended the suspension, following the revocation of the decree by the Indonesian minister on 10 May 2016. A long-term tournament with full competition format, Indonesia Soccer Championship (ISC), emerged shortly thereafter. The 2016 season saw Persipura take the title.

=== First name change ===
In 2017, the top-flight football competition was rebranded under a new official name, Liga 1. The name changes also applied to Premier Division (became Liga 2) and Liga Nusantara (became Liga 3). The operator of the competition was also changed from PT Liga Indonesia (LI) to PT Liga Indonesia Baru (LIB). Bhayangkara was the first champion of the competition under the second name in the 2017 season. True to the controversial nature of Indonesian football, the crowning triggered flak from fans. Bhayangkara, a team managed by the Indonesian Police that had no fanbase, won due to head-to-head advantage against Bali United, a team with rapidly growing support due to its modern professional management, after both teams had the same points at the end of the season. Bali United finally won the title in 2019, following Persija in 2018.

The 2020 season was canceled as the COVID-19 pandemic continued to hit Indonesia. The 2021–22 season used the bubble-to-bubble system so that it would not become a new cluster for the spread of COVID-19. The 2022–23 season was marred by the Kanjuruhan Stadium disaster, and it finished with no relegation. The 2023–24 season introduced the championship play-offs after the regular season. The 2024–25 season saw at least one team represent each island for the first time.

=== Second name change ===
In 2025, the top-flight football competition was rebranded under a new name for a second time, Super League. The name change also applied to Liga 2 (became the Championship). The operator of the competition was also changed from PT Liga Indonesia Baru to I-League.

On 15 January 2026, due to the change of the logo of BRI as the main sponsorship of the competition to commemorate its 130th anniversary on 16 December 2025, the Super League logo underwent a slight adjustment, where the 2020 BRI logo was replaced with the new BRI logo, and the official colors of the competition adopted the colors "Nusantara Blue" and "Cakrawala Blue" which aimed to align them with BRI's new corporate identity. The rebranding took effect on-air beginning at week 18 of the competition on 23 January 2026. The first champion of the competition under the third name was Persib in the 2025–26 season, who won the title on head-to-head against Borneo Samarinda, although both teams ended with the same points.

== Competition format ==
=== Competition ===
There are 18 clubs in Super League. During the course of a season (from September to May) the teams play each other twice (a double round-robin system), once at their home stadium and once at that of their opponents, for 34 games. Teams receive three points for a win, one point for a draw, and no points for a loss. Teams are ranked by total points, then head-to-head records, then goal difference, and then goals scored. If still equal, the fair play points and then drawing of lots decide rank.

=== Promotion and relegation ===
A system of promotion and relegation exists between Super League and Championship. The three lowest placed teams in Super League are relegated to Championship, and the two group winners from Championship promoted to Super League, with an additional team promoted after a play-off involving the group runners-up. The Indonesian Super League had 22 teams in 2014 due to the merging of the two professional leagues in Indonesia.

=== Video Assistant Referee ===
Video assistant referee (VAR) was introduced to Super League at the championship series in the 2023–24 season. The 2024–25 season saw the full usage of the VAR for the first time.

== Clubs ==
Forty-three clubs have played in the top-flight Indonesian football competitions from the start of the modern era in 2008 as Indonesia Super League, up to and including the 2025–26 season.

=== 2026–27 season ===
The following 18 clubs will compete in the Super League during the 2026–27 season.

2026–27 Club	2025–26 Position	First season in top division	First season in Super League	Seasons in top division	Seasons in Super League	First season of current spell in top division	National titles	Most recent national title	Former names	Other leagues
Arema (Note: Founding member of the Super League) (Note: Never been relegated from the Super League)	9th	1994–95	2008–09	29	17	2005	2	2009–10	—N/a	(Note: ISC A 2016)
Bali United	8th	1994–95	2009–10	23	16	2009–10	2	2021–22	(Note: Putra Samarinda)	
Bhayangkara Presisi	5th	2014	2014	11	11	2025–26	1	2017	(Note: Persebaya ISL)	
Borneo Samarinda	2nd	2015	2015	11	11	2015	0	—N/a	—N/a	
Dewa United Banten	7th	2022–23	2022–23	5	5	2022–23	0	—N/a	(Note: Martapura)	—N/a
Garudayaksa	1st (Championship)	2026–27	2026–27	1	1	2026–27	0	—N/a	(Note: PSKC)	—N/a
Isenmulang Kalteng	3rd (Championship)	2026–27	2026–27	1	1	2026–27	0	—N/a	(Note: Farmel)	—N/a
Java United	6th	2024–25	2024–25	3	3	2024–25	0	—N/a	(Note: Putra Jombang)	—N/a
Madura United	14th	1994–95	2008–09	29	17	2007–08	3	1993–94 (Galatama)	(Note: Pelita Jaya)	
Persebaya	4th	1994–95	2009–10	23	10	2018	6	2004	—N/a	(Note: LPI 2011) (Note: IPL 2011/12–2013)
Persib	1st	1994–95	2008–09	30	17	1994–95	10	2025–26	—N/a	
Persija	3rd	1994–95	2008–09	30	17	1994–95	11	2018	—N/a	
Persijap	13th	2001	2008–09	12	6	2025–26	0	—N/a	—N/a	
Persik	12th	2003	2008–09	15	10	2020	2	2006	—N/a	—N/a
Persita	10th	1994–95	2008–09	22	10	2020	0	—N/a	—N/a	—N/a
PSIM	11th	1994–95	2025–26	8	2	2025–26	2	1943 (Inlandsche Stedenwedstrĳden)	—N/a	—N/a
PSM (Note: Absent but never relegated)	15th	1994–95	2008–09	29	14	2011–12 (IPL)	7	2022–23	—N/a	
PSS	2nd (Championship)	2001	2019	14	7	2026–27	0	—N/a	—N/a	—N/a

Note: Top division means the highest football competition in Indonesia which includes the Liga Indonesia Premier Division from 1994 until 2007 and the Indonesian Premier League during the dualism era.

- Top division began from 1994–95 season when Galatama and Perserikatan merged to form Liga Indonesia.
- Persis, Semen Padang, and PSBS were relegated to the Championship for the 2026–27 season, while Garudayaksa, PSS, and Isenmulang Kalteng as winners, runners-up, and promotion play-off winners respectively, were promoted from the 2025–26 season.

Notes:

Former names:

Breakaway league:

Unofficial league:

=== Maps ===
Locations of teams in the 2026–27 Super League
Locations of teams in the 2026–27 Super League from Java region

=== Other clubs ===
The following clubs competed in the Super League since its inception, the top flight Premier Division before 2008, or the dualism era Premier League, but are not competing in the Super League during the 2026–27 season.

Club	Current league	2025–26 Position	First season in top division	First season in Super League	Seasons in top division	Seasons in Super League	Most recent season in Super League	National titles	Most recent national title	Former names	Other leagues
Badak Lampung	Defunct	—N/a	2014	2014	5	5	2019	0	—N/a	(Note: Perseru)	(Note: ISC A 2016)
Barito Putera	Championship	3rd in Group 2	1994–95	2013	20	11	2024–25	0	—N/a	—N/a	
Bontang (Note: Founding member of the Super League)	Defunct	—N/a	1994–95	2008–09	18	3	2010–11	0	—N/a	(Note: Pupuk Kaltim)	(Note: IPL 2011/12–2013)
Deltras	Championship	5th in Group 2	1994–95	2008–09	16	3	2011–12	0	—N/a	(Note: Gelora Dewata)	—N/a
Gresik United	Liga Nusantara	4th in Group D	1994–95	2011–12	15	5	2017	1	2002	(Note: Persegres/Petrokimia Putra)	
Kalteng Putra	Defunct	—N/a	2013 (IPL)	2019	2	1	2019	0	—N/a	(Note: Persepar)	(Note: IPL 2013)
Mitra Kukar	Defunct	—N/a	1994–95	2011–12	10	6	2018	3	1987–88 (Galatama)	(Note: NIAC Mitra)	
Persela	Championship	6th in Group 2	2004	2008–09	16	12	2021–22	0	—N/a	—N/a	
Persema	Liga 4	4th in R3 Group JJ (East Java)	1994–95	2009–10	14	1	2009–10	0	—N/a	—N/a	(Note: LPI 2011)
Persepam	Liga 4	4th in R3 Group DD (national phase)	2013 (ISL)	2013	2	2	2014	0	—N/a	—N/a	—N/a
Persiba Balikpapan	Championship	Won relegation play-off	1994–95	2008–09	16	8	2017	0	—N/a	—N/a	
Persiba Bantul	Liga Nusantara	4th	2011–12 (IPL)	2014	3	1	2014	0	—N/a	—N/a	
Persidafon	Liga 4	3rd (Papua)	2011–12 (ISL)	2011–12	2	2	2013	0	—N/a	—N/a	—N/a
Persikabo 1973	Liga 4	Withdrew (Liga Nusantara)	2011–12 (ISL)	2011–12	11	11	2023–24	0	—N/a	(Note: Persiram)	
Persipura	Championship	4th	1994–95	2008–09	25	12	2021–22	4	2013	—N/a	
Persiraja	Championship	5th in Group 1	1994–95	2020	12	2	2021–22	1	1980 (Perserikatan)	—N/a	
Persis	Championship	16th (Super League)	2007–08	2022–23	5	4	2025–26	5	1941 (Inlandsche Stedenwedstrĳden)	—N/a	—N/a
Persitara	Liga Nusantara	Won relegation play-off	2006	2008–09	4	2	2009–10	0	—N/a	—N/a	—N/a
Persiwa	Defunct	—N/a	2006	2008–09	7	5	2013	0	—N/a	—N/a	—N/a
PSAP	Liga 4	4th in R1 Group N (national phase)	2011–12 (ISL)	2011–12	1	1	2011–12	0	—N/a	—N/a	—N/a
PSBS	Championship	18th (Super League)	2024–25	2024–25	2	2	2025–26	0	—N/a	—N/a	—N/a
PSIS	Championship	8th in Group 2	1994–95	2008–09	20	8	2024–25	2	1998–99	—N/a	—N/a
PSMS	Championship	7th in Group 1	1994–95	2008–09	15	3	2018	6	1985 (Perserikatan)	—N/a	(Note: IPL 2011/12)
PSPS	Championship	6th in Group 1	1999–2000	2009–10	10	4	2013	0	—N/a	—N/a	—N/a
RANS Nusantara	Championship	1st (Liga Nusantara)	2022–23	2022–23	2	2	2023–24	0	—N/a	(Note: Cilegon United)	—N/a
Semen Padang	Championship	17th (Super League)	1994–95	2010–11	22	7	2025–26	1	2011–12 (IPL)	—N/a	
Sriwijaya	Liga Nusantara	10th in Group 1 (Championship)	1994–95	2008–09	19	9	2018	2	2011–12 (ISL)	(Note: Persijatim)	
ArekMalang Indonesia	— (Note: 2024–25 Liga 4)	—N/a	2011–12 (IPL)	—N/a	2	0	—N/a	0	—N/a	(Note: Arema IPL)	
Arseto	Defunct	—N/a	1994–95	—N/a	4	0	—N/a	1	1990–92 (Galatama)	—N/a	—N/a
ASGS	Defunct	—N/a	1994–95	—N/a	3	0	—N/a	0	—N/a	—N/a	—N/a
Bandung Raya	Defunct	—N/a	1994–95	—N/a	3	0	—N/a	1	1995–96	—N/a	—N/a
BPD Jateng	Defunct	—N/a	1994–95	—N/a	2	0	—N/a	0	—N/a	—N/a	—N/a
Indocement Cirebon	Defunct	—N/a	1994–95	—N/a	4	0	—N/a	0	—N/a	(Note: Mataram Putra)	—N/a
Jakarta 1928	Defunct	—N/a	2011–12 (IPL)	—N/a	2	0	—N/a	0	—N/a	—N/a	
Medan Jaya	— (Note: 2021–22 Liga 3)	—N/a	1994–95	—N/a	6	0	—N/a	0	—N/a	—N/a	—N/a
Perseden	Liga Nusantara	3rd in Group D	2003	—N/a	1	0	—N/a	0	—N/a	—N/a	—N/a
Persedikab	Liga 4	4th in R3 Group II (East Java)	1996–97	—N/a	2	0	—N/a	0	—N/a	—N/a	—N/a
Persegi	Defunct	—N/a	2005	—N/a	3	0	—N/a	0	—N/a	—N/a	—N/a
Persekabpas	Liga Nusantara	Quarter-finals	2005	—N/a	3	0	—N/a	0	—N/a	—N/a	—N/a
Perseman	—	—N/a	2007–08	—N/a	2	0	—N/a	0	—N/a	—N/a	
Persibo	Liga Nusantara	3rd in Group C	2011–12 (IPL)	—N/a	2	0	—N/a	0	—N/a	—N/a	
Persibom	Liga 4	3rd in R1 Group B (North Sulawesi)	2005	—N/a	3	0	—N/a	0	—N/a	—N/a	—N/a
Persikab	Liga 4	4th in R1 Group C (West Java Series 1)	1995–96	—N/a	7	0	—N/a	0	—N/a	—N/a	—N/a
Persikabo	Liga 4	3rd in R1 Group L (West Java Series 2)	1997–98	—N/a	4	0	—N/a	0	—N/a	—N/a	—N/a
Persikota	Liga Nusantara	3rd in Group B	1997–98	—N/a	10	0	—N/a	0	—N/a	—N/a	—N/a
Persiku	Championship	7th in Group 2	1994–95	—N/a	1	0	—N/a	0	—N/a	—N/a	—N/a
Persiter	— (Note: 2022–23 Liga 3)	—N/a	2006	—N/a	2	0	—N/a	0	—N/a	—N/a	—N/a
Persma	Liga 4	3rd in R3 Group BB (national phase)	1995–96	—N/a	7	0	—N/a	0	—N/a	—N/a	—N/a
Persmin	Liga 4	3rd in R2 Group D (North Sulawesi)	2005	—N/a	3	0	—N/a	0	—N/a	—N/a	—N/a
Pro Duta	Defunct	—N/a	2013 (IPL)	—N/a	1	0	—N/a	0	—N/a	—N/a	
PS Bengkulu	—	—N/a	1994–95	—N/a	1	0	—N/a	0	—N/a	—N/a	—N/a
PSB	Liga 4	3rd in R2 Group 2 (West Java Series 1)	1996–97	—N/a	2	0	—N/a	0	—N/a	—N/a	—N/a
PSBL	— (Note: 2023–24 Liga 3)	—N/a	1996–97	—N/a	6	0	—N/a	0	—N/a	—N/a	—N/a
PSDS	Liga 4	Lost relegation play-off (Liga Nusantara)	1994–95	—N/a	12	0	—N/a	0	—N/a	—N/a	—N/a
PSIR	Liga 4	Disqualified in semi-finals (Central Java)	1994–95	—N/a	2	0	—N/a	0	—N/a	—N/a	
PSLS	—	—N/a	2013 (IPL)	—N/a	1	0	—N/a	0	—N/a	—N/a	
PSP	Liga 4	3rd in R2 Group S (national phase)	1996–97	—N/a	5	0	—N/a	0	—N/a	—N/a	—N/a
PSSB	—	—N/a	2007–08	—N/a	1	0	—N/a	0	—N/a	—N/a	—N/a
Warna Agung	Defunct	—N/a	1994–95	—N/a	1	0	—N/a	1	1979–80 (Galatama)	—N/a	—N/a

Note: Top division means the highest football competition in Indonesia which includes the Liga Indonesia Premier Division from 1994 until 2007 and the Indonesian Premier League during the dualism era.

- Top division began from 1994–95 season when Galatama and Perserikatan merged to form Liga Indonesia.

Notes:

Last played:

Former names:

Breakaway league:

Unofficial league:

=== All-time Super League table ===
The All-time Super League table is an overall record of all match results, points, and goals of every team that has played in Super League since its inception in 2008. The table is accurate as of the end of the 2025–26 season. The 2014 season used a two-region format and the 2023–24 season added a championship play-off after the regular season, therefore as per statistical convention in football, matches decided in extra time are counted as wins and losses, while matches decided by penalty shoot-outs are counted as draws. This all-time table also includes two abandoned seasons (2015 and 2020).

Pos	Team	S	Pld	W	D	L	GF	GA	GD	Pts	1st	2nd
1	Persib	16	473	238	124	111	780	526	+254	838	4	1
2	Persija	16	440	205	123	132	684	494	+190	738	1	1
3	Arema (Note: Include stats as Arema Indonesia and Arema Cronus.)	16	468	207	107	154	715	575	+140	725 (Note: Arema were deducted 3 points in 2013 season.)	1	2
4	Bali United (Note: Include stats as Persisam Putra and Putra Samarinda.)	15	431	195	93	143	674	550	+124	678	2	1
5	Madura United (Note: Include stats as Pelita Jaya, Pelita Bandung Raya, and Persipasi Bandung Raya.)	16	472	172	119	181	641	642	−1	632 (Note: Madura United were deducted 3 points in 2017 season.)	–	1
6	Persipura	12	333	177	89	67	604	331	+273	617 (Note: Persipura were deducted 3 points in 2021–22 season.)	3	3
7	PSM	13	365	145	107	113	504	443	+61	542	1	1
8	Borneo Samarinda (Note: Include stats as Pusamania Borneo and Borneo.)	10	281	136	68	77	452	318	+134	476	–	1
9	Bhayangkara Presisi (Note: Include stats as Persebaya ISL and Bhayangkara.)	10	269	121	65	83	408	320	+88	425 (Note: Bhayangkara were deducted 3 points in 2014 season.)	1	–
10	Persebaya	9	274	112	76	76	406	353	+53	412	–	1
11	Persela	12	331	109	83	139	449	484	−35	410	–	–
12	Sriwijaya	9	255	112	55	88	404	359	+45	391	1	–
13	Barito Putera	11	298	98	83	117	405	439	–34	377	–	–
14	Persikabo 1973 (Note: Include stats as Persiram, PS TNI, PS TIRA, and TIRA-Persikabo.)	11	297	87	77	133	388	469	−81	338	–	–
15	Persik	9	261	87	67	107	340	380	−40	328	–	–
16	Persita	9	261	76	65	120	279	394	−115	293	–	–
17	PSIS	8	241	75	56	110	254	334	−80	281	–	–
18	Persiba Balikpapan	8	219	75	52	92	289	314	−25	277	–	–
19	Persiwa	5	164	74	23	67	250	242	+8	245	–	1
20	Mitra Kukar	6	164	70	26	68	255	262	−7	236	–	–
21	Semen Padang	7	192	56	52	84	209	276	–67	220	–	–
22	Dewa United Banten (Note: Include stats as Dewa United.)	4	136	55	36	45	202	171	+31	201	–	1
23	PSS	6	173	52	42	69	213	254	–41	195 (Note: PSS were deducted 3 points in 2024–25 season.)	–	–
24	Persis	4	136	42	38	56	173	199	−26	164	–	–
25	Persijap	5	150	43	35	72	152	235	−83	164	–	–
26	Badak Lampung (Note: Include stats as Perseru.)	5	124	36	31	57	128	182	−54	139	–	–
27	PSPS	4	130	39	20	71	147	245	−98	134 (Note: PSPS were deducted 3 points in 2010−11 season.)	–	–
28	Gresik United	5	125	32	27	66	129	253	−124	120 (Note: Gresik United were deducted 3 points in 2017 season.)	–	–
29	Java United (Note: Include stats as Malut United.)	2	68	30	20	18	116	86	+30	110	–	–
30	PSMS	3	102	26	26	50	134	186	−52	101 (Note: PSMS were deducted 3 points in 2018 season.)	–	–
31	Bontang (Note: Include stats as PKT Bontang.)	3	96	24	24	48	129	185	−56	96	–	–
32	Deltras	3	96	25	18	53	98	155	−57	93	–	–
33	Persidafon	2	68	21	13	34	96	126	−30	76	–	–
34	Persepam	2	54	18	12	24	70	86	−16	66	–	–
35	PSBS	2	68	17	15	36	75	142	−67	66	–	–
36	Persitara	2	68	16	16	36	77	107	−30	64	–	–
37	RANS Nusantara	2	68	11	21	36	76	132	–56	54	–	–
38	PSIM	1	34	11	12	11	43	44	−1	45	–	–
39	Persema	1	34	13	6	15	43	52	−9	45	–	–
40	Kalteng Putra	1	34	8	7	19	33	54	−21	31	–	–
41	PSAP	1	34	6	9	19	33	66	−33	27	–	–
42	Persiraja	2	37	3	9	25	19	69	–50	18	–	–
43	Persiba Bantul	1	20	2	3	15	17	53	−36	9	–	–
44	Garudayaksa	0	0	0	0	0	0	0	0	0	–	–
45	Isenmulang Kalteng	0	0	0	0	0	0	0	0	0	–	–

Notes:

Point deductions:

League or status at 2026–27:

2026–27 Super League teams
2026–27 Championship teams
2026–27 Liga Nusantara teams
2026–27 Liga 4 teams
Teams with no status
Defunct teams

== Foreign players ==
Super League's policy on foreign players has changed multiple times since its inception.

- 2008–2013: 5 foreign players including 2 Asian quota.
- 2014: 4 foreign players including 1 Asian quota and only 3 can be on the field at a time.
- 2015: 3 foreign players. All 3 players can be on the field.
- 2017: 4 foreign players including 1 Asian quota and 1 marquee player quota. All 4 players can be on the field.
- 2018–2023: 4 foreign players including 1 Asian quota. All 4 players can be on the field.
- 2023–2024: 6 foreign players including 1 ASEAN quota. All 6 players can be on the field.
- 2024–2025: 8 foreign players and only 6 can be on the field at a time.
- 2025–present: 11 foreign players and only 9 can be on the matchday squad, with 7 on the field.

== Champions ==
=== Season-by-season records ===
Season	League name	Champions	Runners-up
1994–95	Liga Indonesia Premier Division	Persib	Petrokimia Putra
1995–96	Liga Indonesia Premier Division	Bandung Raya	PSM
1996–97	Liga Indonesia Premier Division	Persebaya	Bandung Raya
1997–98	Liga Indonesia Premier Division	Season abandoned due to political and economic turmoil	
1998–99	Liga Indonesia Premier Division	PSIS	Persebaya
1999–2000	Liga Indonesia Premier Division	PSM	Pupuk Kaltim
2001	Liga Indonesia Premier Division	Persija	PSM
2002	Liga Indonesia Premier Division	Petrokimia Putra	Persita
2003	Liga Indonesia Premier Division	Persik	PSM
2004	Liga Indonesia Premier Division	Persebaya	PSM
2005	Liga Indonesia Premier Division	Persipura	Persija
2006	Liga Indonesia Premier Division	Persik	PSIS
2007–08	Liga Indonesia Premier Division	Sriwijaya	PSMS
2008–09	Indonesia Super League	Persipura	Persiwa
2009–10	Indonesia Super League	Arema	Persipura
2010–11	Indonesia Super League	Persipura	Arema
2011–12 (IPL)	Indonesian Premier League	Semen Padang	Persebaya 1927
2011–12 (ISL)	Indonesia Super League	Sriwijaya	Persipura
2013	Indonesia Super League	Persipura	Arema
2014	Indonesia Super League	Persib	Persipura
2015	Indonesia Super League	Season abandoned due to FIFA suspension of Indonesia	
2017	Liga 1	Bhayangkara	Bali United
2018	Liga 1	Persija	PSM
2019	Liga 1	Bali United	Persebaya
2020	Liga 1	Season abandoned due to COVID-19 pandemic in Indonesia	
2021–22	Liga 1	Bali United	Persib
2022–23	Liga 1	PSM	Persija
2023–24	Liga 1	Persib	Madura United
2024–25	Liga 1	Persib	Dewa United
2025–26	Super League	Persib	Borneo Samarinda

=== Titles by club ===
Bold indicates current participating clubs. Italic indicates defunct clubs.

Club	Champions	Runners-up	Winning seasons	Runner-up seasons
**Persib**	5	1	1994–95, 2014, 2023–24, 2024–25, 2025–26	2021–22
Persipura	4	3	2005, 2008–09, 2010–11, 2013	2009–10, 2011–12 (ISL), 2014
**PSM**	2	5	1999–2000, 2022–23	1995–96, 2001, 2003, 2004, 2018
**Persebaya**	2	3	1996–97, 2004	1998–99, 2011–12 (IPL), 2019
**Persija**	2	2	2001, 2018	2005, 2022–23
**Bali United**	2	1	2019, 2021–22	2017
**Persik**	2	–	2003, 2006	–
Sriwijaya	2	–	2007–08, 2011–12 (ISL)	–
**Arema**	1	2	2009–10	2010–11, 2013
Bandung Raya	1	1	1995–96	1996–97
PSIS	1	1	1998–99	2006
Petrokimia Putra	1	1	2002	1994–95
Semen Padang	1	–	2011–12 (IPL)	–
**Bhayangkara Presisi**	1	–	2017	–
Pupuk Kaltim	–	1	–	1999–2000
**Persita**	–	1	–	2002
PSMS	–	1	–	2007–08
Persiwa	–	1	–	2008–09
**Madura United**	–	1	–	2023–24
**Dewa United**	–	1	–	2024–25
**Borneo Samarinda**	–	1	–	2025–26

== Relegation history ==
=== Premier Division era (1994–2008) ===
Season	West division		East division	
Season	16th place	17th place	16th place	17th place
1994–95	PS Bengkulu (20)	Warna Agung (11)	PSIR (21)	PSIM (18)
Season	West division		East division	
Season	15th		16th	
1995–96	BPD Jateng (22)		Persegres (15)	

Season	West division	Central division	East division
Season	11th	11th	11th
1996–97	Persijatim (3)	Mataram Indocement (18)	Persedikab (13)
1998–99	Persita (7)	Persikabo (6)	Persiba (12)

Season	West division					East division				
Season	10th place	11th place	12th place	13th place	14th place	10th place	11th place	12th place	13th place	14th place
1999–2000	—N/a	—N/a	—N/a	Indocement Cirebon (25)	Medan Jaya (16)	—N/a	—N/a	—N/a	PSIS (24)	PSIM (19)
2001	—N/a	—N/a	Persiraja (25)	PSP (22)	Persikabo (21)	—N/a	—N/a	Persijap (23)	Persma (23)	Putra Samarinda (14)
2002	PSBL (26)	PSMS (24)	Persikab (5)	Only 12 clubs		Persema (29)	Persebaya (23)	Persedikab (12)	Only 12 clubs	

Season	Clubs (points)				
Season	Play-off loser	17th	18th	19th	20th
2003	Perseden (48)	Arema (44)	Petrokimia Putra (42)	PSDS (41)	Barito Putera (38)

Season	Sanction	2nd in play-off	3rd in play-off	4th in play-off
2005	Persebaya	Pelita Krakatau Steel	PSPS	Petrokimia Putra

=== Indonesia Super League era (2009–2015) ===
Season	Clubs (points)			
Season	15th	16th	17th	18th
2008–09	PSMS (31)^{†}	Deltras (29)	Persita (25)	PSIS (21)
2009–10	—N/a	Persik (39)	Persebaya (36)	Persitara (28)
2010–11	Bontang (15)^{†}	Only 15 clubs participated		
2011–12	—N/a	PSMS (36)	Deltras (35)	PSAP (27)
2013	—N/a	Persidafon (30)	Persiwa (30)	PSPS (17)
Season	West region		East region	
Season	10th	11th	10th	11th
2014	Persita (15)	Persijap (8)	Persepam Madura United (23)	Persiba Bantul (9)

† Lost the promotion/relegation play-off and relegated

=== Indonesian Premier League era (2011–2013) ===
Season	Clubs (points)
2011–12	PSMS (10)
2013	Bontang, PSLS, PSIR, Persiraja, Pro Duta^{†}, Persepar^{†}, Perseman^{†}

† Did not pass the verification process to participate in the 2014 ISL

=== Liga 1 era (2017–2025) ===
Season	Clubs (points)		
Season	16th	17th	18th
2017	Semen Padang (35)	Persiba Balikpapan (27)	Persegres (7)
2018	Mitra Kukar (39)	Sriwijaya (39)	PSMS (34)
2019	Badak Lampung (33)	Semen Padang (32)	Kalteng Putra (31)
2021–22	Persipura (36)	Persela (21)	Persiraja (13)
2023–24	RANS Nusantara (35)	Bhayangkara (26)	Persikabo 1973 (20)
2024–25	PSS (34)	Barito Putera (34)	PSIS (25)

=== Super League era (2025–present) ===
Season	Clubs (points)		
Season	16th	17th	18th
2025–26	Persis (34)	Semen Padang (20)	PSBS (18)

== Asian competitions ==
=== Current competition ranking ===
The current competition ranking are as follows.

==== All member associations ====
Only ranking 14–18 are shown.

Ranking				Member association (L: League, C: Cup, LC: League cup)	Club points								Total	2028–29 competition		
2026–27	2025–26	Mvmt	Region	Member association (L: League, C: Cup, LC: League cup)	2018 (×0.3)	2019 (×0.4)	2021 (×0.5)	2022 (×0.6)	2023–24 (×0.7)	2024–25 (×0.8)	2025–26 (×0.9)	2026–27 (×1.0)	Total	ACLE	ACL2	ACGL
14	14	—	E 7	Singapore (L, C)	5.617	4.133	0.000	3.253	3.640	14.833	14.500	5.333	38.088	0+1	1+0	0
15	15	—	E 8	Vietnam (L, C)	3.267	10.752	6.000	5.300	5.400	11.333	8.667	5.133	37.241	0	1+1	0
16	20	▲ +4	E 9	Indonesia (L, C)	4.100	5.045	0.000	3.960	3.333	7.204	11.033	8.500	32.309	0	1+1	0
17	19	▲ +2	E 10	Cambodia (L, C)	2.250	1.000	0.000	2.070	5.620	11.000	10.100	7.333	31.474	0	1+1	0
18	18	—	W 8	Kuwait (L, C)	0.000	3.433	7.070	4.160	3.165	8.075	9.572	5.100	29.795	0	1+1	0

==== East Region only ====
Only ranking 7–11 are shown.

Ranking				Member association (L: League, C: Cup, LC: League cup)	Club points								Total	2028–29 competition		
Region	2026–27	2025–26	Mvmt	Member association (L: League, C: Cup, LC: League cup)	2018 (×0.3)	2019 (×0.4)	2021 (×0.5)	2022 (×0.6)	2023–24 (×0.7)	2024–25 (×0.8)	2025–26 (×0.9)	2026–27 (×1.0)	Total	ACLE	ACL2	ACGL
E 7	14	14	—	Singapore (L, C)	5.617	4.133	0.000	3.253	3.640	14.833	14.500	5.333	38.088	0+1	1+0	0
E 8	15	15	—	Vietnam (L, C)	3.267	10.752	6.000	5.300	5.400	11.333	8.667	5.133	37.241	0	1+1	0
E 9	16	20	▲ +4	Indonesia (L, C)	4.100	5.045	0.000	3.960	3.333	7.204	11.033	8.500	32.309	0	1+1	0
E 10	17	19	▲ +2	Cambodia (L, C)	2.250	1.000	0.000	2.070	5.620	11.000	10.100	7.333	31.474	0	1+1	0
E 11	23	22	▼ –1	Hong Kong (L, C)	3.300	3.650	7.333	6.587	4.900	3.333	4.333	3.667	23.732	0	0+1	0+1

=== Qualification criteria for 2027–28 Asian competitions ===
The 2026–27 Super League champions will qualify for the 2027–28 AFC Champions League Two group stage, while the runner-up will qualify for the 2027–28 AFC Champions League Two qualifying play-offs.

The number of places allocated to Indonesian clubs in AFC competitions is dependent upon the position the country holds in the AFC coefficient rankings, which are calculated based on the performance of teams in AFC competitions over the previous eight years.

=== Performance in Asian competition ===
Indonesian football clubs have participated in various Asian competitions organized by the Asian Football Confederation (AFC), including the AFC Champions League and the AFC Cup. PSMS Medan was the first Indonesian club to compete in Asia, securing fourth place in the 1970 Asian Champion Club Tournament. The highest finish is third place achieved by two clubs: Kramayudha Tiga Berlian in the 1986 Asian Club Championship and Pelita Jaya in the 1991 Asian Club Championship. Other notable performances include Persipura Jayapura reaching the AFC Cup semifinals in 2014 and PSM Makassar advancing to the ASEAN final in 2022. As of 2024, the AFC has restructured its club competitions, renaming them as the AFC Champions League Elite, AFC Champions League Two, and AFC Challenge League. Despite these efforts, Indonesian clubs have yet to secure a major continental title.

== Awards ==
=== Top scorers ===
Season	Player	Club	Goals	Apps	Ratio
1994–95	(Indonesia) Peri Sandria	Bandung Raya	34	Unknown	
1995–96	(Serbia) Dejan Gluščević	Bandung Raya	30	Unknown	
1996–97	(Brazil) Jacksen F. Tiago	Persebaya Surabaya	26	Unknown	
1997–98	(Indonesia) Kurniawan Dwi Yulianto (Note: At the time of the abandonment.)	Pelita Jaya	20	Unknown	
1998–99	(Gabon) Alain Mabenda	PSDS Deli Serdang	11	Unknown	
1999–2000	(Indonesia) Bambang Pamungkas	Persija Jakarta	24	30	0.8
2001	(Cameroon) Sadissou Bako	Barito Putera	22	Unknown	
2002	(Indonesia) Ilham Jaya Kesuma	Persita Tangerang	26	29	0.9
2003	(Chile) Óscar Aravena	PSM Makassar	31	Unknown	
2004	(Indonesia) Ilham Jaya Kesuma	Persita Tangerang	22	25	0.88
2005	(Uruguay) Cristian Gonzáles (Note: Had not been naturalized as an Indonesian citizen that time.)	Persik Kediri	25	30	0.83
2006	(Uruguay) Cristian Gonzáles	Persik Kediri	29	28	1.04
2007–08	(Uruguay) Cristian Gonzáles	Persik Kediri	32	25	1.28
2008–09	(Indonesia) Boaz Solossa	Persipura Jayapura	28	31	0.9
2008–09	(Uruguay) Cristian Gonzáles	Persik Kediri / Persib Bandung	28	28	1
2009–10	(Paraguay) Aldo Barreto	Bontang	19	32	0.59
2010–11	(Indonesia) Boaz Solossa	Persipura Jayapura	22	27	0.81
2011–12	(Brazil) Alberto Gonçalves	Persipura Jayapura	25	34	0.74
2013	(Indonesia) Boaz Solossa	Persipura Jayapura	25	32	0.78
2014	(Cameroon) Emmanuel Kenmogne	Persebaya ISL (Bhayangkara)	25	25	1
2015	Season abandoned due to FIFA suspension of Indonesia				
2017	(Netherlands) Sylvano Comvalius	Bali United	37	34	1.09
2018	(Serbia) Aleksandar Rakić	PS TIRA	21	34	0.62
2019	(Croatia) Marko Šimić	Persija Jakarta	28	32	0.88
2020	Season abandoned due to COVID-19 pandemic in Indonesia				
2021–22	(Indonesia) Ilija Spasojević	Bali United	23	34	0.68
2022–23	(Brazil) Matheus Pato	Borneo Samarinda	25	32	0.78
2023–24	(Brazil) David da Silva	Persib Bandung	30	34	0.88
2024–25	(Brazil) Alex Martins	Dewa United	26	25	1.04
2025–26	(Brazil) David da Silva	Malut United	23	34	0.68

=== Best players ===
Season	Player	Club
1994–95	(Indonesia) Widodo C. Putro	Petrokimia Putra
1995–96	(Indonesia) Ronny Wabia	Persipura Jayapura
1996–97	(Indonesia) Nur'alim	Bandung Raya
1998–99	(Indonesia) Ali Sunan	PSIS Semarang
1999–2000	(Indonesia) Bima Sakti	PSM Makassar
2001	(Indonesia) Bambang Pamungkas	Persija Jakarta
2002	(Indonesia) Ilham Jaya Kesuma	Persita Tangerang
2003	(Indonesia) Musikan	Persik Kediri
2004	(Indonesia) Ponaryo Astaman	PSM Makassar
2005	(Indonesia) Christian Warobay	Persipura Jayapura
2006	(Indonesia) Maman Abdurrahman	PSIS Semarang
2007–08	(Liberia) Zah Rahan Krangar	Sriwijaya
2008–09	(Indonesia) Boaz Solossa	Persipura Jayapura
2009–10	(Indonesia) Kurnia Meiga	Arema
2010–11	(Indonesia) Boaz Solossa	Persipura Jayapura
2011–12	(Saint Kitts and Nevis) Keith Gumbs	Sriwijaya
2013	(Indonesia) Boaz Solossa	Persipura Jayapura
2014	(Indonesia) Ferdinand Sinaga	Persib Bandung
2017	(Portugal) Paulo Sérgio	Bhayangkara
2018	(Nepal) Rohit Chand	Persija Jakarta
2019	(Brazil) Renan Silva	Borneo
2021–22	(Japan) Taisei Marukawa	Persebaya Surabaya
2022–23	(Netherlands) Wiljan Pluim	PSM Makassar
2023–24	(Mexico) Francisco Rivera	Madura United
2024–25	(Spain) Tyronne del Pino	Persib Bandung
2025–26	(Argentina) Mariano Peralta	Borneo Samarinda

=== Best young players ===
Season	Player	Club
2013	(Indonesia) Syakir Sulaiman	Persiba Balikpapan
2014	(Indonesia) Hendra Bayauw	Semen Padang
2017	(Indonesia) Rezaldi Hehanusa	Persija Jakarta
2018	(Indonesia) Osvaldo Haay	Persebaya Surabaya
2019	(Indonesia) Todd Rivaldo Ferre	Persipura Jayapura
2021–22	(Indonesia) Marselino Ferdinan	Persebaya Surabaya
2022–23	(Indonesia) Rio Fahmi	Persija Jakarta
2023–24	(Indonesia) Fajar Fathur Rahman	Borneo Samarinda
2024–25	(Indonesia) Arkhan Fikri	Arema
2025–26	(Indonesia) Dony Tri Pamungkas	Persija Jakarta

=== Best goalkeepers ===
Season	Player	Club
2013	(South Korea) Yoo Jae-hoon	Persipura Jayapura
2014	(Latvia) Deniss Romanovs	Pelita Bandung Raya
2025–26	(Indonesia) Nadeo Argawinata	Borneo Samarinda

=== Best coaches ===
Season	Coach	Club
2013	(Brazil) Jacksen F. Tiago	Persipura Jayapura
2018	(Brazil) Stefano Cugurra	Persija Jakarta
2019	(Brazil) Stefano Cugurra	Bali United
2021–22	(Indonesia) Aji Santoso	Persebaya Surabaya
2022–23	(Portugal) Bernardo Tavares	PSM Makassar
2023–24	(Croatia) Bojan Hodak	Persib Bandung
2024–25	(Croatia) Bojan Hodak	Persib Bandung
2025–26	(Croatia) Bojan Hodak	Persib Bandung

=== Best goals ===
Season	Player	Club	Opponent	Date
2017	(Indonesia) Septian David	Mitra Kukar	Persiba Balikpapan	10 November 2017
2019	(Brazil) David da Silva	Persebaya Surabaya	Arema	12 December 2019
2021–22	(Portugal) Carlos Fortes	Arema	Persija Jakarta	5 February 2022
2022–23	(Brazil) Matheus Pato	Borneo Samarinda	Bali United	3 April 2023
2024–25	(Indonesia) Rizky Ridho	Persija Jakarta	Arema	9 March 2025
2025–26	(Indonesia) Muhammad Iqbal	PSIM Yogyakarta	Madura United	17 May 2026

=== Fair play teams ===
Season	Club
1998–99	Semen Padang
2006	Persmin Minahasa
2007–08	Persipura Jayapura
2009–10	Sriwijaya
2010–11	Persijap Jepara
2011–12	PSPS Pekanbaru
2013	Persipura Jayapura
2014	Arema Cronus
2017	Perseru Serui
2018	Barito Putera
2019	TIRA-Persikabo
2021–22	Madura United
2022–23	Bhayangkara
2023–24	Borneo Samarinda
2024–25	Malut United
2025–26	Borneo Samarinda

=== Best referees ===
Season	Referee
2017	Musthofa Umarella
2018	Thoriq Alkatiri
2019	Yudi Nurcahya
2021–22	Thoriq Alkatiri
2022–23	Bangbang Syamsudar
2023–24	Nendi Rohaendi
2024–25	Rio Permana Putra

== Sponsorship ==
Liga Indonesia has been sponsored since 1994. The sponsor has been able to determine the league's sponsorship name. The list below details who the sponsors have been and what they called the competition:

Period	Sponsor(s)	Brand	Ref.
1994–1996	Dunhill	Liga Dunhill	
1996–1997	Kansas	Liga Kansas	
1997–1999	No sponsor	Ligina (Liga Indonesia)	–
1999–2004	Bank Mandiri	Liga Bank Mandiri	
2005–2008	Djarum	Liga Djarum Indonesia	
2008–2011	Djarum	Djarum Indonesia Super League	
2011–2014	No sponsor	Indonesia Super League	
2015	QNB Group	QNB League	
2017	Go-Jek and Traveloka	Go-Jek Traveloka Liga 1	
2018	Go-Jek	Go-Jek Liga 1	
2019–2020	Shopee	Shopee Liga 1	
2021–2025	Bank Rakyat Indonesia	BRI Liga 1	
2025–present	Bank Rakyat Indonesia	BRI Super League	

Bundled references:

== Media coverage ==
=== Current ===
Broadcaster	Coverage	Year	Summary	Ref.
(Indonesia) Emtek	Free-to-air TV	2018–2027	Five to nine matches per week, live on Indosiar. Most big matches only available through digital terrestrial antenna.	
(Indonesia) Emtek	Streaming	2018–2027	Live on Vidio Premier (pay). Five to seven live matches per week (including big matches) must require a subscription (live coverage only available for Indonesia viewers) and non-Vidio Premier live matches (excluding big matches) available for free, with free highlights and free full coverage of 306 matches available in Indonesia and other countries through on demand (Indosiar and Super League official Vidio channels).	
(Indonesia) Emtek	Pay TV	2021–2027	Matches available for Nex Parabola customers.	
(Indonesia) Sin Po Media	Free-to-air TV	2025–present	Live on Sin Po TV.	

=== Former ===
Year	Broadcaster			Ref.
Year	Free-to-air TV	Pay TV	Streaming	Ref.
1994–1999	(Indonesia) TVRI (Indonesia) ANteve	—N/a	—N/a	
1999–2001	(Indonesia) TVRI (Indonesia) RCTI	—N/a	—N/a	
2002	(Indonesia) TVRI (Indonesia) ANteve	—N/a	—N/a	
2003	(Indonesia) SCTV (Indonesia) ANTV	—N/a	—N/a	
2004	(Indonesia) ANTV (Indonesia) TV7 (Indonesia) Trans TV	—N/a	—N/a	
2005–2006	(Indonesia) ANTV (Indonesia) TV7	—N/a	—N/a	
2007–2012	(Indonesia) ANTV	—N/a	—N/a	
2013	(Indonesia) VIVA (Note: ANTV and tvOne)	—N/a	—N/a	
2014	(Indonesia) MNC Media (Note: RCTI, MNCTV, and Global TV) (Indonesia) Kompas TV (Note: First round only)	(Indonesia) K-Vision	(Indonesia) Domikado (Note: Second round to final in 2014)	
2015	(Indonesia) MNC Media (Indonesia) NET.	(Indonesia) Lippo Group (Note: First Media and Big TV) (Indonesia) Matrix Garuda	(Indonesia) Domikado	
2017	(Indonesia) tvOne	(Indonesia) OrangeTV	(Malaysia) iflix (Malaysia) SportsFix	
2018	(Indonesia) O Channel (Indonesia) tvOne	(Indonesia) OrangeTV (Indonesia) Matrix Garuda (Indonesia) IndiHome	(Malaysia) SportsFix	
2019	(Indonesia) O Channel/Moji	(Indonesia) Matrix Garuda (Indonesia) IndiHome	—N/a	
2020–2022	(Indonesia) O Channel/Moji	(Indonesia) MVN (Note: K-Vision, MNC Vision, and MNC Play) (Indonesia) IndiHome	(Indonesia) Vision+	
2022–2023	(Indonesia) O Channel/Moji	(Indonesia) IndiHome	—N/a	
2023–2025	—N/a	(Indonesia) MVN (Note: K-Vision and MNC Vision)	—N/a	

Bundled references:

Networks/providers:

Rounds:

== Commercial partners ==
Year	Partner
2013–2015	BV Sports
2017–2020	Gelora Trisula Semesta
2021–present	Karya Kreasi Bangsa

== See also ==
- Elite Pro Academy
- Championship
- Liga Nusantara
- Liga 4
- Piala Indonesia
- Piala Presiden
- I-League Cup
- Indonesian football league system
- List of football clubs in Indonesia
- List of football clubs in Indonesia by major honours won
- List of top-division football clubs in AFC countries
- List of association football competitions
- Football records and statistics in Indonesia
- Indonesia XI
