= MHR Fund Management =

Private equity firm

- Company type: Private
- Industry: Private Equity
- Founded: 1996
- Headquarters: New York, New York
- Key people: Mark Rachesky
- Products: Leveraged buyout, Distressed securities
- Total assets: $658 million
- Website: www.mhrfund.com

MHR Fund Management is a private equity firm focusing on leveraged buyout and distressed securities transactions in the United States. The firm specializes in turnaround, buyouts and undervalued middle-market companies, most notably in the entertainment, communications and energy sectors.

== History ==
MHR Fund Management was co-founded in 1996 by Mark Rachesky, MD and Hal Goldstein. From 1990-1996, Rachesky had worked under Carl Icahn as senior investment officer and chief investment advisor at Icahn Enterprises before opening MHR with Goldstein. Notable investments have included Lions Gate Entertainment Corporation, Titan Tire Corporation, Leap Wireless and Loral Space & Communications, among others.

In 2004, MHR began accumulating shares in Lionsgate.
