= Celestial's Shaw Brothers Film Library =

Celestial's Shaw Brothers Film Library is the world's largest Chinese film library (wholly owned by Celestial Pictures), consisting of over 760 feature films originally released over a forty-year timeframe (from the 1950s to the 1990s) and produced by the Shaw Brothers Studio. The genres in the library include kung fu, action, martial arts, erotica, comedy, horror, situational drama, musical, period drama, and thriller.

== Digital remastering ==
In the past, very few titles from the Shaw Brothers film archive had previously appeared in any electronic multimedia form since their original cinema release in the 50s-90s.

Beginning in 2002, Celestial Pictures employed the use of state-of-the-art digital technology to restore each and every frame (150,000 on average) from the original negatives for over 760 films. They would be released on DVD from that same year onward; the sound and picture quality of those films have been considered by film fans around the world to be even more stunning than the original cinematic prints.

== Actors & actresses ==
An A-list lineup of film stars is one of the major attractions of the library, many of whom still dominate the East Asian film industry, including Jet Li, Chow Yun-fat, Stephen Chow, Gordon Liu, Cheng Pei-pei, Maggie Cheung, and Andy Lau.

== Directors & crew ==
The Shaw Brothers Studio also nurtured the careers of many modern, talented and high-profile filmmakers, including John Woo, Yuen Woo Ping and Tony Ching Siu-tung.

The studio's legendary martial-arts directors include (but are not limited to) Chang Cheh, King Hu, Liu Chia-liang and Chu Yuan. Their distinguished martial arts styles continue to influence action films around the world to this day.

== List of genres in the library ==
- Kung Fu
- Action
- Martial Arts
- Erotica
- Comedy
- Horror
- Situational Drama
- Musical
- Period Drama
- Thriller
