= CHK (TV channel) =

Southeast Asian television channel

CHK HD
- Country: China; Singapore
- Broadcast area: Singapore
- Headquarters: Suite 1603, Kwun Tong Harbour Plaza, 182 Wai Yip Street, Kwun Tong, Hong Kong SAR, China

Programming
- Languages: Cantonese; Mandarin
- Picture format: 1080i (HDTV)

Ownership
- Owner: Celestial Tiger Entertainment
- Sister channels: Celestial Movies; Celestial Classic Movies; KIX; Thrill

History
- Launched: 18 October 2013
- Closed: 1 October 2021
- Replaced by: CM+

Links
- Website: chk-tv.com

CHK HD (stylized as cHK HD) is a Southeast Asian pay television channel owned by Celestial Tiger Entertainment and billed as a Hong Kong general entertainment hub featuring movies, lifestyle programs and dramas for all Singtel TV customers in Singapore. The high-definition channel was launched on 18 October 2013 with Hong Kong celebrities Bernice Liu, Him Law and Liu Kai Chi.

The channel was continued to be operated as Video on Demand channel, awhile CHK live channel has been replaced by its sister channel Celestial Movies as CM+, which served as alternative to Star Chinese Movies.

== Programming blocks ==
The channel's programming consists of movies, television series, travel documentaries, and news roundups from Hong Kong.

Saturday Night Blockbuster

CHK HD premieres the latest Hong Kong blockbuster movies, notably released theatrically within the past 12 months, in a weekly evening time slot every Saturday at 9PM SGT/MAL-8PM JKT. Programs airing in this block include Unbeatable, Switch, Out of Inferno, The Guillotines, and Christmas Rose.

Sunday Drama Night

Drama series tackling cultural, societal, and political issues in Hong Kong are shown every Sunday at 9PM SGT/MAL-8PM JKT. Programs airing in this block include Hope and Despair, F.S.D., Ombudsman Special, The Moment, and I.T. Champions.

Weekday Primetime Movies

Repeat showings and classic screenings of notable Hong Kong movie hits air Monday through Friday at 9PM SGT/MAL-8PM JKT. Programs airing in this block include Initial D, Infernal Affairs, Confession of Pain, My Young Auntie, and Ip Man.

C Nights

A signature time-belt focused on scary, violent, and risque shows air Monday through Friday at 10PM SGT/MAL-9PM JKT, Saturday and Sunday at 11PM SGT/MAL-10PM JKT. Programs airing in this block include Magic Beauty, The Unbelievable, Career of Seven Ladies, and SFC in Action.
