= Animax (African TV channel) =

- Broadcast area: Sub-Saharan Africa
- Headquarters: Johannesburg, South Africa

Programming
- Language: English
- Picture format: 4:3 SDTV

Ownership
- Owner: Sony Pictures Television International

History
- Launched: 3 November 2007; 18 years ago
- Closed: 31 October 2010; 15 years ago
- Replaced by: Sony Max

Animax was the South Africa-based African version of the anime channel of the same name. It was launched on 3 November 2007 on the DStv platform. While the channel initially carried anime, by 2009, the channel started airing reality shows, in a pattern similar to other foreign feeds at the time. The channel closed on 31 October 2010, being replaced by Sony Max, which only carried action series and reality shows.

== History ==
SPTI reported to the specialist press on 23 August 2007 that it would launch an African version of Animax by the end of the year, starting in the southern African region, alongside the local feed of Sony Entertainment Television.

In October, DStv confirmed the launch date as being 3 November as part of the launch of five new channels on the provider (SET Africa launched the previous day). The channel targeted the 15-29 demographic.

In August 2009, the channel started experiencing channel drift with the inclusion of concert films in its schedule. Later that year, Animax was already running Sasuke (in its international version as Ninja Warrior. By January 2010, numerous other reality shows had consumed the channel's schedule, such as Next, Solitary and Kenny vs. Spenny during prime time.

The cause for the inclusion of such programming was because Animax had failed to promote both in the run-up to its launch and during its run, as well as a lack of variety (most of the limited number of anime seen on the channel were dubbed). A brief incursion into original tracks (Japanese with English subtitles) failed. The channel also aired anime in the wrong episode order early on.

Finally, on 25 October 2010, SPTI and DStv confirmed the closure of the channel on 31 October at 23:25, with the latter justifying it on audience metrics and the limited appeal of anime. A new channel would take over in February 2011 (later revealed to be Sony Max), which would subsequently absorb most of its reality show inventory.
