= Mark Rachesky =

American businessman

- Born: 1960 (age 65–66)
- Education: B.S. University of Pennsylvania; M.B.A. and M.D. Stanford University
- Known for: Chairman of Lions Gate Entertainment

Mark H. Rachesky (born 1960) is chairman of Lionsgate and head of MHR Fund Management, a $5 billion investment firm. The investment firm's holdings include a stake in Lions Gate as well as investments in the trucking and energy sectors.

== Early life ==
Born to a Jewish family, Rachesky graduated with a B.S. in Biology from the University of Pennsylvania and later earned a M.B.A. and a M.D. from Stanford University.

== Philanthropy ==
He and his wife run a charitable foundation that supports UJA Federation of New York, the Museum of Jewish Heritage, Trinity School and the University of Pennsylvania.

== Personal life ==
Rachesky is married to Jill Rachesky; they have four children, Kate, Allison, Samantha, and Steven.
