= Todd Miller (media executive) =

American media executive

Todd Miller is an American-born media executive and the Chief Executive Officer of Celestial Tiger Entertainment (CTE), a diversified media company headquartered in Hong Kong. The company creates and distributes branded television services and is a venture between Saban Capital Group; Celestial Pictures, a company owned by Astro Overseas Limited; and Lionsgate, the world's largest independent filmed entertainment studio.

Celestial Tiger Entertainment owns and operates a portfolio of Asian entertainment channels, including: Celestial Movies and Celestial Movies HD, premium movie channels featuring current Chinese films; Celestial Classic Movies, featuring classic Chinese films principally from the Shaw Brothers library; Celestial Movies Pinoy, a Filipino dubbed Asian movie channel jointly-marketed with Viva Communications; cHK, a contemporary Chinese movie and entertainment channel; KIX HD, an action entertainment service comprising combat sports, action movies and action series; Thrill, featuring horror, thriller and suspense programming; and Miao Mi, a Mandarin language education and entertainment channel targeting preschoolers ages 3–6.

Todd Miller held various international television executive positions at Sony Pictures Entertainment between 1994 and 2011. As Executive Vice President, Networks, Asia-Pacific for Sony Pictures Television, Miller oversaw Sony Pictures' channel portfolio in the Asia-Pacific region, including AXN Asia, Animax Asia, Sony ONE, and Sony Entertainment Television and channel joint ventures in Korea, Australia and India. As Executive Vice President and Managing Director, Asia for Sony Pictures Television International, Miller oversaw the studio's channels, content licensing, and television production activities in Asia, including Huaso, the first-ever Sino-US film and television production joint venture.

Miller has served multiple terms on the Board of Directors of CASBAA, the Association for the multi-channel audio-visual content creation and distribution industry across Asia. Miller also serves on the Vanderbilt Alumni Association Board of Directors and on the Board of the Media Policy Center, based in Santa Monica, California.

Todd Miller received an MBA with Beta Gamma Sigma honors from Columbia Business School (Columbia University) in 1994. Miller was graduated magna cum laude with a Bachelor of Arts degree in economics from Vanderbilt University in 1988.

Miller cycled more than 10,000 km across the North American and European continents in 2010 and 2011 respectively, raising over US$50,000, in support of two Asian children's charities: A New Day Cambodia, located in Phnom Penh, Cambodia, and Yaowawit, located in Phang Nga, Thailand.
