= Celestial Tiger Entertainment =

Media company

- Formerly: Tiger Gate Entertainment (2008-2011)
- Type: Joint venture
- Industry: Entertainment
- Founded: 2008; 18 years ago
- Headquarters: Suite 1603, Kwun Tong Harbour Plaza, 182 Wai Yip Street, Kwun Tong, Hong Kong SAR, China
- Key people: Todd Miller (President and CEO)
- Products: Television channels; Films; Television programs
- Brands: Celestial Movies; Kix; Thrill; CMGO
- Owners: Saban Capital Group; Celestial Pictures; Starz Entertainment
- Website: www.celestialtiger.com

Celestial Tiger Entertainment (CTE), formerly Tiger Gate Entertainment, is a diversified media company based in Hong Kong that operates pay television entertainment channels in Asia and oversees Lionsgate Studios distribution rights in Greater China and Southeast Asia. It is a joint venture co-owned by Saban Capital Group, Starz Entertainment and Celestial Pictures.

== Overview ==
Celestial Tiger Entertainment was founded in 2008 as Tiger Gate Entertainment, as a joint venture between private media investment firm Saban Capital Group and entertainment company Lionsgate. Pay television channels Kix and Thrill were later launched in August 2009.

Celestial Pictures Limited joined Tiger Gate Entertainment in late 2011 adding the already established Celestial Classic Movies and Celestial Movies to the company's channel lineup. Following this partnership, the company was renamed Celestial Tiger Entertainment and the high definition (HD) feed was added to existing channels for territories in Asia.

In 2013, cHK was launched in Singapore with Hong Kong celebrities Bernice Liu, Him Law and Liu Kai-chi hosting a media event to promote cHK as a Hong Kong general entertainment channel.

On August 15, 2024, CTE launches its first Chinese movie streaming app, CMGO, in Singapore, with Malaysia following on November 19, 2024. The app focuses on the latest and greatest Chinese movies from China, Hong Kong, Taiwan, and Southeast Asia.

=== Lionsgate/Starz partnership ===
CTE owns the Shaw Brothers film library and leverages a library of film and TV from Lionsgate.

In February 2012, YOU On Demand Holdings and Lionsgate announced deal to show a number of Lionsgate films on a Transactional Video On Demand (TVOD) and Subscription Video On Demand (SVOD) basis in China.

In 2013, CTE sold over 1700 hours of Lionsgate TV series and movies (including Anger Management, The Twilight Saga: Breaking Dawn – Part 2, and the Hunger Games franchise) to broadcasters and media platforms in southeast Asia and China as part of a regional distribution deal. CTE also expanded its Southeast Asian distribution deal with Lionsgate to cover Japan and Korea, and sold a further 700 hours of TV series and feature films in an SVOD deal with MediaCorp’s Toggle digital platform in Singapore.

== Channels ==
Celestial Tiger Entertainment operates the following channels:

- Celestial Movies - A channel featuring current Asian films and entertainment news
  - Available in Malaysia, Brunei, South Korea, Indonesia, Philippines, and Singapore, also Upcoming in Thailand, Myanmar.
- Celestial Classic Movies* - Featuring classic Hong Kong Chinese films
  - Available in Australia, Myanmar, Cambodia, Hong Kong, Indonesia, Philippines, Singapore, Thailand and Malaysia, formerly available in Taiwan.
- Celestial Movies Pinoy** - Filipino and English dubbed, Original Language subtitles in English Asian movie channel distributed and marketed by Viva Communications.
  - Available only in the Philippines via Cignal TV Channel 40 SD.
- cHK - Local Hong Kong entertainment and showbiz news channel
  - Available only in Singapore until 2021
- CM+ - Featuring the latest blockbusters and exclusive movies from across Asia
  - Available only in Singapore via Singtel TV Channel 571.
- PopC - Featuring Chinese online movies from China
  - Available only in Hong Kong via myTV SUPER Channel 206.
- Kix* - Action, MMA, TV series, reality television and extreme sports
  - Available in Hong Kong, Indonesia, Philippines, Myanmar, Vietnam and Cambodia, formerly available in Malaysia, Thailand, and Singapore. From October 2020, this channel is launched across Africa.
- Thrill* - Horror, thriller and suspense
  - Available in Hong Kong, Indonesia, Philippines, Macau, Myanmar, and Malaysia, formerly available in Thailand and Singapore.
- Miao Mi* - Mandarin Kids Channel.
  - Available in Thailand and South Korea.

* Distributed in the Philippines by Creative Programs
** Joint Venture with Viva Communications
