= Clive Ng =

Clive Ng is a media sector financier and executive. He has focused primarily on Asian business opportunities and has been instrumental in several joint-venture partnerships between American companies and Asian firms, particularly during the Internet and e-commerce boom of the late 1990s and early 2000s. He has also been a founding shareholder in Asian new media firms such as MTV Japan and E*TRADE Asia.

== Career ==
Clive Ng is the co-founder of C Ventures, a specialist "youth culture" investment firm established by Adrian Cheng, one of the world's most important investors in the "culture industry" space. Ng's work in Asian media began in the mid-1990s, as a proliferation of satellite space and a spate of programming piracy during this time inspired huge efforts by many mass media firms, most notably Rupert Murdoch's News Corp., to develop presences in Asian media markets.

=== Wilton Group, PLC ===
Working as deputy chairman of Wilton Group, PLC, a former consumer goods distribution firm based in London, UK, that transitioned to media and entertainment investment and finance, Ng spearheaded the company's entry into Asian media markets.

In a 1994 joint-venture partnership with Hong Kong–based Shaw Brothers Ltd (formerly Shaw Media Corp. and owners of Shaw Brothers Studio, Hong Kong's largest film production company), Ng's Wilton team financed the establishment of a Chinese-language satellite television channel for Chinese-speaking communities in Europe called Chinese Channel. It was the first European network of its kind, broadcasting programs primarily produced by Hong Kong Television Broadcasting Ltd, the world's largest Chinese-language entertainment producer at the time.

Later in 1994, Ng acquired for Wilton a 20% stake in the Asian interests of Denver-based cable television operator United International Holdings (now Liberty Global), with which Ng had worked previously while managing a Denver investment fund. He then set up a joint venture between UIH and United Artists Theatres, then the United States' largest cinema operator, to open a series of cineplexes in key cities in Asia. The first was in the Bugis Junction shopping mall in Singapore, followed by six other locations.

=== Pacific Media, PLC ===
In the late 90s, Wilton Group became Pacific Media, PLC. Ng was appointed CEO in 1999, when the company was experiencing a period of financial turmoil. Soon after his appointment as CEO, Ng negotiated an investment deal with Hong Kong Supernet, an Asian Internet provider, that precipitated a 1.89m HKP surge in pre-tax profits, greatly bolstering the financial health and reputation of the company.

Upon being named CEO, Ng transformed Pacific Media into a "shell" company and used it to invest in new Asian Internet ventures beginning in 2000. He secured financing from American investment bank Credit Suisse First Boston, and set forth a £70 million plan.

=== Asiacontent.com ===
One major result of these "shell" investments was the acquisition of internet company Asiacontent.com, which went public during the bursting of the dot-com bubble in April 2000 to become one of the first Asian initial public offerings to be listed on NASDAQ.

Prior to going public, in January 2000, Ng, with funding from Goldman Sachs, led Asiacontent into a joint venture with NBC Internet Inc (or NBCi), then the Internet arm of the American television network NBC, to create a series of websites in South Korea, Hong Kong, Singapore, Malaysia and Taiwan that would combine search engine functionality, news feeds and shopping links into sites similar to those of Yahoo!, the worldwide leader at the time. This came on the heels of similar successful NBCi ventures in Italy and France.

Under Ng's tenure as chairman of Asiacontent, the company also entered into many other major joint ventures in Asian media markets, and Asiacontent soon became the largest distributor of global content in Asia.

Among the partnerships were:

- DoubleClick Inc., an Internet advertising network which sold online advertising space to marketers. The venture formed a new company, DoubleClick Asia, in an effort to capitalise on a late-90s Asian Internet advertising boom.
- MTV Asia, the television network's Asian arm, and MTVi Group, its interactive division. The partnership with Ng's Asiacontent created new Chinese and Korean web presences for MTV.
- CBS Sportsline, which joined with Asiacontent to create a network of sports-related websites throughout Asia, including Singapore and Korea.
- CNET and Asiacontent produced a series of Asian-language CNET sites across the region.
- Licensing agreements to bring E!Online and France's Fashion TV to Asia.

Toward the end of 2000, amid the souring tech economy, Ng and Asiacontent Chief Executive Chris Justice expanded the company with an Internet solutions arm called Asiacontent Solutions, which offered web development and content management services for the Asian web presences of companies such as Sun Microsystems, Hachette Filipacchi, and L'Oréal.

In the years after the bursting of the dot-com bubble and ensuing stock market turmoil, Pacific Media soon became financially troubled. Media firm MediaXposure then invested $20 million in the flagging company in 2003 to keep it operational through the first quarter of 2004. In late 2006, after Pacific Media had regained its financial stability, Ng resigned from Pacific Media's board of directors to pursue other interests.

=== 8 Holdings ===
After leaving Pacific Media, Ng formed his own investment holding company, 8 Holdings, which specialised in mergers and acquisitions of Asian media companies. In 8 Holdings' largest deal, Ng joined in 2005 with Harlan Kleiman, former head of programming for US cable television network HBO, to co-ordinate investors in the acquisition of Chinese television advertising company China Media Network by Metaphor Corp. Ng was named CEO of Metaphor Corp. as part of the acquisition.

=== Investment in feature films ===
Ng has also invested in major motion pictures directed by Oliver Stone, including 1993's Heaven & Earth, the final in Stone's trilogy of films focused on the Vietnam War; and 1994's Natural Born Killers.

=== Fashion Networks International LLC ===
In 2009, Ng became chairman and principal shareholder of Fashion Networks International LLC, a digital media channel consisting of a network of fashion related websites and blogs. Fashion Networks' properties include NowManifest, Freshnet. NowManifest, a curated blog portal, boasts bloggers Anna Dello Russo, editor at large and creative consultant for Vogue Japan, Bryan Grey Yambao, and Derek Blasberg. Fashion Networks International was acquired by Fairchild Fashion Media in May 2012.

=== China Broadband, Inc. and YOU On Demand (CBBD.OB) ===
Ng was a founding partner and served as Executive chairman of China Broadband, Inc., now known as YOU on Demand Holdings, Inc. (Nasdaq:YOD), a national pay-per-view and video-on-demand platform in the People's Republic of China. China Broadband, Inc.'s common stock gained approval for quotation on the OTC Bulletin Board on 20 December 2007 and changed its name to YOU on Demand Holdings, Inc. in February 2011.

YOU on Demand is the first of its kind in China, offering movies through its Near Video on Demand (NVOD), Video on Demand (VOD) and Subscription Video on Demand (SVOD) services. Through its subsidiaries the Company engages in value-added services for cable providers, cable broadband, and publishing businesses in China. YOU on Demand is headquartered in New York, NY, with its China headquarters in Beijing.

Ng resigned from his post in 2010 to pursue other endeavours.

=== China Cablecom ===
Clive Ng is Founder and Executive chairman of China Cablecom Holdings, a joint-venture provider of cable television services in the People's Republic of China. The Company was founded in October 2006 and was approved for listing onto the NASDAQ Capital Markets on 30 July 2008.

In September 2007, China Cablecom gained operating rights of the Binzhou Broadcasting network in Binzhou, Shandong Province. China Cablecom entered into a series of asset purchase and services agreements with a company organised by State Owned Enterprises ("SOE"), owned directly or indirectly by local branches of China's State Administration of Radio, Film, and Television ("SARFT"), in five different municipalities to serve as a holding company of the relevant businesses.

Pursuant to the terms of an agreement and plan of merger, Jaguar, a special purpose acquisition company merged with and into China Cablecom Holdings, Ltd., its wholly owned British Virgin Islands subsidiary, for the purpose of re-domesticating Jaguar to the British Virgin Islands on 9 April 2008. This merger was the first of its kind for a US public company.

In May 2008, China Cablecom issued convertible notes with a principal value of $43,175,000 along with 1,524,994 shares of ordinary shares to a number of investors. China Cablecom also announced its achievement of "Foreign Private Issuer" status, for purposes of the rules and regulations of the US Securities and Exchange Commission. In addition, the company declared its entrance into a framework agreement with Hubei Chutian Broadcasting and Television Networks Co., Ltd., a local state-owned enterprise owned by the Hubei branches of SARFT. This act established a cable TV operation joint venture.

On 18 June 2008, China Cablecom announced the completion of the first phase, of its framework agreement with Hubei Chutian Broadcasting and Television Networks Co., Ltd., to acquire a 60 percent economic interest in Hubei Chutian Video & Information Network. This consummation secured over 800,000 additional paying subscribers for China Cablecom. Phase two would represent an additional 800,000 paying subscribers and is pending further due diligence and execution of definitive agreements.

On 9 October 2009, the Company underwent comprehensive restructuring of its outstanding debt obligations with holders of its Hubei assets and of its debt securities and majority holders of its ordinary shares. The restructuring strengthened the Company's balance sheet by reducing the overall principal amount of its long-term debt obligations and eliminated cash interest obligations on the new debt securities issued in exchange for its outstanding notes. Simultaneous to the restructuring, China Cablecom announced placement of $33 million in senior secured notes used to satisfy the Company's remaining obligations to the Hubei SOE under its amended framework agreement.

On 3 April 2012, the Company reported that, as per its previous announcement, the Company's joint venture partner Hubei Chutian Radio & Television Information Network Company Limited ("Hubei SOE") has agreed to purchase its Hubei assets for a total of RMB 374 million. The Company is pleased to announce today that it has received the first payment of RMB 50 million. In accordance to the terms of the agreement, the Company has signed a JV Termination agreement with Hubei Chutian Shi Xun Network Company Limited ("Hubei JV").

The company has announced that it will use proceeds of the sale to reduce the Company's outstanding debt and any excess proceeds will be used to increase shareholder value going forward. On 20 October 2011, the Company announced that it had received an offer from its joint venture partners to purchase its assets in Hubei. The acceptance by China Cablecom for the offer was mandated by the State Administration of Radio, Film, and Television (SARFT) and made in compliance with provincial regulatory policies.

On 15 November 2012, China Cablecom Holdings, Ltd. ("China Cablecom" or the "Company") ( OTCBB : CABLF ) announced that it has completed the redemption on the Company's principal note obligations. The notes paid in full include $19.1 million in senior secured, $16.2 million in junior secured, and $4.2 million in unsecured notes. The Board was pleased with the conclusion of the redemption and feel that their job as board members has been fulfilled upon the repayment of its notes. As a result, the Company announced the resignation of three of its Board members effective immediately. Mr. Robi Hartman, Mr. David Kratochvil, and Mr. Jacob Weiss have agreed to step down following the liquidation of China Cablecom's Hubei assets. "The Company appreciates the contributions made by Mr. Hartman, Mr. Kratochvil, and Mr. Weiss," says Pu Yue, chief executive officer of China Cablecom. "They have individually served the Board with invaluable and insightful guidance and we wish them the best in their future success."

=== C Ventures ===
Co-founded by entrepreneur Adrian Cheng and veteran investor Clive Ng in 2017, C Ventures is a global venture capital bridging the West and the East, curating a global cultural ecosystem targeting Millennials and the generation Z with a focus on disruptive businesses in technology, lifestyle and media. C Ventures has over 20 investments globally, including Moda Operandi, Bandier, DayDayCook, Dazed Media, Beautycon, Armarium, Threads Styling, Aibee, YOHO, GoLong, Gritworld, among others.

Ng currently serves as Vice Chairman of Dazed Media as well as Board Member of Bandier and Armarium.
