= Maple Pictures =

US film distribution company

Maple Pictures Corporation
- Type: Subsidiary
- Industry: Motion pictures
- Founded: April 13, 2005; 21 years ago
- Defunct: August 10, 2011; 15 years ago
- Fate: Sold to Alliance Films, and later folded into the same company's operations
- Headquarters: New York, USA
- Products: DVDs
- Owner: Lionsgate (2005–2011, minority stake)
- Parent: Alliance Films (2011–2013)
- Website: lionsgate.com/canada

Maple Pictures Corporation was a Canadian–American film distribution company founded on April 13, 2005, when Lionsgate demerged to two companies—Lions Gate Entertainment and Maple Pictures (formerly the original incarnation of Lionsgate Films). Maple Pictures was the official distributor for Lionsgate's films and video library throughout Canada.

Through several ownership changes, Alliance Films acquired Maple from Lionsgate in 2011, which was in turn sold to Entertainment One in 2013, which was itself acquired by Hasbro in 2019. Lionsgate, through its acquisition of eOne, reacquired the trademarks of Maple Pictures from Hasbro in 2023.

== Background ==
The company described itself as a "genre-savvy independent film company making a mark on the industry through its grassroots acquisition, production and distribution of diverse and distinctive filmed entertainment". Maple also had an extensive home video catalogue, which was built up largely by Lions Gate Entertainment's acquisition of several other independent studios. Their logo from 2005 depicted the company's name smothered in concentric circles & rings, whose font was set in Helvetica Bold.

Maple used to distribute LeapFrog and HIT Entertainment kids' DVDs.

In 2008, Maple Pictures acquired the rights to distribute Miramax films which Alliance Films lost acquisition to earlier in 2007.

On August 10, 2011, Alliance Films bought Maple Pictures from Lions Gate Entertainment (Maple's former owner) for a sum of 38.5 million dollars. On January 9, 2013, Entertainment One acquired Alliance, and then on December 30, 2019, American toy and media company Hasbro (after having tried and failed to acquire Lionsgate) acquired eOne. On August 3, 2023, Lionsgate announced that it would acquire the non-children's assets of eOne from Hasbro, reuniting the library and trademarks for Maple Pictures with Lionsgate after a separation of twelve years. The deal closed on December 27, 2023.

== Television DVD Releases ==
- Mad Men
- Weeds
- Nurse Jackie
- Crash
- Tyler Perry's House of Payne
- Saved by the Bell (Universal Television)
- Will & Grace (Universal Television)
- According to Jim (ABC Studios)
- Reaper (ABC Studios)
- My Wife & Kids (ABC Studios)
- ALF
- Teenage Mutant Ninja Turtles
- Dead Zone
- Saturday Night Live (Universal Television)
- Unsolved Mysteries
- Iron Chef

== Films released ==
- Dirty Dancing
- Basic Instinct
- Terminator 2: Judgment Day
- Bad Boys
- Reservoir Dogs
- Rambo
- The Eye
- Bug
- Leonard Cohen: I'm Your Man
- The Descent
- Death of a President
- Saw
- Saw II
- Saw III
- Saw IV
- Saw V
- Saw VI
- March of the Penguins
- Employee of the Month
- The U.S. Versus John Lennon
- House of 1000 Corpses
- The Descent
- The Devil's Rejects
- Leonard Cohen: I'm Your Man
- Crank
- Employee of the Month
- Good Luck Chuck
- The U.S. Versus John Lennon
- See No Evil
- The Mistress of Spices
- Dreamland
- Natural Born Killers
- 3:10 to Yuma
- Crash
- W.
- Atlas Shrugged
- The Bank Job
- Punisher: War Zone
- Young People Fucking
- The Forbidden Kingdom
- Meet The Browns
- Doubt
- Transporter 3
- Happy-Go-Lucky
- The Boy in the Striped Pajamas
- The Spirit
- Choke
- Repo! The Genetic Opera
- My Best Friend's Girl
- Bangkok Dangerous
- Hulk Vs
- The Lucky Ones
- The Boondock Saints II: All Saints Day
- My Bloody Valentine 3D
- Adventureland
- Pontypool
- Crank: High Voltage
- The Haunting in Connecticut
- Hunger
- Gamer
- The Imaginarium of Doctor Parnassus
- Whatever Works
- Kick-Ass
- The Switch
- The Expendables
- Saw 3D
- The Con Artist
- Burke and Hare
- Buried
- Hard Candy
