= Alliance Films =

Canadian film production and distribution company

Alliance Films Holdings, Inc.
- Logo used from 2012 to 2013
- Formerly: Alliance Entertainment Corporation (1984–1991); Alliance Communications Corporation (1991–1998); Alliance Atlantis Releasing Limited (1998–2003); Movie Distribution Income Fund (2003–2007)
- Type: Subsidiary
- Traded as: TSE: AEC (until 1991); TSE: ACC (1991–1998); Nasdaq: ACC (until 1998); TSX: FLM (2003-2007)
- Industry: Distribution and production
- Founded: 1984; 42 years ago (original); 2008; 18 years ago (relaunch)
- Founders: Stephen Roth; Denis Héroux; John Kemeny; Robert Lantos; Andras Hamori; Susan Cavan
- Defunct: 1998; 28 years ago (original); 2013; 13 years ago (relaunch)
- Fate: Merged with Atlantis Communications to form Alliance Atlantis (original); Acquired by and folded into Entertainment One (relaunch)
- Successor: Alliance Atlantis (original); Entertainment One (relaunch); Serendipity Point Films (original and relaunch; select head Robert Lantos)
- Headquarters: Montreal, Quebec, Canada
- Products: Film distribution; home video
- Revenue: ▲$250 million CAD
- Number of employees: 450 (2013)
- Subsidiaries: Maple Pictures; Momentum Pictures; Aurum Producciones
- Website: alliancefilms.com (archived 2013)

Alliance Films Holdings, Inc. (formerly Alliance Entertainment, Alliance Communications, Alliance Atlantis Releasing Ltd, and Motion Picture Distribution LP; also known as Alliance Vivafilm in Quebec or simply Alliance) was a Canadian motion picture distribution and production company.

Founded in 1984, Alliance was one of the major motion picture companies to distribute independent films outside the United States and other countries, and had also served the United Kingdom and Spain.

== History ==
=== Origins (1972–1984) ===
The company made its origins in 1972 when Robert Lantos formed Vivafilm. Two years later, Lantos teamed up with Stephen J. Roth to start out RSL Films (later RSL Entertainment Corporation) in 1975.

Another company, the International Cinema Corporation was originally formed in 1971 by three National Film Board of Canada executives John Kemeny, as well as Don Duprey, Joe Koenig and George Kaczender to develop documentaries, and it became International Cinema Corporation in 1979 when Kemeny teamed up with Denis Heroux to produce feature films.

=== Major history (1984–1998) ===
The company was formed in 1984 by Stephen Roth, Denis Héroux, John Kemeny, Robert Lantos, Andras Hamori and Susan Cavan as Alliance Entertainment, from a merger of RSL Entertainment Corporation and International Cinema Corporation, with financing from New Century Entertainment's SLM Productions and gave them a $10 million fund.

In 1986, the company had completed the first six projects in the first twelve months, and the company's fare was to be shown on the Big Three networks, namely ABC, CBS and NBC, as well as cable channel HBO and Canadian channel CTV, as well as a financing agreement with New Century/SLM Productions. One of Alliance's well known TV projects was Night Heat, and had to develop several television miniseries.

On September 11, 1986, Alliance Entertainment Corporation expanded into a package of seven feature films and television projects for the next twelve months, and John Hirsch made his television acting debut on Alliance's made-for-television movie production, The Sword of Gideon, which aired on CTV and HBO.

In 1987, it attempted to take over the Los Angeles-based production company Robert Cooper Productions, a move that will join the two companies under the Alliance banner, and bring 28 hours of programming donated by Robert Cooper to Alliance, which included HBO projects and several other television films, and distribution of the four Cooper/Alliance joint production ventures would be handled by Carolco Pictures outside of the Canadian market and handled through a $40 million limited partnership with Richard Greenshields of Canada Ltd., which is expected to file within two weeks. The aborted plan for an Alliance/Robert Cooper merger was later scrapped in October 1987. In late November 1987, after an aborted merger attempt between Alliance and Robert Cooper, which end up collaborating on the Return of Ben Casey telefilm, Alliance Entertainment had named Susan Cavan, who was formerly an in-house lawyer to serve as the studio's president, who succeeded Stephen Roth, who was one of the Alliance co-founders, which was ankled to become an industry consultant of the studio.

It acquired a Montreal-based Francophone distribution company, Vivafilm, in 1990, after Lantos bought out the company back from Loewy, renaming it to Alliance-Vivafilm in the process. In 1993, the company expanded its operations to launch its sales arm, Le Monde Entertainment.

In 1995, the company entered the broadcasting business, by first launching Showcase, then launching History Television. In 1997, the company had bought out several assets of Norstar Entertainment, including its title library for $5-10 million.

In February 1997, Alliance Communications announced that they would enter the UK film market by forming a joint-venture with British independent distributor Electric Pictures called Alliance Releasing UK.

In November 1997, Alliance Communications expanded into American television production by acquiring Los Angeles-based American television production company Citadel Entertainment from Time Warner (now Warner Bros. Discovery) owned Home Box Office and Anglia Television owner United Broadcasting & Entertainment after the two decided not to renew their joint venture Citadel Entertainment production company, giving Alliance an American production subsidiary with Citadel CEO David Ginsburg continued to lead the acquired company.

In 1998, it merged with Atlantis Communications, forming Alliance Atlantis Communications.

=== Alliance Atlantis (1998-2007) ===
In September 2003, Alliance Atlantis announced that they would spin-off the theatrical division, Alliance Atlantis Cinemas and UK subsidiary Momentum Pictures as an income fund business entitled Motion Picture Distribution LP. AAL would retain a 51% stake while the other 49% would be held by the Movie Distribution Income Fund. The business would also continue to use the Alliance Atlantis brand. The spin-off would officially close a month later in October.

During this period, films released under the venture contained a disclaimer stating that Alliance Atlantis was "an indirect limited partner of Motion Picture Distribution LP, not a general partner". However, in fact, the company controlled the general partner of the partnership, and hence effectively controlled the distribution unit itself.

In October 2006, Alliance Atlantis Communications put their 51% stake in the business up for sale.

=== Later years (2007–2013) ===
When Alliance Atlantis collapsed in 2007, the company was entirely split up into units. Motion Picture Distribution Partnership was entirely purchased out by EdgeStone Capital Partners and Goldman Sachs Alternatives. and shortly afterward, the company was relaunched as Alliance Films.

Alliance Films was headquartered in Montreal, Quebec, in the Quartier International.

In the mid-2000s, Alliance Films began to produce films in moderation. In addition to producing films as The Rocket (Maurice Richard) with Cinémaginaire (as well as other movies), National Lampoon's Senior Trip with New Line Cinema and Munich with Universal Pictures, DreamWorks SKG and Amblin Entertainment of and before the days of Alliance Atlantis respectively, they were responsible for co-producing the 2008 teen slasher Prom Night with Screen Gems and Original Film. They also produced and distributed the war drama Passchendaele, and co-produced the comedy Stone of Destiny with Infinity Features Entertainment and The Mob Film Company. They are also responsible for co-producing the 2011 horror film Insidious with FilmDistrict and Wanderlust with Universal Pictures and Apatow Productions.

In 2010, Alliance Films expanded its home video operations with an aggressive push into the TV-on-DVD market. It began releasing various television series on DVD, the majority are Canadian productions or Canadian co-productions. To date they have released over 20 series and continue to release more.

On June 24, 2011, Alliance Films bought Maple Pictures from Lionsgate for a total of $38.5 million before Alliance was folded into Entertainment One in early 2013.

Since early 2010, Alliance Films has been partnering with Jason Blum and his Blumhouse Productions company to produce low budget horror films. This began with Insidious which was released in 2011. The next to be released was Sinister in 2012 and Dark Skies in 2013. Since the 2013 acquisition and absorption, it is unclear if eOne will be a partner on subsequent Blumhouse films and their sequels.

On January 3, 2012, it was announced that Goldman Sachs Group is looking to sell its majority stake in Alliance Films.

=== Acquisition by eOne ===
On May 28, 2012, Entertainment One (eOne) confirmed their bid to purchase Alliance Films from Goldman Sachs Group, similar to the purchase of Maple Pictures a year prior. The acquisition was completed on January 9, 2013; upon the closure of the deal, Victor Loewy stepped down as CEO of the company. eOne also announced that it would phase out the Alliance brand entirely, in favour of solely operating under the eOne banner (Les Films Séville banner in Quebec).

In the years since its dissolution, Alliance Films' library (via eOne) would be split between Hasbro and Lionsgate (another Canadian-founded studio). Hasbro would acquire the eOne's Kids and Family brands in 2019, while Lionsgate would acquire the studio's remaining entertainment assets (also including Maple Pictures' trademarks) on December 27, 2023.

== Distribution ==
Alliance Films has distributed all or some of the following companies' films before the eOne acquisition and eOne's subsequent purchase by Lionsgate.

All listings are from the start of their deal with Alliance up to their current state with eOne:

- Apparition (2009–2010)
- Artisan Entertainment (1998–2004)
- CBS Films (2010–2019)
- Destination Films (1999–2001)
- FilmDistrict (2011–2013)
- Focus Features (2002–2016) (division of Comcast)
- Freestyle Releasing (2006–2012)
- Lionsgate Films (2011–present)
  (distributed by Maple Pictures from 2004 to 2011)
- Open Road Films (2014–present)
  (some titles released by VVS Films or Elevation Pictures)
- Miramax (1994–2008, 2011–2020) (former division of Disney, currently owned by Paramount Skydance Corporation (49%))
  (distributed by Maple Pictures from 2008 to 2010)
  - Dimension Films (1995–2005)
- New Line Cinema (1989–2010) (division of Warner Bros. Discovery)
- Orion Pictures (1993–1996)
- Overture Films (2008–2010)
- Relativity Media (2011–present)
  - Rogue Pictures (2005–2013)
- The Weinstein Company (2005–2018)
  - Dimension Films (2005–2018)

For more, see Entertainment One.

And also, Alliance Films' video releases from 2007 to 2013 were distributed by Universal Pictures Home Entertainment, until the acquisition by Entertainment One, and subsequent acquisition by Lionsgate ten years later, after which Lionsgate Home Entertainment and Sony Pictures Home Entertainment took over these home media distribution rights.

== Divisions ==
- Alliance Vivafilm: Francophone film business that produces and distributes feature films in Quebec, folded into Les Films Séville in 2014 after eOne acquired this company.
- Alliance Home Entertainment: Home entertainment division that releases feature films and TV series on DVD.

Alliance Films also operates the following international subsidiaries:

- Momentum Pictures (United Kingdom)
- Aurum Producciones (Spain)

== TV series ==
The following is a list of TV series that have been released on DVD by Alliance Films:

=== Animated ===
- Beast Wars: Transformers
- ReBoot
- Little Bear

=== Live-action (with various genres) ===
- Adventure Inc.
- Amazon
- Andromeda
- The Adventures of Sinbad
- The Adventures of the Black Stallion
- BeastMaster
- Bordertown
- The Crow: Stairway to Heaven
- Dead Man's Gun
- Degrassi: The Next Generation (youth)
- Earth: Final Conflict
- Emily of New Moon (youth)
- First Wave
- F/X: The Series
- Les Invincibles
- The Hitchhiker
- The Hunger
- Lexx
- Mutant X
- Mysterious Island
- NightMan
- Ned's Declassified School Survival Guide (youth)
- Once a Thief
- The Outer Limits
- Psi Factor: Chronicles of the Paranormal
- The Ray Bradbury Theater
- Relic Hunter
- Rent-a-Goalie
- RoboCop: The Series
- Starhunter
- TekWar
- Total Recall 2070
- Trailer Park Boys
- White Fang
- Zoey 101 (youth)

=== Canadian distribution ===
Alliance Films was the official Canadian distributor for the following series:

- CSI: Crime Scene Investigation
- CSI: Miami
- CSI: NY
- Clerks: The Animated Series
- Leverage (S1–3)
