= Laugh Out Loud Productions =

American production company

Laugh Out Loud Productions, LLC
- Industry: Entertainment
- Genre: Comedy
- Founded: 2017
- Founder: Kevin Hart
- Headquarters: Los Angeles, CA
- Website: laughoutloud.com

Laugh Out Loud Productions, LLC is an American production company and digital comedy network founded by comedian Kevin Hart. Founded in 2017, Laugh Out Loud (LOL) operates four divisions: LOL Network, LOL Studios, LOL Audio, and LOL X!, which produce, develop, and distribute digital, audio, and experiential comedic content. LOL is headquartered in Encino, CA, and has a full-service production studio in Canoga Park, California.

Since 2017, the company has evolved from an on-demand streaming service to a broader entertainment company. LOL's offerings encompass multiple comedy formats, including stand-up performances, scripted and unscripted video content, social media programming, radio, podcasting, and live events. LOL Network has distribution partnerships with Plex, PlutoTV, Peacock, Roku, Snap, Xumo, and YouTube, and LOL Studios has produced content for Quibi, Peacock, and Katz Networks (BounceTV).

== Company history ==
In 2017, in partnership with Lionsgate, Kevin Hart launched Laugh Out Loud as a subscription comedy streaming service. The network launched with seven original programs featuring comedians, including Hart, GloZell, King Bach, Dormtainment, and David So. In early 2019, Hart purchased most of Lionsgate's stake in the company to become the majority owner. The company's executive team includes Founder and Chairman Kevin Hart, CEO Jeff Clanagan, and President and COO Thai Randolph.

In 2018 LOL signed its first major distribution partnership with Bell Media to launch its content on Canada's Snackable TV.

In January 2020, LOL signed a multi-year deal with NBCUniversal Media, making LOL a flagship partner for Peacock TV, a video-on-demand streaming service that launched in July 2020. The partnership included an equity stake in LOL, a “first-look” agreement, distribution rights to the network's catalog, a Kevin Hart comedy special, exclusive short-form content, and the “Hart to Heart” interview series.

In February 2020, LOL debuted on the newly launched Pluto TV, featuring the stand-up show “Comedy in Color” and D.L. Hughley show, “Hughley Uncut.” LOL's “Comedy in Color” programming focuses on diversity and includes 300 comedians from over 30 countries. Pluto users have access to a curated selection of Laugh Out Loud's content, including Cold as Balls, Kevin Hart: Lyft Legend, and Black Geo. In September 2020, Simon & Schuster and LOL Audio released an audio series containing live recordings from “Comedy in Color,” hosted by Lil Rel. Through their “Comedy in Color” programming, LOL provides opportunities for emerging comedic talent to help comedians of all ethnicities, colors, and genders.

LOL launched its experiential division, LOL X! in early 2020, to produce comedy showcases, tours, and other experiential comedy events, such as live tapings. The division led marketing initiatives for Nick Cannon’s Wild N’ Out tour in partnership with ViacomCBS. In March, the division partnered with Advertising Week to launch a B2B podcast focused on comedy and culture, a new LOL-branded content studio, and LOL comedian appearances at company events, and in September, they partnered with Just for Laughs for their 2020 virtual comedy festival.

In June 2020, LOL joined forces with Wheelhouse Entertainment to develop, produce and distribute unscripted programming to showcase new comedy voices.

In July 2020, LOL Studios released the television series Die Hart on Quibi, which starred Hart and John Travolta. The show was renewed for a second season to be called Die Harter in September. Quibi previously partnered with LOL for the show Action Scene, which starred Hart as a fictionalized version of himself.

In September 2020, LOL Audio extended its agreement with SiriusXM to produce multi-platform comedic programming for the broadcasting company. According to the deal's terms, Hart will host regular and live programs on his channel, Laugh Out Loud Radio, and expand comedic programming with radio shows, podcasts, and on-demand videos. LOL's Straight from the Hart talk show, co-hosted by Hart and the Plastic Cup Boyz, debuted on Pandora, a Sirius subsidiary, in 2019 and was the number one podcast on Pandora radio that year.

== Partnerships ==
Laugh Out Loud has co-developed branded content, including Kevin Hart: Lyft Legend with Lyft Entertainment. Following a successful first season with over 50 million views, the series expanded to twelve episodes over two seasons. Cold as Balls, sponsored by Old Spice on YouTube, showcases Hart interviewing sports figures, including Russell Wilson, Reggie Bush, and Dennis Rodman, from an ice bath post-game. The show premiered its fourth season on November 12, 2020.

In March 2020, LOL renewed the fitness series Kevin Hart: What the Fit, produced in partnership with Bengay, for a third season on YouTube. As of October 2020, the series had over 435 million YouTube views. What the Fit features a humorous take on fitness, showcasing Hart, a fitness buff, and other comedians, actors, and celebrities, such as Tiffany Haddish, Conan O'Brien, and Terry Crews.

In October 2020, Laugh Out Loud partnered with Snapchat, where it will debut the new motivational show, Coach Kev, in which Hart will serve as a coach, mentor, and friend, sharing insight into living one's "best life."

== Awards ==
Cold as Balls, Lyft Legend, and Kevin Hart: What the Fit have won numerous accolades, including nominations and awards from the Producer's Guild, Critic Choice Awards, Realscreen, Streamy, and Webby awards.
