= Celestial Pictures =

Hong Kong media production company

Celestial Pictures Limited
- Industry: Entertainment
- Founded: 2000; 26 years ago
- Headquarters: Hong Kong, Hong Kong
- Owner: Astro Overseas Limited
- Subsidiaries: Celestial Tiger Entertainment (JV)
- Website: www.celestialpictures.com

Celestial Pictures is an entertainment-based company focused on Asian-language film and content, encompassing production's, aggregation, distribution, and TV channels. It is headquartered in Hong Kong and owned by Astro Overseas Limited.

Celestial Pictures owns the Shaw Brothers Film Library, which is one of the world's largest collections of Chinese film. The library comprises over 760 feature films, including The Five Venoms, Hex, The 36th Chamber of Shaolin, One-Armed Swordsman, King Boxer, and The Flying Guillotine. These films have been digitally restored for global distribution.

== History ==
The company purchased the Shaw Brothers film library in 2000 when it was then called "East Asia Filmed Entertainment Ltd" and owned by the Malaysian media group Astro Holdings Sdn Bhd. Astro Holdings were in turn controlled by Usaha Tegas Sdn. Bhd., a Malaysian investment holding company.

In 2001, under the Chinese name 星藝映畫, the company produced two films: Comic King (漫畫風雲) and Stowaway (驚天大逃亡). It took up the current Chinese name 天映娛樂 in 2002.

Celestial's television channel operations include Celestial Movies, Celestial Classic Movies, and WATA, a Chinese infotainment channel. Additionally, Shaw Bros. movies distributed by Celestial are shown in America on El Rey Network as part of its "Flying Five Finger One Armed Eight Pole Shaolin Exploding Death Touch Tuesdays" block.
