= Kix (Asian TV channel) =

- Country: China
- Broadcast area: Africa; Hong Kong; Indonesia; Philippines; Thailand; Vietnam
- Headquarters: Hong Kong

Programming
- Languages: English; Chinese (Mandarin/Cantonese); Indonesian; Malay; Thai; Filipino; Vietnamese
- Picture format: HDTV 1080i

Ownership
- Owner: Celestial Tiger Entertainment
- Sister channels: Celestial Classic Movies; Celestial Movies; CM+ Thrill

History
- Launched: 1 August 2009; 16 years ago (Southeast Asia); 1 October 2020; 5 years ago (Africa)
- Closed: 1 July 2022; 3 years ago (Malaysia); 1 May 2024; 21 months ago (Singapore)
- Replaced by: PRIMEtime (Astro channel space, Malaysia)

Links
- Website: kix-tv.com

Availability

Terrestrial
- DStv (Sub-Saharan Africa): Channel 114 (HD)
- SkyCable Metro Manila: Channel 63 (SD); Channel 242 (HD)
- Cignal TV Nationwide: Channel 230 (HD)
- SatLite Nationwide: Channel 51 (SD)

KIX is a Southeast Asian pay television channel owned by Celestial Tiger Entertainment. Its programming is targeted towards 18- to 45-year-old adults. The channel airs a combination of Asian content (notably Korean shows) with Western programs and attracts a core target audience of international viewers skewed toward male viewers.

== Programming blocks ==
The network has acquired licenses to mixed martial arts tournaments and international content including Bellator MMA, Mad Dogs, Top Gear Korea, Special Affairs Team TEN, and Quiz of God. In 2012, KIX secured first and exclusive rights to bring the Lingerie Football League, "America's fastest growing sports league", to Asia in a multi-year broadcast partnership deal.

=== Combat sports ===
A pillar of MMA combat and fight related tournaments that typically premiere Mondays and Tuesdays at 10 PM (GMT+8), 9 PM (GMT+7) and Saturdays at 7 PM (GMT+8) 6 PM (GMT+7). Programs airing in this block include BAMMA, Bellator MMA, Road FC, Kunlun Fight, Enfusion, SFL, Australian FC, Glory World Series, M-1 Challenge, Pacific Xtreme Combat and Rizin FF.

=== Action reality ===
Unscripted series and non-combat sporting events from the reality genre. Programs airing in this block include Lingerie Football League, Top Gear Korea, Top Gear USA, Top Gear Australia, Car Matchmaker, Car Crash, Heroes and Superstars, Infinite Challenge, The Incredible Mr Goodwin, Steve Austin's Broken Skull Challenge', Tornado Hunters, Drive, The Next Great Burger, The Ultimate Brocation, The Dude Perfect Show, Fifth Gear, Extreme Ends, Australian Ninja Warrior, G Wars, The Great Escape, What Went Down, Hunted, XRC, Britain's Hardest, Alternate Route, WeekEnd Fix, Illusions of Grandeur, Escape, Trigger Happy, Crazy Wheels and Travel Man.

=== Action series ===
Television series and international drama firmly rooted in the action adventure genre. Programs airing in this block include Special Affairs Team TEN, Quiz From God, SAF3, Mad Dogs, Fleming: The Man Who Would Be Bond, Girl Killer K, and Cheo Yong.

Selected series are available in DEGUP via Unifi TV in Malaysia.

=== Action movies ===
Action blockbuster films from Asia, Hollywood, and beyond with premiere features airing regularly Wednesdays at 10 PM (GMT+8), 9 PM (GMT+7), and Saturdays at 9 PM (GMT+8), 8 PM (GMT+7). Programs airing in this block include First Blood, Rocky, A Millionaire on the Run, New Police Story, The Mechanic, and Drive Angry.

Selected movies are available on Film Wallet, DEGUP via Unifi TV, Showcase Movies via Astro in Malaysia.

=== Lupe Fiasco's Beat N Path ===
In March 2018, American rapper Lupe Fiasco premiered a three-part television documentary called Beat N Path where he embarked on a journey around China to follow his passion for martial arts. This documentary is a tribute to his late father who was a grand master and ran a martial arts school in Chicago.

=== Asian Dynamite ===
Programs that feature Asian entertainment shows premiering every Tuesday and Wednesday at 9 PM (GMT+8), 8 PM (GMT+7). Programs airing on this block include Infinite Challenge, 2020 Idol Star Athletics Championships, G Wars and Totally Outnumbered.
