= Thrill (TV channel) =

Southeast Asian pay TV channel

- Broadcast area: Philippines; Indonesia; Hong Kong; Myanmar; Macau; Malaysia; Thailand

Programming
- Languages: English; Cantonese; Thai; Filipino; Bahasa Indonesia; Vietnamese
- Picture format: 1080i HDTV (downscaled to 16:9 480i SDTV for the main channel)

Ownership
- Owner: Celestial Tiger Entertainment
- Sister channels: Celestial Movies; Celestial Classic Movies; CM+ KIX

History
- Launched: 28 April 2010; 1 October 2024 (Tonton, Malaysia)
- Closed: February 1, 2023 (Singapore)

Links
- Website: thrill-tv.com

Availability

Terrestrial
- SkyCable Metro Manila: Channel 107
- Cignal TV Nationwide: Channel 51
- SatLite Nationwide: Channel 71

Thrill is a Southeast Asian pay television channel focusing on the horror, thriller, suspense and supernatural fiction genres. It primarily airs imports from the United States, the United Kingdom, Australia, and Asia.

== Programming ==
The channel airs many iconic horror film franchises including The Ring, Ju-on, The Amityville Horror, Friday the 13th, and The Blair Witch Project. Each month, a thematic block composed of first airings from contemporary and classic horror films is aired typically on Fridays at 11 PM (HK/SG/PHIL), 10 PM (JKT/THAI).

Thrill airs South Korean imports in partnership with South Korea's OCN channel; these include Vampire Prosecutor, The Virus and Cheo Yong The Paranormal Detective. Other programming Western dramas such as Psychoville, Coma, Bedlam and Holliston and paranormal reality series such as Ghost Hunters and Most Haunted.

Thrill recently created and aired its original productions; Model Family which is premiered on October 31, 2020 as its first and 3 AM, a 5-part miniseries as its second original production on October 3, 2022.

Thrill's selected movies and TV series are also available on Astro via On Demand (ended on January 1, 2022, but Now, Selected Titles Also on ShowCase Movies on Astro), Film Wallet (in "KIX" brand, movies only) and DEGUP via Unifi TV in Malaysia.

Unlike other film-oriented channels which tend to be commercial-free, Thrill airs television advertising.

== Programming blocks ==
=== Thrill of the Week ===
Thrill of the Week features horror films across Asia and America. Airs every Monday at 9 PM (HK/SIN)/8 PM (JKT/BKK).

=== Asian Horror ===
Asian Horror airs only horror films originated in Asia. (mostly films from China, Philippines, Indonesia, etc.) Airs every Wednesday at 9 PM (HK/SIN)/8 PM (JKT/BKK).
