= Celestial Movies =

Asian movie channel

- Country: China; Malaysia
- Broadcast area: Singapore (CM+); Malaysia; Indonesia; Philippines (Celestial Movies Pinoy); China; Taiwan; Japan; Korea; Brunei

Programming
- Languages: English (Indonesia); Mandarin (Singapore); Cantonese (Malaysia); Japanese; Korean; Thai; Vietnamese; Indonesian; Malay; Filipino
- Picture format: 720p (HDTV)

History
- Launched: 3 March 2003
- Closed: 1 August 2012 (Vietnam); 1 July 2014 (Hong Kong)

Links
- Website: celestialmovies.com

Availability

Terrestrial
- Astro (Malaysia): Channel 309 (HD)
- Singtel TV (Singapore): Channel 585 (HD)
- Starhub TV (Singapore): Channel 868 (HD)
- BTV (Korea): Channel 88
- VCTV (Vietnam): Channel 9 (Analog)
- True Visions (Thailand): Channel 233
- Transvision (Indonesia): Channel 108 (HD)

Celestial Movies (天映频道) is an Asian 24-hour Chinese movie channel, which screens films from and shows interviews with movie stars and directors, entertainment news and film award ceremonies. The channel is available in 11 territories across Asia Pacific, including Mainland China, Hong Kong, Malaysia, Philippines, Singapore, Indonesia, Thailand, Vietnam and other countries in Asia.

Due to an agreement between Celestial Tiger Entertainment and Astro Holding Sdn Bhd, the channel didn't appear on other TV providers in Malaysia until 1 October 2021, when the channel launched in Unifi TV on channel 288 as a replacement for Star Chinese Movies due to Disney's pay TV closure.

== Movie line-up ==
The channel features Chinese movies from regional film studios such as Media Asia, Emperor Motion Pictures, Filmko Pictures, Orange Sky Golden Harvest, CJ Entertainment and Toho.

== Scheduling ==
On weeknights, movies are scheduled by genres: namely Drama Monday, Action Tuesday, Comedy Wednesday, Bromance Thursday and Fantasy Friday. During Saturday and Sunday nights, Celestial Movies showcases blockbusters and first-run movies.

Other programmes include news of movie and film-festival from around the globe, documentaries and shorts. Celestial also produces a number of original behind-the-scenes programmes such as: Celestial Cameos, Director To Director, Celestial Express and Star Talk.

== Sister channels ==
=== Celestial Classic Movies ===
Celestial Classic Movies (CCM) is a 24-hour pay-TV movie channel screening Chinese classic movies from the Shaw Brothers library and other film libraries. For best visual and sound quality, all Shaw Brothers movies are digitally restored to match the original cinematic prints.

=== Celestial Movies Pinoy (Philippines) ===
Celestial Tiger Entertainment has teamed with Viva Communications to create Celestial Movies Pinoy, a localized Philippines version of CTE’s Chinese film channel Celestial Movies. The channel was launched on January 1, 2016 on the basic tier of DTH satellite provider Cignal TV. Movies and on-air presentations are dubbed in a mixture of Tagalog and English. Their programming is a mix of Chinese-language movies and TV series, behind-the-scenes specials, interviews with Chinese talent and thematic programming centered around superstars or popular genres.

=== Celestial Movies Asia ===
Celestial Movies Asia (CMA) was a 24-hour pay-TV movie channel that featured movies from the Celestial Movies and Celestial Classic Movies channels in Asia. With a choice of more than 100 titles from Japan, Korea, Hong Kong, Mainland China, Taiwan, Thailand, and Singapore every month, CMA offered Asian cinema and premieres a variety of regional movies. Every Saturday night, CMA showcases Asian blockbusters of selected topics or genre. While on every Sunday night, CMA broadcasts the latest or even non-screened Asian movies exclusively in Celestial Sunday.

Celestial Movies Asia has since rebranded to Celestial Movies in Hong Kong since 15 February 2011.

=== CM+ ===
Singtel and Celestial Tiger Entertainment, the owner of the Celestial Movies network made a carrier deal to launch CM+ on 1 October 2021 at 1200 hrs SGT, officially replacing the former cHK channel and currently exclusive to Singapore, serves as alternative to the currently closed Star Chinese Movies due to Disney's pay TV closure.
