= List of foreign footballers in Vietnam =

This is a list of foreign football players in Vietnam.

The List includes players from 2000–01 to 2026–27. Players of the current season are also included. All following players have played at least one game in Vietnam.

- As for dual citizen, nationality is listed under official registration.
- Players in **bold** indicate players currently playing in the Vietnamese football league system. Flags represent the player's country of birth, in case it is different from his main nationality.
- National flag before the name: players who have represented their national football senior team in FIFA International Match and have at least one international appearance cap.

== Naturalized Vietnamese players ==
Vietnamese name	Original name	Original nationality
Đỗ Merlo	Gastón Merlo	Argentina
Lò Martin	Martin Lo	Australia
Ngô Đăng Khoa	Khoa Ngo	Australia
Đinh Văn Ta	Rodrigo Mota Farias	Brazil
Đỗ Hoàng Hên	Hêndrio Araújo da Silva	Brazil
Đỗ Phi Long	Gustavo Sant'Ana Santos	Brazil
Đoàn Marcelo	Marcelo Barbieri	Brazil
Huỳnh Kesley Alves	Kesley Alves	Brazil
Nguyễn Hoàng Hélio	Hélio da Silva Assis	Brazil
Nguyễn Rogerio	Rogerio Machado Pereira	Brazil
Nguyễn Tài Lộc	Geovane Magno	Brazil
Nguyễn Trung Sơn	Marcos Jefferson Farias Valentim	Brazil
Nguyễn Xuân Son	Rafaelson Bezerra Fernandes	Brazil
Phan Văn Santos	Fábio dos Santos	Brazil
Trường An	Thiago Papel	Brazil
Lê Hoàng Phát Thierry	Thierry Ngale Jiemon	Cameroon
Nguyễn Hằng Tcheuko Minh	Benoît Tcheuko Elmakoua	Cameroon
Nguyễn Filip	Filip Nguyen	Czech Republic
Lê Minh Tshamala	Tshamala Kabanga	DR Congo
Williams Minh Hoàng	Lee Williams	England
Cao Pendant Quang Vinh	Jason Pendant	France
Casset Ludovic	Ludovic Casset	France
Nguyễn Adou Leygley Minh	Leygley Adou	France
Bùi Đức Duy	Adriano Schmidt	Germany
Lê Văn Phú	Issifu Ansah	Ghana
Lê Văn Tân	Jonathan Quartey	Ghana
Nguyễn van Bakel	Danny van Bakel	Netherlands
Đặng Amaobi	Honest Uzowuru Amaobi	Nigeria
Đinh Hoàng Max	Maxwell Eyerakpo	Nigeria
Hoàng Vissai	Dio Preye	Nigeria
Hoàng Vũ Samson	Samson Kayode Olaleye	Nigeria
Nguyễn Quốc Thiện Esele	Theophilus Esele	Nigeria
Nguyễn Trung Đại Dương	Suleiman Oladoja Abdullahi	Nigeria
Olaha Mạnh Đức	Michael Olaha	Nigeria
Lê Khắc Viktor	Viktor Le	Russia
Đặng Văn Việt	Robert Dang Van	Slovakia
Lê Giang Patrik	Patrik Le Giang	Slovakia
Đoàn Văn Nirut	Nirut Surasiang	Thailand
Đoàn Văn Sakda	Sakda Joemdee	Thailand
Lý Lâm Wa	Issawa Singthong	Thailand
Nguyễn Rodgers	Wandwasi Rodgers	Uganda
Phan Lê Isaac	Isaac Kamu Mylyanga	Uganda
Trần Lê Martin	Ronald Martin Katsigazi	Uganda
Trần Trung Hiếu Kizito	Geoffrey Kizito	Uganda
Đinh Hoàng La	Mykola Lytovka	Ukraine
Đặng Thanh Hoàng	Steven Dang	United States
Lê Trung Vinh	Vinh Le	United States
Lương Chí Khải	Kyle Colonna	United States
Nguyễn Thế Anh	Lee Nguyen	United States
Nguyễn Văn Thắng	Danny Reid	United States
Lê Tostao	Fungai Tostao Kwashi	Zimbabwe

== Angola ==
- **Aldaír Ferreira** - Cong An Ho Chi Minh City - 2026-
- (Angola) Eldon Maquemba - Long An - 2010
- Pilolas - Khatoco Khanh Hoa - 2012

== Argentina ==
- Damián Andermatten – Hanoi ACB – 2005
- Cristian Badaracco – Ho Chi Minh City – 2010
- Miguel Ángel Basualdo – Huda Hue – 2010
- Cristian Román Benítez – Hanoi ACB – 2007
- Alexis Blanco – Huda Hue – 2014
- Ezequiel Brítez – SHB Da Nang – 2014
- Alexandre D.S. Campos – Hanoi ACB – 2009
- Lucas Cantoro – Hanoi FC, Hanoi T&T – 2011–2012
- Angel Cerqueira – Dong Tam Long An – 2001–2002
- Cesar Paolo Cocchi – SHB Da Nang, Tien Giang – 2009–2010
- Leonel Felice – Hanoi – 2012
- Alex Fernando – SHB Da Nang – 2005
- Mauricio Giganti – Hue – 2004
- Alejo Gelatini – Hanoi ACB – 2009–2011
- Rodrigo Nicolas Gómez – Tien Giang – 2008
- Nicolás Hernández – SHB Da Nang, Quang Nam – 2010–2013
- Alejandro Insaurralde – Tien Giang, Can Tho, Thanh Hoa, Hue – 2006–2011
- Sergio Insaurralde- Tien Giang – 2007–2008
- Agustin Ricardo Machado – SHB Da Nang – 2007
- Gonzalo Marronkle – Hanoi FC, Ho Chi Minh City – 2010–2018
- Diego Martin Mendez – Tay Ninh – 2010–2012
- Diego Fabian Molares – Can Tho, Binh Duong – 2007–2008
- Gaston Molina – SHB Da Nang, Binh Duong – 2008–2010
- Gaston Raul Moyano – Thanh Hoa – 2009
- Víctor Ormazábal – Hanoi FC, Ho Chi Minh City – 2015–2017
- Marcos Pirchio – Sanna Khanh Hoa – 2014
- **Joel López Pissano** – SHB Da Nang – 2026–
- Matías Recio – SHB Da Nang, Hanoi T&T – 2010–2011
- Victor Reva – Haiphong – 2010
- Fernando Daniel Rojas – The Cong – 2007
- Mario Romero – Can Tho – 2011
- Matias Gabriel Vicente – Saigon Port – 2008
- Matías Zbrun – SHB Da Nang – 2014

== Australia ==
- Robert Bajic – Song Lam Nghe An – 2009–2010
- Wade Baldwin – Da Nang – 2000–2001
- **Lawrence Caruso** – The Cong-Viettel – 2026–
- (Australia) **Jason Cummings** – Cong An Ho Chi Minh City – 2026–
- Sam Gallagher – Hanoi T&T – 2014
- James Christopher Johnson – Da Nang – 2000–2001
- Josh Maguire – Ho Chi Minh City – 2009
- Peter Makrillos – Cong An Ho Chi Minh City – 2025–2026
- **Stefan Mauk** – Cong An Hanoi – 2025–
- Rusell Miner – Da Nang – 2000–2001
- Nathan Moulds – Dong Thap – 2007
- Nicholas Olsen – Saigon, SHB Da Nang, Becamex Binh Duong – 2022–2023
- (Australia) **Adam Taggart** – Hanoi FC – 2026–
- Benjamin Van Meurs – Haiphong, Dong A Thanh Hoa – 2023–2024
- David Vrankovic – Becamex Binh Duong – 2015

== Austria ==
- Van-Alessandro Nguyen Skyriotis – Thep Xanh Nam Dinh – 2026–

== Belarus ==
- Serguei Tchursine – Nam Dinh – 2000–2001

== Belgium ==
- (Belgium) Marvin Ogunjimi - Saigon - 2018
- Elisha Sam – Becamex Ho Chi Minh City – 2026
- Jordy Soladio - Song Lam Nghe An - 2023
- **Lenn-Minh Tran** – Cong An Ho Chi Minh City – 2026–
- Ulilzwelimena Vedaste - Dong Nai - 2006

== Bosnia and Herzegovina ==
- (Bosnia and Herzegovina) Goran Brašnić – Song Lam Nghe An – 2010–2012
- Amar Ćatić – Dong A Thanh Hoa – 2026
- Neven Laštro – Than Quang Ninh – 2019–2020
- Rajko Vidović – Song Lam Nghe An – 2010–2012

== Botswana ==
- Brandon Wilson – SHB Da Nang, Hanoi FC – 2023–2024

== Brazil ==
- Wellington Adão
- Adriano
- **Adriel** – Hanoi FC – 2025–
- Agostinho – Hoang Anh Gia Lai, T&T Hanoi, Khatoco Khanh Hoa – 2007–2012
- Aylton Alemão
- Alex
- Jose Almeida – SHB Da Nang, Navibank Saigon, Quang Nam – 2006–2016
- **Lucas Alves** – Thep Xanh Nam Dinh, The Cong-Viettel – 2024–
- **Romário Alves** – Dong Thap, Long An – 2026–
- Amarildo – The Cong-Viettel, PVF-CAND – 2024–2025
- Ricardo Andrade – An Giang – 2005
- **Luiz Antônio** – Dong A Thanh Hoa, Haiphong, Hong Linh Ha Tinh – 2023–
- Marco Antônio – PVF-CAND – 2025
- Fabiano de Araujo – Haiphong – 2007–2008
- **Léo Artur** – Quy Nhon Binh Dinh, Cong An Hanoi - 2023-
- **Luann Augusto** – Hoang Anh Gia Lai – 2026–
- Pedro Augusto
- André Baracho – Hoa Phat Hanoi, Song Lam Nghe An – 2005–2007
- Neto Baiano – Binh Duong – 2004
- Jefferson Baiano – Hoang Anh Gia Lai – 2022
- David Bala – Becamex Binh Duong – 2011
- Andre Luíz Baracho
- Mauricio Barbosa – Hoang Anh Gia Lai – 2021
- Junior Barros
- Júnior Batista – Hoang Anh Gia Lai – 2026
- Cauê Benicio – Hanoi T&T – 2009–2011
- Jhonatan Bernardo
- Patrick Boni – SHB Da Nang – 2019
- Rogério Braga – Hoa Phat Hanoi – 2006
- **Júnior Brandão** – The Cong-Viettel – 2026–
- Thoni Brandão – Long An – 2026
- Washington Brandão – Hoang Anh Gia Lai – 2021–2023, 2025
- **Lucão do Break** – Hanoi FC, SHB Da Nang, Haiphong, The Cong-Viettel, Ninh Binh – 2022–
- Werick Caetano – SHB Da Nang – 2024
- Caion – Hanoi FC – 2023
- Caíque – Viettel – 2020–2022
- Gilson Campos – Long An – 2013–2014
- Bruno Cantanhede – Viettel, Hanoi FC, Dong A Thanh Hoa, Bac Ninh – 2019–2021, 2023–2024, 2026
- Jardel Capistrano
- Antônio Carlos – Saigon Port, Long An, Xuan Thanh Saigon, Haiphong – 2003–2013
- Mauro Carlos – Hoa Phat Hanoi – 2006
- Telmo Carmeiro – Long An – 2001–2002
- Victor De Carvalho – Dong Thap – 2006
- Cassiano – Hanoi T&T – 2007–2009
- Cassius
- **Caio César** – Thep Xanh Nam Dinh – 2024–
- **Júlio César** – Hoang Anh Gia Lai – 2026–
- China – Thep Xanh Nam Dinh, Cong An Hanoi – 2025–2026
- Claudecir – Quang Nam, Haiphong, Than Quang Ninh, Hong Linh Ha Tinh, SHB Da Nang – 2016–2021
- Claudir – SHB Da Nang – 2022
- Clayton – Ho Chi Minh City, Hanoi FC – 2009, 2011
- Jhon Cley – Cong An Hanoi, Hoang Anh Gia Lai, Dong Thap – 2023–2024, 2025–2026
- Gabriel Conceição – Hoang Anh Gia Lai – 2025–2026
- Conrado – Dong A Thanh Hoa, Quang Nam – 2023–2024
- Maurício Cordeiro
- Rogerio Correira – Hoa Phat Hanoi – 2005
- Bruno Cosendey
- Gilberto Costa – Dong Thap – 2000–2001
- Gustavo Santos Costa
- Douglas Coutinho
- Flavio Cruz – Hue, Binh Dinh, Navibank Saigon – 2004–2011
- Leandro Cruz – Navibank Saigon – 2010–2011
- Patrick Cruz – Saigon – 2017
- **Paulinho Curuá** – The Cong-Viettel – 2025–
- (Brazil) Denílson – Haiphong – 2009
- Dení Jr – Hanoi FC – 2023–2024
- Kayo Dias
- Rodrigo Dias
- Anderson Doreis – Dong Thap – 2000–2001
- **Daniel dos Anjos** – Ninh Binh, Becamex Ho Chi Minh City – 2025–
- Gustavo Dourado – Long An, Vissai Ninh Binh – 2007–2012
- João Pedro Duarte – The Cong-Viettel, Ho Chi Minh City – 2024, 2025
- Matheus Duarte
- Jeferson Elias – The Cong-Viettel, Cong An Hanoi, Hoang Anh Gia Lai – 2023–2025
- Eydison
- **Ezequiel** – Thep Xanh Nam Dinh – 2026–
- Alisson Farias – Quy Nhon Binh Dinh – 2024–2025
- Leonel Felice
- Matheus Felipe – Cong An Ho Chi Minh City – 2025–2026
- Marcelo Fernandes
- Luiz Fernando – Hanoi FC – 2025–2026
- Gabriel Ferreira
- Patryck Ferreira – Ho Chi Minh City FC – 2025
- Wesley Gomes Ferreira – Cong An Haiphong – 2000–2001
- Júnior Fialho – Cong An Hanoi – 2023–2024
- Alex Flávio – Saigon FC – 2022
- Luciano Fonseca – T&T Hanoi – 2010
- Diogo Pereira – Becamex Binh Duong, SHB Da Nang, Nam Dinh, Than Quang Ninh – 2017–2021
- Paulo Foiani – Hoa Phat Hanoi – 2008
- **Gonzalo Fornari** – Cong An Nhan Dan – 2026–
- Gilberto Fortunato
- Khevin Fraga – Hoang Anh Gia Lai – 2025
- Osmar Francisco
- Bernardo Frizoni
- Eduardo Furrier – Da Nang, Than Quang Ninh, Hoa Phat Hanoi, Khatoco Khanh Hoa – 2008–2012
- Diego Gama – The Cong – 2009
- Patrick Gama – The Cong-Viettel – 2025
- Lucas Gaúcho
- Gerry – Long An – 2011–2012
- Márcio Giovanini
- Claudio Gomes – Saigon Port – 2006
- Hugo Gomes – Cong An Hanoi – 2024–2026
- **Léo Gomes** – Cong An Ho Chi Minh City – 2026–
- Evaldo Goncalves – Hoang Anh Gia Lai – 2009–2013
- **Alan Grafite** – Quy Nhon Binh Dinh, Cong An Hanoi – 2023–
- Carlos Granaro – Binh Dinh – 2004
- João Guilherme – Becamex Binh Duong – 2023
- Hêdipo – Becamex Binh Duong, SHB Da Nang – 2019–2021
- **Helerson** – Hong Linh Ha Tinh – 2024–
- Bruno Henrique
- Luiz Henrique – Dong Nai, Can Tho – 2014, 2015
- Paulo Henrique
- Pedro Henrique – The Cong-Viettel – 2024–2026
- Gustavo Henrique – Cong An Hanoi, Ninh Binh – 2022–2023, 2025–2026
- William Henrique – Hanoi FC – 2023
- Hyuri – Quang Nam – 2024
- Jacó – Quang Nam – 2024
- William Jadot – Binh Dinh – 2003
- **Jairo** – Khanh Hoa, Hoang Anh Gia Lai, Song Lam Nghe An – 2022–
- Janclesio – Viettel, Hong Linh Ha Tinh, SHB Da Nang, Becamex Binh Duong, Ninh Binh – 2019–2026
- Elenildo de Jesus – Ho Chi Minh City, Haiphong, Becamex Binh Duong – 2006–2012
- Josivan – Long An, Da Nang – 2005–2006
- Jucélio – Hoa Phat Hanoi, Can Tho, Vissai Ninh Binh – 2005–2010
- Thiago Junio
- Arthur Junior – Long An – 2001–2003
- Dário Júnior – Ho Chi Minh City 2021
- Kainã – Bac Ninh – 2025–2026
- Cleiton Kanu
- Lázaro – Quan Khu 4, Haiphong, Long An – 2007–2012
- Laerte – Vissai Ninh Binh – 2010–2014
- Leandro – Haiphong, Becamex Binh Duong – 2007–2011
- Patrick Leonardo
- Robson de Lima – Becamex Binh Duong – 2007–2009
- Vanderlei Lima – The Cong, Thanh Hoa – 2009–2010
- Robson Lino – Long An, Binh Dinh, Quang Nam – 2001–2003, 2005–2007
- Brendon Lucas
- **Matheus Lucas** – Hoang Anh Gia Lai – 2026–
- Luciano – An Giang – 2012–2013
- Erick Luis – SHB Da Nang – 2022
- Jorge Luiz – Binh Dinh – 2008–2009
- **André Luiz** – Nam Dinh, The Cong-Viettel – 2023, 2026–
- Wander Luiz – Long An, Quang Nam, Can Tho, Becamex Binh Duong, Ho Chi Minh City – 2017–2019, 2024
- **Luizão** – Song Lam Nghe An – 2026–
- Dionatan Machado
- Paollo Madeira – Hong Linh Ha Tinh, Hoang Anh Gia Lai – 2022–2023
- Walisson Maia
- Yuri Mamute
- Willian Maranhão – Hanoi FC – 2025
- Marcão
- Patrick Marcelino – Ninh Binh – 2025–2026
- **Marciel** – Hoang Anh Gia Lai, Ninh Binh – 2024–
- Marcio
- **Brenner Marlos** – Thep Xanh Nam Dinh, Bac Ninh – 2024–
- Márcio Marques – Nam Dinh – 2022
- Felipe Martins
- **Matheus Martins** – Thanh Hoa – 2026–
- Ivan Mathias – Binh Duong – 2005
- Bruno Matos – Viettel – 2021
- Michel Meirelles – Saigon Port – 2006
- Ramon Mesquita – Than Quang Ninh – 2017
- Douglas Mineiro
- Gabriel Morbeck – Quy Nhon Binh Dinh – 2024
- Guilherme Rodrigues Moreira
- Henrique Motta - Hoang Anh Gia Lai - 2017
- Thiago Moura – Saigon – 2019
- **Wesley Natã** – The Cong-Viettel – 2024–
- (Brazil) Wellington Nem – Becamex Binh Duong – 2024
- Ruy Netto
- Nildo – Binh Dinh – 2008–2009
- Jackson Nogueira – Ho Chi Minh City, Kien Giang – 2009–2013
- Sandro Nogueira – Binh Dinh – 2003
- Denílson de Oliveira – Hoa Phat Hanoi – 2006
- Rafael Oliveira – The Cong, Navibank Saigon, Than Quang Ninh – 2009–2013
- Warley Oliveira – Quang Nam, Sanna Khanh Hoa – 2018–2019
- Miranda Oyarce – Haiphong – 2004
- Eder Pacheco – Tien Giang – 2006
- Antonio Padinha – Hoa Phat Hanoi – 2006–2007
- **Bruno Paraíba** – Song Lam Nghe An – 2026–
- Junior Paraiba – Hoang Anh Gia Lai – 2016
- **Daniel Passira** – Hanoi FC, Hong Linh Ha Tinh – 2025–
- Ernesto Paulo – Hoang Anh Gia Lai, Long An – 2012–2013
- João Paulo – Viettel – 2019
- João Paulo – Ho Chi Minh City – 2021–2022
- Pedro Paulo – Saigon, Viettel – 2019–2022
- Zé Paulo – Quang Nam, Thanh Hoa, Hong Linh Ha Tinh, Haiphong, Quy Nhon Binh Dinh – 2020–2023, 2024–2025
- Sandro Pedrosa – Song Lam Nghe An – 2004
- Diogo Pereira
- Tufy Pina – Hong Linh Ha Tinh – 2020
- Maurício Pinto
- Alex Rafael
- Bruno Ramires – Hong Linh Ha Tinh – 2023–2024
- Yago Ramos – Khanh Hoa, Quang Nam, Dong A Thanh Hoa, Xuan Thien Phu Tho – 2023–2026
- Marlon Rangel – Quy Nhon Binh Dinh, SHB Da Nang – 2023–2024
- **Robson Reis** – Hoang Anh Gia Lai – 2026–
- Ricardinho – Navibank Saigon – 2011–2012
- **Ribamar** – Dong A Thanh Hoa, SHB Da Nang, The Cong-Viettel – 2024–
- Éder Richartz
- Rincon – Saigon Port – 2006
- Leandro Fernanche Rios – Cong An Haiphong – 2000–2001
- Lucas Rocha – Quang Nam – 2019–2020
- Carlos Rodrigues – Long An – 2004–2006
- **Hernandes Rodrigues** – The Cong-Viettel – 2026–
- Cristiano Roland – Hanoi T&T – 2008, 2009–2013
- **Romeu** – Ninh Binh – 2026–
- **Rômulo** – Thep Xanh Nam Dinh – 2024–
- Roberto Rosano – Hanoi ACB – 2004
- Igor Salatiel – Dong A Thanh Hoa – 2024–2025
- Victor Sales – Ho Chi Minh City Youth – 2025–2026
- Alex Sandro – Truong Tuoi Dong Nai – 2025–2026
- Caíque Santos – Thep Xanh Nam Dinh – 2025–2026
- Douglas Santos – Hue – 2000–2001
- Francisco dos Santos – Hoa Phat Hanoi – 2005–2006
- Kleber Santos – Khatoco Khanh Hoa, Hoa Phat Hanoi – 2007–2010
- Marclei Santos
- **Rafael Santos** – Bac Ninh – 2026–
- Sanya Santos – Song Lam Nghe An – 2006
- Tales dos Santos
- Valdnei Dos Santos – Hoa Phat Hanoi, Song Lam Nghe An, T&T Hanoi – 2005–2009
- William Santos – Hoa Phat Hanoi, Khatoco Khanh Hoa – 2006–2009
- Cássio Scheid – SHB Da Nang – 2025
- Cledson Silva – Da Nang – 2004
- Diego Silva – Dong Thap, Haiphong – 2016, 2020–2021
- Gibson Da Silva – The Cong, Thanh Hoa – 2009–2012
- Lucas Silva – Thep Xanh Nam Dinh – 2024–2025
- Luis Carlos Da Silva – Da Nang – 2006
- Marcelo Da Silva
- Patrick da Silva – Thanh Hoa – 2015
- Robson Siveira – Dong Tam Long An – 2003
- Bruno de Souza – Dong Tam Long An, Binh Dinh – 2004–2008
- Emerson Souza – SHB Da Nang – 2025
- Rafael de Souza – Hoa Phat Hanoi – 2008
- Rodrigo Souza – XSKT Can Tho – 2010
- Douglas Tardin – Quang Nam, Khanh Hoa – 2018–2019, 2023
- Leandro Teófilo – Da Nang, Hoa Phat Hanoi – 2005, 2007
- **Tháileon** – Cong An Hanoi, Quy Nhon United, Cong An Nhan Dan, Thep Can Tho – 2025–
- Rodrigo Toledo – Binh Duong, Song Lam Nghe An, An Giang, Hoang Anh Gia Lai, Binh Dinh – 2006–2007, 2008–2010
- Martin Trindade – Tien Giang, Haiphong, Saigon Port, Navibank Saigon – 2005–2010
- Jesus Trindade – Becamex Binh Duong, Ho Chi Minh City – 2008–2009
- **Lucas Turci** – PVF-CAND, Ninh Binh – 2026–
- Raphael Utzig – Cong An Ho Chi Minh City – 2025–2026
- João Veras – Hoang Anh Gia Lai – 2024
- Dominic Vinicius
- Joel Vinícius
- Marcão Vinícius – Than Quang Ninh – 2017
- Marcus Vinicius
- **Vitão** – Cong An Hanoi, Bac Ninh – 2024–
- Wálber – Thep Xanh Nam Dinh – 2024–2026
- Wesley
- Welder – Hong Linh Ha Tinh – 2026
- Wilker
- Willians

== Burundi ==
- (Burundi) Alphonse Gatera
- (Burundi) Dugary Ndabashinze – Becamex Binh Duong, Saigon – 2017–2018
- (Burundi) Abdallah Nduwimana
- (Burundi) Hussein Mbanza Nzeyimana

== Bulgaria ==
- Radostin Nguyen

== Burkina Faso ==
- (Burkina Faso) Abdoul Abass Guiro – Becamex Binh Duong – 2022
- Elis Koulibaly
- (Burkina Faso) Ali Rabo – Becamex Binh Duong – 2018–2021
- (Burkina Faso) Valentin Zoungrana

== Cambodia ==
- (Cambodia) Ung Kanyanith – An Giang – 2003
- (Cambodia) Kao Nisai – An Giang – 2004
- (Cambodia) Tes Sean – Tay Ninh – 1975–1979

== Cameroon ==
- Din Akame
- Christian Nsi Amougou
- Guy Andela Atangana
- Emmanuel Ayuk – Hue – 2001–2003
- (Cameroon) Gustave Bebbe – Song Lam Nghe An – 2011–2012
- Didier Celestin Belibi
- Paul Emile Biyaga
- Hervé Din Din
- (Cameroon) **Félix Eboa Eboa** – Thep Xanh Nam Dinh – 2026–
- Alain Ekwe
- Arsène Elogo
- Francois Elokan
- François Endene
- Louis Epassi Ewonde
- Alain Eyenga – Quang Nam, PVF-CAND – 2024–2026
- (Cameroon) Anicet Eyenga – Haiphong – 2010
- Pascal Fofie
- Aimé Djicka Gassissou
- Mathias Malep – Becamex Binh Duong – 2025
- Malcolin Nzouatchoum Mbiakop
- Yves Mboussi
- Alain Njoh Njoh Mpondo
- Ulrich Munze
- Souleyman Nchouwat
- Edouard Ndjodo
- Thierry Ngaletiemon
- Simon Zelateur Ngoumou
- **Richmond Nji** – Xuan Thien Phu Tho – 2026–
- Marcelin Nkemia
- Albert Babou Noubi
- (Cameroon) Paul-Georges Ntep – Ho Chi Minh City – 2023–2024
- Aloys Nyom Nyom
- (Cameroon) Mark O'Ojong – Song Lam Nghe An – 2022
- Serge Okala
- Mathias Penge
- Ernest Emako-Siankam
- (Cameroon) **Joel Tagueu** – Hanoi FC, Haiphong – 2023–2024, 2025–
- Ayukokata També
- Joël Tchami
- Yves Kalamen Tchaptset – Hue – 2001–2002
- Gaspard Yelleduor

== Canada ==
- **Tyler Crawford** – Thep Xanh Nam Dinh – 2026–
- Abraham François – Tien Giang – 2001
- **Pierre Lamothe** – Quang Nam, Hanoi FC, SHB Da Nang, Bac Ninh – 2023, 2024–
- Joevannie Peart – Becamex Binh Duong – 2008
- **Camilo Vasconcelos** – Haiphong – 2026–

== Cape Verde ==
- (Cape Verde) Carlos Fortes – Song Lam Nghe An – 2026
- (Cape Verde) Fufuco – Hanoi T&T – 2011–2012

== Central African Republic ==
- (Central African Republic) Franklin Clovis Anzité – Hoang Anh Gia Lai, Long An – 2015–2016

== Chile ==
- Luis Alejandro – Haiphong – 2004
- Alfredo Figueroa – Song Da Nam Dinh – 2005
- Alberto González
- Edson Hoces – Thep Pomina Tien Giang – 2005
- Gonzalo Martínez (a.k.a. Gonzalo Javier) – LG Hanoi ACB – 2004
- Mauricio Neveu – Hoa Phat Hanoi – 2004
- Pacho Rubio – Huda Hue, Thep Pomina Tien Giang, Starta Dong Nai – 2004–2006

== China PR ==
- He Zhiquiang
- Niu Jing Long
- Yu Xiang
- Zhao Shuang

== Colombia ==
- (Colombia) Orlando Berrío – PVF-CAND – 2025
- Alex Fernando
- Edison Fonseca – Navibank Saigon – 2011–2013
- **Juanjo Narváez** – Cong An Ho Chi Minh City – 2026–
- Santiago Patiño – Ho Chi Minh City – 2024
- **Brayan Perea** – Cong An Hanoi – 2026–
- Carlos Rentería – Song Lam Nghe An – 2025–2026
- Rodrigo Rivas – Quy Nhon Binh Dinh – 2024–2025
- Luis Salazar – Quy Nhon Binh Dinh – 2024–2025

== Congo (Republic of the Congo) ==
- Fudje Bosango
- (Republic of the Congo) Herby Fortunat
- (Republic of the Congo) Prince Ibara
- (Republic of the Congo) Juvhel Tsoumou

== Costa Rica ==
- (Costa Rica) José Guillermo Ortiz – Ho Chi Minh City – 2020
- (Costa Rica) Ariel Francisco Rodríguez – Ho Chi Minh City – 2020

== Croatia ==
- Josip Balić
- Luka Bobičanec – Hanoi FC – 2025
- Ivica Čokolić – TDC Binh Duong, Ho Chi Minh City – 2010–2011
- Mladen Čučić
- Matko Djarmati
- Goran Gajić – Hanoi ACB, Hue – 2009–2011
- Goran Gruica - Hanoi T&T – 2014
- Josip Ivančić
- **Di Mateo Lovrić** – Thanh Hoa – 2026–
- Mario Mijatović - Hoang Anh Gia Lai - 2010
- Tonći Mujan
- Anto Pejić – SHB Da Nang – 2015
- Arnel Petrović – The Cong-Viettel – 2007
- Marko Šimić
- Adrian Valentić
- Josip Zeba
- Mario Zebić – Song Lam Nghe An – 2023–2024

== Cuba ==
- (Cuba) Yaikel Pérez - SHB Da Nang - 2015

== Curaçao ==
- (Curaçao) Dyron Daal – Kien Giang – 2012
- (Curaçao) **Kevin Felida** – Hanoi FC – 2026–

== Czech Republic ==
- Jan Hubka
- Tomáš Jakus
- Petr Sedlak
- Michal Šilhavý
- Jan Žemlík

== Denmark ==
- **Ilias Namli** – Van Hien University – 2026–
- **Quoc Minh Truong** – Khatoco Khanh Hoa, Quang Nam – 2023–2024, 2026–

== DR Congo (Democratic Republic of the Congo) ==
- (Democratic Republic of the Congo) Chadrac Akolo – Thep Xanh Nam Dinh – 2025–2026
- Cédric Bolima
- Tuba Kisolokele
- (Democratic Republic of the Congo) Arnaud Lusamba – Thep Xanh Nam Dinh – 2025–2026
- Luc Mbungu
- Lusenge Mumbere
- (Democratic Republic of the Congo) Liswa Nduti
- (Democratic Republic of the Congo) Marcel Nkueni
- Franklin Mata Sukami
- (Democratic Republic of the Congo) Patiyo Tambwe – Lam Son Thanh Hoa, Vissai Ninh Binh, An Giang, QNK Quang Nam, XSKT Can Tho. Than Quang Ninh, Nam Dinh, Sanna Khanh Hoa – 2013–2019
- Grace Tanda

== Egypt ==
- Mohamed Essam – The Cong-Viettel – 2023–2024
- (Egypt) **Alexander Jakobsen** – Quy Nhon United – 2026–

== England ==
- Alex Bruce - Ho Chi Minh City - 2023
- **David Fisher** – Hanoi FC, Bac Ninh – 2026–
- Barry Guildford - Than Quang Ninh - 2000
- Kyle Hudlin – Thep Xanh Nam Dinh – 2025–2026
- Noel Mbo – Hong Linh Ha Tinh, Cong Ho Chi Minh City – 2024–2025
- Jamie Phoenix - Dong Thap - 2007
- Vitor S. Smith - Hoang Anh Gia Lai - 2001

== Equatorial Guinea ==
- (Equatorial Guinea) **Esteban Obiang** – Haiphong – 2026–

== Estonia ==
- (Estonia) Erik Sorga – Ho Chi Minh City FC – 2024–2025

== Ethiopia ==
- (Ethiopia) Fikru Teferra – Thanh Hoa – 2012

== France ==
- Evan Abran – Ninh Binh, Ho Chi Minh City Youth – 2025–2026
- Loris Arnaud - Hanoi T&T - 2016–2017
- **Aymeric Faurand-Tournaire** – Hanoi FC – 2026–
- Antoine Goulard - Hanoi T&T - 2015
- Vincent Guyenne - Phu Dong, Ho Chi Minh City - 2022–2023
- Ryan Ha – Khanh Hoa, Becamex Binh Duong, Hanoi FC, PVF-CAND, Hoang Anh Gia Lai – 2023–2026
- **Andrew Jung** – Hanoi FC – 2026–
- Papa Ibou Kébé
- Aboubakar Koné
- Damien Le Tallec – Hanoi FC – 2023
- **Kalvin Luong** – Thep Xanh Nam Dinh, SHB Da Nang – 2026–
- Cédric Moukouri
- Rodrigue Nanitelamo
- Johnny Nguyen
- Victor Nirennold
- Philippe Nsiah
- **Kevin Pham Ba** – Cong An Hanoi, Thep Xanh Nam Dinh – 2025–
- Frederic Rault
- David Serene
- Youssouf Toure – Khanh Hoa, Becamex Binh Duong – 2017–2020
- **Abdel-Amine Tran** – Song Lam Nghe An – 2026–
- **Phi-Long Tran** – Song Lam Nghe An – 2026–
- **Arthur Yamga** – Cong An Ho Chi Minh City – 2026–
- Chaher Zarour - Khanh Hoa - 2016–2019

== Gambia (The Gambia) ==
- Dawda Ceesay
- (The Gambia) Modou Jagne
- (The Gambia) Alagie Sosseh

== Georgia (Georgia (country)) ==
- Irakli Kokhreidze
- (Georgia (country)) Mamuka Tsereteli – Dong Lam Long An – 2006–2007

== Germany ==
- Marko Kück – The Cong-Viettel – 2008
- Gramoz Kurtaj – SHB Da Nang, Thanh Hoa, Nam Dinh – 2017–2019, 2021
- Joseph Laumann – Vissai Ninh Binh – 2011
- **Hong Lac Luong Thanh** – Cong An Nhan Dan – 2026–
- Nhu Duc Anh Nguyen – Haiphong, PVF-CAND – 2023–2026
- Ali Parhizi – Haiphong – 2013
- Dominik Schmitt – SHB Da Nang – 2019
- Giovanni Speranza - Vissai Ninh Binh, Kienlongbank Kien Giang, Daklak – 2011–2014
- Alexandros Tanidis – Becamex Binh Duong – 2018

== Ghana ==
- Felix Abayomy – Haiphong – 2004
- Shamo Abbey
- (Ghana) Felix Aboagye
- Bernard Achaw
- William Anane
- David Annas
- Kwame Attram
- (Ghana) Abdul Basit – Song Lam Nghe An, Hong Linh Ha Tinh – 2022
- (Ghana) Foster Bastios – Khatoco Khanh Hoa – 2006
- Emanuel Bentil
- Enock Bentil
- Yaw Berko – Khatoco Khanh Hoa – 2005
- (Ghana) Bernard Dong Bortey – Song Lam Nghe An – 2011–2012
- Benjamin Mawusi Dzigba
- Martin Dzilah – Hoang Anh Gia Lai – 2023
- (Ghana) Mustapha Essuman
- (Ghana) Joseph Hendricks
- Anthony Kankam
- Gerald Kofie
- Aboubakar Mahadi
- Michael Mensah
- Bawa Mumuni – Nam Dinh – 2010
- Daniel Obo
- Emmanuel Okutu
- (Ghana) Edmund Owusu-Ansah
- (Ghana) Yaw Preko
- (Ghana) Ibrahim Abdul Razak – Vissai Ninh Binh – 2011–2012
- Arnas Seidu Saleman – Song Lam Nghe An – 2000–2001
- Issifu Seidu
- Seidu Ninche Shafiwu
- Zakaria Suraka – Hong Linh Ha Tinh – 2022
- Kwasi Poku Yeboah

== Guadeloupe ==
- (Guadeloupe) Larry Clavier – Dong Tam Long An – 2012

== Guam ==
- (Guam) Brandon McDonald – Hanoi FC – 2019

== Guinea ==
- Mamadou Guirassy – Khanh Hoa – 2023–2024
- Foday Abass Sillah
- Fodebangaly Sylla
- Sekou Sylla – Haiphong – 2020

== Guinea-Bissau ==
- (Guinea-Bissau) Amido Baldé – Ho Chi Minh City – 2020
- (Guinea-Bissau) João Mário – Hoang Anh Gia Lai, Quy Nhon Binh Dinh – 2023–2024
- (Guinea-Bissau) João Pedro – Hanoi FC – 2024–2025
- Malam Sano

== Haiti ==
- Ashkanov Apollon – Long An – 2017
- (Haiti) **Bicou Bissainthe** – Haiphong – 2023–
- Miche-Naider Chéry – Haiphong – 2025
- Watz-Landy Leazard – Khanh Hoa, Van Hien University – 2023–2024, 2026
- (Haiti) Jean-Eudes Maurice – Saigon FC – 2016

== Hungary ==
- Attila Katona – Thể Công – 2008
- Károly Kovacsics
- Takacs Lajos
- Mátyás Lázár
- József Ördög
- (Hungary) Krisztián Timár – SHB Da Nang – 2011–2012

== Italy ==
- Davide Nguyen – Becamex Binh Duong – 2018–2019
- Manuel Vergori – Can Tho – 2010

== Iran ==
- (Iran) Iman Alami – Cong An Hanoi – 2001
- Mirshad Majedi - Hoang Anh Gia Lai, Can Tho – 2001–2004
- Sajjad Moshkelpour – Hanoi FC – 2019

== Iraq ==
- (Iraq) **Frans Putros** – Cong An Hanoi – 2026–

== Israel ==
- **Yuval Sade** – Hanoi FC – 2026–

== Ivory Coast ==
- Jean-Baptiste Agnimou
- Musa Aliu - Saigon Port - 2000-2001
- Youssouf Cissé - Saigon Port - 2000-2001
- Kouassi Yao Hermann
- Mohamed Idris
- Kasim Bakary Koné
- Mohamed Koné
- Moussa Saib Koné
- Oussou Konan Anicet – Nam Dinh – 2021
- Baba Ouattara
- Douhou Pierre
- Duru Law Rotam
- Moussa Sanogo
- Cheick Timité – Ho Chi Minh City, Becamex Binh Duong – 2023–2025

== Jamaica ==
- (Jamaica) Nicholas Addlery
- (Jamaica) Kavin Bryan
- (Jamaica) Atapharoy Bygrave
- (Jamaica) Andre Clennon
- Andre Fagan
- Jourdaine Fletcher – Haiphong – 2026
- (Jamaica) Sean Fraser
- **Rimario Gordon** – Hoang Anh Gia Lai, Thanh Hoa, Binh Dinh, Hanoi FC, Haiphong, Becamex Binh Duong, The Cong-Viettel – 2018–
- (Jamaica) Daniel Green
- (Jamaica) Devon Hodges
- Horace James
- (Jamaica) **Jermie Lynch** – Song Lam Nghe An, Haiphong, Than Quang Ninh, Binh Dinh, Van Hien University, Ho Chi Minh City FC – 2018–2022, 2025–
- (Jamaica) Errol Stevens
- Chevaughn Walsh

== Japan ==
- Nii Hidemoto
- Masaaki Ideguchi
- Dan Ito
- Ryutaro Karube – Saigon FC – 2021
- (Japan) Daisuke Matsui – Saigon FC – 2021
- Hiroyuki Takasaki – Saigon FC – 2021

== Kazakhstan ==
- Denis Imailov
- (Kazakhstan) Naken Kyrykbaev – Cong An Hanoi – 2001–2002

== Kenya ==
- Harrison Muranda
- (Kenya) James Omondi
- (Kenya) Duncan Ochieng
- (Kenya) Maurice Sunguti
- (Kenya) Jerry Santos
- (Kenya) Allan Wanga

== Kyrgyzstan ==
- (Kyrgyzstan) **Odilzhon Abdurakhmanov** – Becamex Binh Duong, Thanh Hoa – 2024–
- (Kyrgyzstan) Mirlan Murzayev – Hanoi FC – 2023
- (Kyrgyzstan) Veniamin Shumeyko – Becamex Binh Duong – 2019–2020

== Laos ==
- (Laos) **Damoth Thongkhamsavath** – Thanh Hoa – 2025–

== Liberia ==
- (Liberia) Buston Browne
- (Liberia) Samuel Chebli
- Sam Garmojaly Dee
- Vafin Dolley
- (Liberia) Alex Karmo
- (Liberia) Jonah Sarrweah
- Christopher Udensi

== Lithuania ==
- (Lithuania) Vytas Gašpuitis – Song Lam Nghe An – 2023

== Luxembourg ==
- (Luxembourg) Tim Hall – Hanoi FC – 2024

== Malawi ==
- (Malawi) Victor Nyirenda – Dong Nai, Dong Thap – 2013–2014

== Malaysia ==
- (Malaysia) Endrick – Cong An Ho Chi Minh City – 2024–2026

== Mali ==
- Souleymane Camara
- Kalifa Dembélé
- Souleymane Diabate – XSKT Can Tho, Long An – 2010–2015
- (Mali) **Saliou Guindo** – Thanh Hoa – 2026–

== Mauritania ==
- (Mauritania) Dominique Da Sylva – Ho Chi Minh City, Saigon FC – 2017–2019

== Mexico ==
- Givaldo de Abreu – Tien Giang – 2006
- Arturo Cisneros – Tien Giang, Saigon Port – 2003–2004

== Moldova ==
- (Moldova) Vladimir Cosse – Vietnam Airlines – 2003

== Montenegro ==
- Zdravko Dragićević
- Danko Kovačević

== Morocco ==
- Mohammed Regragui – Saigon Port – 2005

== Mozambique ==
- (Mozambique) Nuro Tualibudane – Da Nang – 2003–2005
- (Mozambique) Tomás Inguana – Nam Dinh – 2004

== Namibia ==
- (Namibia) Sydney Plaatjies – Dong Thap – 2012

== Netherlands ==
- **Dirk Abels** – Cong An Ho Chi Minh City – 2026–
- Koen Bosma – Song Lam Nghe An – 2015
- Mitchell Dijks – Thep Xanh Nam Dinh – 2025–2026
- Frank van Eijs – Hanoi ACB – 2005
- Romario Kortzorg – Nam Dinh, Becamex Binh Duong – 2017–2018
- Alexander Prent – SHB Da Nang – 2011–2012
- Mark Rutgers – SQC Binh Dinh – 2012
- Robbie Servais – Song Lam Nghe An – 2006–2007
- Wieger Sietsma – Hoang Anh Gia Lai – 2019
- Keziah Veendorp – Hanoi FC – 2024

== Nicaragua ==
- (Nicaragua) Matías Moldskred Belli – Dong A Thanh Hoa – 2026

== Nigeria ==
- Haruna Abdul – Song Lam Nghe An – 2015
- Clement Achilefu
- Emeka Achilefu – Hanoi ACB, Nam Dinh, Da Nang – 2002–2005
- Achinike – Song Lam Nghe An – 2005–2006
- Yahaya Adamu
- Anthony Adedeji
- (Nigeria) Mutiu Adegoke – The Cong – 2008
- Abraham Adelaja
- Hammed Adesope – Dong Thap, Kienlongbank Kien Giang – 2010–2013
- Bakare Ganiyu Adewunmi
- Ochai Agbaji
- Olumuyiwa Aganun
- Emmanuel Tony Agbaji
- Felix Gbenga Ajala – Dong Thap – 2015
- (Nigeria) Muisi Ajao – Da Nang – 2003–2004
- Golden Ajeboh
- Ismahil Akinade – Ho Chi Minh City, SHB Da Nang, Hong Linh Ha Tinh – 2020–2021
- (Nigeria) Bassey Akpan – Hoang Anh Gia Lai – 2012–2014
- Ebimo West Anderson
- Timothy Anjembe – Vissai Ninh Bình, Dong Thap, Hoa Phat Hanoi, Hanoi ACB, Hoang Anh Gia Lai, FLC Thanh Hoa – 2009–2016
- Ativie Guy Ijiebor Ativie
- (Nigeria) **Charles Atshimene** – Becamex Binh Duong, Quang Nam, Hong Linh Ha Tinh – 2024–
- (Nigeria) Sam Ayorinde – Da Nang – 2005–2006
- George Bisan – Than Quang Ninh – 2016
- (Nigeria) Sunday Chibuike
- Augustine Chidi Kwem – Hanoi FC – 2024–2025
- Prince Eboagwu
- Chidi Edeh
- Emmanuel Ejike
- Igwe Ejke
- Aniekan Ekpe
- Abdulrazak Ekpoki
- Egware Emmanuel Eloh
- Francis Emeka
- Declan Emeribe
- (Nigeria) Sunday Emmanuel - FLC Thanh Hoa, Becamex Binh Duong, Than Quang Ninh, XSKT Can Tho – 2011–2014, 2016–2018
- Alfred Emuejeraye – Boss Binh Dinh – 2006
- Okon Flo Essien
- Anthony Eviparker
- (Nigeria) Stephen Eze – Quang Nam – 2023–2024
- (Nigeria) Teslim Fatusi
- Udo Fortune
- **Fred Friday** – Haiphong, Ninh Binh – 2025–
- Alhaji Gero – Hong Linh Ha Tinh – 2025
- Stephen Gopey – Hong Linh Ha Tinh – 2023
- Emeka Christian Ibe – Song Da Nam Dinh – 2005
- Endurance Idahor – Đồng Tâm Long An – 2004
- (Nigeria) Osas Idehen
- Uche Iheruome
- Sunday Ilevbare
- Andrew Amakuro Inerepamo
- Origbaajo Ismaila – Becamex Ho Chi Minh City – 2025
- (Nigeria) Emmanuel Izuagha – Đồng Tâm Long An – 2004–2005
- Ibe Johnson – Haiphong, Tay Ninh – 2005–2007
- Iliya Buba Johnson
- Kelly Kester
- Abia Kobedi – Song Lam Nghe An – 2006
- Samson Kpenosen
- Benjamin Kuku – Song Lam Nghe An – 2024–2025
- Odah Marshall – Song Lam Nghe An – 2016
- Samuel Nnamani – Thep Xanh Nam Dinh – 2023
- Paul Nwachukwu
- Joseph Nwafor
- Dickson Nwakaeme
- Michael Odibe
- Ajoku Obinna
- Moses Tochukwu Odo – Thep Xanh Nam Dinh – 2024
- Ugochukwu Oduenyi – Quang Nam, Becamex Ho Chi Minh City – 2025–2026
- Edward Ofere
- Jerome Ogbuefi
- Felix Ogbuke
- Adebowale Ogungbure
- Emeka Oguwike
- Henry Okoro
- Philip Okoro
- Peter Omoduemuke
- **Joseph Onoja** – Becamex Binh Duong, Hong Linh Ha Tinh, Song Lam Nghe An – 2024, 2025–
- Abiodun Folorunso Oyebola
- Daniel Onyekachi
- Peter Onyekachi
- Ifeanyi Frederick Onuigbo
- Andrew Opara
- (Nigeria) Christian Osaguona – SHB Da Nang – 2022
- Ganiyu Oseni - Kienlongbank Kien Giang, Hoang Anh Gia Lai, Long An, Becamex Binh Duong, XSKT Can Tho, Hanoi FC, Song Lam Nghe An, Topenland Binh Dinh – 2011–2013, 2014–2019, 2022–2023
- Egbo Osita
- Ejife Ozotite
- Tonka Primus – Dong Tam Long An – 2003
- Abdula Wasiu Saliu
- Monday Samuel
- Abdul Latif Seriki
- Onome Sodje – Dong Nai –
- Raphael Success – Cong An Hanoi, Song Lam Nghe An – 2023–2024
- Christopher Ikechukwu Udensi – Song Da Nam Dinh, Da Nang – 2006
- Blessing Ughojo
- Basden Uzoehere
- Chinedu Udoka
- Ifeanyi Uwanaka
- Akanni-Sunday Wasiu
- Amadi Wenenda - Saigon Port - 2000-2001
- Anderson West – Long An – 2013–2014
- Olajide Williams – Thanh Hoa – 2009

== North Macedonia ==
- Dragan Jakovlevski
- Nikolce Klečkarovski
- (North Macedonia) Filip Madžovski

== Norway ==
- Kristoffer Normann Hansen – Thep Xanh Nam Dinh – 2025–2026

== Palestine ==
- (Palestine) Mahmoud Eid – Thep Xanh Nam Dinh, PVF-CAND – 2025–2026
- (Palestine) Matias Jadue – Ho Chi Minh City – 2018–2019

== Paraguay ==
- Inreneo Collante – Megastar Nam Dinh – 2010
- Anggello Machuca – T&T Hanoi – 2011
- Ronald Obregon Ojeda – Halida Thanh Hoa – 2006
- Sebastián Zaracho – Song Lam Nghe An – 2024–2025

== Philippines ==
- (Philippines) Alfredo Razon Gonzalez – Dong A Bank – 2003
- (Philippines) Álvaro Silva – Hanoi FC – 2017

== Poland ==
- (Poland) Tomasz Cebula – Da Nang, An Giang – 2001–2004
- Makholaz Makhharvekrick – Tien Giang – 2003
- **Damian Vu Thanh** – The Cong-Viettel – 2025–
- Mariusz Wysocki – Da Nang – 2001–2003

== Portugal ==
- Hugo Alves – Becamex Ho Chi Minh City – 2025–2026
- Carlos Fangueiro
- Claudio Gomes
- Jucie Lupeta – Haiphong – 2026
- Elton Monteiro – Cong An Hanoi – 2023
- Muacir – Khanh Hoa – 2022
- Paulo Tavares
- André Vieira

== Puerto Rico ==
- (Puerto Rico) John Krause – Hòa Phát Hà Nội – 2010
- (Puerto Rico) Sidney Rivera – Than Quang Ninh – 2019

== Republic of Ireland ==
- (Republic of Ireland) **Cyrus Christie** – Hanoi FC – 2026–
- **Brandon Ly** – Cong An Hanoi, Xuan Thien Phu Tho – 2025–
- **Bryan Ly** – SHB Da Nang – 2026–

== Romania ==
- Cosmin Goia
- (Romania) **Andrei Ivan** – Dong Nai City – 2026–
- Robert Niță – Viettel – 2008–2010
- István Teger
- Petrisor Voinea

== Russia ==
- Andrey Bulanov – A Chau Bank – 2000–2001
- Oleg Davy Penko
- Rod Dyachenko – Than Quang Ninh, Ho Chi Minh City, Can Tho – 2016–2019
- Aleksei Iline
- Sergiy Ivane
- Ivan Khleborodov – Long An – 2025–2026
- Aleksandr Khomyakov
- Sergey Komyagin
- Sergei Kondratev
- Sergei Kozlov – Binh Dinh – 2001–2002
- Pavel Kurnosov
- Konstantin Lasoryb
- Serguey Litvinov
- Mikhail Matveev – Binh Dinh – 2001–2002
- Vyacheslav Melnikov – Dong Thap – 2007
- Khairulin Mikhailovich
- Alexei Mozalevski
- Alexei Orlov
- Oleg Ostudin
- Leonid Panteleimonov
- Oleg Reshetov
- Ruslan Reshetov
- Yaroslav Rymachuk
- Aleksei Sagcheneko
- Eduard Sakhnevich – Saigon Port, Becamex Binh Duong – 2003, 2010
- Sergey Smokin
- Igor Sukhovey – Binh Dinh – 2001–2002
- Nikolay Tkachenko – Nam Dinh - 2004–2005
- Viktor Trenev
- Igor Trifonov
- Vladimir Yvedenski – Khanh Hoa – 2001–2002

== Rwanda ==
- (Rwanda) Karim Kamanzi
- (Rwanda) Jimmy Mulisa – Haiphong – 2005
- (Rwanda) Julien Nsengiyumva
- (Rwanda) Roger Tchouassi

== Scotland ==
- Alastair Reynolds – PVF-CAND – 2026
- David Winters – Can Tho – 2010

== Senegal ==
- Papé Diakité
- Abdoulaye Diallo
- Abass Cheikh Dieng
- Pape Omar Faye
- Mamadou Mbodj – Dong A Thanh Hoa – 2025–2026
- Mohamed Moustapha N'diaye
- Diao Sadio

== Serbia ==
- Obren Čučković
- Slobodan Dinčić
- Milorad Janjuš
- Igor Jelić
- Milan Jevtović – Hanoi FC – 2023–2024
- **Filip Jović** – Dong Nai City – 2026–
- **Andrija Majdevac** – Dong Nai City – 2026–
- Bojan Mamić
- Ivan Marić – SHB Da Nang – 2022
- (Serbia) **Milan Makarić** – SHB Da Nang, Haiphong – 2025–
- Damir Memović
- Dalibor Mitrović
- **Ivan Šaponjić** – SHB Da Nang – 2026–
- Vladimir Silađi – Hanoi FC – 2022
- Nenad Stojaković
- (Serbia) **Miloš Vulić** – Dong Nai City – 2026–
- Đuro Zec – Hanoi FC – 2022
- Miloš Zlatković – Becamex Ho Chi Minh City – 2025–2026

== Seychelles ==
- (Seychelles) Yelvanny Rose – Đồng Tâm Long An, Quang Nam – 2005

== Sierra Leone ==
- (Sierra Leone) Aluspah Brewah
- Abu Desmond Mansaray
- (Sierra Leone) Lamin Massaquoi
- Brima Pepito
- (Sierra Leone) Umaru Rahman
- (Sierra Leone) Mustapha Sama
- (Sierra Leone) Kabba Samura
- (Sierra Leone) Alie Sesay
- (Sierra Leone) Hassan Koeman Sesay

== Slovakia ==
- Roman Golian
- Marek Matkobis
- Thanh Tiep Pham
- Vladimir Zlacky

== Slovenia ==
- (Slovenia) Nastja Ceh – Thanh Hoa – 2013–2014
- (Slovenia) Ivan Firer – Thanh Hoa, Becamex Binh Duong – 2016
- Tomislav Mišura – Tien Giang – 2011–2012
- (Slovenia) Mitja Mörec – Hoang Anh Gia Lai – 2014

== South Africa ==
- (South Africa) Njabulo Blom – Thep Xanh Nam Dinh – 2025–2026
- Kenny Damas – Dong Tam Long An – 2004
- (South Africa) Jabulani Mnguni – Song Lam Nghe An – 2005
- (South Africa) Joseph Ngake – Hanoi ACB – 2008
- (South Africa) Dumisa Ngobe – An Giang – 2006
- Philani – Becamex Binh Duong – 2006–2013
- Diyo Sibisi – Tay Ninh – 2014
- (South Africa) Percy Tau – Thep Xanh Nam Dinh – 2025–2026

== South Korea ==
- Ahn Byung-keon – Saigon FC, Binh Dinh – 2020–2022
- An Sae-hee – Hoang Anh Gia Lai – 2022–2023
- Cha Myung-phi
- Chun Dae-hwan
- Han Seung-yeop – Becamex Binh Duong – 2016
- Hwang Jung-man
- Hwang Jung-min
- Kim Bong-jin – Hoang Anh Gia Lai – 2019
- Kim Dae-chul
- Kim Dong-su – Hoang Anh Gia Lai, SHB Da Nang – 2021–2022, 2025
- Kim Gwan-hoi
- Kim Jin-seo – Hoang Anh Gia Lai – 2018
- Kim Won-sik – Dong A Thanh Hoa – 2023
- Lee Yoo-sung
- Nam Chul-choi
- Park Sung-kwang
- Seo Yong-duk – Ho Chi Minh City – 2020
- Sim Woon-sub – Long An – 2014, 2017
- Suh Youn-jae
- Sul Ik-chan
- Woo Sang-ho – Saigon FC – 2021
- (South Korea) Yang Hyun-jung – Saigon Port – 2006

== South Sudan ==
- (South Sudan) **Dor Jok** – Aurora Saigon United – 2026–

== Spain ==
- Mario Arqués – Song Lam Nghe An – 2022
- Melquiades Candelario – Xuan Thanh Saigon, Dong Nai, SHB Da Nang, Than Quang Ninh – 2013–2015
- Pablo Couñago – Dong Tam Long An – 2012
- Carlos Fernández – Haiphong – 2023
- **Damià Sabater** – Cong An Hanoi – 2026–

== Sweden ==
- Darko Lukanović – Hoang Anh Gia Lai – 2015
- (Sweden) Viktor Prodell – Ho Chi Minh City – 2020
- Eddie Tran – Bac Ninh – 2025–2026

== Tajikistan ==
- (Tajikistan) Umed Khabibulloyev – Vietnam Airlines, The Cong – 2003–2004
- (Tajikistan) Alisher Tukhtaev – The Cong – 2003

== Tanzania ==
- (Tanzania) Abdi Kassim – Dong Tam Long An – 2011
- (Tanzania) Danny Mrwanda – Dong Tam Long An, Da Nang – 2010–2012, 2013–2014

== Thailand ==
- Yuttadong Bunamporn – Da My Nghe Saigon – 2005–2006
- (Thailand) Sarayoot Chaikamdee – Pisico Binh Dinh – 2005–2007
- (Thailand) Therdsak Chaiman – Dong A Bank – 2004
- (Thailand) Dusit Chalermsan – Hoang Anh Gia Lai – 2003–2007
- Preecha Chaokla
- (Thailand) Thawatchai Damrong-Ongtrakul – Dong Nai – 2006
- Ekaphan Inthasen
- (Thailand) Vimol Jankam – Hoang Anh Gia Lai – 2006
- (Thailand) Yuttajak Kornchan – Hoang Anh Gia Lai, An Giang – 2003–2006
- (Thailand) Pitipong Kuldilok – Dong A Bank – 2005
- (Thailand) Chukiat Noosarung – Hoang Anh Gia Lai – 2002–2004
- (Thailand) Manit Noywech – Boss Binh Dinh – 2004–2005
- Somsit Orusomchit
- Wirot Pashrdon
- (Thailand) Pattara Piyapatrakitti – Thep Pomina Tien Giang – 2006
- (Thailand) Choketawee Promrut – Hoang Anh Gia Lai – 2005
- (Thailand) Kittisak Rawangpa – Da My Nghe Saigon – 2005–2006
- (Thailand) Kiatisuk Senamuang – Hoang Anh Gia Lai – 2002–2006
- (Thailand) Issawa Singthong – Pisico Binh Dinh, An Giang, Dong Thap – 2003–2008, 2009
- (Thailand) Niweat Siriwong – Dong A Bank, Tien Giang – 2004–2007
- (Thailand) Worrawoot Srimaka – Boss Binh Dinh – 2004–2005
- (Thailand) Tawan Sripan – Hoang Anh Gia Lai – 2004–2006
- (Thailand) Datsakorn Thonglao – Hoang Anh Gia Lai – 2007–2009
- (Thailand) Pipat Thonkanya – Boss Binh Dinh, Dong Thap –2002–2006
- (Thailand) Ekkaluck Thonghkit – Hoang Anh Gia Lai – 2009
- (Thailand) Narongchai Vachiraban – Boss Binh Dinh – 2005
- Kriangsak Praphakorn Wanitchak – Thep Pomina Tien Giang – 2006

== Togo ==
- (Togo) Vincent Bossou
- Yacoubou Fousseni Cherif
- (Togo) **David Henen** – SHB Da Nang, Cong An Hanoi – 2025–
- (Togo) Nouhoum Moutawakil – Khanh Hoa – 2006–2007
- (Togo) Raphaël Patron Akakpo – Khanh Hoa – 2005–2006
- (Togo) Alfa Potowabawi

== Trinidad and Tobago ==
- (Trinidad and Tobago) Neil Benjamin – Nam Dinh – 2018
- (Trinidad and Tobago) Daneil Cyrus – Hanoi T&T – 2014
- (Trinidad and Tobago) Justin Garcia – Song Lam Nghe An – 2025–2026
- (Trinidad and Tobago) Hughtun Hector – Song Lam Nghe An, Hanoi T&T – 2012–2015
- Shackeil Henry – Song Lam Nghe An, Nam Dinh – 2017–2018
- **Shaqkeem Joseph** – Hung Yen – 2025–
- (Trinidad and Tobago) Reon Moore – Song Lam Nghe An – 2025–2026
- (Trinidad and Tobago) Willis Plaza – Navibank Saigon, Song Lam Nghe An – 2012–2013

== Tunisia ==
- (Tunisia) Belhassen Aloui – Binh Duong, Mikado Nam Dinh, Da Nang – 2004–2006
- Makram Kridene

== Turks and Caicos Islands ==
- (Turks and Caicos Islands) Gavin Glinton – Nam Dinh – 2010–2011

== Uganda ==
- (Uganda) Iddi Batambuje – Song Lam Nghe An, Da Nang – 2000–2003
- Asman Bogere
- Lawrence Rotam Duru
- (Uganda) Ibrahim Juma
- Henry Kakooza
- (Uganda) Edward Kalungi – Hue – 2004
- (Uganda) Sam Kawalya
- (Uganda) Charles Kayemba
- (Uganda) Yusuf Kinene
- (Uganda) Henry Kisekka
- (Uganda) Ibrahim Kizito
- Lawrence Kizito
- (Uganda) Ibrahim Kongo
- (Uganda) Jamil Kyambadde
- Willy Kyambadde
- (Uganda) Enock Kyembe
- (Uganda) Lulenti Kyeyune
- (Uganda) Livingstone Kyobe
- (Uganda) Andrew Lutaya Lule
- (Uganda) Charles Livingstone Mbabazi – Hanoi ACB, Binh Duong – 2006–2010
- (Uganda) **Joseph Mpande** – Haiphong, Thep Xanh Nam Dinh, PVF-CAND – 2019–
- (Uganda) Majid Musisi – Da Nang – 2002–2004
- Joseph Harold Mutyaba – Quang Nam – 2006
- (Uganda) Andrew Mwesigwa – Saigon FC – 2016
- Kisekka Daniel Ntale
- (Uganda) Joseph Ochaya
- (Uganda) James Odoch
- (Uganda) Caesar Okhuti – Vissai Ninh Binh – 2011
- (Uganda) Moses Oloya – Xuan Thanh Saigon, Becamex Binh Duong, Hanoi FC, Haiphong – 2011–2016, 2017–2023, 2026
- Francis Onyango
- (Uganda) Kasule Owen
- Isa Sawanyana
- (Uganda) Fred Tamale
- (Uganda) Brian Umony
- Roy Lukungu Waiwa
- (Uganda) Hassan Wasswa

== Ukraine ==
- Andrei Afnasiev
- Anatony Tolik Balatskyi
- Aleksandr Balenko
- Yevhen Bokhashvili – Nam Dinh – 2022
- Ivan Carbina
- Chekhovskyy
- Yevgen Diachenko
- Oleksandr Gnatenko
- Vladimir Ivanovich
- Ivan Karpina
- Yuri Klimenko
- **Oleksandr Kurakin** – Khatoco Khanh Hoa – 2026–
- Vyacheslav Lepyavko
- Stanislav Loban – Dong Thap – 2001–2002
- Yuriy Markin
- Yorkin Nazarov
- Yevgen Nemodruk
- Dmytro Pronevych
- Raltrenko
- Oleg Samchenko
- Yevhen Serdyuk – Hong Linh Ha Tinh – 2025
- Boric Shevelyuk
- Oleksandr Sydorenko
- Yevgen Tsepkalo
- (Ukraine) Artem Yashkin – Dong Thap – 2005

== United States ==
- Jonny Campbell
- Kenny Phi Hoang Chandler – Hong Linh Ha Tinh, Mekong Can Tho – 2022, 2026
- Steven Dang
- Mobi Fehr
- **Reece Gaylor** – Thep Xanh Nam Dinh, Bac Ninh – 2026–
- Mark Huynh – Haiphong, PVF-CAND – 2024–2026
- Vinh Le – Ho Chi Minh City, Ba Ria-Vung Tau, Dong Thap – 2023–2025
- **Ian Mai** – Hong Linh Ha Tinh – 2026–
- **Victor Mansaray** – Becamex Binh Duong, Ho Chi Minh City, Hong Linh Ha Tinh, Nam Dinh, Thai Nguyen – 2019–2023, 2026–
- Franklin Mata Sukam
- Justin Myers
- Kevin Nguyen – Haiphong – 2016
- (United States) Lee Nguyen
- **Zan Nguyen** – Ho Chi Minh City FC (2016), Ho Chi Minh City FC (2025) – 2024–
- Danny Reid – PVF-CAND – 2024
- Cyrus Tran – Becamex Binh Duong – 2024
- Christopher Williams – SHB Da Nang – 2010

== Uruguay ==
- **Yvo Calleros** – SHB Da Nang – 2026–
- **Matías Fracchia** – SHB Da Nang – 2026–
- Diego Nogues – Khatoco Khanh Hoa – 2010

== Uzbekistan ==
- (Uzbekistan) Jahongir Abdumominov
- (Uzbekistan) Yorqin Nazarov
- Gayrat Odilov

== Zambia ==
- (Zambia) Signs Chibambo
- Joseph Mwansa

== Zimbabwe ==
- (Zimbabwe) Victor Kamhuka
- (Zimbabwe) Justice Majabvi
- Samuel K. Mujabi
- Kelvin Mushangazhike
- (Zimbabwe) Morgan Nkathazo
