= Aniekan =

Aniekan is both a given name and a surname from Nigeria. Notable people with the name include:

- Aniekan Bassey, Nigerian businessman and politician
- Aniekan Ekpe (born 1986), Nigerian footballer
- Aniekan Udofia (born 1976), Nigerian artist
- Favour Aniekan (born 1994), Nigerian footballer
