= Basualdo =

Basualdo is a Spanish surname with significant usage in Argentina. Notable people with the surname include:

- Agustina Barroso Basualdo (born 1993), Argentine footballer
- Alberto Vernet Basualdo (born 1982), Argentine rugby union player
- Betiana Basualdo (born 1976), Argentine para-swimmer
- Carlos Basualdo (born 1964), Argentine curator
- Fabián Basualdo (born 1964), Argentine footballer
- Germán Basualdo (born 1984), Argentine footballer
- José Basualdo (born 1963), Argentine footballer
- Lucas Basualdo (born 1988), Argentine footballer
- Miguel Ángel Basualdo (born 1979), Argentine footballer
- Nahuel Basualdo (born 1991), Argentine footballer
- Roberto Basualdo (born 1957), Argentine politician
- Rodrigo Basualdo (born 1993), Argentine footballer
