= 2015 V.League 1 =

Toyota V.League 1 – 2015
- Season: 2015
- Dates: 4 January – 20 September
- Champions: Becamex Bình Dương
- Relegated: Đồng Nai
- Champions League: Becamex Bình Dương; Hà Nội
- Mekong Club Championship: Becamex Bình Dương
- Matches: 182
- Goals: 555 (3.05 per match)
- Top goalscorer: Tambwe Patiyo (18 goals)
- Biggest home win: Hà Nội 7–0 Đồng Tháp
- Biggest away win: XSKT Cần Thơ 0–5 SHB Đà Nẵng
- Highest scoring: SHB Đà Nẵng 7–3 Đồng Tâm Long An
- Highest attendance: 20,000
- Lowest attendance: 1,500
- Total attendance: 1,346,500
- Average attendance: 7,400
- All statistics correct as of 13:40, 21 September 2015.

The 2015 V.League 1 (known as the Toyota V.League 1 for sponsorship reasons) season was the 32nd season of the V.League 1, the highest division of Vietnamese football and the 15th as a professional league. The season began on 4 January 2015 and finished on 20 September 2015.

== Changes from last season ==
=== Team changes ===
The following teams have changed division since the 2014 season.

==== To V.League 1 ====
Promoted from V.League 2

- Đồng Tháp
- Sanna Khánh Hòa
- XSKT Cần Thơ

==== From V.League 1 ====
Relegated

- Hùng Vương An Giang

=== Rule Changes ===
In season 2015, a team standing on the 14th position was relegated to V-League 2. There was no play-off match as usual between team standing on 13th at V-League 1 and the second-position team at V-League 2.

Also, one club was only allowed to register 2 foreign players plus one naturalized player. Becamex Bình Dương and Hanoi T&T could register one more AFC player due to the qualification for AFC Champions League.

== Teams ==
Đồng Tháp were promoted after winning the 2014 V.League 2 championship, but in November 2014 they decided to withdraw from the league altogether. They later revered their decision once sponsorship was found to fund the side for the coming season.

Locations of the 2015 V.League 1 teams

=== Stadia ===
Team	Based	Home stadium	Capacity
Becamex Bình Dương	Thủ Dầu Một	Gò Đậu Stadium	18,250
Đồng Nai	Biên Hòa	Đồng Nai Stadium	25,000
Đồng Tâm Long An	Tân An	Long An Stadium	19,975
Đồng Tháp	Đồng Tháp	Cao Lãnh Stadium	23,000
Hà Nội	Hà Nội	Hàng Đẫy Stadium	22,000
Hải Phòng	Hải Phòng	Lạch Tray Stadium	28,000
Hoàng Anh Gia Lai	Pleiku	Pleiku Stadium	12,000
QNK Quảng Nam	Tam Kỳ	Tam Kỳ Stadium	15 624
Sanna Khánh Hòa	Nha Trang	19/8 Nha Trang Stadium	25,000
SHB Đà Nẵng	Đà Nẵng	Chi Lăng Stadium	28,000
Sông Lam Nghệ An	Vinh	Vinh Stadium	12,000
Than Quảng Ninh	Cẩm Phả	Cẩm Phả Stadium	15,000
Thanh Hóa	Thanh Hóa	Thanh Hóa Stadium	14,000
XSKT Cần Thơ	Cần Thơ	Cần Thơ Stadium	60,000

=== Personnel and kits ===
Note: Flags indicate national team as has been defined under FIFA eligibility rules. Players may hold more than one non-FIFA nationality.

Team	Manager^{1}	Captain	Kit manufacturer	Shirt sponsor
Becamex Bình Dương	(Vietnam) Nguyễn Thanh Sơn	(Vietnam) Nguyễn Anh Đức		Becamex IDC
Đồng Nai	(Vietnam) Trần Bình Sự	(Vietnam) Nguyễn Hải Anh		
Đồng Tâm Long An	(Vietnam) Ngô Quang Sang	(Vietnam) Phan Văn Tài Em		Đồng Tâm
Đồng Tháp	(Vietnam) Phạm Công Lộc	(Vietnam) Nguyễn Duy Khánh		Xổ số kiến thiết Đồng Tháp; HappyFood
Hà Nội T&T	(Vietnam) Phan Thanh Hùng	(Argentina) Gonzalo Marrkonle	Kappa	T&T Group
Hải Phòng	(Vietnam) Trương Việt Hoàng	(Vietnam) Nguyễn Minh Châu		
Hoàng Anh Gia Lai	(Vietnam) Nguyễn Quốc Tuấn	(Vietnam) Lương Xuân Trường		NutiFood
QNK Quảng Nam	(Vietnam) Hoàng Văn Phúc	(Vietnam) Đinh Thanh Trung		
Sanna Khánh Hòa BVN	(Vietnam) Võ Đình Tân	(Vietnam) Trần Văn Vũ		
SHB Đà Nẵng	(Vietnam) Lê Huỳnh Đức	(Vietnam) Nguyễn Vũ Phong		SHB
Sông Lam Nghệ An	(Vietnam) Ngô Quang Trường	(Vietnam) Nguyễn Minh Đức		Bắc Á Bank
Than Quảng Ninh	(Vietnam) Phạm Như Thuần	(Vietnam) Vũ Minh Tuấn		
FLC Thanh Hóa	(Vietnam) Hoàng Thanh Tùng	(Vietnam) Lê Đức Tuấn		Viettel
XSKT Cần Thơ	(Vietnam) Nguyễn Thanh Danh	(Vietnam) Nguyễn Thế Anh		Xổ số kiến thiết Cần Thơ

=== Managerial changes ===
Team	Outgoing manager	Manner of departure	Date of vacancy	Position in table	Incoming manager	Date of appointment
QNK Quảng Nam	(Vietnam) Vũ Quang Bảo	Resigned	27 August 2014	Pre-Season	(Vietnam) Hoàng Văn Phúc	2 September 2014
Sông Lam Nghệ An F.C.	(Vietnam) Nguyễn Hữu Thắng	Resigned	7 November 2014	Pre-Season	(Vietnam) Ngô Quang Trường	19 November 2014
Hải Phòng	(England) Dylan Kerr	Contract ended	26 August 2014	Pre-Season	(Vietnam) Trương Việt Hoàng	23 December 2014
Hoàng Anh Gia Lai F.C.	(South Korea) Choi Yun-Kyum	Sacked		Pre-Season	(France) Guillaume Graechen	
FLC Thanh Hóa F.C.	(Vietnam) Hoàng Thanh Tùng	Interim		Pre-Season	(Vietnam) Vũ Quang Bảo	
XSKT Cần Thơ	(Vietnam) Nguyễn Văn Sỹ	Sacked	3 March 2015	13th	(Vietnam) Nguyễn Thanh Danh	3 March 2015
Thanh Hóa	(Vietnam) Vũ Quang Bảo	Resigned	3 April 2015	2nd	(Vietnam) Hoàng Thanh Tùng	6 April 2015
Than Quảng Ninh F.C.	(Vietnam) Đinh Cao Nghĩa	Resigned	12 July 2015	6th	(Vietnam) Phạm Như Thuần	7 August 2015
Hoàng Anh Gia Lai F.C.	(France) Guillaume Graechen	Sacked	16 August 2015	14th	(Vietnam) Nguyễn Quốc Tuấn	16 August 2015

=== Foreign players ===
V.League teams are allowed to use two foreign players and one naturalised player

Club	Player 1	Player 2	Player 3	Naturalised Vietnamese Player	Former Players^{1}
Becamex Bình Dương	(Uganda) Moses Oloya	(Senegal) Cheikh Abass Dieng	(Croatia) Marko Šimić	(Nigeria) → (Vietnam) Nguyễn Quốc Thiện Esele	(Nigeria) Oseni Ganiyu Bolaji
Đồng Nai	(Cameroon) Nsi Amougou	(Uganda) Kisekka Henry		(Cameroon) → (Vietnam) Nguyễn Hằng Tcheuko Minh	(Nigeria) Peter Omoduemuke (Brazil) → (Vietnam) Huỳnh Kesley Alves
Đồng Tâm Long An	(Mali) Souleymane Diabate	(Brazil) Rafael			
Đồng Tháp	(Nigeria) Felix Ajala	(Nigeria) Samson Kpenosen			(Cameroon) → (Vietnam) Nguyễn Hằng Tcheuko Minh
Hà Nội T&T	(Argentina) Gonzalo Marrkonle	(Argentina) Víctor Ormazábal	(France) Antoine Goulard	(Nigeria) → (Vietnam) Hoàng Vũ Samson	(Trinidad and Tobago) Hughtun Hector (Trinidad and Tobago) Daneil Cyrus
Hải Phòng	(Jamaica) Diego Fagan	(Jamaica) Errol Stevens		(Ghana) → (Vietnam) Lê Văn Phú	
Hoàng Anh Gia Lai	(Central African Republic) Franklin Clovis Anzité	(Ivory Coast) Moussa Sanogo			(Sweden) Darko Lukanović (Slovenia) Mitja Mörec
QNK Quảng Nam	(Democratic Republic of the Congo) Tambwe Patiyo	(Nigeria) Suleiman Oladoja		(Nigeria) → (Vietnam) Hoàng Vissai	(Uganda) Kisekka Henry
Sanna Khánh Hòa	(Brazil) Tales dos Santos	(Nigeria) Uche Iheruome		(Brazil) → (Vietnam) Huỳnh Kesley Alves	
SHB Đà Nẵng	(Cuba) Yaikel Pérez	(Jamaica) Sean Fraser			(Spain) Candelario Gomez (Serbia) Anto Pejić
Sông Lam Nghệ An	(Ivory Coast) Baba Ouattara	(Nigeria) Haruna Abdul			(Netherlands) Koen Bosma (Ghana) Aboubakar Mahadi
Than Quảng Ninh	(Uganda) Geoffrey Kizito	(Spain) Candelario Gomez		(Nigeria) → (Vietnam) Đinh Hoàng Max	(Brazil) Jhonatan Bernardo
Thanh Hóa	(Senegal) Pape Omar Faye	(Netherlands) Danny van Bakel		(Ghana) → (Vietnam) Lê Văn Tân	(Nigeria) Timothy Anjembe
XSKT Cần Thơ	(Nigeria) Akanni-Sunday Wasiu	(Nigeria) Oseni Ganiyu Bolaji		(Kenya) → (Vietnam) Nguyễn Rodgers	(Brazil) Luiz Henrique (Croatia) Adrian Valentić

- ^1 Players who left their clubs after first half of the season.

== League table ==
Pos	Team	Pld	W	D	L	GF	GA	GD	Pts	Qualification or relegation
1	Becamex Bình Dương	26	16	4	6	57	33	+24	52	Qualification for the Mekong Club Championship; AFC Champions League group stage
2	Hà Nội	26	13	7	6	51	30	+21	46	Qualification for the AFC Champions League preliminary round 2
3	FLC Thanh Hóa	26	13	5	8	42	44	−2	44	
4	Than Quảng Ninh	26	13	3	10	39	31	+8	42	
5	Sanna Khánh Hòa	26	12	6	8	35	35	0	42	
6	Hải Phòng	26	11	8	7	31	28	+3	41	
7	Sông Lam Nghệ An	26	10	7	9	36	33	+3	37	
8	QNK Quảng Nam	26	9	9	8	49	39	+10	36	
9	SHB Đà Nẵng	26	10	6	10	42	32	+10	36	
10	Đồng Tâm Long An	26	8	9	9	39	42	−3	33	
11	XSKT Cần Thơ	26	6	7	13	32	52	−20	25	
12	Đồng Tháp	26	7	3	16	34	54	−20	24	
13	Hoàng Anh Gia Lai	26	6	6	14	33	50	−17	24	
14	Đồng Nai	26	5	6	15	35	52	−17	21	Relegation to V.League 2

Updated to match(es) played on 20 September 2015. Source: Vietnam Professional Football
Rules for classification: 1) Points; 2) Head to head; 3) Goal difference; 4) Number of goals scored

=== Positions by round ===
Team ╲ Round	1	2	3	4	5	6	7	8	9	10	11	12	13	14	15	16	17	18	19	20	21	22	23	24	25	26
Becamex Bình Dương	1	1	1	1	2	1	1	1	1	1	1	1	1	1	1	2	2	1	1	1	1	1	1	1	1	1
XSKT Cần Thơ	9	10	11	13	13	14	13	13	13	14	14	14	14	13	12	12	13	12	12	12	13	12	12	13	13	11
SHB Đà Nẵng	10	13	13	14	14	12	12	12	11	8	8	8	8	9	9	9	9	9	9	9	9	9	8	8	9	9
Đồng Nai	11	14	14	12	12	13	14	14	14	13	13	13	13	14	14	14	14	14	13	13	12	13	14	14	14	14
Đồng Tháp	14	12	9	9	11	9	10	9	10	12	12	10	11	10	10	11	11	10	10	11	10	10	11	12	12	12
Đồng Tâm Long An	7	3	6	6	5	4	4	5	3	6	6	4	6	3	5	6	5	7	4	6	8	8	9	9	10	10
Hà Nội	8	4	5	5	7	6	8	8	8	9	9	9	9	8	8	8	8	5	5	4	5	4	3	3	2	2
Hải Phòng	2	2	2	2	1	3	3	4	6	5	5	7	4	5	3	3	3	3	3	3	3	5	6	6	4	6
Hoàng Anh Gia Lai	3	5	10	10	8	10	11	10	12	11	11	12	12	12	13	13	12	13	14	14	14	14	13	11	11	13
Sanna Khánh Hòa	12	7	7	7	9	8	7	7	7	7	7	5	7	7	7	7	6	4	6	5	4	3	4	5	6	5
Sông Lam Nghệ An	13	9	8	8	10	7	6	6	4	2	2	3	5	6	4	5	4	6	8	8	7	7	7	7	7	7
QNK Quảng Nam	8	11	12	11	6	11	9	11	9	10	10	11	10	11	11	10	10	11	11	10	11	11	10	10	8	8
Than Quảng Ninh	4	6	3	3	3	2	2	2	5	3	3	6	3	4	6	4	7	8	7	7	6	6	5	4	5	4
Thanh Hóa	5	8	4	4	4	5	5	3	2	4	4	2	2	2	2	1	1	2	2	2	2	2	2	2	3	3

Updated to match(es) played on 20 September 2015. Source: Vietnam Professional Football

== Result ==
=== Summary ===
Home \ Away	BBD	ĐNA	ĐLA	ĐTH	HNT	HAI	HGL	QNK	SKH	SDN	SNA	THO	CTH	TQN
Becamex Bình Dương		2–1	3–1	6–1	1–0	3–1	4–1	1–3	1–2	3–2	1–1	5–2	4–1	1–2
Đồng Nai	1–2		0–0	0–4	0–0	1–1	1–2	3–1	1–0	1–2	1–1	5–2	1–0	0–2
Đồng Tâm Long An	3–1	4–4		3–0	1–3	1–0	2–1	4–3	2–0	0–0	1–1	2–1	1–2	0–1
Đồng Tháp	2–4	4–1	1–1		1–2	1–2	1–0	1–0	1–0	2–4	2–2	2–0	1–1	0–0
Hà Nội	2–2	2–0	1–1	7–0		1–1	4–3	4–4	3–0	2–0	1–0	4–1	4–1	1–0
Hải Phòng	0–0	2–1	1–1	2–1	1–2		1–0	1–0	1–0	2–0	2–2	2–0	4–2	0–0
Hoàng Anh Gia Lai	2–1	2–2	0–0	2–2	3–2	1–1		2–2	4–2	1–0	3–1	1–2	1–1	1–2
QNK Quảng Nam	2–4	3–1	2–2	2–0	2–2	5–0	4–0		4–1	2–1	0–1	0–0	0–0	2–0
Sanna Khánh Hòa	1–0	2–1	0–0	2–1	1–0	0–0	3–1	1–0		2–1	2–2	2–3	4–0	0–5
SHB Đà Nẵng	0–2	2–1	7–3	3–1	1–1	2–0	2–0	1–1	1–1		1–2	0–0	3–1	2–0
Sông Lam Nghệ An	0–1	1–2	2–1	1–0	2–0	0–3	2–0	3–2	0–1	1–1		4–0	2–2	3–1
FLC Thanh Hóa	1–1	3–2	4–3	1–0	2–1	0–1	2–1	3–4	1–1	2–1	2–1		2–0	3–1
XSKT Cần Thơ	1–3	4–3	0–1	1–1	1–3	2–1	3–1	0–0	0–3	0–5	3–0	1–1		2–3
Than Quảng Ninh	0–1	4–1	3–1	3–1	0–1	2–1	3–0	1–1	3–3	1–0	1–0	0–1	0–3	

Source: Vietnam Professional Football
Legend: Blue = home team win; Yellow = draw; Red = away team win.

== Season statistic ==
As of 21 September 2015

=== Top scorers ===
Rank	Player	Club	Goals
1	(Democratic Republic of the Congo) Tambwe Patiyo	QNK Quảng Nam	18
2	(Vietnam) Lê Văn Thắng	XSKT Cần Thơ	16
3	(Vietnam) Hoàng Vũ Samson	Hà Nội T&T	15
4	(Cameroon) Christian Nsi Amougou	Đồng Nai	14
4	(Mali) Souleymane Diabate	Đồng Tâm Long An	14
5	(Vietnam) Hoàng Đình Tùng	FLC Thanh Hóa	13
5	(Vietnam) Nguyễn Văn Quyết	Hà Nội T&T	13
5	(Jamaica) Errol Anthony Stevens	Hải Phòng	13
6	(Nigeria) Samson Kpenosen	Đồng Tháp	12
6	(Nigeria) Iheroume Uche	Sanna Khánh Hòa	12

=== Own goals ===
Player	Club	Against	Round
(Vietnam) Nguyễn Thành Trung	Đồng Nai	Đồng Tháp	3
(Vietnam) Lê Đức Tuấn	Thanh Hóa	Sông Lam Nghệ An	6
(Vietnam) Lê Đức Tuấn	Thanh Hóa	Becamex Bình Dương	10
(Vietnam) Lê Đức Tuấn	Thanh Hóa	Đồng Nai	21
(Vietnam) Vũ Ngọc Thịnh	Hải Phòng	Becamex Bình Dương	11
(Vietnam) Trần Quốc Anh	Đồng Tháp	Hà Nội T&T	16
(Vietnam) Nguyễn Thế Dương	FLC Thanh Hóa	Đồng Tâm Long An	17
(Argentina) Gonzalo Marrkonle	Hà Nội T&T	Hoàng Anh Gia Lai	24

=== Hattrick ===
Player	For	Against	Result	Date
(Vietnam) Hoàng Vũ Samson	Hà Nội T&T	QNK Quảng Nam	4–4	17 January 2015
(Vietnam) Lê Văn Thắng	XSKT Cần Thơ	Hoàng Anh Gia Lai	3–1	7 February 2015
(Vietnam) Hoàng Đình Tùng	Thanh Hóa	Đồng Tháp	3–1	12 April 2015
(Vietnam) Nguyễn Văn Quyết	Hà Nội T&T	Đồng Tháp	7–0	15 July 2015
(Cuba) Yaikel Pérez	SHB Đà Nẵng	Đồng Tâm Long An	7–3	15 August 2015
(Mali) Souleymane Diabate	Đồng Tâm Long An	SHB Đà Nẵng	3–7	15 August 2015
(Vietnam) Đinh Thanh Trung	QNK Quảng Nam	Hải Phòng	5–0	28 August 2015
(Vietnam) Nghiêm Xuân Tú	Than Quảng Ninh	Sanna Khánh Hòa	5–0	1 September 2015

== Awards ==
=== Monthly awards ===
Month	Club of the Month	Coach of the Month		Player of the Month	
Month	Club of the Month	Coach	Club	Player	Club
January	Than Quảng Ninh	(Vietnam) Trương Việt Hoàng	Hải Phòng	(Vietnam) Nguyễn Quang Hải	Than Quảng Ninh
February	No award				
March	No award				
April	Sông Lam Nghệ An	(Vietnam) Ngô Quang Trường	Sông Lam Nghệ An	(Vietnam) Trần Phi Sơn	Sông Lam Nghệ An
May	No award				
June	No award				
July	Hà Nội T&T	(Vietnam) Phan Thanh Hùng	Hà Nội T&T	(Vietnam) Nguyễn Văn Quyết	Hà Nội T&T
August	Becamex Bình Dương	(Vietnam) Nguyễn Thanh Sơn	Becamex Bình Dương	(Vietnam) Nguyễn Anh Đức	Becamex Bình Dương
September					

=== Annual awards ===
==== Individual ====
Award	Recipient	Club	Notes
Most Valuable Player	(Vietnam) Nguyễn Anh Đức	Becamex Bình Dương	
Young Player of the Year	(Vietnam) Đỗ Duy Mạnh	Hà Nội T&T	
Manager of the Year	(Vietnam) Phan Thanh Hùng	Hà Nội T&T	
Top scorer	(Democratic Republic of the Congo) Tambwe Patiyo	QNK Quảng Nam	18 goals
Goal of the Season	(Vietnam) Lê Quốc Phương	FLC Thanh Hóa	
Best Referee	Võ Minh Trí		
Best Assistant Referee	Nguyễn Trung Hậu		

==== Team of the Year ====
Goalkeepers	Defenders	Midfielders	Forwards
(Vietnam) Huỳnh Tuấn Linh (Than Quảng Ninh)	(Vietnam) Nguyễn Xuân Thành (Becamex Bình Dương) (Vietnam) Lê Đức Tuấn (FLC Thanh Hóa) (Netherlands) Danny van Bakel (FLC Thanh Hóa) (Vietnam) Hoàng Vissai (QNK Quảng Nam)	(Vietnam) Nguyễn Văn Quyết (Hà Nội F.C) (Uganda) Moses Oloya (Becamex Bình Dương) (Vietnam) Đinh Thanh Trung (QNK Quảng Nam) (Vietnam) Phạm Thành Lương (Hà Nội F.C)	(Vietnam) Hoàng Đình Tùng (FLC Thanh Hóa)) (Vietnam) Nguyễn Anh Đức (Becamex Bình Dương)

==== Team ====
Award	Recipient	Notes
Fair Play	Becamex Bình Dương	
Best Organizer	Than Quảng Ninh	
Best Young Training	Hoàng Anh Gia Lai	
Best Fan Club	Than Quảng Ninh	
Best Field	Becamex Bình Dương	

== Attendances ==
As of 22 September 2015

=== By club ===
Pos	Team	Total	High	Low	Average	Change
1	Hoàng Anh Gia Lai	129,000	13,000	7,500	9,923	n/a
2	Than Quảng Ninh	116,500	12,000	7,000	8,961	n/a
3	Becamex Bình Dương	113,500	18,000	3,000	8,730	n/a
4	SHB Đà Nẵng	109,000	25,000	3,000	8,384	n/a
5	Hải Phòng	108,500	20,000	5,000	8,346	n/a
6	Đồng Tháp	104,500	13,000	4,000	8,038	n/a
7	Thanh Hóa	102,000	13,000	4,000	7,846	n/a
8	Đồng Nai	98,000	25,000	3,000	7,538	n/a
9	Sông Lam Nghệ An	93,500	20,000	2,000	7,153	n/a
10	Đồng Tâm Long An	84,500	15,000	3,000	6,500	n/a
11	Sanna Khanh Hoa BVN	84,000	10,000	4,500	6,461	n/a
12	QNK Quảng Nam	79,500	15,000	3,000	6,115	n/a
13	Hà Nội T&T	66,500	15,000	1,500	5,115	n/a
14	XSKT Cần Thơ	47,000	12,000	1,000	3,615	n/a
	League total	1,346,500	25,000	1,000	7,400	n/a

Updated to games played on 22 September 2015
Source: Vietnam Professional Football

=== By round ===
2015 V.League 1 Attendance
Round	Total	Games	Avg. Per Game
Round 1	53,500	7	7,643
Round 2	68,000	7	9,714
Round 3	47,000	7	6,714
Round 4	56,000	7	8,000
Round 5	60,000	7	8,571
Round 6	43,500	7	6,214
Round 7	64,000	7	9,143
Round 8	49,000	7	7,000
Round 9	56,000	7	8,000
Round 10	52,000	7	7,428
Round 11	56,000	7	8,000
Round 12	56,000	7	8,000
Round 13	53,500	7	7,642
Round 14	48,500	7	6,928
Round 15	48,000	7	6,857
Round 16	50,500	7	7,214
Round 17	36,500	7	5,214
Round 18	54,000	7	7,714
Round 19	56,000	7	8,000
Round 20	45,000	7	6,428
Round 21	64,000	7	9,142
Round 22	47,000	7	6,714
Round 23	61,500	7	8,785
Round 24	37,000	7	5,285
Round 25	34,500	7	4,928
Round 26	42,500	7	6,071
Total	1,346,500	182	7,400
