= Richartz =

Richartz is a German language surname. It stems from the male given name Richard – and may refer to:

- Éder Richartz (1981), retired Brazilian footballer
- Johann Heinrich Richartz (1796–1861), German businessman and patron of the arts
- Willy Richartz (1900–1972), German composer and conductor
