= Johnny Nguyen =

Johnny Nguyen may refer to:

- Johnny Nguyen (footballer) (born 1986), French footballer
- Johnny Nguyen (weightlifter) (born 1975), Australian former weightlifter
- Johnny Trí Nguyễn (born 1974), Vietnamese–American actor, martial artist, action choreographer and stuntman
