= Mnguni (surname) =

Mnguni is a South African surname. Notable people with the surname include:

- Bennett Mnguni (born 1974), South African footballer
- Jabulani Mnguni (born 1972), South African footballer
- Themba Mnguni (born 1973), South African footballer
