= Udofia =

Udofia is a surname. Notable people with the surname include:

- Aniekan Udofia (born 1976), Nigerian artist
- Anthony Udofia, Nigerian politician
- Chris Udofia (born 1992), American basketball player
- Mfoniso Udofia, Nigerian-American storyteller
