= Lê Trung Vinh =

American soccer player

Personal information
- Full name: Lê Trung Vinh
- Date of birth: January 27, 2003 (age 23)
- Place of birth: Chicago, Illinois, United States
- Height: 1.78 m (5 ft 10 in)
- Position: Winger

Team information
- Current team: Ho Chi Minh City
- Number: 14

Youth career
- 2013–2014: Chicago Fire
- 2014–2018: Chicago Magic
- 2018–2021: Barca Residency Academy
- 2021–2022: Houston FC

College career
Years	Team	Apps	(Gls)
2022–2023	St. Thomas Celts	10	(0)

Senior career*
Years	Team	Apps	(Gls)
2023–2024	Ho Chi Minh City	0	(0)
2023	→ Ba Ria Vung Tau (loan)	6	(2)
2024–	Dong Thap FC	0	(0)
- * Club domestic league appearances and goals

Lê Trung Vinh (born January 27, 2003) is an American soccer player who plays as a winger for V.League 2 club Đồng Tháp.

== Career ==
=== Ho Chi Minh City ===
On March 1, 2023, Vinh signed for Vietnamese side Ho Chi Minh City FC. In October 2023, he completed his Vietnamese naturalization and was registered by his team as a local player.

==== Loan to Ba Ria Vung Tau ====
On June 13, 2023, Vinh joined Ba Ria Vung Tau FC on loan for the remainder of the 2023 season. On July 14, he scored a brace in a 4–2 loss against Long An.

== Career statistics ==
Club	Season	League			Cup		Other		Total	
Club	Season	Division	Apps	Goals	Apps	Goals	Apps	Goals	Apps	Goals
Ho Chi Minh City	2023	V.League 1	0	0	0	0	0	0	0	0
Ho Chi Minh City	2023–24	V.League 1	0	0	0	0	0	0	0	0
Ho Chi Minh City	Total		0	0	0	0	0	0	0	0
Ba Ria-Vung Tau (loan)	2023	V.League 2	6	2	1	0	0	0	7	2
Dong Thap	2024–25	V.League 2	0	0	0	0	0	0	0	0
Total			6	2	1	0	0	0	7	2
