= Võ Nhật Tân =

Vietnamese footballer

Personal information
- Full name: Võ Nhật Tân
- Date of birth: 27 June 1987 (age 39)
- Place of birth: Gò Công Tây, Tiền Giang, Vietnam
- Height: 1.68 m (5 ft 6 in)
- Position: Defender

Youth career
- 2001–2010: Đồng Tâm Long An

Senior career*
Years	Team	Apps	(Gls)
2011–2016	Long An	108	(0)
2017–2020	SHB Đà Nẵng	78	(0)
2021–2023	Long An	21	(1)
2023–2024	Trường Tươi Bình Phước	10	(0)
2024–2025	Đồng Tháp	16	(0)
- * Club domestic league appearances and goals as of 7 July 2021

Võ Nhật Tân (born 27 June 1987) is a former Vietnamese professional footballer who last played as a defender for V.League 2 club Đồng Tháp.
