= Jeferson Farias Valentim =

Brazilian footballer (born 1982)

Jeferson Farias Valentim Nguyễn Trung Sơn
Personal information
- Full name: Marcos Jeferson Farias Valentim
- Date of birth: 29 January 1982 (age 44)
- Place of birth: Brazil
- Position: Midfielder

Senior career*
Years	Team	Apps	(Gls)
2005	União Rondonópolis		
2006	Vila Aurora		
2007	SHB Da Nang		
2008–2009	Quang Nam FC		
2011–2013	Becamex Binh Duong	31	(0)
2014	Quang Nam FC	20	(1)
2015	Dong Thap FC	25	(0)
- * Club domestic league appearances and goals

Marcos Jeferson Farias Valentim (born 29 January 1982), also known as Nguyễn Trung Sơn, is a Brazilian former footballer who played as a midfielder.

== Career ==
Valentim played for Brazilian side União Rondonópolis in 2005 before signing for Brazilian side Vila Aurora in 2006. One year later, he signed for Vietnamese side SHB Da Nang. In 2008, he signed for Vietnamese side Quang Nam FC. Two years later, he signed for Vietnamese side Becamex Binh Duong.

Subsequently, he signed for Vietnamese side Quang Nam FC, where he made twenty league appearances and scored zero goals. Following his stint there, he signed for Vietnamese side Dong Thap FC, where he made twenty-five league appearances and scored zero goals.

== Personal life ==
Valentim was born and raised in Brazil, where he had a wife and children. He later became a naturalized Vietnamese citizen and married a Vietnamese woman. After retiring from professional football, he worked at a hotel in Brazil.
