= 2014 V.League 2 =

V.League 2
- Season: 2014
- Dates: 15 March – 28 June
- Champions: TDCS Đồng Tháp
- Relegated: XM Fico Tây Ninh
- Matches played: 56
- Goals scored: 139 (2.48 per match)
- Biggest home win: TDCS Đồng Tháp 5-0 XSKT Cần Thơ (19 Apr., 2014)
- Biggest away win: TP.Hồ Chí Minh 0-3 Sanna Khánh Hòa (19 Apr., 2014)
- Highest scoring: Sanna Khánh Hòa 4-3 Đắk Lắk (12 Apr., 2014) (7 goals); Đắk Lắk 5-2 Sanna Khánh Hòa (31 May 2014) (7 goals)
- Longest winning run: Sanna Khánh Hòa (3 matches)
- Longest unbeaten run: TDCS Đồng Tháp (7 matches)
- Longest winless run: XM Fico Tây Ninh (8 matches)
- Longest losing run: XSKT Cần Thơ (3 matches)
- All statistics correct as of 3 July 2014.

The 2014 V.League 2 (referred to as Kienlongbank V.League 2 for sponsorship reasons) is the 20th season of Vietnam's second tier professional football league, which began on 15 March 2014 and finished on 28 June 2014.

== Changes from last season ==
=== Team changes ===
The following teams have changed division since the 2013 season.

==== To V.League 2 ====
Promoted from Second Division

- Đắk Lắk
- TP.Hồ Chí Minh
- Huế
- Sanna Khánh Hòa
- XM Fico Tây Ninh

==== From V.League 2 ====
Relegated to Second Division

- TDC Bình Dương

Promoted to V.League 1

- Hùng Vương An Giang
- QNK Quảng Nam
- Than Quảng Ninh

Folded

- Bình Định

=== Rule changes ===
The Vietnam Football Federation passed a resolution on December 5 that allows the champion and runners-up of the 2014 campaign to gain promotion to the 2015 V.League 1. The resolution also called for only one club to face relegation to the 2015 Vietnamese Second Division.

Due to the match fixing scandal and withdrawal of Vissai Ninh Bình from the 2014 V.League 1, it was decided that the third-place club in the V.League 2 would face the twelfth-place of the V.League 1 in a play-off match for the right to play in the V.League 1 next season.

== Teams ==
Of the 8 participating teams, three remain following the 2013 V.League 2. They are joined by five teams promoted from the 2013 Vietnamese Second Division. No clubs from the 2013 V.League 1 were relegated. Bình Định failed to apply for the 2013 season by the application deadline.

== League table ==
Pos	Team	Pld	W	D	L	GF	GA	GD	Pts	Promotion or relegation
1	TDCS Đồng Tháp (C, P)	14	7	5	2	22	7	+15	26	2015 V.League 1
2	Sanna Khánh Hòa (P)	14	6	5	3	20	15	+5	23	2015 V.League 1
3	XSKT Cần Thơ (P)	14	6	3	5	21	23	−2	21	V.League 1 play-offs
4	Hà Nội	14	5	5	4	17	13	+4	20	
5	Huế	14	5	4	5	16	16	0	19	
6	Đắk Lắk	14	5	4	5	21	26	−5	19	
7	TP Hồ Chí Minh	14	3	4	7	11	19	−8	13	
8	XM Fico Tây Ninh (R)	14	1	6	7	12	21	−9	9	2015 Vietnamese Second Division

Updated to match(es) played on 28 June 2014. Source: Vietnam Professional Football
Rules for classification: 1) points; 2) goal difference; 3) number of goals scored.
(C) Champions; (P) Promoted; (R) Relegated

== Results ==
=== Summary ===
Home \ Away	ĐLK	HN	KH	ĐT	HUE	HCM	CT	TN
Đắk Lắk		3–2	5–2	0–0	3–2	0–0	0–0	2–1
Hà Nội	1–1		2–2	1–0	2–0	2–0	1–1	2–2
Sanna Khánh Hòa	4–3	1–0		1–1	0–0	1–0	2–0	2–0
TDCS Đồng Tháp	3–0	1–0	2–1		4–1	2–0	5–0	0–0
Huế	3–1	1–0	1–1	0–0		2–0	1–2	1–0
Thành phố Hồ Chí Minh	4–1	0–0	0–3	0–2	0–0		3–1	1–1
XSKT Cần Thơ	4–1	0–1	1–0	2–1	4–1	3–1		2–2
XM Fico Tây Ninh	0–1	1–3	0–0	1–1	1–3	1–2	2–1	

Updated to match(es) played on 28 June 2014. Source: Vietnam Professional Football
Legend: Blue = home team win; Yellow = draw; Red = away team win.

== Season statistics ==
=== Top scorers ===
As of 14 June 2014

Rank	Player	Club	Goals
1	(Vietnam) Huỳnh Văn Thanh	Sanna Khánh Hòa	9
2	(Nigeria) Samson Kpenosen	TĐCS Đồng Tháp	6
2	(Cameroon) Belibi Celstin Didier	XSKT Cần Thơ	6
4	(Mali) Souleymane Diabate	XSKT Cần Thơ	5
5	(Vietnam) Nguyễn Tuấn Hiệp	Huế	4
