= Nguyễn Minh Trung =

Vietnamese footballer (born 1992)

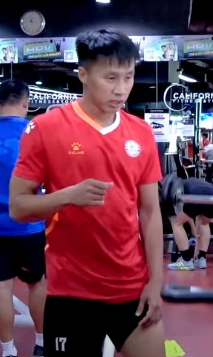
- Minh Trung in 2023

Personal information
- Birth name: Nguyễn Minh Trung
- Date of birth: 9 December 1992 (age 33)
- Place of birth: Ho Chi Minh City, Vietnam
- Height: 1.73 m (5 ft 8 in)
- Position: Midfielder

Team information
- Current team: Văn Hiến University
- Number: 17

Youth career
- 2007–2009: Thống Nhất
- 2011–2013: Hồ Chí Minh City

Senior career*
Years	Team	Apps	(Gls)
2013–2019	Hồ Chí Minh City	63	(9)
2020–2022	Sài Gòn	31	(0)
2023–2025	Hồ Chí Minh City	26	(0)
2025–	Văn Hiến University	16	(1)
- * Club domestic league appearances and goals as of 6 June 2026

Nguyễn Minh Trung (born 9 December 1992) is a Vietnamese professional footballer who plays as a midfielder for V.League 2 club Văn Hiến University.

== Career ==
Born in Ho Chi Minh City, Minh Trung started his career playing for the local amateur team Thống Nhất FC. In 2011, he was recruited to the Hồ Chí Minh City FC youth team. He was promoted to the senior team in 2013 and won a promotion to the 2014 V.League 2 with the team. In 2016, as a regular starter, he played a big role helping his team winning the 2016 V.League 2. In the following season, he made his V.League 1 debut with Hồ Chí Minh City.

In 2020, he joined Sài Gòn on a free transfer and was part of the team that finished third in the 2020 V.League 1, thus gaining a qualification for the 2021 AFC Cup. This was the first time the club appear in a continental competition.

In 2023, after Sài Gòn dissolved, Minh Trung made his return to Hồ Chí Minh City FC.

== Honours ==
Hồ Chí Minh City

- V.League 2: 2016
