= 1996 V-League =

Vietnam National Elite Football Championship
- Season: 1996
- Dates: 10 March – 6 October
- Champions: Đồng Tháp (2nd title)
- Relegated: Cần Thơ; Thừa Thiên Huế
- Asian Club Championship: Đồng Tháp
- Asian Cup Winners' Cup: Hải Quan
- Matches: 146
- Goals: 353 (2.42 per match)
- Top goalscorer: Lê Huỳnh Đức (25 goals)

The 1996 Vietnam National Elite Football Championship was the 14th season of the National Football Championship in Vietnam, played from 10 March until 6 October 1996.

== Standings ==
Pos	Team	Pld	W	D	L	GF	GA	GD	Pts	Qualification or relegation
1	Công An TP.HCM	22	11	5	6	48	25	+23	38	Final round and Dunhill Cup
2	Đồng Tháp	22	11	4	7	27	21	+6	37	Final round and Dunhill Cup
3	Sông Lam Nghệ An	22	11	3	8	31	25	+6	36	Final round and Dunhill Cup
4	Lâm Đồng	22	10	4	8	31	29	+2	34	Final round and Dunhill Cup
5	An Giang	22	10	4	8	29	29	0	34	Final round and Dunhill Cup
6	Khánh Hòa	22	8	8	6	20	22	−2	32	Final round and Dunhill Cup
7	Hải Quan	22	9	3	10	27	34	−7	30	Dunhill Cup
8	Cảng Sài Gòn	22	8	6	8	19	19	0	30	Dunhill Cup
9	Công An Hà Nội	22	7	6	9	27	25	+2	27	
10	Quân Đội	22	6	8	8	21	30	−9	26	
11	Thừa Thiên Huế	22	3	9	10	20	33	−13	18	Relegated
12	Cần Thơ	22	2	12	8	19	27	−8	18	Relegated

Source: VFF

== Final round ==
=== Group A ===
Pos	Team	Pld	W	D	L	GF	GA	GD	Pts	Qualification or relegation
1	Công An TP.HCM	4	3	0	1	11	7	+4	9	Final
2	Sông Lam Nghệ An	4	2	1	1	7	6	+1	7	Third place match
3	An Giang	4	0	1	3	5	10	−5	1	

Source: VFF

=== Group B ===
Pos	Team	Pld	W	D	L	GF	GA	GD	Pts	Qualification or relegation
1	Đồng Tháp	4	2	2	0	5	3	+2	8	Final
2	Khánh Hòa	4	1	1	2	6	6	0	4	Third place match
3	Lâm Đồng	4	1	1	2	6	8	−2	4	

Source: VFF

=== Third place match ===
6 October 1996

Sông Lam Nghệ An	0–0	Lâm Đồng
Penalties
	4–3

Nha Trang Stadium, Khánh Hòa

=== Final ===
6 October 1996

Công An TP.HCM	1–3	Đồng Tháp
Lê Huỳnh Đức 6'		Ngô Công Nhậm 55'; Nguyễn Văn Hùng 70'; Phạm Anh Tuấn 90+2'

Cao Lãnh Stadium, Đồng Tháp
Attendance: 30,000
Referee: Nguyễn Tuấn Hùng

Vietnam National Elite Football Championship
Champions

2nd title
