= Nguyễn Rodgers =

Kenyan footballer (born 1981)

Rodgers Omunsulah Nandwa Nguyễn Rodgers
Personal information
- Full name: Rodgers Omunsulah Nandwa
- Date of birth: 3 October 1981 (age 45)
- Place of birth: Kitale, Kenya
- Height: 1.87 m (6 ft 2 in)
- Positions: Midfielder; defensive midfielder

Youth career
- 1994–1996: St. Anthony's High School

Senior career*
Years	Team	Apps	(Gls)
1997–2000	Kitale	34	(9)
2000–2009	Nzoia Sugar	43	(19)
2010–2012	FLC Thanh Hóa	19	(0)
2013–2014	Đồng Nai	35	(1)
2015–2016	XSKT Cần Thơ	25	(2)
2016–2017	Becamex Bình Dương	4	(0)
- * Club domestic league appearances and goals

Rodgers Omunsulah Nandwa (born 3 October 1981) is a Kenyan former footballer who played as a midfielder.

== Early life and childhood ==
Growing up on a farm in Kenya, he played street football with his friends as a recreational activity.

Next, he milked livestock for a living and was sometimes allotted less than 300 dollars a month. A dealer observed his physical vigor in a local match and offered him an opportunity to play his trade abroad in Vietnam. Immediately, he validly accepted the offer.

== Career ==
The Kenyan had a short stint in Uganda before heading to Vietnam which may be why he is labelled by some sources as Ugandan.

At first, Nguyen Rodgers pondered whether to leave Vietnam as he lacked rudimentary football skills, tactical knowledge and people were not impressed with his expertise. Then coach Tran Van Phuc persuaded him to stay and helped him develop his overall skills in football; he hit eight goals in his first season with Thanh Hoa. In the end he left Thanh Hoa the reason being knee cartilage issues. Transferred to Dong Nai F.C. in 2013. For a short amount of time he migrated to different areas in Vietnam as he was deprived of a job.

Netted his first goal for Can Tho on August 9 which was the 400th goal in the 2015 V.League 1; he also participated in all 21 rounds of the 2015 V.League 1.

Former outfit Thanh Hoa are planning to buy the player.

== Personal life ==
Becoming Vietnamese in 2011, he changed his name from Rodgers Omunsulah Nandwa to Nguyen Van Rodgers to suit his new nationality and was endowed the rights of citizenship.
