= Mladen Čučić =

Croatian footballer

Personal information
- Full name: Mladen Čučić
- Date of birth: 8 September 1983 (age 43)
- Place of birth: SFR Yugoslavia
- Height: 1.87 m (6 ft 1 1/2 in)
- Position: Goalkeeper

Youth career
- 1995–2000: Rijeka

Senior career*
Years	Team	Apps	(Gls)
2000–2002	Istra		
2002–2004	Koper	0	(0)
2004–2005	Grafičar Vodovod		
2005–2007	Lamia		
2007–2008	Kamen Ingrad		
2008–2009	Segesta		
2010–2011	Khatoco Khánh Hòa		
2012–2013	Foolad Yazd		
2013–2014	Crikvenica		
2014	Vinodol		
2015	Orijent 1919		
2015–2016	Vinogradar		
2016–2021	NK Borac Bakar		
- * Club domestic league appearances and goals as of 19 October 2010 ‡ National team caps and goals as of 16 November 2005

Mladen Čučić (born 8 September 1983) is a Croatian retired football goalkeeper.
