= Goran Gruica =

Croatian association football manager

Personal information
- Date of birth: 11 March 1986 (age 40)
- Place of birth: Split, SR Croatia, SFR Yugoslavia
- Position: Defender

Team information
- Current team: Al-Tai (assistant manager)

Youth career
- 2005: Hajduk Split

Senior career*
Years	Team	Apps	(Gls)
2005-2007	Mosor		
2007-2008	Šibenik	14	(0)
2008-2010	RNK Split		
2011	Zestaponi	0	(0)
2011-2012	Mosor		
2012-2013	Dugopolje	43	(1)
2014	Hanoi FC		
2014-2015	Dugopolje	28	(2)
2016-2017	Solin	31	(2)
2017	Hajduk Split II	17	(1)
2018	Solin	11	(0)
- * Club domestic league appearances and goals

Goran Gruica (born 11 March 1986) is a former Croatian footballer and a current assistant manager of Saudi Pro League side Al-Tai.

== Club career ==
He started his career at Hajduk youth school and recorded two appearances in friendly games for the team from Split.

After that, he joined NK Mosor from Žrnovica, where he became captain of the team that competed in the Croatian Second Football League, and good games enabled him to transfer to HNK Šibenik, which was then competing in the Croatian First Football League. He made 15 first-team appearances for the Šubićevac team, and in addition to playing football, he simultaneously pursued an academic career.

Due to law studies, he returned to his hometown of Split in 2008, where he performed for the RNK Split, with which he first played in the Croatian Second Football League and then in the First Division, and during that time he was an occasional captain and an important player of the team from the Stadion Park Mladeži.

In 2011, he went abroad for the first time to the Georgian FC Zestaponi to win the Erovnuli Liga, but immediately after winning the title, he returned to his homeland where he again competed for Mosor in the Second Division.

After a season in Mosor, he moved to NK Dugopolje where he again played in the second rank, and with good games came the captain's role. At the end of the season, he went abroad once again, this time to Vietnam and with the FC Hanoi he won the championship title.

At the end of his second foreign engagement, he returned to Dugopolje, where as a team captain he led the club in the fight for the holding of the Second Division status, and then for two seasons he played for NK Solin, and together with his teammates he transferred from the Croatian Third Football League to the Second Division.

Before the end of his career, he joined HNK Hajduk second team, coached by Siniša Oreščanin, where he had the status of a mentor to younger talented players, however, for family reasons in the last half-season he returned to Solin, where he ended his career.

== Post-playing career ==
After his playing career, he returned to Hajduk as an assistant in the academy and team manager of the second team, but after personnel changes and inner club fights, he left the club.

At the end of 2019, he took over as the sports director of NK Solin, the club where he left his biggest mark as a player. He left the position in 2021.

In July 2021 he took over the position of assistant manager of Damac FC.

== Private life ==
Gruica graduated from the Faculty of Law in Split and is a married father of two children.
