= Damián Andermatten =

Argentine footballer

Personal information
- Full name: Damíán Rogelio Andermatten
- Date of birth: 21 September 1979 (age 47)
- Place of birth: Rafaela, Argentina
- Height: 1.79 m (5 ft 10 in)
- Position: Midfielder

Senior career*
Years	Team	Apps	(Gls)
	Ben Hur	42+	(6+)
2005	LG Hanoi ACB		(4)
2005-2006	Ben Hur	12	(0)
2006	9 de Julio de Rafaela		
2007	Persibom		
2008-2009	9 de Julio de Rafaela		
2010	Gimnasia de Concepción del Uruguay	10	(0)
2010-2012	9 de Julio de Rafaela	7	(1)
	Club Sanjustino	38+	(2+)
- * Club domestic league appearances and goals

Damíán Rogelio Andermatten (born 21 September 1979) is an Argentine former footballer who is last known to have played as a midfielder for Club Sanjustino.

== Career ==
In 2000, Andermatten trialed for Dutch top flight side Groningen. After that, he played for LG Hanoi ACB in Vietnam.

In 2005, he signed for Argentine second division club Ben Hur, where he made 12 league appearances and scored 0 goals.

In 2008, Andermatten signed for 9 de Julio de Rafaela in the Argentine third division after playing for Indonesian team Persibom.

Before the 2010 season, he signed for Gimnasia de Concepción del Uruguay in the Argentine third division before returning to 9 de Julio de Rafaela.
