= Aniekan Ekpe =

Nigerian footballer (born 1986)

Personal information
- Full name: Aniekan Ekpe Okon
- Date of birth: 30 December 1986 (age 39)
- Place of birth: Nigeria
- Position: Midfielder

Senior career*
Years	Team	Apps	(Gls)
2006–2007	Bình Định		
2008	TPHCM		
2009	Đồng Tháp		
2010–2011	Hải Phòng	25	(2)
2012	Navibank Sài Gòn	22	(3)
2013	Bình Dương	19	(3)
2014–2020	Akwa United		(15)
- * Club domestic league appearances and goals

Aniekan Ekpe Okon (born 30 December 1986) is a Nigerian former footballer who played as a midfielder.

== Career ==
In 2006, Ekpe signed for Vietnamese side Bình Định. He was once regarded as one of the best defensive midfielders in the Vietnamese top flight.

== Style of play ==
Ekpe mainly operated as a midfielder. He was described as "stronger in defense and the ability to regulate the pace of the match".

== Personal life ==
Ekpe was born in 1986 in Nigeria. He was offered Vietnamese citizenship.
