= Rodrigo Basualdo =

Argentine footballer (born 1993)

Personal information
- Full name: Rodrigo Fernando Basualdo
- Date of birth: 12 March 1993 (age 33)
- Place of birth: Merlo, Argentina
- Height: 1.76 m (5 ft 9 in)
- Position: Midfielder

Team information
- Current team: Argentino de Merlo

Senior career*
Years	Team	Apps	(Gls)
2013–2017	Deportivo Morón	20	(0)
2015	→ Ferrocarril Midland (loan)	34	(1)
2017–2019	Defensores Unidos	47	(0)
2019–	Argentino de Merlo	6	(0)
- * Club domestic league appearances and goals as of 22:45, 12 February 2020 (UTC)

Rodrigo Fernando Basualdo (born 12 March 1993) is an Argentine professional footballer who plays as a midfielder for Argentino de Merlo.

== Career ==
Deportivo Morón gave Basualdo his start in senior football, with manager Mario Grana selecting him for his professional debut on 12 April 2013 versus Central Córdoba in Primera B Metropolitana. Further appearances against Almagro, Atlanta, Temperley and Comunicaciones arrived in the 2012–13 campaign. In 2015, after nine more games for the club, Basualdo departed on loan to Primera C Metropolitana's Ferrocarril Midland. One goal in thirty-five fixtures followed. Deportivo Morón won the league title alongside promotion to Primera B Nacional in 2016–17, though the midfielder did not play a single minute.

On 8 August 2017, Basualdo signed for Defensores Unidos of Primera C Metropolitana. He participated in twenty-seven fixtures in his first season, which concluded with promotion as division champions to Primera B Metropolitana. His first appearance at that level for the club arrived in August versus UAI Urquiza.

== Career statistics ==
As of 17 May 2019.

Appearances and goals by club, season and competition
Club	Season	League			Cup		League Cup		Continental		Other		Total	
Club	Season	Division	Apps	Goals	Apps	Goals	Apps	Goals	Apps	Goals	Apps	Goals	Apps	Goals
Deportivo Morón	2012–13	Primera B Metropolitana	5	0	0	0	—		—		0	0	5	0
Deportivo Morón	2013–14	Primera B Metropolitana	7	0	0	0	—		—		0	0	7	0
Deportivo Morón	2014	Primera B Metropolitana	2	0	0	0	—		—		0	0	2	0
Deportivo Morón	2015	Primera B Metropolitana	0	0	0	0	—		—		0	0	0	0
Deportivo Morón	2016	Primera B Metropolitana	6	0	0	0	—		—		0	0	6	0
Deportivo Morón	2016–17	Primera B Metropolitana	0	0	1	0	—		—		0	0	1	0
Deportivo Morón	Total		20	0	1	0	—		—		0	0	21	0
Ferrocarril Midland (loan)	2015	Primera C Metropolitana	34	1	1	0	—		—		0	0	35	1
Defensores Unidos	2017–18	Primera C Metropolitana	27	0	0	0	—		—		0	0	27	0
Defensores Unidos	2018–19	Primera B Metropolitana	19	0	2	0	—		—		0	0	21	0
Defensores Unidos	Total		46	0	2	0	—		—		0	0	48	0
Career total			100	1	4	0	—		—		0	0	104	1

== Honours ==
Defensores Unidos

- Primera C Metropolitana: 2017–18
