= Hervé Din Din =

Cameroonian footballer

Personal information
- Date of birth: 17 April 1991 (age 35)
- Place of birth: Cameroon
- Position: Striker
- Song Lam Nghe An FC
2011	JS Kabylie	0	(0)
2011/12	US Monastir	2	(0)
2016	Tvøroyrar Bóltfelag	13	(0)

Hervé Din Din (Arabic: هيرفي دين دين; born 17 April 1991 in Cameroon) is a Cameroonian retired footballer.

== Career ==
After playing in the Cameroonian second division and the Vietnamese top flight, Din Din had an unsuccessful trial with Hungarian side Debreceni VSC. In 2011, he signed for JS Kabylie in Algeria as a springboard to Europe but his contract was soon terminated because foreign players had to have represented their nation at youth level. After that, Din Din joined Tunisian top flight club US Monastir, where he made 2 league appearances.

In 2016, he signed for Tvøroyrar Bóltfelag in the Faroe Islands.
