= Marko Kück =

German footballer

Personal information
- Date of birth: 14 September 1976 (age 50)
- Place of birth: Bremerhaven, Germany
- Height: 1.88 m (6 ft 2 in)
- Position: Defender

Youth career
- Hamburger SV

Senior career*
Years	Team	Apps	(Gls)
–1999	Hamburger SV	1	(0)
–1999	Hamburger SV II		
1999–2000	VfL Osnabrück	10	(0)
2000–2001	SV Wilhelmshaven	20+	(0+)
2003–2005	Rot-Weiss Essen	58	(3)
- 1. FC Eschborn
- VfL Oldenburg
- Viettel
2007–2008	Richmond	29	(1)
- * Club domestic league appearances and goals

Marko Kück (born 14 September 1976) is a German former professional footballer who played as a defender.

== Career ==
In 1999, Kück signed for VfL Osnabrück in the German third division from German Bundesliga side Hamburger SV.

In 2007, he signed for Richmond SC in the Australian second division.

He played in Vietnam for Hanoi-based club Viettel FC.
