= Mariusz Wysocki =

Polish footballer (born 1976)

Personal information
- Date of birth: 3 June 1976 (age 50)
- Place of birth: Brodnica, Poland
- Height: 1.94 m (6 ft 4 in)
- Position: Defender

Senior career*
Years	Team	Apps	(Gls)
–1998	Amica Wronki	0	(0)
1998–1999	Sparta Brodnica		
1999–2000	MKS Mława		
2000–2001	Stomil Olsztyn	4	(0)
2001	Dolcan Ząbki		
2001–2003	Quang Nam-Da Nang		
2004	MKS Mława		
2004–2005	Świt NDM	26	(0)
2005–2006	KSZO Ostrowiec	26	(2)
2006–2008	Mieszko Gniezno	14+	(0+)
2008–2009	Promień Opalenica	14+	(1+)
2009–2011	Grom Plewiska		
- * Club domestic league appearances and goals

Mariusz Wysocki (born 3 June 1976) is a Polish former professional footballer who played as a defender.
