= Samson Kpenosen =

Nigerian footballer

Personal information
- Full name: Samson Oritseweyinmi Kpenosen
- Date of birth: 4 February 1992 (age 34)
- Place of birth: Warri, Nigeria
- Height: 1.82 m (6 ft 0 in)
- Position: Forward

Youth career
- –2010: Warri Wolves

Senior career*
Years	Team	Apps	(Gls)
2010–2012	Warri Wolves		
2012–2013	Becamex Binh Duong		
2013	→ TDC Binh Duong (loan)	10	(8)
2014–2016	Dong Thap	43	(18)
2016	Hai Phong	0	(0)
- * Club domestic league appearances and goals

Samson Oritseweyinmi Kpenosen (born 4 February 1992) is a Nigerian former professional footballer who played as a forward.

== Career ==
Born in Warri on 4 February 1992, Kpenosen began his career at Becamex Binh Duong (BBD), where he was unable to establish himself, so he was demoted to TDC Bình Dương, from which he joined Dong Thap. After netting a brace in a 3–0 win over Quang Nam in the sixth matchday of the 2015 V.League 1 on 30 January, Kpenosen temporarily became the league's joint top scorer with five goals. At the end of the season, he was nominated to The Best Foreign Player.

In January 2016, Dong Thap extended his contract for one year with 26.000 USD. In March 2016, he scored in stoppage time to seal a 2–1 win over Hoang Anh Gia Lai.

However, during the season, he left the club in September to join Hai Phong. Unable to retain his place in Haiphong FC since they filled their foreign player slots with new transfers, the club was predisposed to send him on loan.
