= Benoit Tcheuko =

Cameroonian footballer

Personal information
- Full name: Benoit Elmouaak Tcheuko
- Date of birth: August 18, 1983 (age 43)
- Place of birth: Cameroon
- Position: Midfielder

Senior career*
| Years | Team | Apps | (Gls) |
| 2013 | Kiên Giang F.C. | 15 | (0) |
| 2015 | CLB Đồng Tháp | 11 | (0) |
| 2015 | CLB Đồng Nai | 13 | (2) |
| 2015–2016 | Sheikh Jamal Dhanmondi Club | | |
- * Club domestic league appearances and goals

Benoit Tcheuko Elmouaak (born 18 August 1983), also known as Nguyễn Hằng Tcheuko Minh, is a Cameroonian retired footballer.
