= Salia Ouattara =

Ivorian footballer (born 1990)

Personal information
- Date of birth: 24 April 1996 (age 30)
- Place of birth: Ivory Coast
- Height: 1.78 m (5 ft 10 in)
- Position: Forward

Team information
- Current team: Ashanti Gold
- Number: 32

Youth career
- 2006-2007: CFKA Lion Star de Koumassi
- 2006-2007: Edus D'Aboisso

Senior career*
Years	Team	Apps	(Gls)
2008-2010	Denguélé		
2010-2012	Africa Sports d'Abidjan		
2013–2014	BEC Tero Sasana	30	(20)
2014-2015	PTT Rayong	24	(5)
2015	Mladost Lučani	0	(0)
2015	Song Lam Nghe An	40	(10)
2017	Denguélé	20	(4)
2017	San Pédro	15	(2)
2018–	Ashanti Gold	12	(1)
- * Club domestic league appearances and goals as of 26 June 2019

Baba Salia Affoloh Ouattara (born 24 April 1990) is an Ivorian professional footballer who plays as a forward for Ashanti Gold.

== Club career ==
Ouattara played many years with AS Denguélé in the Ivory Coast Ligue 1. He moved abroad in 2013 and joined Royal Thai Navy F.C. playing in the Thai Division 1 League, Thailand's second level. In January 2015 he signed with Serbian side Mladost Lučani but made no appearance in the 2014–15 Serbian SuperLiga. In the following summer he returned to Asia this time by signing with Vietnamese side Song Lam Nghe An playing in the V.League 1.

In 2018 he joined Ghanaian Premier League side Ashanti Gold.
