= Éder Richartz =

Brazilian association football player

Personal information
- Date of birth: 7 October 1981 (age 45)
- Place of birth: Florianópolis, Brazil
- Height: 1.76 m (5 ft 9 1/2 in)
- Position: Midfielder

Youth career
- Avaí
- SERC Guarani
- Metropolitano

Senior career*
Years	Team	Apps	(Gls)
2003	Francisco Beltrão		
2004	Coritiba	0	(0)
2004–2006	Naval	39	(3)
2007	São Bento		
2007	ABC		
2008	Chapecoense		
2008	Noroeste		
2009	Confiança-SE		
2009–2010	Free State Stars	6	(1)
2011	SERC Guarani		
2011	River Plate-SE	0	(0)
2012	Hà Nội		
2013	Aimoré		
2014	Ypiranga-PE	0	(0)
2014–2015	Coruripe		
Total		45	(4)
- * Club domestic league appearances and goals

Éder Richartz (born 7 October 1981) is a retired Brazilian footballer.

== Career statistics ==
=== Club ===
Club	Season	League			Cup		Continental		Other		Total	
Club	Season	Division	Apps	Goals	Apps	Goals	Apps	Goals	Apps	Goals	Apps	Goals
Coritiba	2004	Série A	0	0	0	0	4 (Note: Appearances in the Copa Libertadores)	0	0	0	4	0
Naval	2004–05	Segunda Liga	28	3	2 (Note: Appearances in the Taça de Portugal)	1	–		0	0	30	4
Naval	2005–06	Primeira Liga	11	0	0	0	–		0	0	11	0
Naval	Total		39	3	2	1	0	0	0	0	41	4
Free State Stars	2009–10	Premier Soccer League	6	1	0	0	–		0	0	6	1
River Plate-SE	2011	Série D	0	0	2 (Note: Appearances in the Copa do Brasil)	0	–		0	0	2	0
Ypiranga-PE	2014	–			0	0	–		9 (Note: Appearances in the Campeonato Pernambucano)	1	9	1
Coruripe	2014	Série D	0	0	0	0	–		7 (Note: Appearances in the Campeonato Alagoano)	1	7	1
Career total			45	4	4	1	4	0	16	2	69	7
