= Jabulani Mnguni =

South African footballer (born 1972)

Personal information
- Date of birth: 9 December 1972 (age 53)
- Place of birth: South Africa
- Position: Midfielder

Senior career*
Years	Team	Apps	(Gls)
1997–1998	Vaal Professionals		
1998–1999	Moroka Swallows	17	(2)
1999–2001	Orlando Pirates	11	(1)
2001–2002	Tembisa Classic	1	(0)
2002–2003	Uthukela		
- Sasolburg Juventus
2005	Song Lam Nghe An		
Total		29+	(3+)

International career
1997	South Africa	2	(0)

Managerial career
- Sasolburg Juventus
- * Club domestic league appearances and goals

Jabulani Mnguni (born 9 December 1972) is a South African former soccer player who played as a midfielder.

== Club career ==
Mnguni played club football for Vaal Professionals, Moroka Swallows, Orlando Pirates, Tembisa Classic and Uthukela,

He then became a player-manager of amateur club Sasolburg Juventus, before moving to Vietnam to play with Song Lam Nghe An in January 2005. He was the firs South African footballer to play in Vietnam.

== International career ==
He earned 2 caps for the South African national side in 1997. He was a squad member at the 1997 FIFA Confederations Cup.
