= Miguel Ángel Basualdo =

Argentine footballer

Personal information
- Date of birth: 2 July 1979 (age 47)
- Place of birth: Argentina
- Height: 1.86 m (6 ft 1 in)
- Position: Forward

Senior career*
Years	Team	Apps	(Gls)
1999–2001	Coquimbo Unido	7	(0)
2002	Deportes Iquique		(2)
2003–2004	Lota Schwager		
2005–2006	General Paz Juniors	8	
2006	Basingstoke Town		
2006–2007	Bassano Romano		
2007	Pianese		
2007–2008	Colleferro		
2008–2009	Anziolavino		
2009	Huda Hue		
2009–2010	Luján de Cuyo	10	(1)
- * Club domestic league appearances and goals

Miguel Ángel Basualdo (born 2 July 1979) is an Argentine former footballer who played as a forward.

== Career ==
Basualdo played for Chilean clubs Coquimbo Unido, Deportes Iquique,

In Argentina, Basualdo played for General Paz Juniors and Luján de Cuyo.

In England, he played for Basingstoke Town.

In Italy, he played for clubs Bassano Romano, Colleferro Calcio and Anziolavino

In Vietnam, he played for club Huda Hue FC.
