= Johnny Nguyen (footballer) =

French footballer (born 1986)

Personal information
- Date of birth: January 27, 1986 (age 40)
- Place of birth: France
- Position: Midfielder

Senior career*
| Years | Team | Apps | (Gls) |
| –2004 | Lens B | | |
| 2004–2007 | Sedan B | | |
| 2007–2011 | Reims | 9 | (1) |
| 2007–2011 | → Reims B (loan) | 25 | (0) |
| 2012 | Hanoi T&T | 3 | (0) |
| 2012–2013 | Reims Sainte-Anne | 2 | (0) |
| 2015 | Blue Boys Muhlenbach | 8 | (0) |
- * Club domestic league appearances and goals

Johnny Nguyen (Vietnamese: Nguyễn Ngọc Anh; born 27 January 1986) is a retired French footballer who last played as a midfielder for Blue Boys Muhlenbach.

== Early life ==
Nguyen grew up in Reims, France. He started playing football at the age of six.

== Career ==
Nguyen started his career with French side RC Lens B. In 2004, he signed for French side CS Sedan B. In 2007, he signed for French side Stade de Reims. In 2012, he returned to Vietnam, his heritage country and signed for Hanoi T&T. After failure spell in Vietnam, he returned to France and joined EF Reims Sainte-Anne. In 2015, he signed for Luxembourgish club FC Blue Boys Muhlenbach.

== Style of play ==
Nguyen mainly operated as a midfielder. He is left-footed. He is known for his passing ability.

== Personal life ==
Nguyen is of Vietnamese descent. His Vietnamese name is Nguyễn Ngọc Anh.
