= Aniekan Udofia =

American portrait artist (born 1976)

- Born: 1976 (age 48–49); Nigeria
- Occupation: artist
- Known for: large-scale paintings and murals
- Website: aniekanudofia.com

Aniekan Udofia (born 1976) is a portrait artist who has created large-scale paintings and murals in the Washington, D.C. area. His art work, familiar to the community of northwest D.C., came to prominence after a mural tribute to American icon Duke Ellington. Udofia garnered national attention with his caricatures and photorealistic illustrations for publications such as XXL, Vibe, DC Pulse, and The Source.

Udofia's other works are huge murals of Frederick Douglass and George Washington. He has participated in solo and group live paintings at various D.C. events, which have been sponsored by companies like Red Bull, Heineken, Honda, Current TV, Timberland, and Adidas. In December 2011, Udofia and his works headlined a Visual Collaborative pop-up exhibition called Visual Grandeur. Udofia designed sports wear for companies like AND1 and Native Tongue.

== The Village B-Boy ==
Udofia's "The Village B-Boy" was a collection of over 20 images. The images reflect the vitality and exuberance of the biggest musical export into the United States after jazz. Udofia demonstrated the takeover of the Western pop culture by Africa in this collection, using graphite, paint markers, acrylic, spray paint and stencils.
