= Aurora Saigon United FC =

Vietnamese association football club

- Full name: Aurora Saigon United Football Club (Câu lạc bộ bóng đá Bình Minh Sài Gòn)
- Nickname: Chim Hạc Vàng (The Golden Flamingos)
- Founded: 1976; 50 years ago
- Ground: Thống Nhất Stadium
- Capacity: 15,000
- Owner: HungHau Holdings
- Chairman: Nguyễn Minh Đức
- Head coach: Ngô Quang Sang
- League: V.League 2
- 2025–26: V.League 2, 10th of 12
- Website: dongthapfc.org
| Home colours | Away colours |

Aurora Saigon United Football Club (Vietnamese: Câu lạc bộ Bóng đá Bình Minh Sài Gòn), formerly known as Dong Thap, is a Vietnamese professional football club based in Ho Chi Minh City. As a two-time champion of Vietnam's top division, the club was one of the most historically significant teams in the Mekong Delta region. They currently compete in the V.League 2.

== History ==
=== Golden era (1989–1996) ===
The club's most successful period was in the late 1980s and mid-1990s. Dong Thap won their first national title in the 1989 V-League, establishing themselves as a major force in Vietnamese football. They cemented their legacy by winning their second championship in the 1996 V-League. During this era, the team was known for producing talented players for the Vietnam national football team.

=== Period of decline and promotions (2000–2013) ===
After their golden era, the club entered a period of instability, becoming a "yo-yo club" that frequently moved between the top two divisions. They were relegated from the V.League 1 in 2001 but won the V.League 2 in 2006 to return, only to be relegated again in 2007. They earned another promotion in 2008 and achieved a respectable third-place finish in the 2010 V.League 1. However, another relegation followed in 2012.

=== Financial crisis and decline (2014–2026) ===
After winning the 2014 V.League 2, the club faced dissolution when its corporate sponsor withdrew funding. Lacking the resources for the 2015 V.League 1, the club was saved at the last minute by a new sponsorship deal. The club was acquired by HungHau Holdings in 2015. However, they were relegated again after a difficult 2016 V.League 1 season. Since then, Đồng Tháp became a regular participant in the V.League 2, working to rebuild and return to the top flight.

=== Relocation to Ho Chi Minh City and name change ===
In July 2026, after Cao Lãnh Stadium was reclaimed by Đồng Tháp province for the auction and exploitation of public assets, the team relocated to Ho Chi Minh City and changed their name to Aurora Saigon United.

== Stadium ==
From the club's creation until 2026, the club's home ground was Cao Lãnh Stadium, located in Cao Lanh city. It is a multi-use stadium with a capacity of 23,000 people and is primarily used for football matches.

== Kit suppliers and shirt sponsors ==
| Period | Kit manufacturer | Shirt sponsor |
|---|---|---|
| 2009-2014 | Nike | Tập đoàn Cao su Đồng Tháp, XSKT Đồng Tháp |
| 2016–2018 | Codad | XSKT Dong Thap; Van Hien University; Ranee; Happy Food; Ochao |
| 2018–present | Grand Sport | XSKT Dong Thap; Van Hien University; Ranee; Happy Food; Ochao |

== Performance in AFC competitions ==
- Asian Club Championship: 1 appearance

1997–98: Second round

| Season | Competition | Round | | Club | Home | Away |
|---|---|---|---|---|---|---|
| 1997–98 | Asian Club Championship | First round | (India) | Churchill Brothers | 0–0 | 1–0 |
| 1997–98 | Asian Club Championship | Second round | (Myanmar) | Finance and Revenue FC | 3–4 | 1–0 |

== Season-by-season record ==
| Season | Pld | Won | Draw | Lost | GF | GA | GD | PTS | Final position | Notes |
|---|---|---|---|---|---|---|---|---|---|---|
| 1980 V-League | 8 | 1 | 2 | 5 | 4 | 14 | −10 | 4 | 5th (group stage) | Relegation |
| 1981–1988 | | | | | | | | | | |
| 1989 V-League | 16 | 8 | 4 | 4 | 17 | 11 | +6 | 12 | Champions | |
| 1990 V-League | 8 | | | | | | | | 3rd | Qualify for 2nd stage |
| 1991 V-League | 10 | 2 | 6 | 2 | 7 | 5 | +2 | 9 | 4th | Group stage |
| 1993–94 V-League | 10 | 4 | 2 | 4 | 9 | 8 | +1 | 10 | | Qualify for 2nd stage |
| 1995 V-League | 14 | 7 | 1 | 6 | 18 | 13 | +5 | 15 | 3rd (group stage) | Qualify for final round |
| 1996 V-League | 16 | 7 | 4 | 5 | 23 | 15 | +8 | 18 | Champions | |
| 1997 V-League | 22 | 8 | 6 | 8 | 19 | 21 | −2 | 30 | 8th | Qualified for 1997–98 Asian Club Championship |
| 1998 V-League | 26 | 8 | 12 | 6 | 35 | 36 | −1 | 36 | 7th | |
| 1999–2000 V-League | 24 | 9 | 7 | 8 | 27 | 23 | +5 | 34 | 5th | |
| 2000–01 V-League | 18 | 4 | 7 | 7 | 23 | 32 | −9 | 19 | 9th | Relegation to 2002 First League |
| 2002 First League | 22 | 15 | 2 | 5 | 37 | 17 | +20 | 47 | 2nd | Promoted to 2003 V-League |
| 2003 V-League | 22 | 8 | 6 | 8 | 28 | 28 | +0 | 30 | 7th | |
| 2004 V-League | 22 | 7 | 4 | 11 | 23 | 29 | −6 | 25 | 8th | |
| 2005 V-League | 22 | 3 | 6 | 13 | 18 | 40 | −22 | 15 | 12th | Relegation to 2006 First League |
| 2006 First League | 26 | 16 | 5 | 5 | 39 | 17 | +22 | 53 | Champions | Promoted to 2007 V-League |
| 2007 V-League | 26 | 3 | 11 | 12 | 21 | 35 | −14 | 20 | 13th | Relegation to 2008 First League |
| 2008 First League | 26 | 13 | 8 | 5 | 42 | 23 | +19 | 47 | 3rd | Promoted to 2009 V-League |
| 2009 V-League | 26 | 10 | 8 | 8 | 43 | 31 | +12 | 38 | 5th | |
| 2010 V-League | 26 | 13 | 5 | 8 | 43 | 34 | +9 | 44 | 3rd | |
| 2011 V-League | 26 | 10 | 7 | 9 | 38 | 44 | −6 | 37 | 5th | |
| 2012 V-League | 26 | 7 | 9 | 10 | 32 | 38 | −6 | 30 | 13th | Relegation to 2013 V.League 2 |
| 2013 V.League 2 | 14 | 7 | 3 | 4 | 20 | 18 | +2 | 24 | 4th | |
| 2014 V.League 2 | 14 | 7 | 5 | 2 | 22 | 7 | +15 | 26 | Champions | Promoted to 2015 V.League 1 |
| 2015 V.League 1 | 26 | 7 | 3 | 16 | 34 | 54 | −20 | 24 | 12th | |
| 2016 V.League 1 | 26 | 1 | 5 | 20 | 22 | 67 | −45 | 8 | 14th | Relegation to 2017 V.League 2 |
| 2017 V.League 2 | 12 | 1 | 4 | 7 | 15 | 23 | −8 | 7 | 7th | Relegation playoffs |

== Current squad ==
As of 11 September 2026

Note: Flags indicate national team as defined under FIFA eligibility rules; some limited exceptions apply. Players may hold more than one non-FIFA nationality.

| No. | Pos. | Nation | Player |
|---|---|---|---|
| 1 | GK | VIE | Đoàn Thanh Nhã |
| 5 | MF | VIE | Võ Nhật Tân |
| 6 | MF | VIE | Bùi Duy Nam |
| 7 | MF | VIE | Võ Công Minh |
| 8 | MF | VIE | Hoàng Thanh Tùng |
| 9 | FW | VIE | Trần Thành |
| 10 | FW | VIE | Cao Quốc Khánh |
| 11 | MF | VIE | Nguyễn Tuấn Em |
| 12 | MF | VIE | Phạm Văn Soạn |
| 13 | MF | VIE | Nguyễn Hoàng Quốc Chí |
| 15 | DF | VIE | Nguyễn Đức Quyền (on loan from SHB Đà Nẵng) |
| 16 | MF | VIE | Nguyễn Minh Trung |
| 17 | MF | VIE | Hồ Minh Quyền |

| No. | Pos. | Nation | Player |
|---|---|---|---|
| 18 | DF | VIE | Nguyễn Hữu Lâm |
| 19 | MF | VIE | Trần Hữu Nghĩa |
| 20 | DF | VIE | Trịnh Văn Hà |
| 23 | DF | VIE | Bùi Ngọc Thịnh |
| 24 | MF | VIE | Phạm Quốc Tuấn |
| 26 | GK | VIE | Nguyễn Võ Chí Cường |
| 27 | DF | VIE | Nguyễn Hải Nam (on loan from PVF) |
| 28 | MF | VIE | Trương Thanh Vương |
| 29 | DF | VIE | Đỗ Minh Quang (on loan from PVF) |
| 30 | FW | SSD | Dor Jok |
| 31 | FW | VIE | Trần Nhật Đông |
| 35 | GK | VIE | Nguyễn Quang Trường (on loan from PVF) |
| 36 | MF | VIE | Lê Văn Đạt (on loan from SHB Đà Nẵng) |

== Current coaching staff ==
| Position | Name |
|---|---|
| Head coach | (Vietnam) Phan Thanh Bình |
| Assistant coach | (Vietnam) Nguyễn Thành Long Giang |
| Technical analyst | (Vietnam) Nguyễn Văn Bước (Vietnam) Nguyễn Văn Ngân |
| Doctor | (Vietnam) Nguyễn Hữu Quý An |

== Managers ==
- (Vietnam) Đoàn Minh Xương (1986–1999)
- (Vietnam) Trần Công Minh (2003–04)
- (Vietnam) Lại Hồng Vân (2006 – June 2007)
- (Vietnam) Đoàn Minh Xương (June 2007 – Sept 07)
- (Vietnam) Phạm Anh Tuấn (Oct 2007 – Jan 08)
- (Vietnam) Phạm Công Lộc (Nov 2008 – Feb 11)
- (Vietnam) Trang Văn Thành (Jan 2011 – Apr 12)
- (Vietnam) Trần Công Minh (Apr 2012 – Apr 2013)
- (Vietnam) Phạm Công Lộc (Apr 2013– Apr 2016)
- (Vietnam) Trần Công Minh (May 2016– Jul 2019)
- (Vietnam) Nguyễn Anh Tông (Jul 2019– Dec 2020)
- (Vietnam) Phan Thanh Bình (Feb 2022–present)

== Honours ==
=== National competitions ===
- V.League 1
  - Winners (2): 1989, 1996
  - Third place (1): 2010
- V.League 2
  - Winners (2): 2006, 2014
  - Runners-up (1): 2002
  - Third place (1): 2008
