= List of Minangkabau people =

This is a list of notable Minangkabau people.

== Academics ==
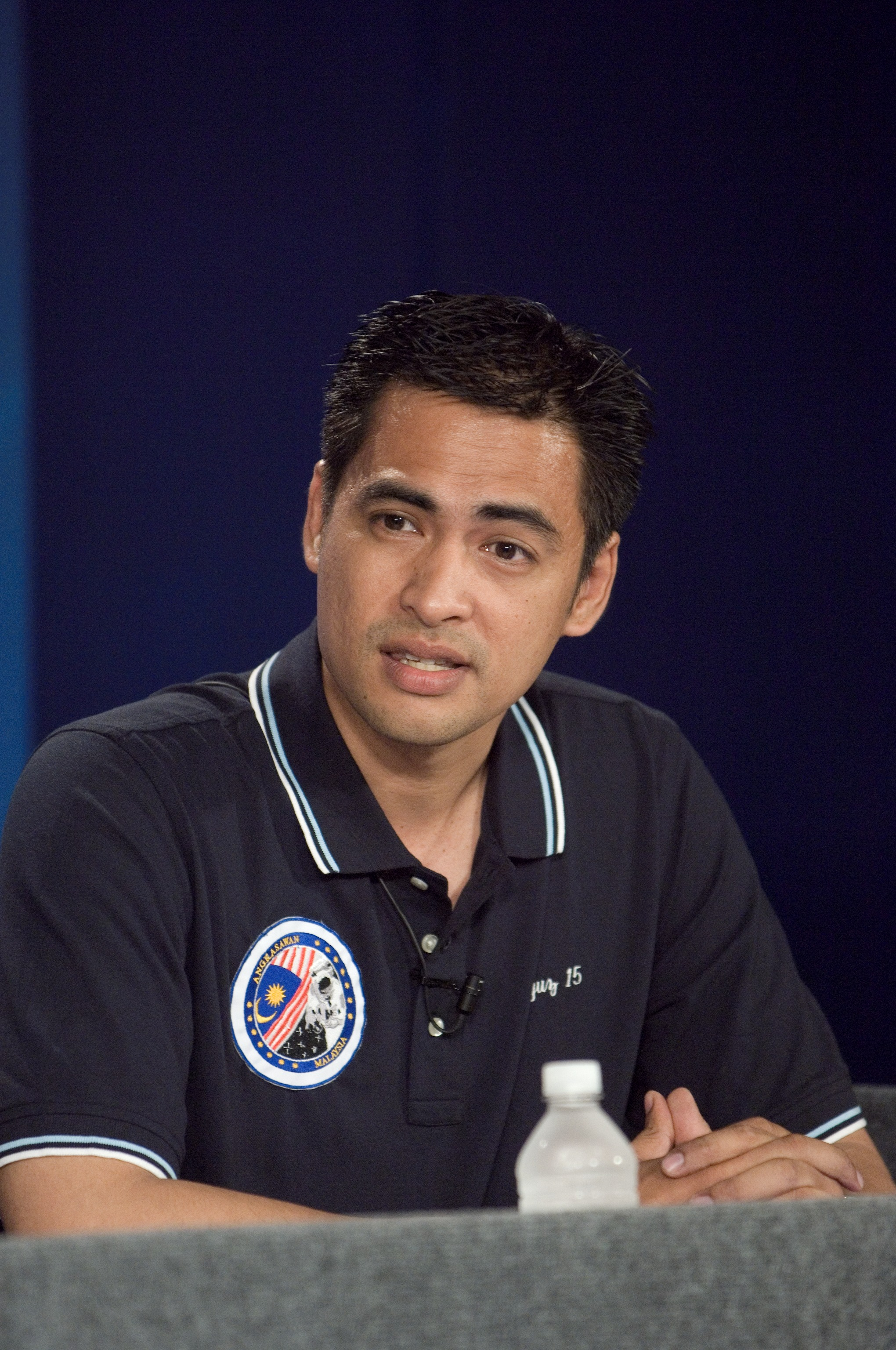
Sheikh Muszaphar Shukor

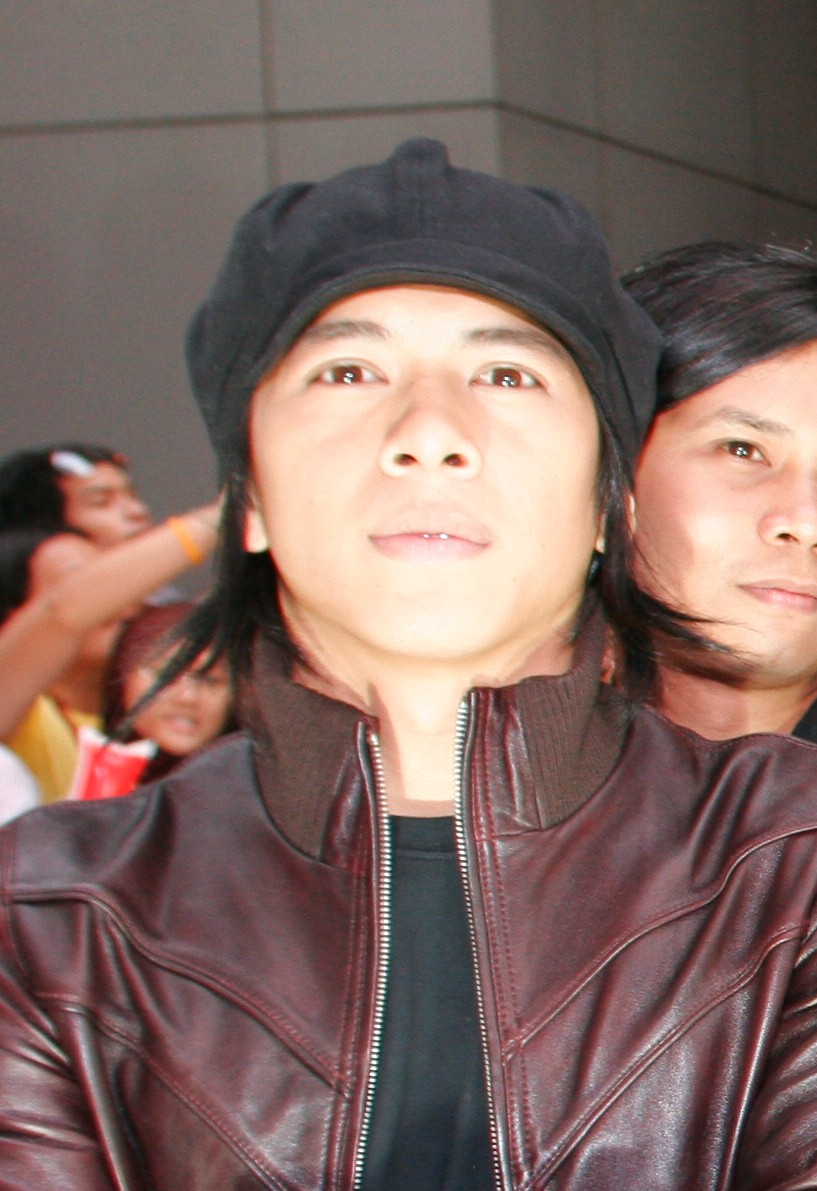
Nazril Irham

Syahrir

- Arbi Sanit, political scientist
- Arifin Bey, social scientist
- Azyumardi Azra, social religion scientist, rector
- Deliar Noer, political scientist
- Dewi Fortuna Anwar, political scientist
- Ismail Mohamed Ali, governor of Bank Negara Malaysia
- James Mahmud Rice, sociologist
- Moeslim Taher, rector and owner Jayabaya University
- Riri Fitri Sari, computer scientist
- Rustam Sani, political scientist
- Said Djauharsjah Jenie, technology scientist
- Sheikh Muszaphar Shukor, Astronaut, Malaysian orthopaedic surgeon
- Syahril Sabirin, governor of Bank Indonesia
- Syahrir, economist
- Werry Darta Taifur, economist
- Yurdi Yasmi, forestry scientist
- Zakiah Daradjat, Islamic psychologist

== Artists ==
- Amrus Natalsya, realism painter, wood sculpture
- Huriah Adam, dancer, dance choreographer
- Iwan Tirta, batik designer
- Mochtar Apin, painter
- Sutan Amrull, American make-up artist
- Whulandary Herman, model, Puteri Indonesia 2012-2013, Top 16 Miss Universe 2013
- Yunizar, painter

== Athletes ==
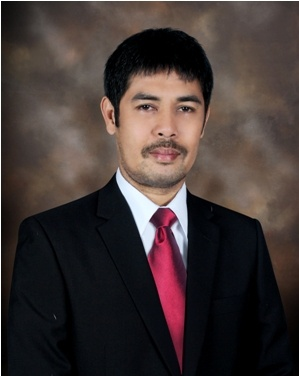
Nil Maizar

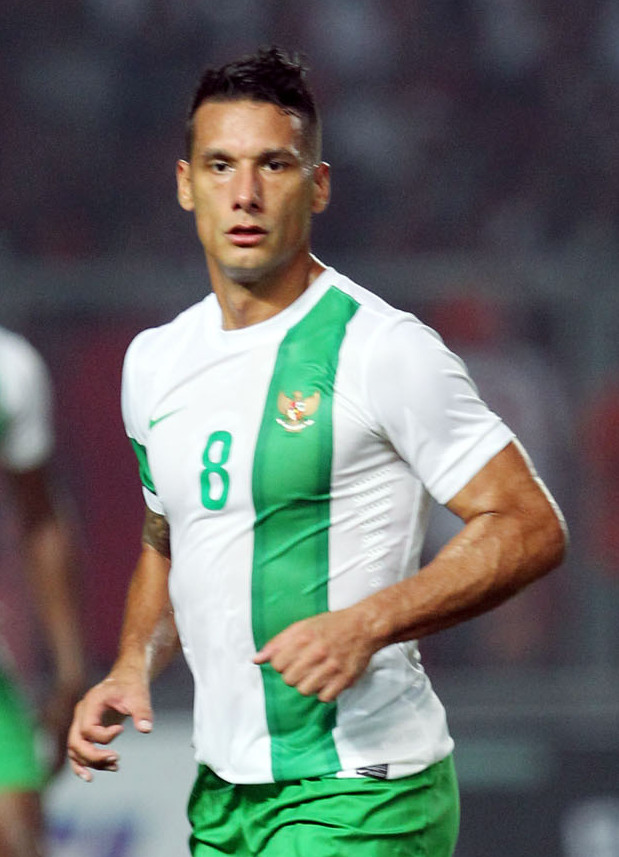
Raphael Maitimo

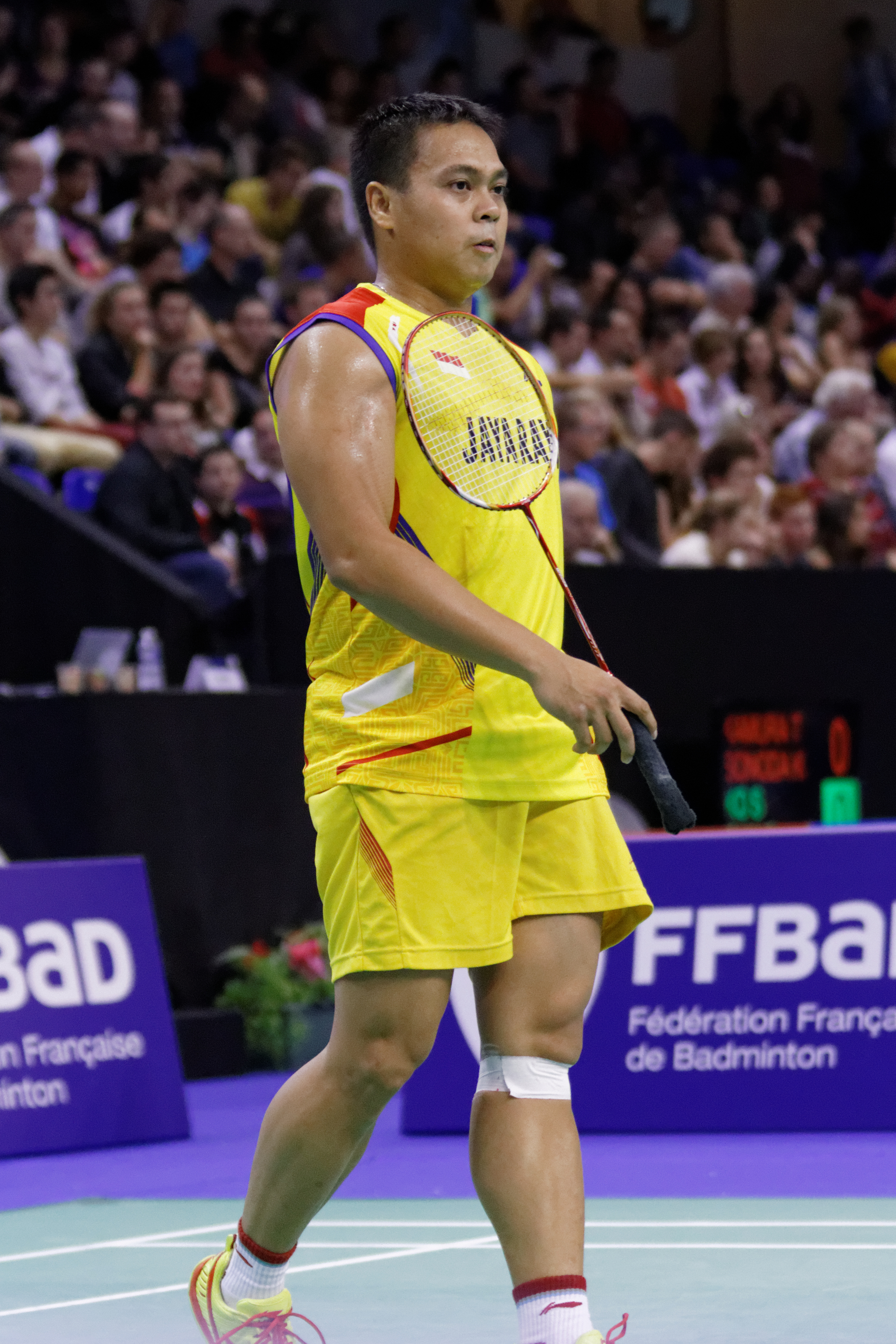
Markis Kido

- Aero Sutan Aswar, Indonesian jet skier
- Alan Martha, Indonesian football athlete
- Ananda Mikola, Indonesian race car driver
- Aqsa Sutan Aswar, Indonesian jet skier
- Bona Septano, Indonesian badminton athlete
- Defia Rosmaniar, Indonesian taekwondo athlete
- Denny Sumargo, Indonesian basketball athlete
- Gitra Yuda Furton, Indonesian football athlete
- Hari Novian Caniago, Indonesian basketball athlete
- Hengky Ardiles, Indonesian football athlete
- Indra Sjafri, Indonesian football athlete
- Irsyad Maulana, Indonesian football athlete
- Jandia Eka Putra, Indonesian football athlete
- Jafri Sastra, Indonesian football coach
- Leo Guntara, Indonesian football athlete
- Markis Kido, Indonesian badminton athlete
- Aidil Zafuan, Malaysian football athlete
- Zaquan Adha, Malaysian football athlete
- Moreno Suprapto, Indonesian race car driver
- Muhammad Fauzan Jamal, Indonesian football athlete
- Nasrul Koto, Indonesian football athlete
- Nil Maizar, Indonesian football coach and former football player
- Novrianto, Indonesian football athlete
- Novri Setiawan, Indonesian football athlete
- Oktavianus, Indonesian football athlete
- Pia Zebadiah Bernadet, Indonesian badminton athlete
- Raphael Maitimo, Indonesian football athlete
- Rommy Diaz Putra, Indonesian football athlete
- Rully Desrian, Indonesian football athlete
- Silvi Antarini, Indonesian badminton athlete
- Sutan Anwar, Indonesian football athlete
- Syamsir Alam, Indonesian football athlete
- Teja Paku Alam, Indonesian football athlete
- Tommy Pranata, Indonesian football athlete
- Tri Rahmad Priadi, Indonesian football athlete
- Usman Diarra, Indonesian football athlete
- Yaspi Boby, Indonesian sprinter
- Yeyen Tumena, Indonesian football athlete
- Zahra Muzdalifah, Indonesian football athlete

== Authors ==
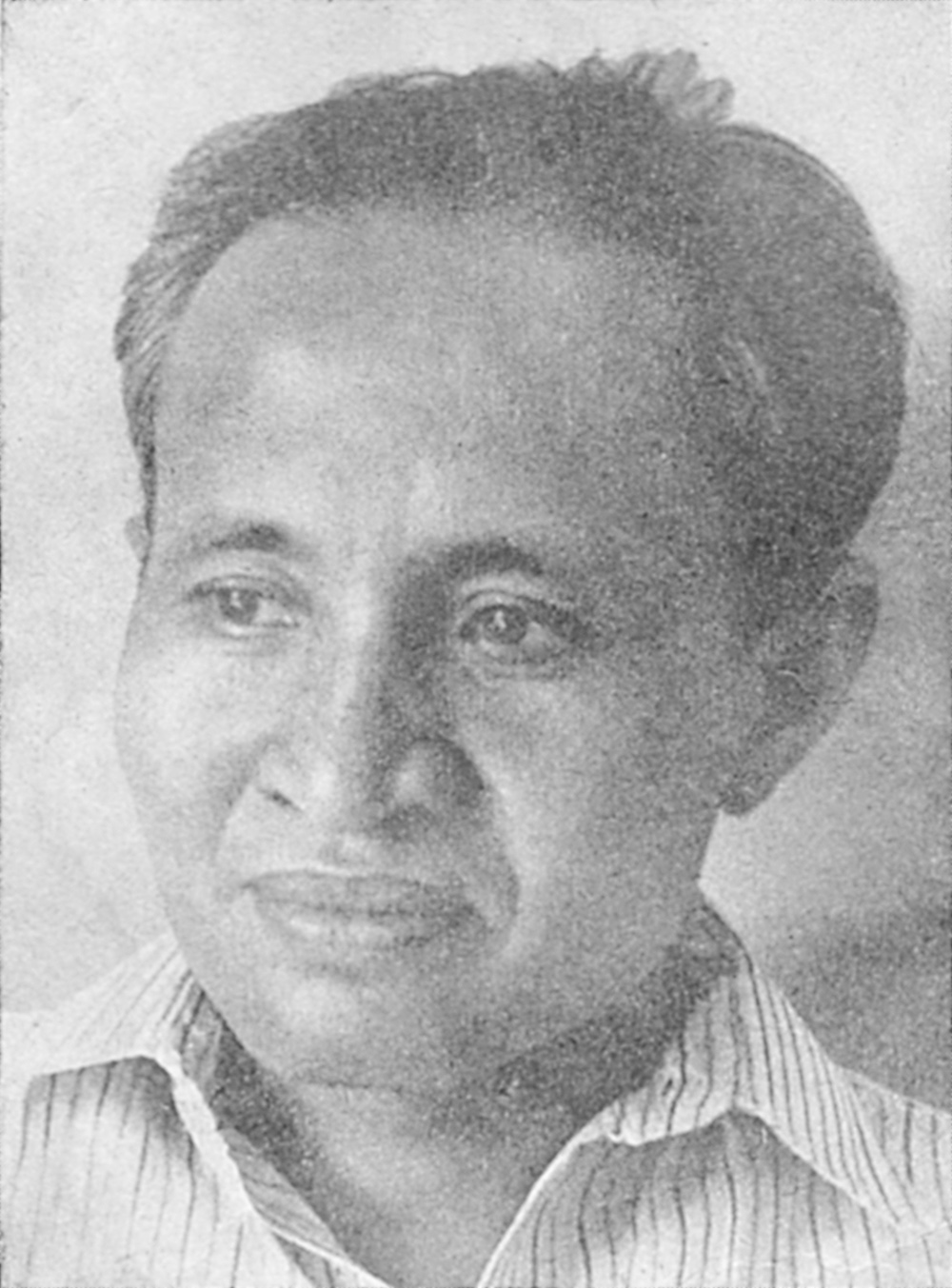
St. Takdir Alisjahbana

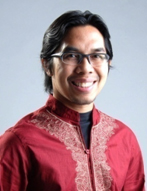
Ahmad Fuadi

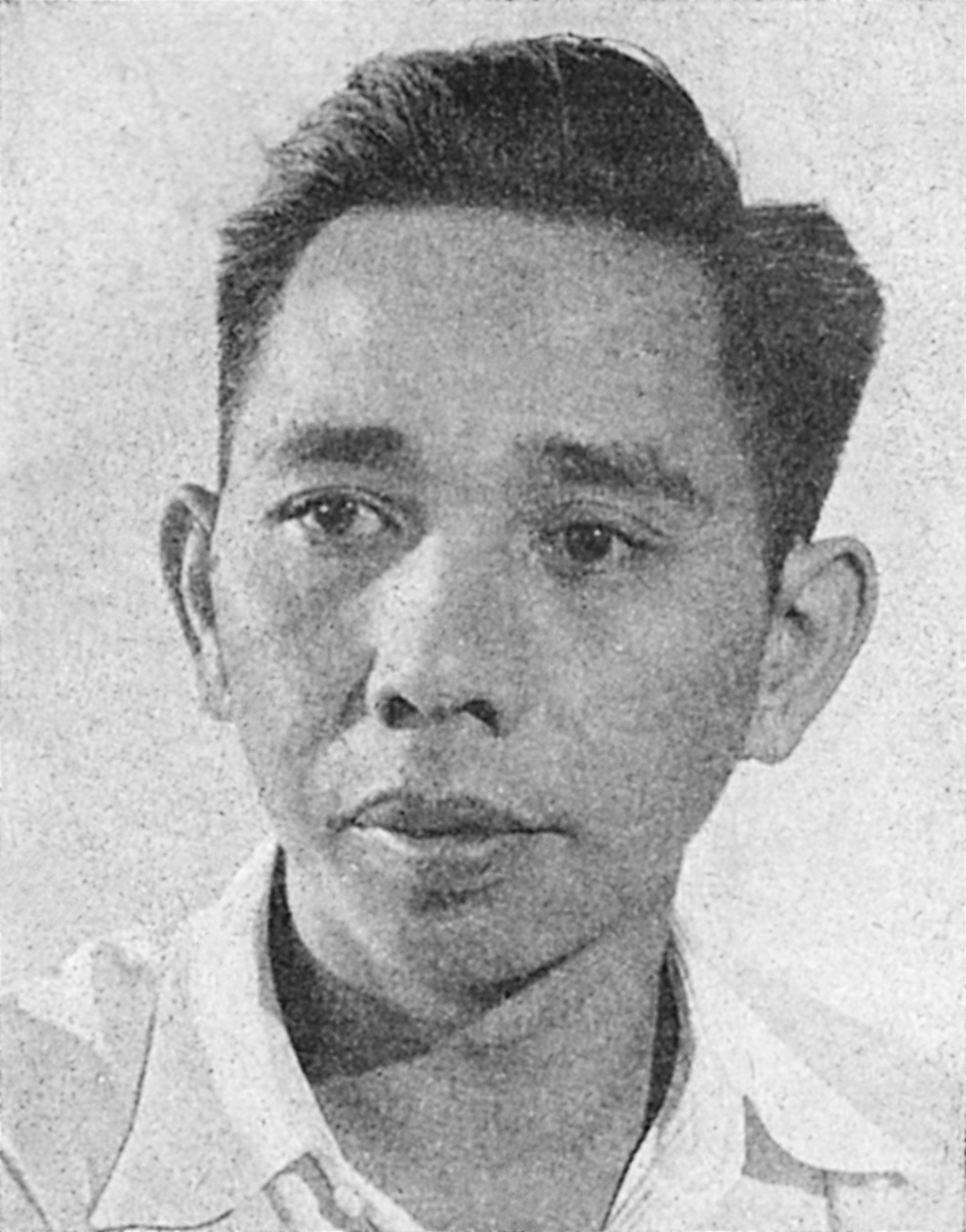
Idrus

- Abdul Muis, Indonesian novelist, famous novel: Salah Asuhan
- Afrizal Malna, Indonesian writer
- Ahmad Fuadi, Indonesian novelist, famous novel: Negeri 5 Menara
- Alfian Sa'at, Singaporean writer
- Ali Akbar Navis, Indonesian author, famous novel: Kemarau
- Gus tf Sakai, Indonesian writer
- Hamka, Islamic scholar, Indonesian novelist, famous novels: Merantau ke Deli, Tenggelamnya Kapal Van Der Wijck, Di Bawah Lindungan Ka'bah
- Idrus, Indonesian author, famous story: "Dari Ave Maria ke Jalan Lain ke Roma"
- Karim Halim, Indonesian author
- Marah Roesli, Indonesian novelist, famous novel: Siti Nurbaya
- Marina Mahathir, Malaysian novelist
- Motinggo Busye, Indonesian novelist, famous novel: Malam Jahanam
- Nur Sutan Iskandar, Indonesian novelist, famous novel: Hulubalang Raja
- Saadah Alim, Indonesian author
- Sariamin Ismail, Indonesian novelist, famous novel: Kalau Tak Untung
- Sutan Takdir Alisjahbana, Indonesian novelist, famous novel: Layar Terkembang
- Tulis Sutan Sati, Indonesian novelist, famous novel: Sengsara Membawa Nikmat
- Wisran Hadi, Indonesian novelist
- Zainal Abidin Ahmad, Malaysian writer and language experts
- Zuber Usman, Indonesian writer

== Businesspeople ==
- Abdul Latief, owner of ALatief Corporation
- Ahmad Sahroni, owner of fuel shipping company
- Basrizal Koto, owner of Basko Group, Indonesia
- Handry Satriago, CEO of General Electric Indonesia
- Hasnul Suhaimi, CEO of Excelcomindo Pratama
- Hasyim Ning, Indonesian car assembly businessman
- Joesoef Isak, founder of Hasta Mitra publishing house
- Kamarudin Meranun, Chairman of AirAsia and CEO of the Tune Group
- Mohamed Taib bin Haji Abdul Samad, tycoon in the early history of Kuala Lumpur
- Mokhzani Mahathir, owner of Kencana Capital Sdn. Bhd
- Nadiem Makarim, founder and CEO of Go-Jek and Indonesian government minister
- Nasimuddin Amin, Malaysian car assembly businessman
- Rinaldi Firmansyah, CEO of Telekomunikasi Indonesia
- Tunku Imran, owner of Antah Holdings, Malaysia
- Tunku Naquiyuddin, owner of Antah Holdings, Malaysia
- Tunku Tan Sri Abdullah, owner of Melewar Group, Malaysia

== Composers and musicians ==
- Guruh Sukarnoputra, choreographer and songwriter
- Saiful Bahri, composer and songwriter
- Wandly Yazid, composer
- Zubir Said, composer of the national anthem of Singapore, "Majulah Singapura"

== Diplomats ==
- Dino Patti Djalal, Indonesian ambassador and deputy Foreign Minister
- Fouad Abdulhameed Alkhateeb, Saudi Arabian ambassador
- Hasjim Djalal, Indonesian ambassador
- Razali Ismail, Malaysian ambassador
- Zahrain Mohamed Hashim, Malaysian ambassador

== Entertainers ==
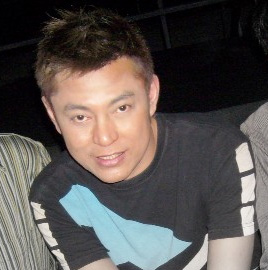
Aznil Nawawi

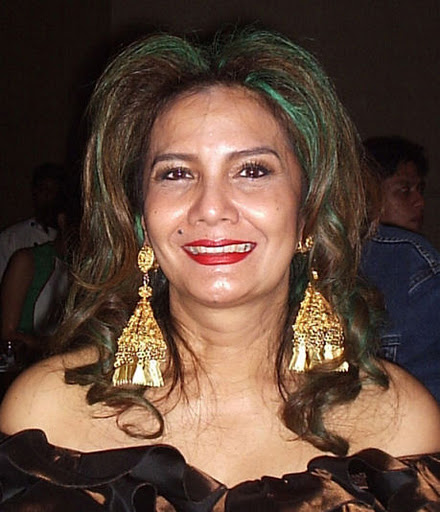
Christine Hakim

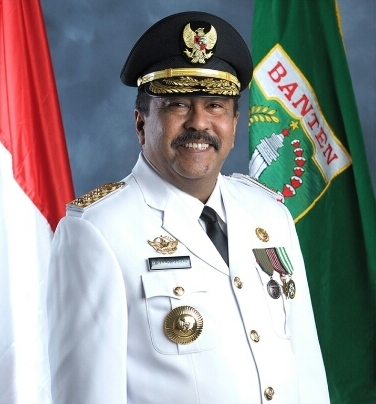
Rano Karno

- Acha Septriasa, actress
- Aliando Syarief, actor, model
- Angela Nazar, actress, singer
- Atta Halilintar, actor, influencer, singer
- Awaludin, actor
- Aznil Nawawi, actor, TV host
- Billy Syahputra, actor, comedian
- Bunga Citra Lestari, actress, pop singer
- Camelia Malik, actress
- Christine Hakim, actress
- Dede Yusuf, actor
- Dude Harlino, actor
- Eva Arnaz, actress
- Hilbram Dunar, presenter
- HIM Damsyik, actor
- Imelda Therinne, actress, model
- Karina Nadila, actress, model
- Kirana Larasati, actress
- Kiwil, comedian
- Laudya Chintya Bella, actress
- Marissa Anita, actress
- Marshanda, actress
- Masayu Anastasia, actress
- Melanie Putria Dewita Sari, actress and television hostess
- Meuthia Kasim, presenter
- Nagita Slavina, actress and singer
- Nikita Mirzani, actress, model and presenter
- Nikita Willy, actress
- Niniek L. Karim, actress
- Nirina Zubir, actress
- Okky Lukman, comedian
- Olga Syahputra, comedian
- Raihaanun, actress
- Rano Karno, actor, governor of Banten
- Revalina Sayuthi Temat, actress
- Ria Irawan, actress
- Sheila Dara Aisha, actress and singer
- Shireen Sungkar, actress and singer
- Soekarno M. Noer, actor
- Soloz Faris, Malaysian esports player
- Sukma Ayu, actress
- Titi Rajo Bintang, actress and musician
- Zainal Abidin, actor
- Zaskia Adya Mecca, actress
- Zaskia Sungkar, actress

== Filmmakers ==
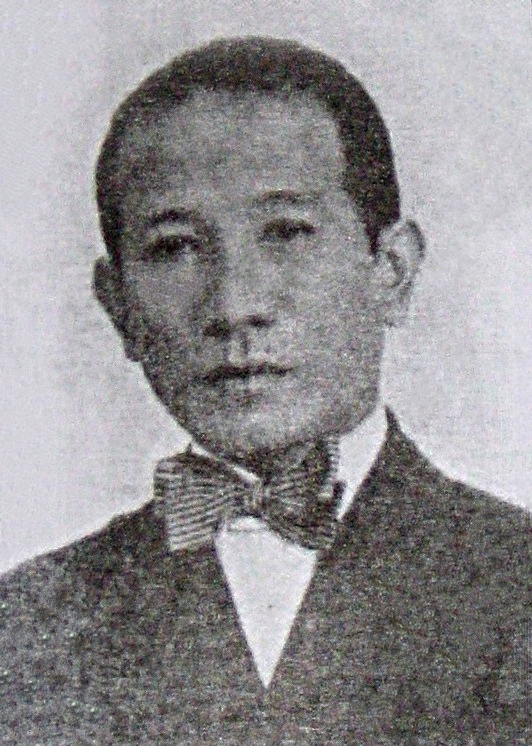
Andjar Asmara

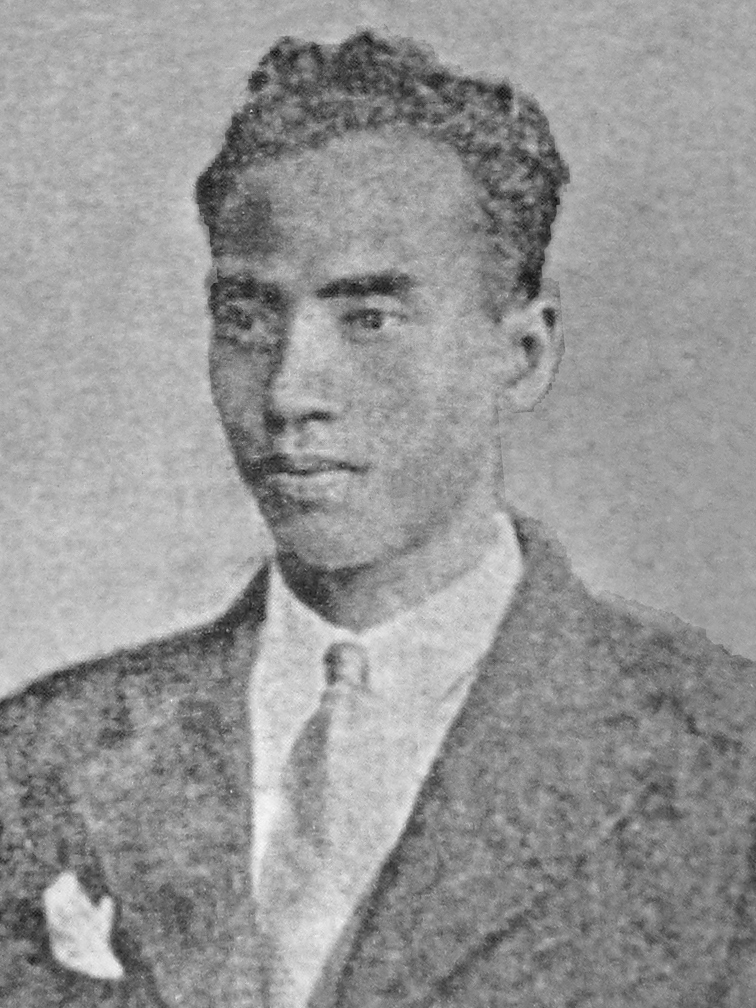
Bachtiar Effendi

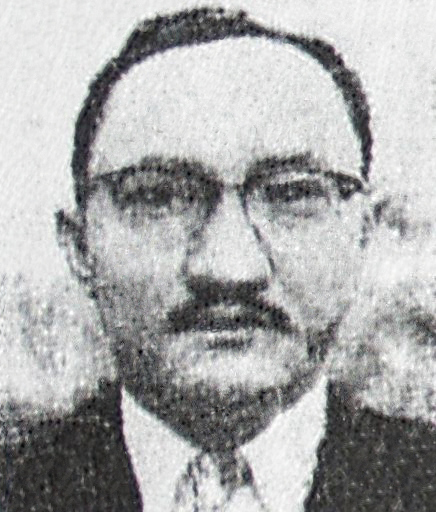
Usmar Ismail

- Andjar Asmara, film director
- Arizal, film director
- Asrul Sani, screenwriter
- Bachtiar Effendi, film director
- Djamaluddin Malik, film producer
- Jajang C. Noer, film producer
- John de Rantau, film director
- Misbach Yusa Biran, film director and pioneer of Indonesian film archive
- Nan Achnas, film director
- Nasri Cheppy, film director
- Nia Dinata, film director
- Roestam Sutan Palindih, film director
- Salman Aristo, screenwriter and film director
- Upi Avianto, film director
- Usmar Ismail, film producer
- U-Wei Haji Saari, film director

== First Ladies ==
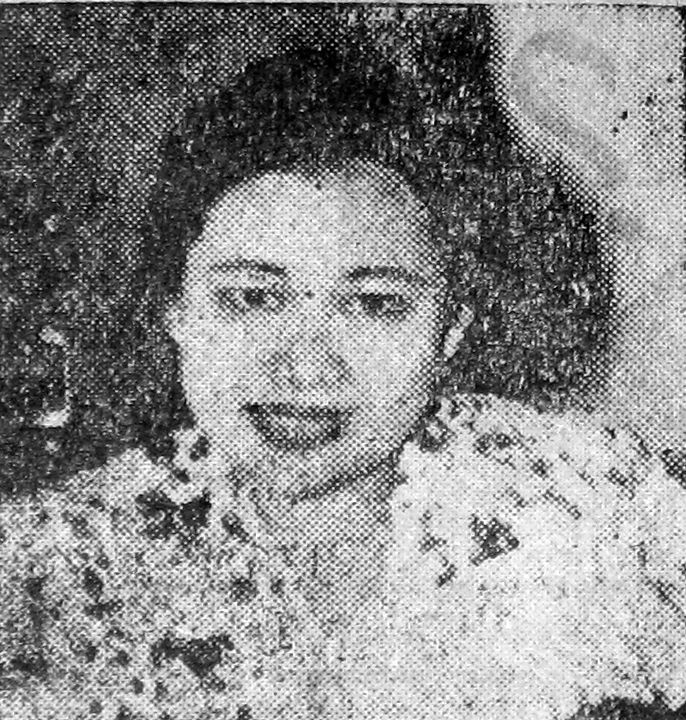
Fatmawati

- Fatmawati, Indonesian first lady
- Rosmah Mansor, Malaysian first lady
- Siti Hasmah Mohamad Ali, Malaysian first lady
- Tuanku Bahiyah, Raja Permaisuri Agong of Malaysia and Sultanah of Kedah
- Tuanku Najihah, Raja Permaisuri Agong of Malaysia and Tunku Ampuan of Negeri Sembilan
- Tunku Kurshiah, Raja Permaisuri Agong of Malaysia and Tunku Ampuan Besar of Negeri Sembilan

== Journalists ==
- Abdoel Rivai, journalist in colonial era and founder of Pewarta Wolanda
- Ani Idrus, founder of Waspada daily newspaper
- Atika Suri, TV newscaster and newscast producer
- Budi Putra, technology journalist
- Djamaluddin Adinegoro, journalist in the colonial era
- Desi Anwar, reporter of Metro TV
- Erwin Arnada, journalist, film director
- Mahyuddin Datuk Sutan Maharadja, early newspaper editor, journalist and intellectual
- Rohana Kudus, first Indonesian female journalist
- Rosihan Anwar, founder of Pedoman
- Yusril Djalinus, co-founder of Tempo magazine

== Monarchies ==
- Adityawarman, founder royal dynasty of Pagaruyung
- Abdul Rahman of Negeri Sembilan, the first Yang di-Pertuan Agong Malaysia
- Antah, king of Negeri Sembilan
- Dara Jingga, Dharmasraya princess
- Dara Petak, Dharmasraya princess
- Jaafar of Negeri Sembilan, Yang di-Pertuan Agong Malaysia
- Raja Kecil, sultan of the Sultanate of Siak Sri Indrapura
- Melewar, king of Negeri Sembilan
- Muhriz of Negeri Sembilan, Yang di-Pertuan Besar of Negeri Sembilan, Malaysia

== Legal system ==
- Arminsyah, vice attorney general of Indonesia
- Basrief Arief, attorney general of Indonesia
- Saldi Isra, justice of the Indonesian Constitutional Court
- Sukma Violetta, deputy chairwoman of the Judicial Commission of Indonesia

== Military ==
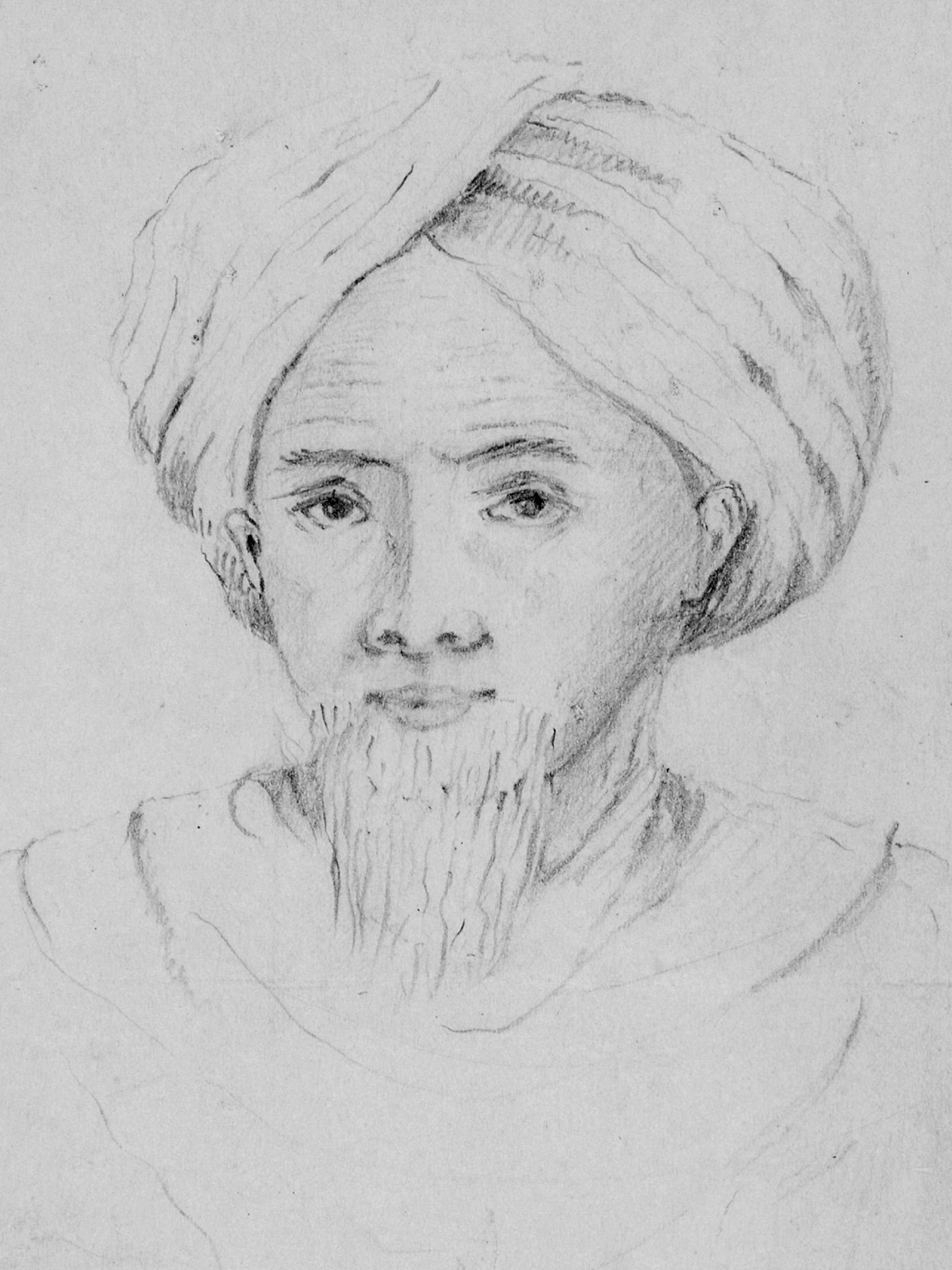
Tuanku Imam Bonjol

- Adnan Bin Saidi, Malayan World War II 1st Malay Regiment, battle of bukit candu, commander
- Cut Nyak Dhien, commander of Aceh War
- Chappy Hakim, Indonesian Air Force's chief of the air staff
- Daan Jahja, chief of staff of the Siliwangi Division and military governor of Jakarta
- Dato' Bahaman, Malaysian warrior
- Doni Monardo, head of the Indonesian National Board for Disaster Management.
- Kemal Idris, Indonesian commander of KOSTRAD
- Kivlan Zen, Indonesian commander of KOSTRAD
- Teuku Umar, commander of Aceh War
- Tuanku Imam Bonjol, commander of Padri War
- Tuanku Tambusai, leader of Padri War
- Mohamed Hashim Mohd Ali, General (Rtd), 9th Commander, Malaysian Armed Forces Chief of Defence Forces

== Politicians ==
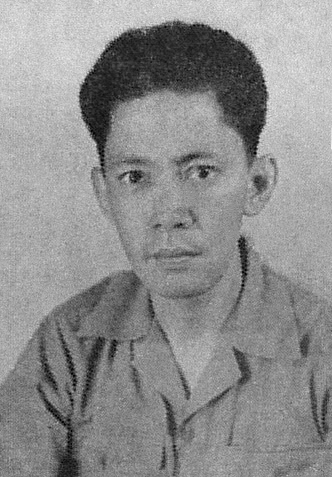
Abdul Halim

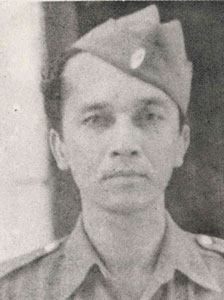
A.K. Gani

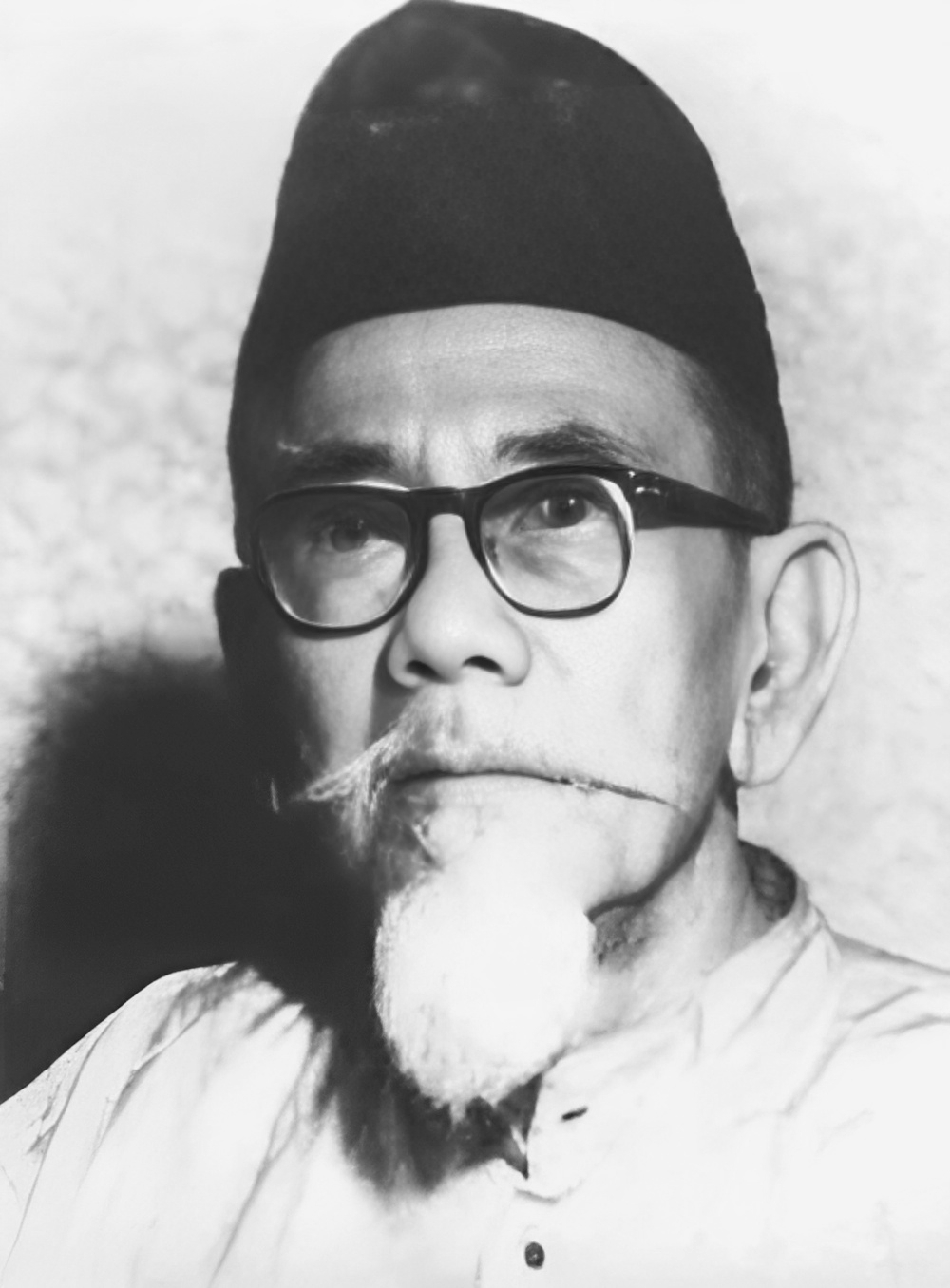
Agus Salim

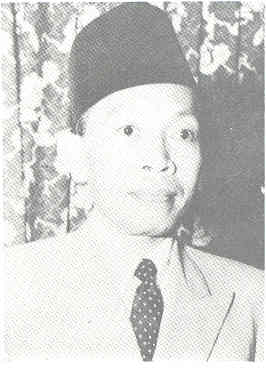
Assaat

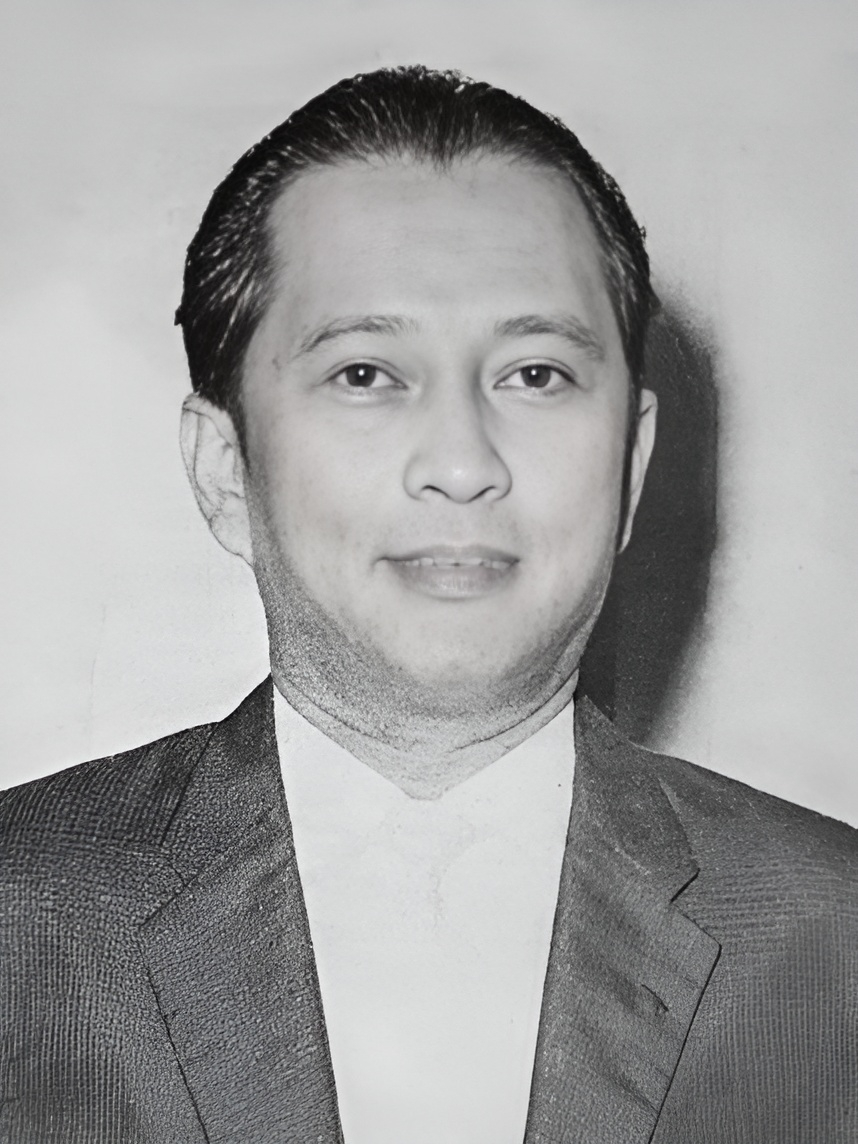
Chaerul Saleh

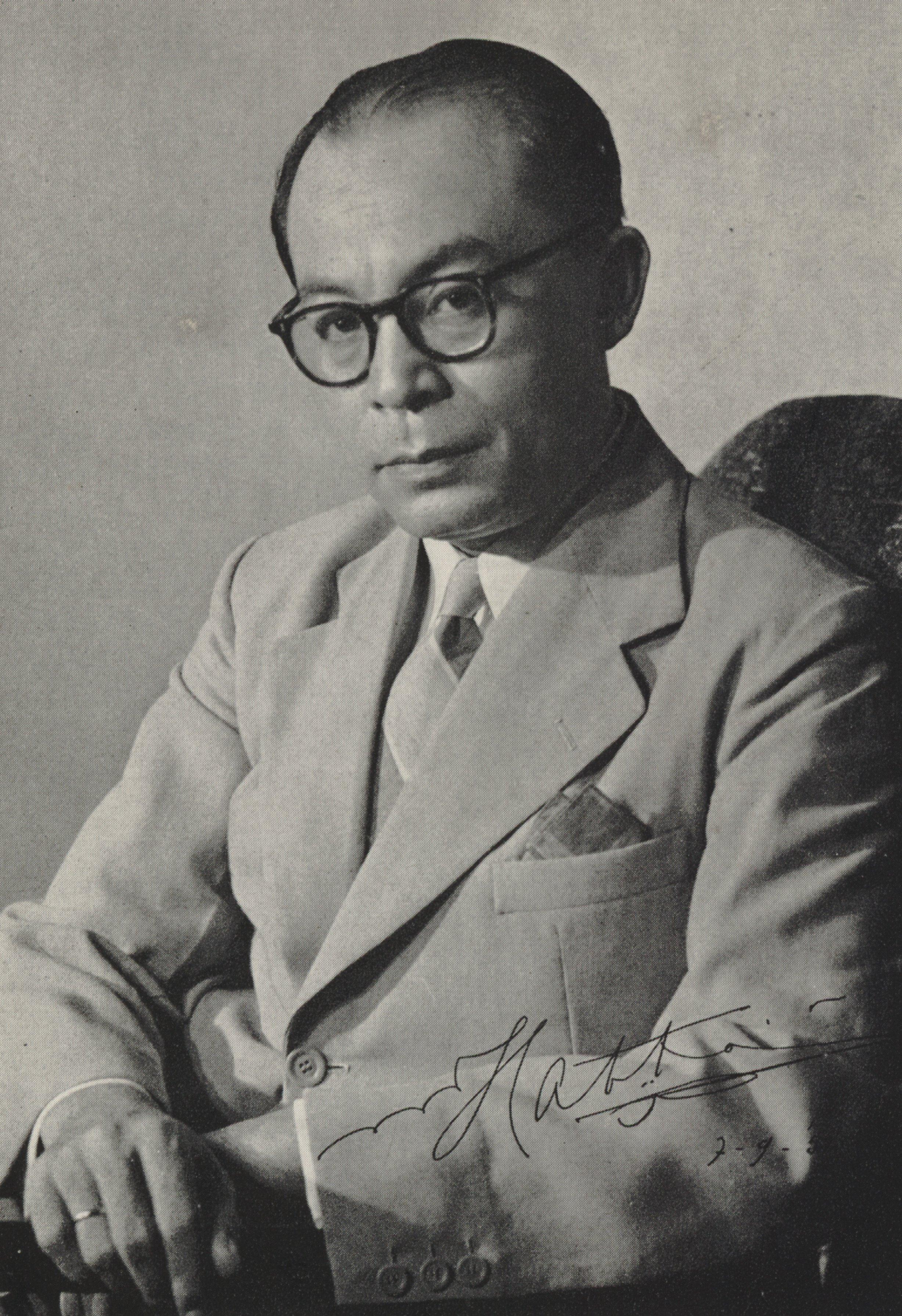
Hatta

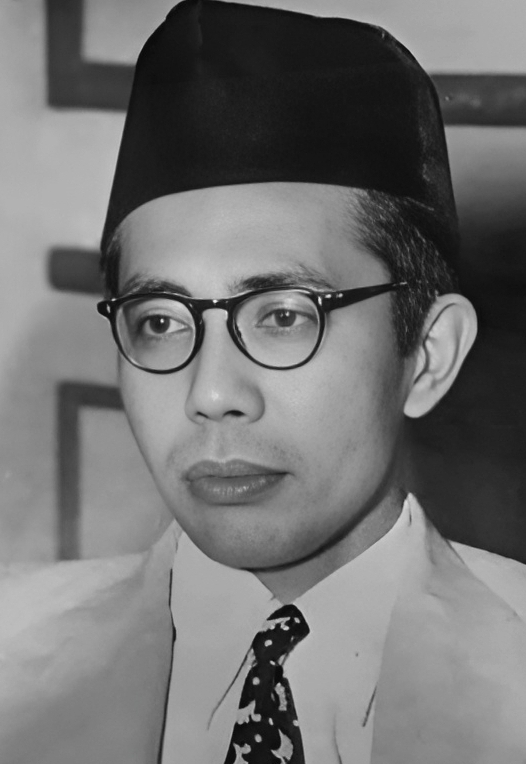
Natsir

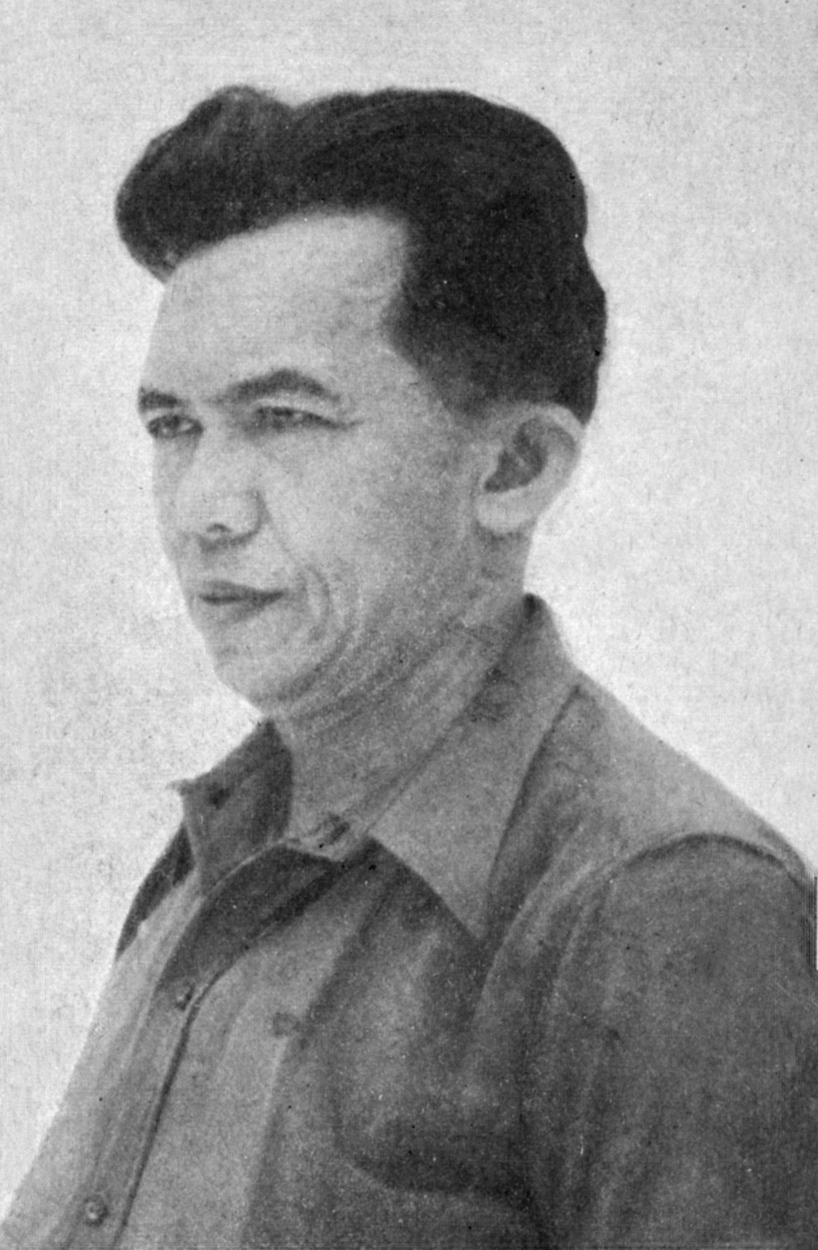
Tan Malaka

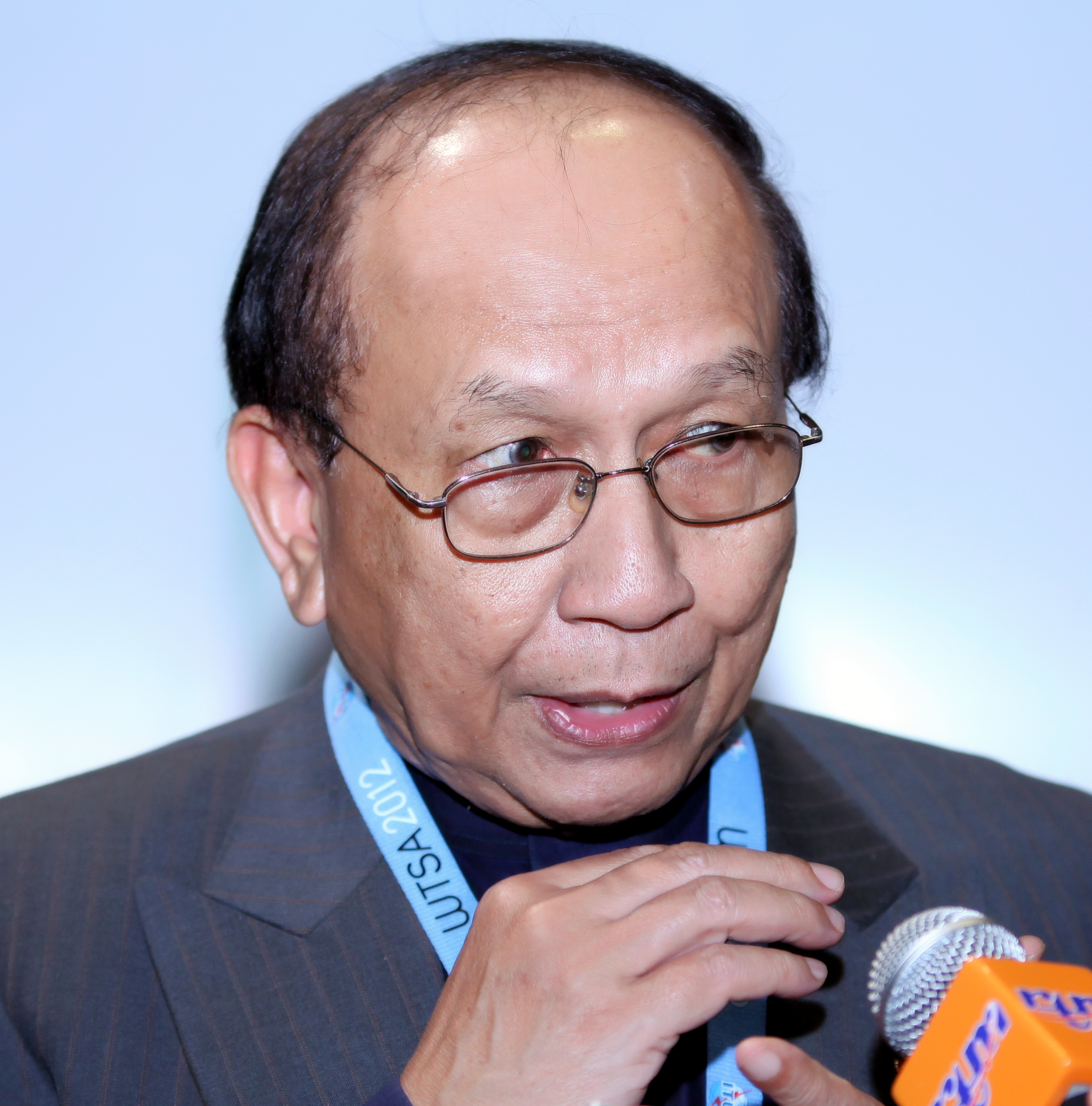
Rais Yatim

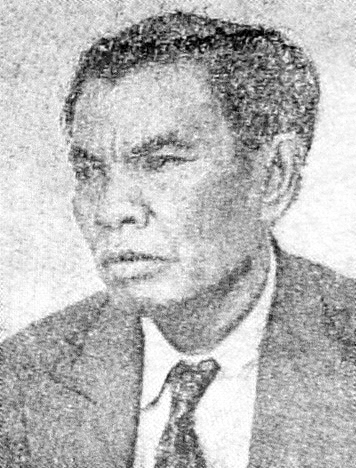
Moh. Yamin

- Abdul Aziz Shamsuddin, Malaysian minister
- Abdul Halim, Indonesian prime minister
- Abdullah CD, chairman of the Communist Party of Malaya
- Abdul Rahim Ishak, Singaporean government minister
- Abdul Samad Idris, Malaysian minister
- Abubakar Jaar, resident of North Sumatra and West Sumatra
- Adnan Kapau Gani, deputy prime minister of Indonesia
- Agus Salim, Indonesian diplomat, former Indonesian government minister
- Ahmad Boestaman, chairman of Parti Rakyat Malaysia
- Ahmad Kanedi, mayor of Bengkulu
- Ahmad Riza Patria, Indonesian government deputy minister
- Aishah Ghani, Malaysian government minister
- Amirsham Abdul Aziz, Malaysian government minister
- Arcandra Tahar, Indonesian government minister
- Arifin Tasrif, Indonesian government minister
- Armida Alisjahbana, Indonesian government minister
- Arsyadjuliandi Rachman, governor of Riau
- Assaat, acting president of Indonesian
- Aziz Ishak, Malaysian government minister
- Azwar Anas, Indonesian government minister
- Bachtiar Chamsyah, Indonesian government minister
- Bagindo Azizchan, mayor of Padang
- Bahaman Samsudin, Malaysian government minister
- Bahder Djohan, Indonesian government minister
- Burhanuddin al-Helmy, president of the Pan-Malaysian Islamic Party
- Bustanil Arifin, Indonesian government minister
- Chaerul Saleh, deputy prime minister of Indonesia
- Dipa Nusantara Aidit, leader of the Communist Party of Indonesia
- Emil Salim, Indonesian government minister
- Eny Karim, Indonesian government minister
- Erry Nuradi, governor of North Sumatra
- Fachrul Razi, Indonesian government minister
- Fadli Zon, Indonesian government minister
- Fahmi Fadzil, Malaysian government minister
- Fahmi Idris, Indonesian government minister
- Gamawan Fauzi, Indonesian government minister
- Ghafar Baba, deputy prime minister of Malaysia
- Ghazali Shafie, Malaysian government minister
- Giring Ganesha, Indonesian government deputy minister
- Hamdan Sheikh Tahir, Yang di-Pertua Negeri of Penang, Malaysia
- Hamzah Abu Samah, Malaysian government minister
- Harry Azhar Azis, chairman of the Audit Board of Indonesia
- Harun Zain, Indonesian government minister
- Hasan Basri Durin, Indonesian government minister
- Hasan Malek, Malaysian government minister
- Hasan Nasbi, chief of Presidential Communication Office
- Hazairin, Indonesian government minister
- Irman Gusman, speaker of the Regional Representative Council (DPD) of Indonesia
- Irwan Prayitno, governor of West Sumatra, Indonesia
- Khairy Jamaluddin, Malaysian government minister
- Mahendra Siregar, chief of Indonesian Financial Services Authority
- Mahyeldi Ansharullah, governor of West Sumatra, Indonesia
- Marzuki Usman, Indonesian government minister
- Megawati Sukarnoputri, Indonesian president
- Meutia Hatta, Indonesian government minister
- Mohamad Isa, governor of South Sumatra
- Mohamad Hasan, Negeri Sembilan government minister
- Mohammad Hatta, Indonesian prime minister and the first Indonesian vice president
- Mohammad Nasroen, Indonesian government minister
- Mohammad Nazir, Indonesian government minister
- Mokhtar Hashim, Malaysian government minister
- Mokhtaruddin Lasso, founder of Parti Kebangsaan Melayu Malaya
- Muhamad Chatib Basri, Indonesian government minister
- Muhammad Djosan, governor of Maluku
- Muhammad bin Haji Muhammad Taib, Malaysian government minister
- Muhammad Natsir, Indonesian prime minister, founder of Masyumi Party
- Muhammad Yamin, Indonesian government minister
- Mujahid Yusof Rawa, Malaysian government minister
- Mukhriz Mahathir, Malaysian politician, Chief Minister of Kedah
- Napsiah Omar, Malaysian government minister
- Nasrul Abit, vice governor of West Sumatra
- Nila Moeloek, Indonesian government minister
- Nova Iriansyah, governor of Aceh
- Oesman Sapta Odang, speaker of the Regional Representative Council of Indonesia
- Patrialis Akbar, Indonesian government minister
- Puan Maharani, Indonesian government minister
- Rafidah Aziz, Malaysian government minister
- Rahmah el Yunusiyah, Indonesian parliamentarian and women's education activist
- Rais Yatim, Malaysian government minister
- Raja Juli Antoni, Indonesian government minister
- Rashid Maidin, leader of the Communist Party of Malaya
- Rasuna Said, Indonesian nationalist political leader
- Rizal Nurdin, governor of North Sumatra
- Rizal Ramli, Indonesian government minister
- Rustam Effendi, member of the House of Representatives of the Netherlands
- Said Rasad, mayor of Padang
- Sha'ari Tadin, member of Parliament of Singapore
- Shamsiah Fakeh, leader of the Communist Party of Malaya
- Shaziman Abu Mansor, Malaysian government minister
- Siti Zaharah Sulaiman, Malaysian government minister
- Sjafruddin Prawiranegara, head of PDRI
- Sjarifuddin Baharsjah, Indonesian government minister
- Sofyan Djalil, Indonesian government minister
- Sutan Sjahrir, first Indonesian prime minister, founder of Socialist Party of Indonesia
- Tan Malaka, international communist politician
- Tarmizi Taher, Indonesian government minister
- Taufiq Kiemas, chairman of Indonesia People's Consultative Assembly
- Tifatul Sembiring, Indonesian government minister
- Yassierli, Indonesian government minister
- Yusof Ishak, first president of Singapore
- Yusof Rawa, president of the Pan-Malaysian Islamic Party
- Yusril Ihza Mahendra, Indonesian government minister
- Zulhasnan Rafique, Malaysian government minister

== Poets ==
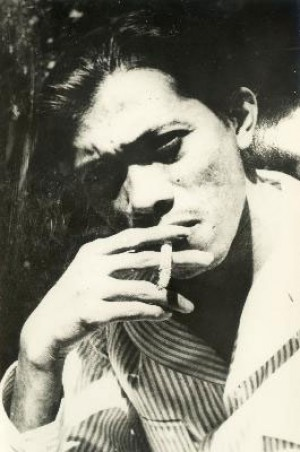
Chairil Anwar

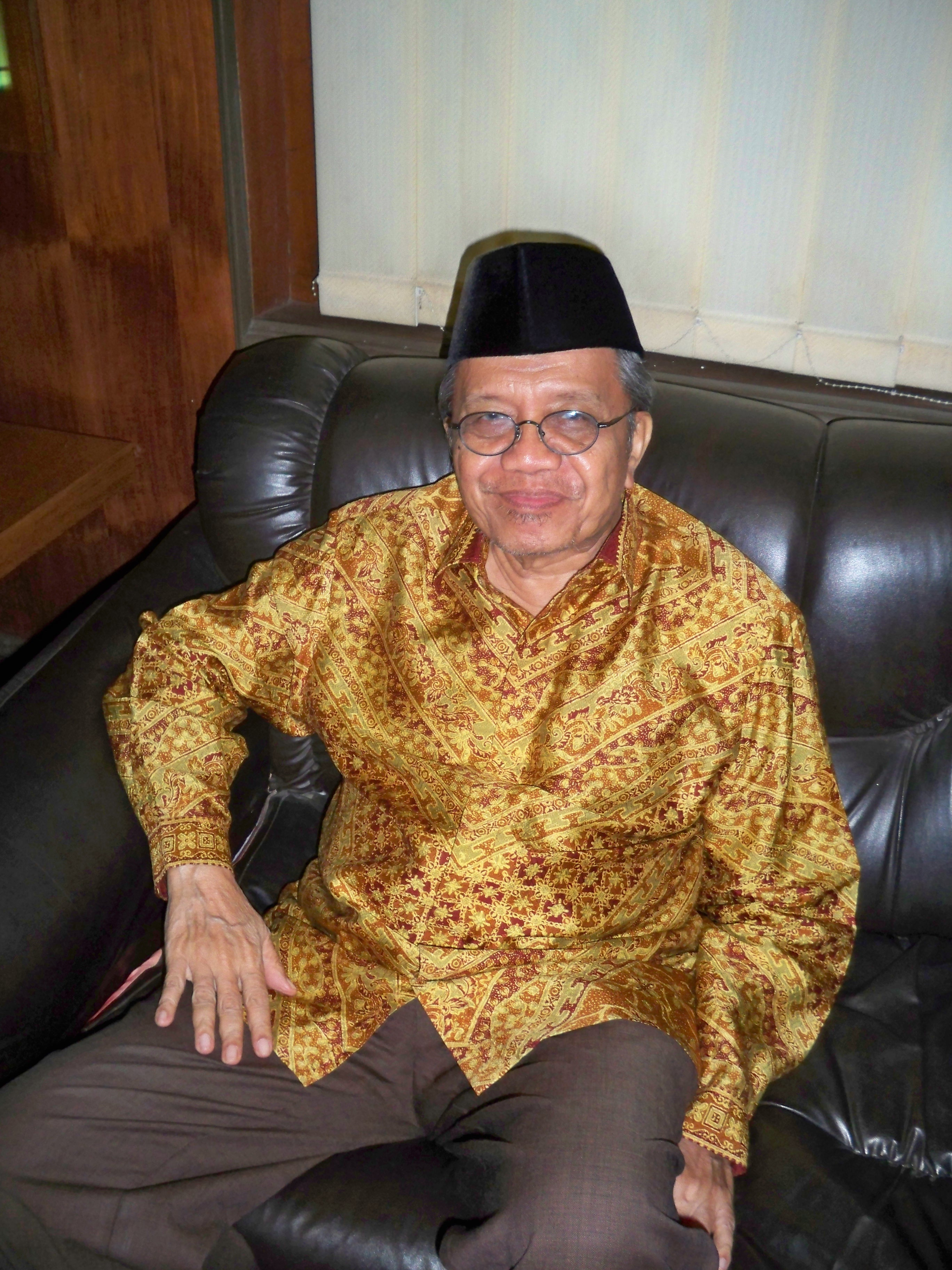
Taufik Ismail

- Chairil Anwar, famous poems: "Aku", "Krawang-Bekasi"
- Laksmi Pamuntjak, Indonesian poet, famous poetry collection: The Anagram
- Leon Agusta, Indonesian poet
- Taufik Ismail, famous poem: "Tirani"

== Religion ==
- Abdul Karim Amrullah, Islamic reformer
- Abdullah Ahmad, Islamic reformer
- Abdul Somad, Islamic preacher
- Ahmad Khatib, head of the Shafi'i school of law, Mecca
- Ahmad Syafi'i Maarif, Islamic scholar, former leader of Muhammadiyah
- Burhanuddin Ulakan, Shattari sheikh and Islamic propagator in Minangkabau region
- Burhanuddin Al-Helmy, Malaysian sheikh and pro-palestinian orrator
- Ilyas Yakoub, ulama, politician
- Ismail al-Minankabawi, pioneer of Naqshbandiyya-Khalidiyya in Southeast Asia
- Mahmud Yunus, Islamic scholar
- Muhammad Amrullah, Islamic scholar
- Sulaiman ar-Rasuli, ulama and founder of PERTI
- Tahir Jalaluddin, ulama in Malaysia and Singapore
- Tuanku Nan Renceh, ulama
- Tuanku Nan Tuo, ulama
- Tuanku Pasaman, ulama

== Singers ==
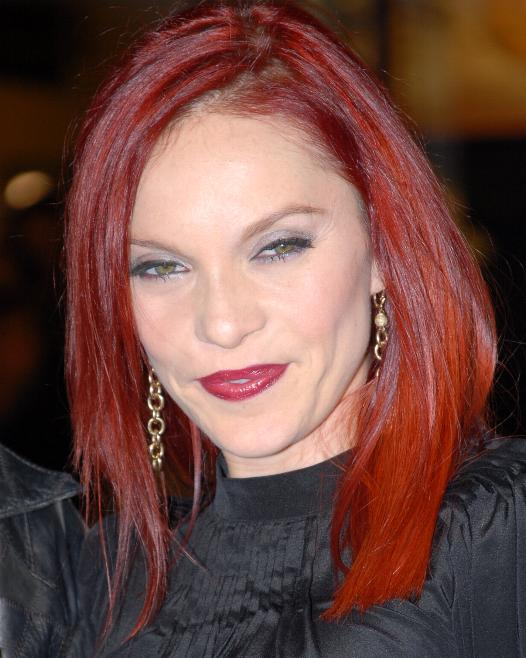
Carmit Bachar

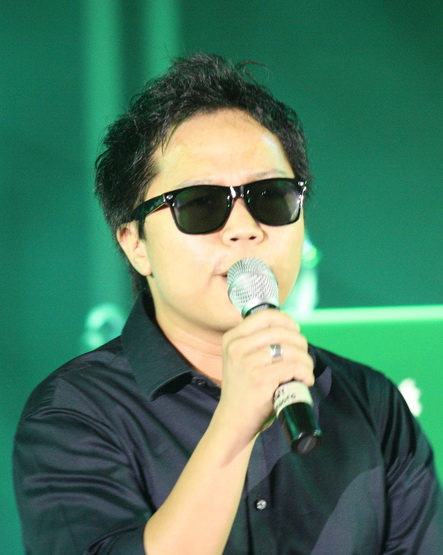
Sandhy Sondoro

- Afgansyah Reza, singer
- Aishah, singer
- Azmyl Yunor, singer-songwriter
- Carmit Bachar, pop singer
- Cita Citata, singer
- Dorce Gamalama, pop singer, actress, and presenter
- Fariz Rustam Munaf, pop singer
- Harry Roesli, singer-songwriter
- Hetty Koes Endang, pop singer
- Irwansyah, actor and singer
- Laila Sari, singer
- Naura Ayu, singer
- Nazril Irham, singer
- Nindy Ayunda, singer
- Sandhy Sondoro, singer-songwriter
- Sherina Munaf, singer-songwriter, actress
- Tulus, singer-songwriter
- Upiak Isil, singer, comedian
- Vidi Aldiano, pop singer

== Others ==
- Alexander Aan, atheist activist

== See also ==
- Overseas Minangkabau
- List of Acehnese people
- List of Batak people
- List of Bugis people
- List of Chinese Indonesians
- List of Javanese people
- List of Moluccan people
- List of Sundanese people
