= 2020 Arema F.C. season =

Arema F.C.
2020 season
- CEO: Agoes Soerjanto
- Head coach: Mario Gómez (until 3 August); Vacant (until 17 September); Carlos Oliviera (from 17 September)
- Stadium: Kanjuruhan Stadium
- Liga 1: Did not finish
- Piala Indonesia: Cancelled
- Top goalscorer: Kushedya Hari Yudo (2)
- Highest home attendance: 23,781 (vs. Persib, 8 March)
- Average home league attendance: 23,781
Home colours	Away colours	Third colours

The 2020 Arema F.C. season is Arema's 31st competitive season. The club will compete in Indonesia League 1 and Piala Indonesia. Arema Football Club a professional football club based in Malang, East Java, Indonesia. The season covers the period from 1 January 2020 to 20 January 2021.

== Squad information ==
=== Current squad ===
Note: Flags indicate national team as defined under FIFA eligibility rules; some limited exceptions apply. Players may hold more than one non-FIFA nationality.

No.	Pos.	Nation	Player
1	GK	IDN	Utam Rusdiana
4	DF	IDN	Syaiful Indra Cahya
5	DF	IDN	Bagas Adi
8	MF	BRA	Bruno Smith
10	FW	IDN	Muhammad Rafli
11	FW	IDN	Feby Eka Putra (on loan from Persija Jakarta)
12	MF	IDN	Hendro Siswanto (captain)
13	DF	IDN	Rizky Dwi Febrianto
14	MF	IDN	Jayus Hariono
16	FW	IDN	Ridwan Tawainella
19	MF	IDN	Hanif Sjahbandi
21	DF	IDN	Aji Saka
23	GK	IDN	Teguh Amiruddin

No.	Pos.	Nation	Player
26	DF	IDN	Taufik Hidayat
27	FW	IDN	Dedik Setiawan
31	GK	IDN	Andriyas Francisco
41	FW	IDN	Dendi Santoso (3rd captain)
44	DF	IDN	Nur Diansyah
56	FW	IDN	Titan Agung
87	DF	IDN	Johan Alfarizi (2nd captain)
88	MF	IDN	Vikrian Akbar
92	MF	IDN	Dave Mustaine
95	DF	BRA	Caio Ruan
96	GK	IDN	Kartika Ajie
99	FW	IDN	Kushedya Hari Yudo

== Transfers ==
=== In ===
No.	Pos	Player	Transferred From	Fee	Date	Source
5	DF	(Indonesia) Bagas Adi	(Indonesia) Bhayangkara	Free	7 January 2020	
42	DF	(Indonesia) Ganjar Mukti	(Indonesia) PSIS	Free	7 January 2020	
4	DF	(Indonesia) Syaiful Indra Cahya	(Indonesia) PSIM	Free	8 January 2020	
44	DF	(Indonesia) Nur Diansyah	(Indonesia) Borneo	Free	8 January 2020	
21	DF	(Indonesia) Aji Saka	Youth sector	Promoted	10 January 2020	
99	FW	(Indonesia) Kushedya Hari Yudo	(Indonesia) PSS	Free	10 January 2020	
92	MF	(Indonesia) Dave Mustaine	(Indonesia) PSS	Free	11 January 2020	
78	FW	(Indonesia) Mariando Uropmabin	(Indonesia) Semen Padang	Free	14 January 2020	
7	MF	(South Korea) Oh In-kyun	(Indonesia) Persipura	Free	15 January 2020	
26	DF	(Indonesia) Taufik Hidayat	(Indonesia) PSM	Free	15 January 2020	
77	FW	(Indonesia) Pandi Lestaluhu	(Indonesia) Kalteng Putra	Free	15 January 2020	
23	GK	(Indonesia) Teguh Amiruddin	(Indonesia) TIRA-Persikabo	Free	21 January 2020	
32	FW	(Argentina) Jonatan Bauman	(Malaysia) Kedah	Free	25 January 2020	
17	DF	(Uruguay) Matías Malvino	(Uruguay) Defensor Sporting	Free	30 January 2020	
43	DF	(Indonesia) Gitra Yuda Furton	(Indonesia) Martapura	Free	10 March 2020	
9	FW	(Brazil) Pedro Bartoli	(Portugal) G.D. Chaves U-19	Free	20 August 2020	
13	DF	(Brazil) Guilherme Grillo	(Brazil) Cuiabá Esporte Clube U-20	Free	20 August 2020	
13	DF	(Indonesia) Rizky Dwi Febrianto	Free agent	Free	14 September 2020	
95	DF	(Brazil) Caio Ruan	Free agent	Free	28 September 2020	
8	MF	(Brazil) Bruno Smith	(Brazil) Imperatriz	Free	21 October 2020	

=== Out ===
No.	Pos	Player	Transferred To	Fee	Date	Source
7	FW	(Indonesia) Ahmad Nur Hardianto	(Indonesia) Bhayangkara	Free	1 January 2020	
11	FW	(Indonesia) Rivaldi Bawuo	(Indonesia) Madura United	Free	1 January 2020	
21	FW	(Indonesia) Ricky Kayame	(Indonesia) Persita	Free	1 January 2020	
22	DF	(Indonesia) Rachmat Latief	Free agent	Free	1 January 2020	
23	DF	(Indonesia) Hamka Hamzah	(Indonesia) Persita	Free	1 January 2020	
37	DF	(Indonesia) Agil Munawar	Free agent	Free	1 January 2020	
77	MF	(Japan) Takafumi Akahoshi	-	Retired	1 January 2020	
18	DF	(Indonesia) Ricky Ohorella	(Indonesia) Semen Padang	Free	4 January 2020	
17	MF	(Indonesia) Zidane Pulanda	Free agent	Free	6 January 2020	
6	DF	(Indonesia) Ikhfanul Alam	(Indonesia) Badak Lampung	Free	8 January 2020	
8	MF	(Indonesia) Nasir	(Indonesia) Persebaya	Free	8 January 2020	
15	FW	(Indonesia) Sunarto	(Indonesia) Badak Lampung	Free	8 January 2020	
10	MF	(Mali) Makan Konaté	(Indonesia) Persebaya	Free	16 January 2020	
86	GK	(Indonesia) Sandy Firmansyah	(Indonesia) PSIM	Free	20 January 2020	
99	FW	(Netherlands) Sylvano Comvalius	(Indonesia) Persipura	Free	22 January 2020	
32	FW	(Argentina) Jonatan Bauman	(Argentina) Quilmes Atlético Club	Released	3 August 2020	
7	MF	(South Korea) Oh In-kyun	-	Retired	21 August 2020	
—	DF	(Brazil) Arthur Cunha	(Malta) Sliema Wanderers	Free	9 September 2020	
9	FW	(Brazil) Pedro Bartoli	Free agent	Free	14 September 2020	
—	DF	(Brazil) Guilherme Grillo	Free agent	Free	16 September 2020	
17	DF	(Uruguay) Matías Malvino	Free agent	Released	28 September 2020	
78	FW	(Indonesia) Mariando Uropmabin	Free agent	Released	5 October 2020	
43	DF	(Indonesia) Gitra Yuda Furton	Free agent	Released	4 November 2020	

=== Loan In ===
No.	Pos	Player	Loaned From	Start	End	Source
33	FW	(Argentina) Elías Alderete	(Argentina) Chacarita Juniors	28 January 2020	28 September 2020	
11	FW	(Indonesia) Feby Eka Putra	(Indonesia) Persija	25 February 2020	31 December 2020	
38	DF	(Indonesia) Mifathul Ikhsan	(Indonesia) Borneo	27 February 2020	4 November 2020	

=== Loan Out ===
No.	Pos	Player	Loaned To	Start	End	Source
—	DF	(Brazil) Arthur Cunha	(Indonesia) Persipura	22 January 2020	9 September 2020	
15	DF	(Indonesia) Alfin Tuasalamony	(Indonesia) Madura United	22 February 2020	31 December 2020	
42	DF	(Indonesia) Ganjar Mukti	(Indonesia) Persiraja	22 February 2020	31 December 2020	
77	FW	(Indonesia) Pandi Lestaluhu	(Indonesia) Mitra Kukar	22 February 2020	31 December 2020	

== Review and events ==
The season featured a seven-month hiatus from March to October 2020 after the outbreak of the coronavirus pandemic. On 29 September 2020, PSSI has officially decided to postpone the continuation of Liga 1 for a month after coordinating with Kemenpora and PT LIB because the police have not given permission to the crowd. PSSI stated on 29 October 2020 that the competition will not be held until 2021. But it's still not clear whether this season will continue or cancelled. They determined that the Liga 1 will be held again in February 2021 and scheduled to finish in July 2021. On 20 January 2021, the results of the exco PSSI meeting stated that the League 1 competition was officially canceled.

On 3 August 2020, Head coach Mario Gómez resigned because disagree with SKEP 48 and 53 PSSI issues, which were taken into account during the COVID-19 pandemic. After Mario Gomez resigned, management handed over team leadership to the three assistant coaches. On 17 September 2020, Arema FC officially introduces the new head coach from Brazil Carlos Oliviera.

== Pre-seasons and friendlies ==
=== Friendlies ===
Date	Opponents	H / A	Result F–A	Scorers	Attendance
22 January 2020	Bintang Semeru	N	10–1	Rafli (2), Kushedya (2), In-kyun, Hendro, Dave, Hanif, Titan, Ridwan	N/A
5 February 2020	Semeru FC	H	1–1	Rafli 17'	N/A
23 February 2020	Barito Putera	H	3–0	Dave 5', Bauman 12', Titan 82'	19,600
15 August 2020	Arema U20s	H	5–2	Dedik, Dendi, Syaiful, Alderete, Titan	0
29 August 2020	Kaki Mas Dampit	H	7–0	Dedik, Alderete, Kushedya, Titan, Ridwan, Bartoli (2)	0
10 September 2020	PON Jatim	H	2–0	Ridwan 2', Rafli 84' (pen.)	0
17 September 2020	Martapura	H	Match cancelled due to safety reasons		
16 October 2020	Arema U20s	H	8–0	Rizky 20', Jayus 25', Dave 37', Bagas 39', Kushedya (2) 57', 76', Titan (2) 59', 62'	0
21 October 2020	Madura United	H	4–3	Dedik 9', Caio 19', Seiya 62', Kushedya 73'	0

=== East Java Governor Cup ===
==== Group stage ====
Date	Opponents	H / A	Result F–A	Scorers	Attendance	Group position
11 February 2020	Sabah	H	2–0	In-kyun 3', Randy 33' (o.g.)	6,748	2nd
13 February 2020	Persela	H	3–1	Kushedya 23', Bauman 52', Alderete 76'	5,600	2nd
15 February 2020	Persija	H	1–1	Alfarizi 81'	22,000	2nd

Pos	Team	Pld	W	D	L	GF	GA	GD	Pts	Qualification
1	Persija	3	2	1	0	7	2	+5	7	Knockout stage
2	Arema (H)	3	2	1	0	6	2	+4	7	Knockout stage
3	Sabah	3	0	1	2	2	6	−4	1	
4	Persela	3	0	1	2	4	9	−5	1	

Source: DetikSport
Rules for classification: 1) Points; 2) Head-to-head; 3) Goal difference; 4) Goal scored.
(H) Hosts

==== Knockout phase ====
Date	Round	Opponents	H / A	Result F–A	Scorers	Attendance
18 February 2020	Semi-finals	Persebaya	N	2–4	Alfarizi 3', Alderete 73'	0

== Match results ==
=== Liga 1 ===
==== Matches ====
Date	Opponents	H / A	Result F–A	Scorers	Attendance	League position
2 March 2020	TIRA-Persikabo	A	2–0	Kushedya (2) 5', 48'	6,098	3rd
8 March 2020	Persib	H	1–2	Alderete 45' (pen.)	23,781	7th
14 March 2020	PSIS	A	0–2		16,272	12th
3 April 2020	Borneo	H				
11 April 2020	Persebaya	A				
17 April 2020	Bhayangkara	H				
27 April 2020	Persik	A				
2 May 2020	Persija	H				
10 May 2020	Persipura	H				
16 May 2020	Persipura	H				
13 June 2020	Persiraja	A				
21 June 2020	PSS	A				
27 June 2020	Persita	H				
3 July 2020	Barito Putera	A				
9 July 2020	Madura United	H				
15 July 2020	Bali United	A				
19 July 2020	PSM	A				
24 July 2020	TIRA-Persikabo	H				
30 July 2020	Persib	A				
3 August 2020	PSIS	H				
9 August 2020	Borneo	A				
14 August 2020	Persebaya	H				
18 August 2020	Bhayangkara	A				
22 August 2020	Persik	H				
29 August 2020	Persija	A				
9 September 2020	Persipura	A				
16 September 2020	Persela	A				
20 September 2020	Persiraja	H				
27 September 2020	PSS	H				
3 October 2020	Persita	A				
15 October 2020	Barito Putera	H				
20 October 2020	Madura United	A				
25 October 2020	Bali United	H				
TBD	PSM	H				

==== League table ====
Pos	Team	Pld	W	D	L	GF	GA	GD	Pts
10	TIRA-Persikabo	3	1	1	1	3	3	0	4
11	Bhayangkara	3	0	3	0	3	3	0	3
12	Arema	3	1	0	2	3	4	−1	3
13	Persik	3	0	2	1	2	3	−1	2
14	Persita	3	0	2	1	2	4	−2	2

Source: Shopee Liga 1 2020, Soccerway
Rules for classification: 1) Points; 2) Head-to-head; 3) Goal difference; 4) Goals scored; 5) Drawing.

== Statistics ==
=== Squad appearances and goals ===
No.	Pos	Nat	Player	Total		Liga 1		Piala Indonesia	
No.	Pos	Nat	Player	Apps	Goals	Apps	Goals	Apps	Goals
Goalkeepers
1	GK	(Indonesia) IDN	Utam Rusdiana	0	0	0	0	0	0
23	GK	(Indonesia) IDN	Teguh Amiruddin	3	0	3	0	0	0
31	GK	(Indonesia) IDN	Andriyas Francisco	0	0	0	0	0	0
96	GK	(Indonesia) IDN	Kartika Ajie	0	0	0	0	0	0
Defenders
4	DF	(Indonesia) IDN	Syaiful Indra Cahya	2	0	2	0	0	0
5	DF	(Indonesia) IDN	Bagas Adi	2	0	2	0	0	0
13	DF	(Indonesia) IDN	Rizky Dwi Febrianto	0	0	0	0	0	0
21	DF	(Indonesia) IDN	Aji Saka	0	0	0	0	0	0
26	DF	(Indonesia) IDN	Taufik Hidayat	2	0	1+1	0	0	0
44	DF	(Indonesia) IDN	Nur Diansyah	2	0	1+1	0	0	0
87	DF	(Indonesia) IDN	Johan Alfarizi	3	0	3	0	0	0
95	DF	(Brazil) BRA	Caio Ruan	0	0	0	0	0	0
Midfielders
8	MF	(Brazil) BRA	Bruno Smith	0	0	0	0	0	0
12	MF	(Indonesia) IDN	Hendro Siswanto	3	0	3	0	0	0
14	MF	(Indonesia) IDN	Jayus Hariono	0	0	0	0	0	0
19	MF	(Indonesia) IDN	Hanif Sjahbandi	2	0	1+1	0	0	0
88	MF	(Indonesia) IDN	Vikrian Akbar	0	0	0	0	0	0
92	MF	(Indonesia) IDN	Dave Mustaine	1	0	0+1	0	0	0
Forwards
10	FW	(Indonesia) IDN	Muhammad Rafli	3	0	1+2	0	0	0
11	FW	(Indonesia) IDN	Feby Eka Putra	2	0	2	0	0	0
16	FW	(Indonesia) IDN	Ridwan Tawainella	1	0	1	0	0	0
27	FW	(Indonesia) IDN	Dedik Setiawan	0	0	0	0	0	0
41	FW	(Indonesia) IDN	Dendi Santoso	3	0	3	0	0	0
56	FW	(Indonesia) IDN	Titan Agung	1	0	0+1	0	0	0
99	FW	(Indonesia) IDN	Kushedya Hari Yudo	3	2	3	2	0	0
Players transferred or loaned out during the season the club
7	MF	(South Korea) KOR	Oh In-kyun	3	0	3	0	0	0
17	DF	(Uruguay) URU	Matías Malvino	2	0	2	0	0	0
32	FW	(Argentina) ARG	Jonatan Bauman	2	0	1+1	0	0	0
33	FW	(Argentina) ARG	Elías Alderete	2	1	1+1	1	0	0
38	DF	(Indonesia) IDN	Mifathul Ikhsan	0	0	0	0	0	0
43	DF	(Indonesia) IDN	Gitra Yuda Furton	0	0	0	0	0	0
78	FW	(Indonesia) IDN	Mariando Uropmabin	0	0	0	0	0	0

=== Top scorers ===
The list is sorted by shirt number when total goals are equal.

Rnk	Pos	No.	Player	Liga 1	Piala Indonesia	Total
1	FW	99	(Indonesia) Kushedya Hari Yudo	2	0	2
2	FW	33	(Argentina) Elías Alderete	1	0	1
Total				3	0	3
