= Suhaimi =

Suhaimi is an Asian name that may refer to

Given name

- Suhaimi Anak Sulau (born 1996), Bruneian football defender now known as Helmi Wafiy Ammar Naim
- Suhaimi Hassan (died 2013), Malaysian politician
- Suhaimi Kamaruddin, Malaysian politician
- Suhaimi Sulaiman (born 1962), Malaysian news anchor and media strategist
- Suhaimi Yusof (born 1969), Singaporean actor, comedian, entertainer and radio personality

Patronymic or surname

- Abdul Latiff Suhaimi (born 1989), Malaysian football player
- Azim Izamuddin Suhaimi (born 1997), Bruneian footballer
- Hasnul Suhaimi (born 1957), Indonesian telecommunications executive
- Mohamad Faiz Suhaimi (born 1992), Malaysian football defender
- Mohd Iqbal Suhaimi (born 1984), Malaysian football player
- Muhaimin Suhaimi (born 1995), Singaporean football player
- Sahil Suhaimi (born 1992), Singaporean football player
