= 1971 Merpati Nusantara Airlines Vickers Viscount crash =

Aviation accident

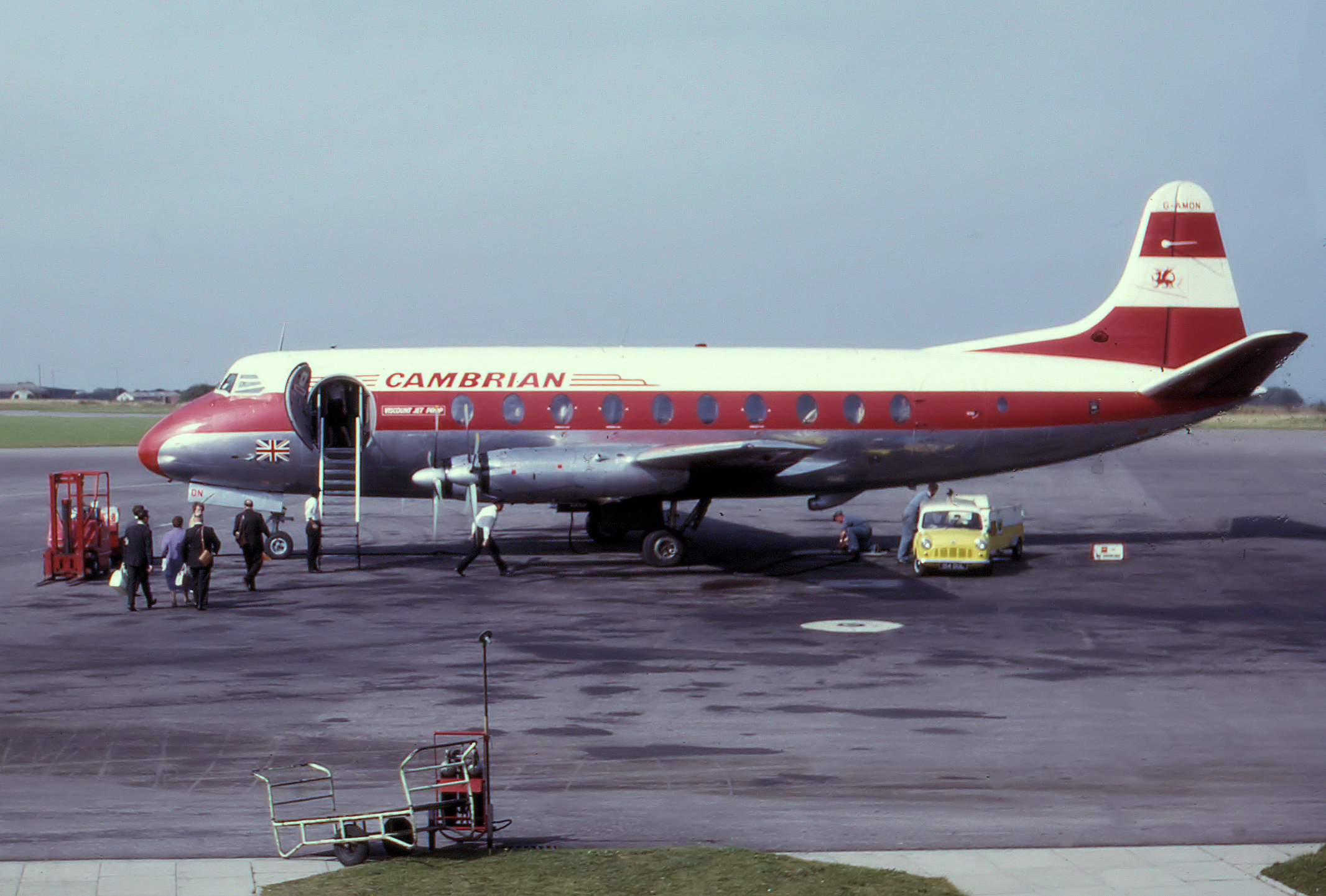
- A Viscount 701 of Cambrian Airways, similar to the aircraft involved in the accident

Accident
- Date: 10 November 1971
- Summary: Controlled flight into terrain
- Site: Off Padang, West Sumatra, Indonesia

Aircraft
- Aircraft type: Vickers Viscount 828
- Aircraft name: Sabang
- Operator: Merpati Nusantara Airlines
- Registration: PK-MVS
- Flight origin: Kemayoran Airport, Jakarta, Indonesia
- Destination: Tabing Airport, Padang, Indonesia
- Occupants: 69
- Passengers: 62
- Crew: 7
- Fatalities: 69
- Survivors: 0

On 10 November 1971, a Merpati Nusantara Airlines Vickers Viscount, registration PK-MVS, crashed in the Indian Ocean off the coast of Padang, West Sumatra, Indonesia, after telling air traffic controllers they could not make their destination due to bad weather. All 69 people aboard the aircraft were killed in the crash. It remains the third worst Vickers Viscount accident.

== Accident ==
The aircraft was flying between Kemayoran Airport in Jakarta, and Tabing Airport, the then airport of Padang. Five minutes before it was scheduled to arrive at Tabing, air traffic controllers lost radio contact with the flight. Controllers at Talang Betutu Airport, Palembang, South Sumatra, reported the aircraft issued a distress signal. The flight crew reportedly said they could not land at Padang because of poor weather and bad visibility. The aircraft subsequently crashed into the Indian Ocean, killing all 62 passengers and seven crew aboard the aircraft.

== Passengers and crew ==
All the passengers aboard the aircraft were Indonesian nationals, except for a West German doctor and his wife, and a British helicopter pilot who was employed in Indonesia. Eight children were also aboard the flight. Among the victims was the Indonesian renowned choreographer of Minangkabau descent Huriah Adam.

| Nationality | Fatalities | | Total |
| Nationality | Passengers | Crew | Total |
|---|---|---|---|
| Indonesia | 59 | 7 | 66 |
| West Germany | 2 | 0 | 2 |
| Great Britain | 1 | 0 | 1 |
| Total | 62 | 7 | 69 |

== Aftermath ==
Three days after the accident, pieces of the wreckage were found floating 75 miles off Sumatra, Indonesia. Fisherman found seats of the aircraft between the Beringin and Katang-Katang islands. An Indonesian Navy boat also recovered clothes and uninflated life rafts.

== See also ==
- List of accidents and incidents involving the Vickers Viscount
- List of accidents and incidents involving commercial aircraft
- 1971 in aviation
