= Sutan Sjahrir Air Force Base =

Military airport in Padang, West Sumatra, Indonesia

Sutan Sjahrir Air Force Base Pangkalan Udara Sutan Sjahrir
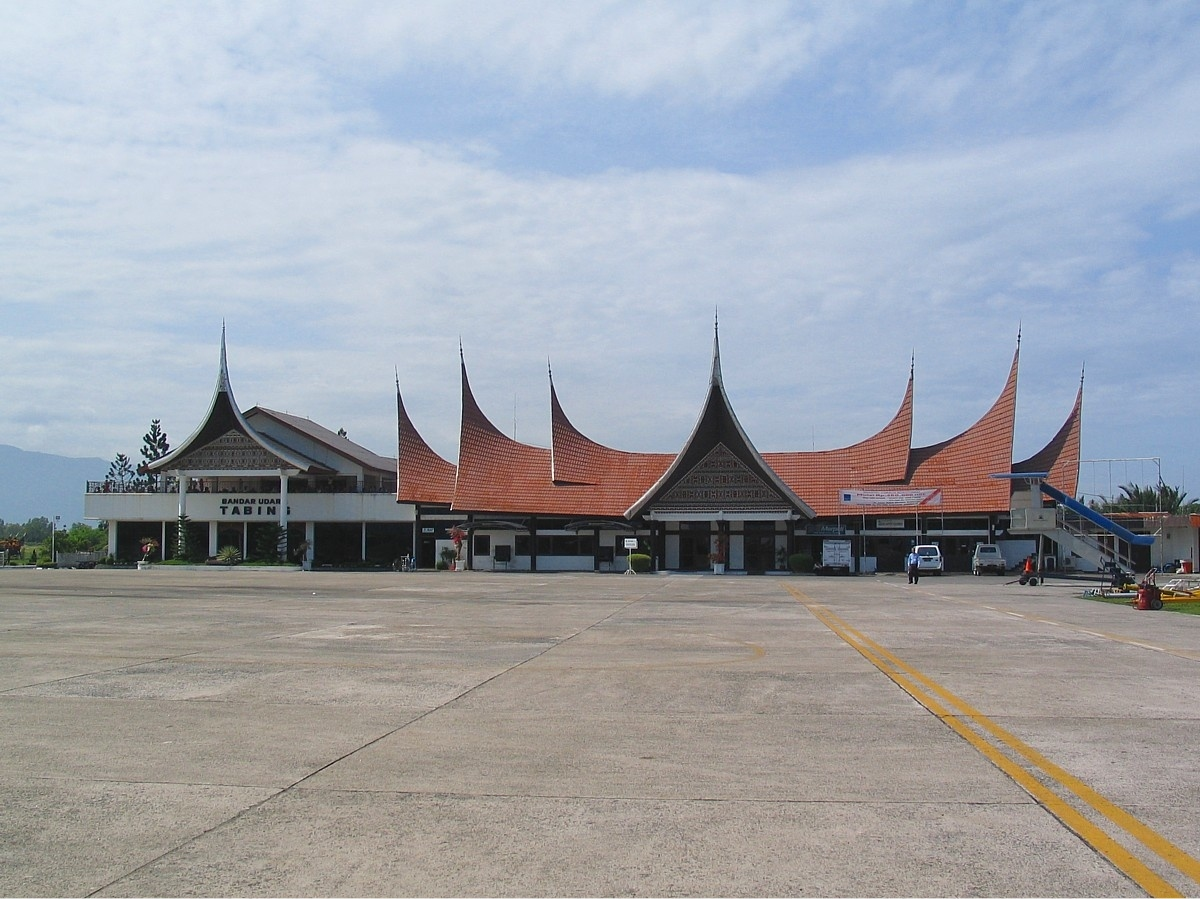
- Tabing Airport terminal (2004)
- IATA: ~~PDG~~; ICAO: WIMG

Summary
- Airport type: Military
- Operator: Government
- Location: Nanggalo, Padang, West Sumatra, Indonesia
- Passenger services ceased: 21 July 2005
- Elevation AMSL: 3 m / 9 ft
- Coordinates: 0.8807°S 100.3539°E

Map
- Location in Sumatra

Runways
Direction	Length		Surface
Direction	m	ft	Surface
16/34	2,200	7,217	Concrete
- Source: DAFIF

Sutan Sjahrir Air Force Base, formerly Tabing Airport (IATA: ~~PDG~~, ICAO: WIMG), is a military air base in Padang, Indonesia. Tabing Airport was West Sumatra's primary airport for civil aviation prior to the opening of Minangkabau International Airport on 22 July 2005, with the last takeoff on 21 July 2005 done by a Batavia Air's Boeing 737 bound for Jakarta with all of its passengers were given farewell souvenirs by the airport. Tabing Airport is now used by the Indonesian Air Force. It has been renamed after Sutan Sjahrir, Indonesia's first prime minister.

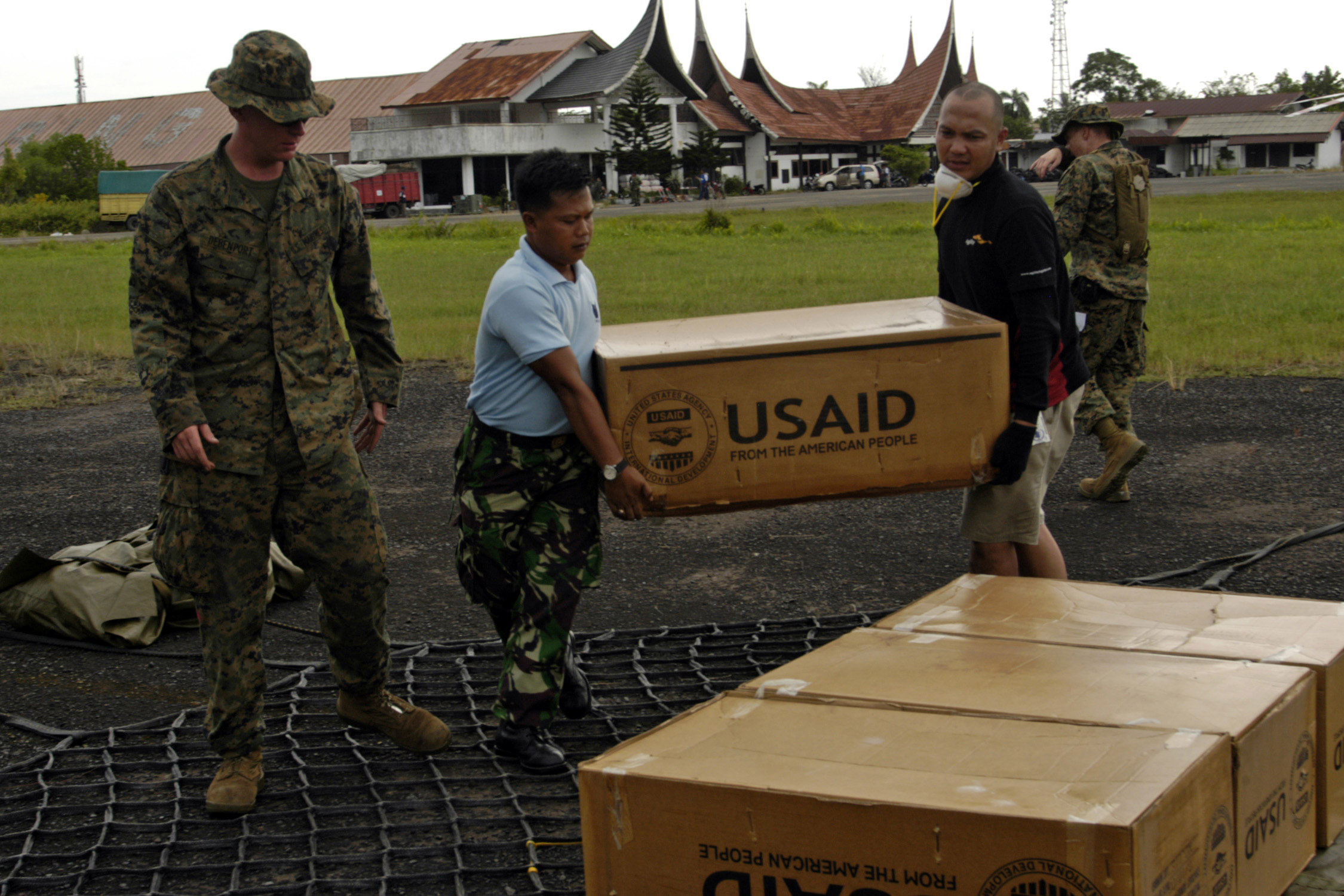
Workers loading a cargo net of supplies from USAID following the 2009 Sumatra earthquakes, with the airport's former terminal visible in the background

== Former airlines and destinations ==
=== Passenger ===
Airlines	Destinations
Merpati Nusantara Airlines	Medan, Batam

== Incidents and accidents ==
- On 10 November 1971, a Merpati Nusantara Airlines Vickers Viscount PK-MVS from Jakarta crashed into the sea 75 miles (121 km) off Padang, killing all 69 people on board.
- On 13 October 2012, a Sriwijaya Air Boeing 737, operating as Sriwijaya Air Flight 21 bound for Minangkabau from Medan, accidentally landed at the airport. None of its 96 passengers and 4 crew were injured, and both pilots were subsequently suspended and questioned by the NTSC.
