= Huriah Adam =

Indonesian dance artist

Huriah Adam (born in Padang Panjang, West Sumatra, October 6, 1936 – died in Indian Ocean, November 10, 1971) was a famous dance artist from West Sumatra.

Huriah was the daughter of a modern Minangkabau Islamic cleric from Padang Panjang, Sheikh Adam Balai-Balai and his wife Fatimah. Sheikh Adam established a public school for girls, and supported the development of his children's artistic talents, including Huriah. Huriah received tutelage from Minangkabau dance and martial arts experts since she was a child.

Later in her life, Huriah became famous for choreographing experimental dances in an intercultural dance workshop at the Jakarta Arts Center, Taman Ismail Marzuki, in which she incorporated many traditional Minangkabau dance and drama movements, such as from silat and randai. The new innovative forms of dance movements then spread to many Minangkabau dance studios and are often taught in schools, both in the capital city of Jakarta or in West Sumatra. Aside from being a dancer, she was also a painter and sculptor, in which some of her works were collected by art lovers and some also become monuments in several places in West Sumatra.

Huriah was 35 years old when she died in an airplane accident on November 10, 1971, when the plane crashed into the sea off the coast of West Sumatra.

== See also ==
- List of Minangkabau people
- Randai
