= Said Djauharsjah Jenie =

Indonesian scientist (1950–2008)

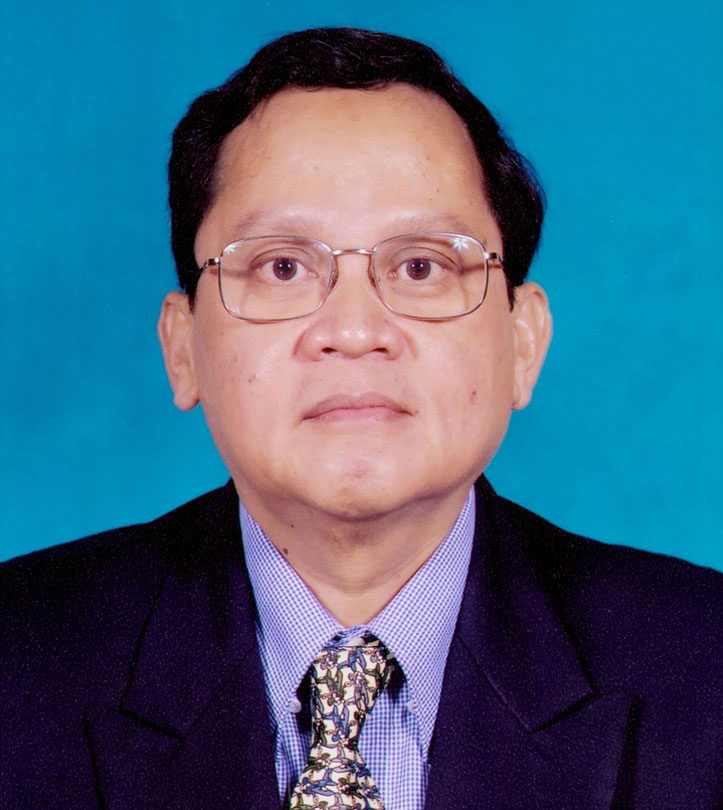
- Born: August 22, 1950; Surakarta, Central Java
- Died: July 11, 2008 (aged 57); Bandung, West Java
- Education: Massachusetts Institute of Technology (MIT), United States; Technical University of Delft, Netherlands
- Occupations: Scientist, Education
- Known for: Head BPPT
- Spouse: Sadarijah
- Children: Asih Nurul Sadarijah Jenie and Gita Ismailia Isbandiyah Jenie
- Parent(s): Nahar Jenie (father); Isbandiyah (mother)

Said Djauharsjah Jenie (22 August 1950, Surakarta – July 11, 2008, Bandung) was an Indonesian scientist and teacher. He was the head of The Agency for the Assessment and Application of Technology (AAAT) from 2006 until he died in 2008. He was a member of the Board of Commissioners PT. Indonesian Aerospace.

Said Jenie was one of the key figures behind the success of the maiden flight of aircraft N-250, the first commercial aircraft entirely designed and made in Indonesia. He worked as an educator in the Department of Aerospace Engineering at ITB (ITB) as Professor Prodi of Engineering Flight. Said was a researcher at the Massachusetts Institute of Technology (MIT) and NASA in the United States.

Jenie died in Bandung Hospital on July 11, 2008, due to heart disease. He was buried in Family Cemetery Sewu, Bantul, Yogyakarta.

== Family ==
Jenie married Sadarijah, with whom he had two daughters, Asih Nurul Sadarijah and Gita Ismailia Isbandiyah. Said Jenie was the son of Jenie Nahar Minangkabau and Isbandiyah.

== Education ==
He studied mechanical engineering at Bandung Institute of Technology, graduating in 1969. He holds a master's degree in Aeronautics and Astronautics from the Technical University of Delft, Netherlands (1978). He holds a doctorate in astrodynamics in Massachusetts Institute of Technology (MIT), United States (1982)

== Career ==
- Chief of Flight Test Center N-250 (1995)
- Deputy Head of BPPT Design, Build, Industry Technology and Engineering (1998)
- Member of the Board of Commissioners of PT. Indonesian Aerospace (2002)
- Head of the Agency for the Assessment and Application of Technology (2006)
- Head of Sumo Community

== Awards ==
- ASEAN Engineering Awards (1994)
- Bintang Jasa Utama (2007)
