= Ahmad Fuadi =

Indonesian Writer

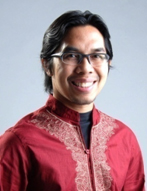
- Born: 30 December 1972 (age 53); Maninjau, West Sumatra, Indonesia
- Education: Padjadjaran University
- Occupations: Novelist, social entrepreneur, author, writer
- Spouse: Danya Dewanti
- Writing career
- Pen name: A. Fuadi
- Genre: Coming-of-age story
- Notable work: Negeri 5 Menara (The Land of 5 Towers)
- Website: afuadi.com

Ahmad Fuadi (born 30 December 1972) is an Indonesian writer, novelist and social entrepreneur. His debut novel Negeri 5 Menara (The Land of 5 Towers) broke the publisher's sales record (Gramedia Pustaka Utama) for the last 37 years. Negeri 5 Menara is the first part of the Negeri 5 Menara trilogy, followed by Ranah 3 Warna (The Earth of 3 Colors), and Rantau 1 Muara" "Negeri 5 Menara" was brought into wide-screen version and listed as one of the most watched Indonesian movies in the year of 2012. He's also well known for achieving 9 overseas scholarships.

== Education & Work ==
Fuadi studied at Pondok Modern Darussalam Gontor, where he was introduced to a powerful mantra "Man Jadda Wajada" (He who gives his all will surely succeed) in his first day. He then went to Padjajaran University, majoring International Relations. During his last semester in Padjadjaran University, he got a scholarship from the National University of Singapore and spent a semester there. Upon graduating with a degree in International Relations from Padjadjaran University, he became a journalist for Tempo magazine. His first class in journalism was done in reporting assignments under the guidance of senior Tempo journalists. In 1999, he received a Fulbright scholarship to take his master's degree at the School of Media and Public Affairs, George Washington University, USA. While studying, he and his wife Yayi were also Tempo correspondents and reporters for Voice of America (VOA). They reported on historical news, such as the 9-11 tragedy, straight from the Pentagon, White House, and Capitol Hill. In 2004, he received the Chevening Award scholarship to study documentary films at Royal Holloway, University of London. He has had opportunities to live and study in Canada, Singapore, USA, and the UK.

== Achievements ==
- International Education Program, CWY, Montreal, Canada, 1995 – 1996
- SIF-ASEAN Visiting Student Fellowship, National University of Singapore, 1997
- Indonesian Cultural Foundation Inc Award, 2000 – 2001
- Columbian College of Arts and Sciences Award, The George Washington University, 2000 – 2001 The Ford Foundation Award 1999–2000
- CASE Media Fellowship, University of Maryland, College Park, 2002
- Fulbright Scholarship, MA in Media and Public Affairs, The George Washington University, Washington DC, 1999–2001
- British Chevening Scholarship, MA in Media Arts, Royal Holloway, University of London, UK, 2004 – 2005
- Khatulistiwa Literary Award 2010, Long List
- The Most Favorite Fiction Writer of the Year, Indonesian Readers Award 2010
- The Best Fiction Novel & The Best Fiction Writer, awarded by the National Library of the Republic of Indonesia, 2011
- Liputan 6 Award SCTV for the Education & Motivation Category, 2011
- Resident Writer, Lake Como – Italy, awarded by the Rockefeller Foundation, 2012
- The National Intellectual Property Rights Award, for the Novel Category, awarded by the Directorate Generale of Intellectual Property Rights, 2013
- Artist in Residence, University of California, Berkeley, USA, 2014

== International Events ==
- Frankfurt Book Fair, Germany, 2012
- Singapore Writers Festival, Singapore, 2012
- Makassar International Writers Festival, Indonesia, 2012
- Kuala Lumpur International Book Fair, Malaysia, 2011
- Ubud Writers Festival, Indonesia, 2011

== Social works ==
With his wife Danya "Yayi" Dewanti, Fuadi founded Komunitas Menara, a volunteer-based social organization which aims to provide free schools, libraries, clinics and soup kitchens for the less fortunate. Up until now, Komunitas Menara has already built 5 free pre-schools throughout Indonesia.

== Bibliography ==
=== Novels ===
- Negeri 5 Menara (Gramedia Pustaka Utama, 2009), translated to Bahasa Melayu (PTS Litera), English (Gramedia Pustaka Utama) and Macedonian (Prozart Media)
- Ranah 3 Warna (Gramedia Pustaka Utama, 2011), translated to Bahasa Melayu (PTS Litera) & English (on going)
- Rantau 1 Muara (Gramedia Pustaka Utama, April 2013)
- Anak Rantau (Falcon Publishing, July 2017)
- Merdeka Sejak Hati (Gramedia Pustaka Utama, May 2019)
- Buya Hamka (Falcon Publishing, December 2021)
- Hamba Sang Maha Cahaya (Buku Republika, 2023)

=== Man Jadda Wajada Series ===
- Man Jadda Wajada 1: Berjalan Menembus Batas (Bentang Pustaka, 2012)
- Man Jadda Wajada 2: Menjadi Guru Inspiratif (Bentang Pustaka, 2012)
- Man Jadda Wajada 3: Berjuang di Rantau (Bentang Pustaka, 2013)

=== Others ===
- Rahasia Penulis Hebat: Menciptakan Karakter Tokoh (co-writer) (Gramedia Pustaka Utama, 2010)
- Dari Datuk ke Sakura Emas (co-writer) (Bentang Pustaka, 2011)
- Rindu Purnama (co-writer) (Bentang Pustaka, 2011)
- 131 Pintu Cahaya dari Timur (Gramedia Pustaka Utama, 2014)
- Beasiswa 5 Benua (Gramedia Pustaka Utama, 2014)
- Ramadhan Under Cover (contributor) (Gramedia Pustaka Utama, 2014)
- Cerita Cita Indonesia, 40 Esai Terpilih (contributor) (Gramedia Pustaka Utama, 2015)
- A Half-hearted Decision in Moving Worlds (Journal of Transcultural Writing, Volume 15 Number 1, 2015)
- Bertualang ke 5 Benua (co-writer) (Gramedia Pustaka Utama, 2016)
- Daily Dose of Shine (Gramedia Pustaka Utama, 2018)
- Ayo Berlatih Silat (BIP, 2018)
- Daily Dose of Light (Gramedia Pustaka Utama, 2019)

== Filmography ==
- Negeri 5 Menara (creative consultant & writer of original story) (Millions Pictures and KG, 2012)
- Negeri 5 Menara (the series) (creative consultant & writer of original story) (Maxstream, 2019)
- Ranah 3 Warna (creative consultant & writer of original story) (MNC Pictures, 2022)
- Anak Rantau (creative consultant, script writer and writer of original story) (on going)
