= Matías Malvino =

Uruguayan footballer (born 1992)

Personal information
- Full name: Matías Malvino
- Date of birth: 20 January 1992 (age 34)
- Place of birth: Montevideo, Uruguay
- Height: 1.88 m (6 ft 2 in)
- Position: Centre back

Team information
- Current team: Basáñez

Youth career
- Defensor Sporting

Senior career*
Years	Team	Apps	(Gls)
2012–2014	Defensor Sporting	44	(0)
2014–2016	FC Lugano	37	(3)
2015	→ Club Nacional (loan)	6	(0)
2016–2017	Club Nacional	0	(0)
2017	→ Racing Club (loan)	26	(1)
2018–2019	Municipal	6	(1)
2019	F.C. Chiasso	0	(0)
2019–2020	Defensor Sporting	11	(1)
2020	Arema F.C.	2	(0)
2021–2022	Cerrito	0	(0)
2022	Miramar Misiones	4	(0)
2022	C.S.D.Villa Española	8	(0)
2023–	Basáñez	0	(0)
- * Club domestic league appearances and goals as of 17 September 2022

Matías Malvino (born 20 January 1992) is an Uruguayan professional footballer who plays as a centre back for Segunda División Amateur club Basáñez.

== Honours ==
=== Club ===
Lugano

- Swiss Challenge League: 2014–15

Nacional

- Uruguayan Primera División: 2016
