= Yurdi Yasmi =

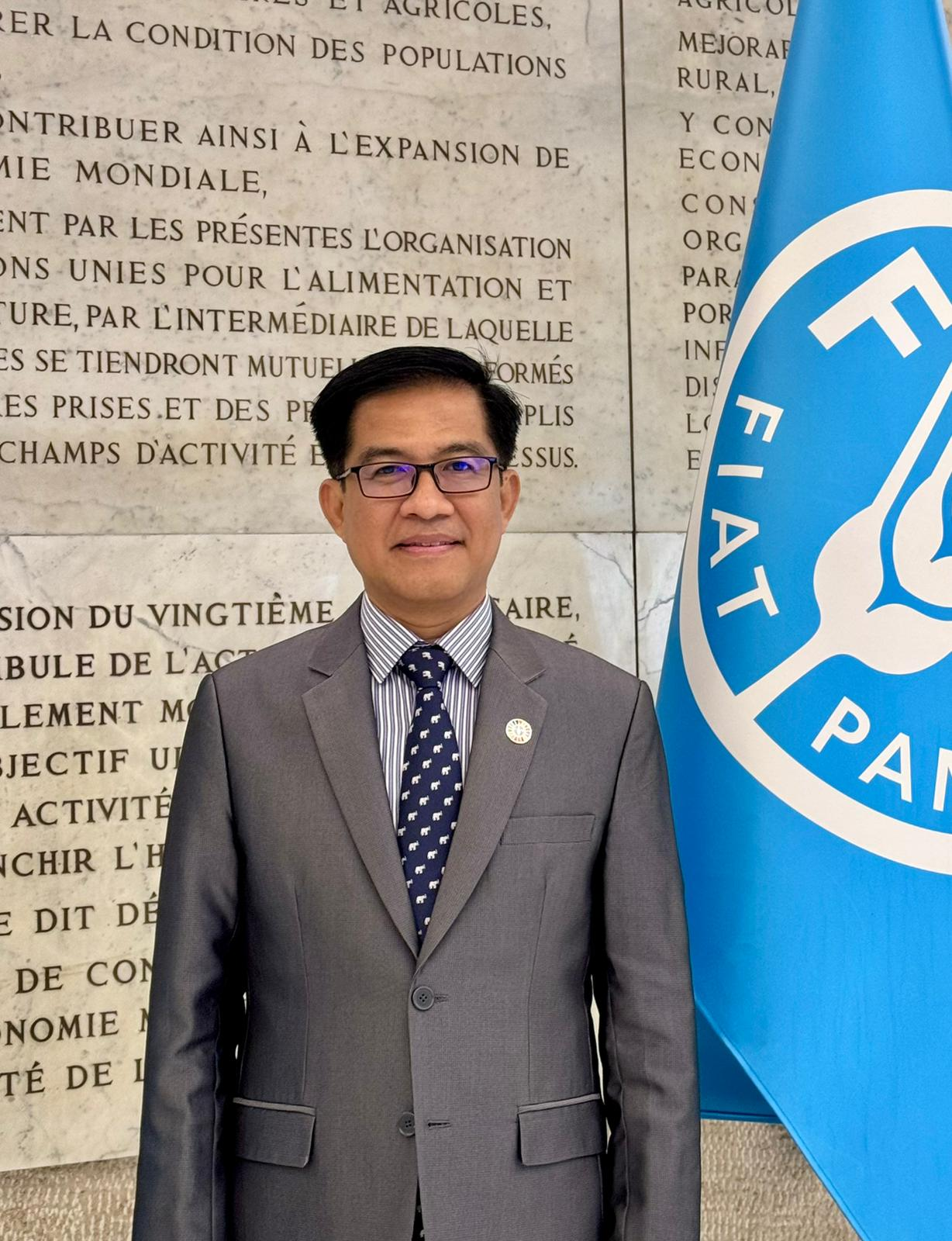
Yurdi Yasmi, 2024

Yurdi Yasmi is an Indonesian agriculture and forestry expert who is the director of the Plant Production and Protection Division at the Food and Agriculture Organization of the United Nations (FAO) based in the headquarters of FAO in Rome, Italy. He was previously the FAO's special coordinator for Plant Production and Protection Division (NSP), the FAO's deputy regional representative for Africa cum the FAO's representative to Ghana, as well as the FAO's coordinator for sustainable agriculture and forest policy officer for Asia and the Pacific.

Yasmi has worked for in the International Rice Research Institute (IRRI) as the director for Southeast Asia, World Agroforestry Centre (ICRAF) as the coordinator for Mekong region, the Center for People and Forests (RECOFTC) as the director for research and capacity building, and the Center for International Forestry Research (CIFOR) as a scientist.

== Early life and education ==
Yurdi Yasmi was born in Jorong Tanjung Jati, Nagari VII Koto Talago, Lima Puluh Kota Regency, on July 11, 1974, to Yasmi and Yuminas, both of whom were high school teachers. He is the second of four siblings. He is married to Inike Widyanti and they have a son.

Yurdi spent his childhood and teenage years in his hometown in West Sumatra. After completing elementary school in Tanjung Jati, he continued to SMP Negeri Limbanang (1989–1991). He then attended SMA Negeri 2 Payakumbuh in Limbanang, now known as SMA 1 Suliki (1991–1993). During high school, he participated in the America Field Service (AFS) exchange program and lived in Sydney, Australia for a year.

Yurdi pursued his undergraduate studies at the Faculty of Forestry, Bogor Agricultural University (IPB), graduating in 1998. In 1997, he represented his university as a National Outstanding Student, competition (known as Siswa Telandan), achieving second place at national level. He completed his Master's (2002) and Ph.D. (2007) degrees at Wageningen University, Netherlands. There, he graduated with honors (cum laude).

== Career ==
Yasmi started his career as a researcher at the Center for International Forestry Research (CIFOR) where he engaged in global research programme on sustainable forest management. After several years of working at CIFOR he continued his MSc and PhD study in Wageningen, the Netherlands from 2000 to 2007. Then, he worked for the Center for People and Forests (RECOFTC) in Bangkok progressively as senior programme officer and then became a director. After that, he joined the World Agroforestry Centre (ICRAF) as the coordinator for Mekong based in Hanoi, Vietnam.

He joined the Food and Agriculture Organization of the United Nations (FAO) in 2013 as the coordinator for sustainable agriculture and forestry based in FAO regional office for Asia and the Pacific in Bangkok. After 6.5 years he joined the International Rice Research Institute (IRRI) as the director for Southeast Asia. In early 2021, Yasmi returned to FAO and worked as the deputy regional representative for Africa and at the same time served as the FAO representative to Ghana. In late 2023, he moved to FAO headquarters in Rome as the special coordinator for plant production and protection. In November 2024, he was promoted as the director, Plant Production and Protection division, at FAO.

Yasmi has published over 70 publication in international journals, books and book chapters.

== Awards ==
In 2022, he received the Alumni Award from Bogor Agriculture University, IPB. And in 2015, Yasmi received the Wanabakti Pertama Award from IPB as an outstanding alumnus who has brought honor to his alma mater.
