= Mifathul Ikhsan =

Indonesian footballer

Personal information
- Full name: Muhammad Mifathul Ikhsan
- Date of birth: 18 February 2000 (age 26)
- Place of birth: Penajam North Paser, Indonesia
- Height: 1.70 m (5 ft 7 in)
- Position: Right back

Youth career
- 2015–2018: Penajam Utama
- 2018–2019: Borneo

Senior career*
| Years | Team | Apps | (Gls) |
| 2019–2023 | Borneo | 6 | (0) |
| 2020 | → Arema (loan) | 0 | (0) |
| 2021 | → Rans Cilegon (loan) | 0 | (0) |
| 2021 | → Persijap Jepara (loan) | 2 | (0) |
| 2022 | → Persijap Jepara (loan) | 0 | (0) |
- * Club domestic league appearances and goals as of 30 November 2021

Muhammad Mifathul Ikhsan (born on 18 February 2000) is an Indonesian professional footballer who plays as a right back.

== Club career ==
=== Borneo ===
In 2019, Ikhsan signed with Indonesian Liga 1 club Borneo. He made his first-team debut on 20 November 2019 in a match against PSS Sleman at the Maguwoharjo Stadium, Sleman.

==== Arema (loan) ====
He was signed for Arema to play in the Liga 1 in the 2020 season, on loan from Borneo. This season was suspended on 27 March 2020 due to the COVID-19 pandemic. The season was abandoned and was declared void on 20 January 2021.

==== Rans Cilegon (loan) ====
In 2021, Ikhsan signed with Indonesian Liga 2 club Rans Cilegon, on loan from Borneo.

== Career statistics ==
=== Club ===
As of 30 November 2021

| Club | Season | League | | | Cup | | Continental | | Other | | Total | |
| Club | Season | Division | Apps | Goals | Apps | Goals | Apps | Goals | Apps | Goals | Apps | Goals |
|---|---|---|---|---|---|---|---|---|---|---|---|---|
| Borneo | 2019 | Liga 1 | 6 | 0 | 0 | 0 | – | | 0 | 0 | 6 | 0 |
| Borneo | 2020 | Liga 1 | 0 | 0 | 0 | 0 | – | | 0 | 0 | 0 | 0 |
| Borneo | 2021–22 | Liga 1 | 0 | 0 | 0 | 0 | – | | 1 (Note: Appearances in Menpora Cup.) | 0 | 1 | 0 |
| Borneo | 2022–23 | Liga 1 | 0 | 0 | 0 | 0 | – | | 0 | 0 | 0 | 0 |
| Arema (loan) | 2020 | Liga 1 | 0 | 0 | 0 | 0 | – | | 0 | 0 | 0 | 0 |
| RANS Cilegon (loan) | 2021 | Liga 2 | 0 | 0 | 0 | 0 | – | | 0 | 0 | 0 | 0 |
| Persijap Jepara (loan) | 2021 | Liga 2 | 2 | 0 | 0 | 0 | – | | 0 | 0 | 2 | 0 |
| Persijap Jepara (loan) | 2022 | Liga 2 | 0 | 0 | 0 | 0 | – | | 0 | 0 | 0 | 0 |
| Career total | | | 8 | 0 | 0 | 0 | 0 | 0 | 1 | 0 | 9 | 0 |
