= Mariando Uropmabin =

Indonesian footballer

Personal information
- Full name: Mariando Djonak Uropmabin
- Date of birth: 26 September 1995 (age 31)
- Place of birth: Pegunungan Bintang, Indonesia
- Height: 1.69 m (5 ft 7 in)
- Positions: Winger; forward

Team information
- Current team: Persigubin Bintang Mountains
- Number: 17

Youth career
- PPLP Papua
- 2014: Sriwijaya
- 2015: Semen Padang

Senior career*
Years	Team	Apps	(Gls)
2015	Semen Padang	0	(0)
2016	Sriwijaya	3	(0)
2017	Perseru Serui	32	(5)
2018	Barito Putera	0	(0)
2019	Semen Padang	13	(2)
2020	Arema	0	(0)
2021–2022	Persiba Balikpapan	6	(0)
2025–	Persigubin Bintang Mountains	7	(0)

International career
2011–2013	Indonesia U17	10	(0)
2013–2014	Indonesia U19	6	(0)
- * Club domestic league appearances and goals as of 22:07, 30 April 2025 (UTC)

Mariando Djonak Uropmabin (born 26 September 1995) is an Indonesian professional footballer who plays as a winger for Liga 4 club Persigubin Bintang Mountains.

== Club career ==
=== Sriwijaya ===
Mariando made his professional debut with Sriwijaya FC against Mitra Kukar.

=== Perseru Serui ===
In 2017, he joined Perseru Serui for a Liga 1 match. Mariando made his debut on 20 April 2017 in a match against Bhayangkara. Mariando first scored in a match against Madura United. He made 32 league appearances and scored 5 goals for Perseru Serui.

=== Semen Padang ===
In September 2019, he rejoined Semen Padang for second half of 2019 Liga 1 (Indonesia). He made his league debut on 16 October 2019 in a match against Persija Jakarta. On 16 October 2019, Mariando scored his first goal for Semen Padang against Persija Jakarta in the 95th minute at the Patriot Candrabaga Stadium, Bekasi.

=== Arema ===
In 2020, Urobmabin signed a contract with Indonesian Liga 1 club Arema. The 2020 Liga 1 competition stopped only after three games due to the COVID-19 pandemic that led to restrictions against professional football matches for one full year.

=== Persiba Balikpapan ===
In 2021, Urobmabin signed a contract with Indonesian Liga 2 club Persiba Balikpapan. He made his league debut on 6 October 2021 against Kalteng Putra at the Tuah Pahoe Stadium, Palangka Raya.

== International career ==
Mariando was selected the best player of the year when Indonesia under-19 team became champions the HKFA Youth Invitation Tournament in Hong Kong in 2013.

== Career statistics ==
=== Club ===
As of match played 1 December 2021

Club	Season	League			Cup		Other		Total	
Club	Season	Division	Apps	Goals	Apps	Goals	Apps	Goals	Apps	Goals
Sriwijaya	2016	Indonesia Soccer Championship A	3	0	0	0	0	0	3	0
Perseru Serui	2017	Liga 1	32	5	0	0	0	0	32	5
Barito Putera	2018	Liga 1	0	0	0	0	0	0	0	0
Semen Padang	2019	Liga 1	13	2	0	0	0	0	13	2
Arema	2020	Liga 1	0	0	0	0	0	0	0	0
Persiba Balikpapan	2021	Liga 2	6	0	0	0	0	0	6	0
Career total			54	7	0	0	0	0	54	7

== Honours ==
=== International ===
Indonesia U-19

- HKFA International Youth Invitation: 2013
