= Bruno Smith =

Brazilian footballer (born 1992)

Personal information
- Full name: Bruno Smith Nogueira Camargo
- Date of birth: 13 July 1992 (age 34)
- Place of birth: Franca, Brazil
- Height: 1.73 m (5 ft 8 in)
- Position: Midfielder

Team information
- Current team: Águia Negra

Youth career
- Desportivo Brasil
- FC Twente

Senior career*
Years	Team	Apps	(Gls)
2010	América-RN	0	(0)
2012	Internacional	1	(0)
2013	Palmeiras B	4	(1)
2013	Paulista	0	(0)
2014	Ipatinga		
2015	Penapolense	2	(0)
2016	Paysandu	1	(0)
2016	Al Ansar	10	(3)
2017	Água Santa	15	(1)
2018	Nova Iguaçu	2	(1)
2019	Barretos	13	(0)
2020	Vila Nova	24	(0)
2020	Imperatriz	3	(0)
2020–2021	Arema	0	(0)
2021–	Águia Negra	8	(0)
- * Club domestic league appearances and goals

Bruno Smith Nogueira Camargo (born 13 July 1992) is a Brazilian footballer who plays as a midfielder for Águia Negra.

== Career ==
Smith started his career with Brazilian second division side América-RN. After that, Smith joined the youth academy of FC Twente in the Dutch top flight, where he said, "not a very good experience, I was sold at the age of 17 to Twente in the Netherlands, I wasn't prepared for that, I didn't have the family support I should have at that time, I suffered a lot, but nothing with the club, personally."

Before the 2016 season, he signed for Paysandu in the Brazilian third division, where he made 10 appearances and scored 1 goal. On 9 March 2016, Smith debuted for Paysandu during a 1–0 win over Águia de Marabá. On 28 April 2016, he scored his first goal for Paysandu during a 2–1 win over Independente-PA.

In 2020, he signed for Imperatriz in the Brazilian third division. After that, Smith signed for Indonesian team Arema.
