= Werry Darta Taifur =

Indonesian economist (born 1960)

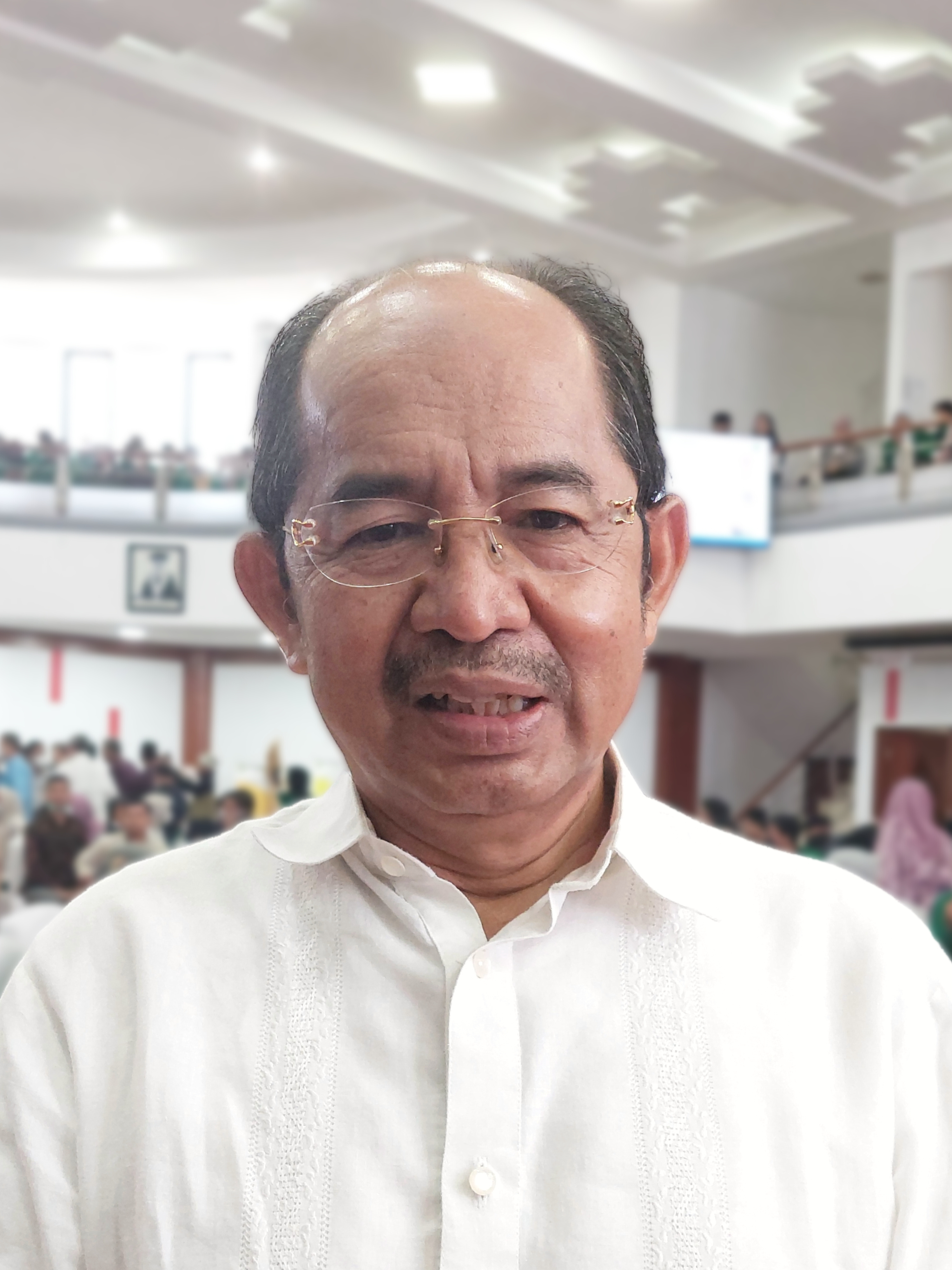

Rector of Andalas University
- In office 21 November 2011 – 21 November 2015
- Preceded by: Musliar Kasim
- Succeeded by: Tafdil Husni

Personal details
- Born: November 29, 1960 (age 65) Lima Puluh Kota Regency, West Sumatra, Indonesia

Werry Darta Taifur (born 29 November 1960 in Lima Puluh Kota, West Sumatra) is an Indonesian economist and professor who is currently serving as the Rector of Andalas University. He was sworn into office by Minister of Education Mohammad Nuh on 21 November 2011.

After graduating from the Faculty of Economics, Andalas University in Padang, Werry pursued his study at Flinders University, Adelaide, Australia. He continued his education at the University of Malaya, Kuala Lumpur where he obtained his masters and PhD degrees.

Preceded by Prof. Dr. Ir. H. Musliar Kasim, MS (2006–October 2011)	Rector of Andalas University; 21 November 2011–2015	Succeeded by –
