= Dave Mustaine (footballer) =

Indonesian footballer

Personal information
- Full name: Dave Mustaine
- Date of birth: 16 November 1992 (age 33)
- Place of birth: Sidoarjo, Indonesia
- Height: 1.82 m (6 ft 0 in)
- Position: Midfielder

Senior career*
Years	Team	Apps	(Gls)
2014–2015	Persekap Pasuruan	10	(1)
2016	PSS Sleman	18	(3)
2017	Gresik United	5	(0)
2017–2019	PSS Sleman	54	(4)
2020–2021	Arema	7	(0)
2022–2023	PSS Sleman	25	(4)
2023–2024	Malut United	13	(2)
2024	Adhyaksa	5	(1)
2024–2025	Bekasi City	5	(0)
2025–2026	Persiku Kudus	13	(0)
- * Club domestic league appearances and goals as of 27 February 2026

Dave Mustaine (born 16 November 1992) is an Indonesian professional footballer who plays as a midfielder.

== Career statistics ==
=== Club ===
As of match played 27 February 2026

Club	Season	League			Cup (Note: Includes Piala Indonesia)		Other		Total	
Club	Season	Division	Apps	Goals	Apps	Goals	Apps	Goals	Apps	Goals
Persekap Pasuruan	2014	Premier Division	10	1	0	0	0	0	10	1
Persekap Pasuruan	2015	Premier Division	0	0	0	0	0	0	0	0
Persekap Pasuruan	Total		10	1	0	0	0	0	10	1
PSS Sleman	2016	ISC B	18	3	0	0	0	0	18	3
Persegres Gresik	2017	Liga 1	5	0	0	0	0	0	5	0
PSS Sleman	2017	Liga 2	8	1	0	0	0	0	8	1
PSS Sleman	2018	Liga 2	21	3	0	0	0	0	21	3
PSS Sleman	2019	Liga 1	25	0	0	0	0	0	25	0
PSS Sleman	Total		54	4	0	0	0	0	54	4
Arema	2020	Liga 1	1	0	0	0	0	0	1	0
Arema	2021–22	Liga 1	6	0	0	0	2 (Note: Appearances in Menpora Cup)	0	8	0
Arema	Total		7	0	0	0	2	0	9	0
PSS Sleman	2021–22	Liga 1	16	3	0	0	0	0	16	3
PSS Sleman	2022–23	Liga 1	9	1	0	0	6 (Note: Appearances in Indonesia President's Cup)	0	15	1
PSS Sleman	2023–24	Liga 1	0	0	0	0	0	0	0	0
Maluku Utara United	2023–24	Liga 2	13	2	0	0	0	0	13	2
Adhyaksa	2024–25	Liga 2	5	1	0	0	0	0	5	1
Bekasi City	2024–25	Liga 2	5	0	0	0	0	0	5	0
Persiku Kudus	2025–26	Liga 2	13	0	0	0	0	0	13	0
Career total			155	15	0	0	8	0	163	15

== Honours ==
=== Club ===
PSS Sleman

- Liga 2: 2018

Malut United

- Liga 2 third place (play-offs): 2023–24
