= Gus tf Sakai =

Indonesian writer

- Born: 13 August 1965 (age 61); Payakumbuh, West Sumatra
- Occupation: Writer
- Writing career
- Pen name: Gus tf Sakai
- Language: Indonesian

Gus tf Sakai or Gustafrizal Busra, (born in Sumatera Barat, West Sumatera, 13 August 1965,), is an Indonesian writer. His name Gus tf Sakai is used when he writes proses, while Gus tf used when he writes poems. He settles in Payakumbuh, West Sumatra. He graduated from elementary, middle, and high schools in Payakumbuh. Then he went to the Faculty of Animal Science, Andalas University, Padang (completed 1994).

His creativity evolved from his early childhood, which starts from the drawing, writing poems and essays on the diary. His first publication was a short story that won a contest when he was in 6th grade, 1979. Then he often joined the competition and won. After publishing his works with a variety of pseudonyms until the end of high school in 1985, he decided to live by writing. Since then, he uses two names: Gus and Gus tf Sakai. In 1996, he returned to Payakumbuh. Together with his wife, Zurniati, he decided to live and settle in the village with their three children.

Some of his works have been translated into some languages. A collection of short stories, ‘Kemilau Cahaya dan Perempuan Buta’’, who won the Lontar Literary Award 2001 and translated into English and published by the Lontar Foundation under the title The Barber and Other Short Stories, which was translated by Justine FitzGerald, Anna Nettheim, and Linda Owens.

== Publications ==
- Gustafrizal Busra Istana Ketirisan (Short Stories). Jakarta: Balai Pustaka. 1996. OCLC 224090302.
- Gus tf Sakai Sangkar daging (collection of rhymes). Jakarta: Gramedia Widiasarana Indonesia. 1997. OCLC 38216558.
- Gus tf Sakai Kemilau Cahaya dan Perempuan Buta / The Barber and Other Short Stories (short stories). Jakarta: The Lontar Foundation. 2002. OCLC 51543947.
- Gus tf Sakai Tiga Cinta, Ibu (novel). Jakarta: Gramedia Pustaka Utama. 2002. OCLC 54464862.
- Gus tf Sakai Ular Keempat (novel). Jakarta: Penerbit Buku Kompas. 2005. OCLC 224772363.
- Gus tf Sakai Daging Akar (poems). Jakarta: Penerbit Buku Kompas. 2005. OCLC 62872696.
- Gus tf Sakai Perantau (short stories). Jakarta: Gramedia Pustaka Utama. 2007. OCLC 166889216.
- Gus tf Sakai Akar Berpilin (poems). Jakarta: Gramedia Pustaka Utama. 2009. OCLC 436945516.
- Gus tf Sakai Kaki yang Terhormat (short stories). Jakarta: Gramedia Pustaka Utama. 2012. OCLC 811850455.
