= Gitra Yuda Furton =

Indonesian footballer

Gitra Yuda
Personal information
- Full name: Gitra Yuda Furton
- Date of birth: 7 April 1993 (age 33)
- Place of birth: Padang, Indonesia
- Height: 1.75 m (5 ft 9 in)
- Position: Defender

Youth career
- 2011–2012: PS Bengkulu
- 2013–2014: Semen Padang

Senior career*
Years	Team	Apps	(Gls)
2015	Semen Padang	0	(0)
2016	PS TNI	0	(0)
2017–2018	Persik Kediri	7	(0)
2019	Persibat Batang	8	(0)
2019	Martapura	9	(0)
2020	Arema	0	(0)
2021	PSM Makassar	0	(0)
2021	Badak Lampung	3	(0)
2022–2023	PSKC Cimahi	3	(0)
- * Club domestic league appearances and goals as of 1 October 2022

Gitra Yuda Furton (born 7 April 1993) is an Indonesian professional footballer who plays as a defender.

== Career ==
=== Semen Padang ===
Gitra Yuda is a Semen Padang U-21 player and moreover, he managed to bring Semen Padang U-21 won in the Indonesia Super League U-21 for the first time in this year after defeating Sriwijaya FC U-21.

In 2015, he joined the senior squad of Semen Padang F.C. in 2015 Indonesia Super League, wearing jersey number 5.

=== PS TNI ===
Gitra joined PS TNI for the 2016 Indonesia Soccer Championship A.

== Honours ==
=== Club ===
Semen Padang U-21

- Indonesia Super League U-21: 2014
