= Hasnul Suhaimi =

Indonesian businessman

Hasnul Suhaimi (born in Bukittinggi, West Sumatra, 23 April 1957) is a telecommunications practitioner from Indonesia. He is the former CEO of PT Excelcomindo Pratama Tbk, also known as XL (2006–2015). Previously, he had worked at Schlumberger (1981–1982) and PT Indosat (1983–2006).

== Career ==
Suhaimi graduated from Institut Teknologi Bandung (ITB) in 1981 with a degree in electrical engineering. Following graduation, Suhaimi took a position working with Schlumberger.

At that time, telecommunications in Indonesia was underdeveloped. Suhaimi saw potential there and began working for PT Indosat in 1983. While still working for Indosat, he secured positions on the Board of Directors of both IM3 and Telkomsel. Suhaimi began his career at PT Indosat as a staff planner. While working there, he had the opportunity to study at the University of Hawaii at Manoa. In 1992, he completed his MBA. He continued to climb in the ranks at Indosat until he was promoted to the top position of President Director in 2005.

In September 2006, Suhaimi left Indosat and was officially appointed as the President Director of PT Excelcomindo Pratama Tbk. He retired in April 2015. Since July 2015, he has worked as a business adviser at Telekom Malaysia International.
