= 2021–22 in Indonesian football =

Football in Indonesia
- Season: 2021

The 2021 season of competitive association football in Indonesia.

== Promotion and relegation ==
League	Promoted to league	Relegated from league
Liga 1	Persik; Persita; Persiraja	Badak Lampung; Semen Padang; Kalteng Putra
Liga 2	Persijap; PSKC; Tiga Naga; Persekat; Putra Safin Group (formerly Putra Sinar Giri); Hizbul Wathan (formerly Semeru)	PSGC; Persibat; Bandung United; Madura; Persatu; PSMP

=== Name changes ===
- Semeru relocated to Sidoarjo and were renamed to Hizbul Wathan.
- Putra Sinar Giri relocated to Pati and were renamed to Putra Safin Group Pati (PSG Pati). However, in June 2021, the club was acquired by Atta Halilintar and renamed themselves again into AHHA PS Pati, although the name change won't come into effect until next season.

== Domestic leagues ==
=== Liga 1 ===
Liga 1
- Season: 2021–22
- Dates: 27 August 2021 – 31 March 2022
- Champions: Bali United; 2nd Liga 1 title 2nd Indonesian title
- Relegated: Persipura; Persela; Persiraja
- AFC Cup: Bali United; PSM
- 2023–24 AFC Champions League: Bali United
- 2023–24 AFC Cup: Persib
- Matches: 305
- Goals: 708 (2.32 per match)
- Top goalscorer: Ilija Spasojević (23 goals)
- Biggest home win: Bali United 5–0 Persiraja (30 November 2021); Persikabo 1973 5–0 Persiraja (9 December 2021)
- Biggest away win: Persiraja 0–5 Persikabo 1973 (19 March 2022)
- Highest scoring: Persik 4–2 Persipura (21 October 2021); Persib 4–2 PSS (22 October 2021); Persikabo 1973 4–2 Persela (27 November 2021); Persebaya 3–3 Persija (14 February 2022); Madura United 3–3 Barito Putera (9 March 2022); PSIS 3–3 Persita (20 March 2022)
- Longest winning run: 9 matches Bali United
- Longest unbeaten run: 23 matches Arema
- Longest winless run: 25 matches Persela
- Longest losing run: 6 matches Persipura

The 2021–22 Liga 1, also known as BRI Liga 1 for sponsorship reasons, was the fifth season of Liga 1 under its current name and the 12th season of the top-flight Indonesian professional league for association football clubs since its establishment in 2008. The season started on 27 August 2021. Bali United were the defending champions from the 2019 season after the 2020 season was abandoned and declared void after three matches due to the COVID-19 pandemic.

On 25 March 2022, Bali United succeeded in defending their title for the second consecutive season, after second placed Persib draw to Persik, giving Bali United a 4-point lead with only one games left.

== Effects of the COVID-19 pandemic ==
=== Cancellation of the 2020 season ===
PSSI canceled the 2020 Liga 1 season after putting it under suspension twice due to the COVID-19 pandemic. The first suspension was announced after finishing matchday three on 15 March 2020, two weeks after the government announced the first cases of COVID-19 in Indonesia. The initial suspension was only for two weeks but it was extended to 29 May 2020. However, the government blocked every attempt to resume the competition. On 27 June 2020, PSSI issued a decree to continue Liga 1 from October 2020.

After failing to obtain government and police permissions for the umpteenth time, PSSI on 29 September 2020 announced the second postponement of the 2020 season of Liga 1 and Liga 2. This time the initial suspension had a one-month period. After the end date was reached, PSSI on 29 October 2020 declared the 2020 football seasons could not be held in 2020. There was an attempt to resume the 2020 season in 2021. However, on 15 January 2021, PSSI decided to cancel the 2020 season of all football competitions and declared them void.

=== 2021 season plans ===
PSSI and PT LIB plan to hold the 2021 season in coordination with the Indonesian Police and other state agencies despite the ongoing COVID-19 pandemic in Indonesia, the country with the most COVID-19 cases in Southeast Asia. The original plan was to hold it from 11 June 2021 and finish on 11 March 2022. After months of debate, PSSI decided against eliminating the relegation and promotion system, an option that many cash-strapped clubs proposed. PSSI also changed the starting date to early July 2021. COVID-19 restrictions in many cities on Java island delayed the commencement to late August 2021.

In order to obtain government permission, PSSI and PT LIB themselves had to incorporate various COVID-19 restrictions for the 2021 season, including disallowing fans to be inside or outside the stadium before, during, and after matches. Only a maximum of 299 people, including players, coaches, team officials, security personnel, and special guests, are allowed to enter the stadium. In addition, all entrants are required to be tested, pass temperature checks, wear masks, and follow other health protocols. All players also must be fully vaccinated to be eligible to play. All matches are expected to be played on main island of Java to reduce contagion risks from air travel, leading to protests from non-Java teams that must relocate their base to a Java city.

As a simulation for the 2021 season, PSSI held the 2021 Menpora Cup as a pre-season tournament for the Liga 1 teams. The event was held as a reference in implementing health protocols so that government and police officials become convinced that professional football matches would not turn into super-spreader events.

=== 2021 format ===
Cognizant of the fluctuating situation caused by the COVID-19 pandemic, PSSI and PT LIB decided the league format will be divided into six series that consider the infection levels across Java island. Each series will cover 45-54 matches (five to six matchdays) played in multiple designated regions to ensure no club will play in their home grounds. The venues can change days ahead of schedule if certain regions are deemed as COVID-19 red zones or violations to COVID-19 rules occurred at a specific stadium.

The first series (six matchdays) will be held in the provinces of Banten, West Java, and DKI Jakarta with six stadiums (Benteng Taruna Stadium, Pakansari Stadium, Patriot Stadium (Indonesia), Wibawa Mukti Stadium, Gelora Bandung Lautan Api Stadium and Jalak Harupat Stadium). The second series is planned to be held in the provinces Central Java and Special Region of Yogyakarta with five stadiums (Jatidiri Stadium, Citarum Stadium, Manahan Stadium, Maguwoharjo Stadium and Sultan Agung Stadium). The third series is planned to entirely run in East Java province but in different nine stadiums (Gelora Bung Tomo Stadium, Gelora 10 November Stadium, Kanjuruhan Stadium, Gajayana Stadium, Surajaya Stadium, Petrokimia Stadium, Gelora Delta Stadium, Brawijaya Stadium, Gelora Bangkalan Stadium).

The fourth and fifth series will be held in Bali with limited supporters in four stadiums (Kapten I Wayan Dipta Stadium (Gianyar), Ngurah Rai Stadium (Denpasar), Kompyang Sujana Stadium (Denpasar), and Samudra Stadium (Badung)), before the sixth and last series is planned to take place at venues in the kick-off series in the provinces of Banten, West Java, and DKI Jakarta.

== Teams ==
Eighteen teams are competing in the league – all teams retained from the scrapped 2021–22 season.

=== Name changes ===
- In early 2020, TIRA-Persikabo changed its name to Persikabo 1973.
- In late 2020, Bhayangkara relocated to Surakarta from Jakarta and changed its name to Bhayangkara Solo. However, the changes were annulled, according to PSSI in its 2021 annual congress.

=== Stadiums and locations ===
Original locations of the 2020–21 Liga 1 teams

Team	Location	Stadium	Capacity
Arema	Malang	Kanjuruhan	42,449
Bali United	Gianyar	Kapten I Wayan Dipta	23,081
Bali United	Bantul	Sultan Agung (Note: Stadium planned to be used for home games of non-Java teams for matches behind closed doors.)	35,000
Barito Putera	Martapura	Demang Lehman (Note: Barito Putera played their home matches at Demang Lehman due to the renovation of their stadium at May 17th.)	15,000
Barito Putera	Sleman	Maguwoharjo	31,700
Bhayangkara	Surakarta	Manahan	20,000
Borneo	Samarinda	Segiri	16,000
Borneo	Sleman	Maguwoharjo	31,700
Madura United	Pamekasan	Gelora Madura	15,000
Persebaya	Surabaya	Gelora Bung Tomo	55,000
Persela	Lamongan	Surajaya	16,000
Persib	Bandung	Si Jalak Harupat	27,000
Persib	Bandung	Gelora Bandung Lautan Api	38,000
Persija	Jakarta	Gelora Bung Karno (Note: Persija also registered Patriot Candrabhaga as their home stadium.)	77,193
Persija	Bantul	Sultan Agung	35,000
Persik	Kediri	Brawijaya	20,000
Persipura	Manado	Klabat (Note: Persipura played their home matches at Klabat due to the renovation of their stadium at Mandala for 2020 Indonesian National Games (PON XX).)	10,000
Persipura	Lamongan	Surajaya	16,000
Persiraja	Banda Aceh	Harapan Bangsa	45,000
Persiraja	Sleman	Maguwoharjo	31,700
Persita	Tangerang	Indomilk Arena	30,000
PSIS	Semarang	Citarum (Note: PSIS will play their home matches at Citarum because the rebuilding of their stadium at Jatidiri isn't finished yet. They also registered Moch. Soebroto and Kebondalem.)	7,000
PSM	Makassar	Andi Mattalata	15,000
PSM	Bantul	Sultan Agung	35,000
PSS	Sleman	Maguwoharjo	31,700
TIRA-Persikabo	Cibinong	Pakansari	30,000

=== Personnel and kits ===
Note: Flags indicate national team as has been defined under FIFA eligibility rules. Players and coaches may hold more than one non-FIFA nationality.

Team	Head coach	Captain	Kit manufacturer	Shirt Sponsor(s)
Arema	(Brazil) Carlos Oliveira	(Indonesia) Hendro Siswanto	Made by club	Ms Glow for Men^{1}, Krating Daeng^{1}, Indomie^{1}, Joseph Refo Investment Inc^{1}
Bali United	(Brazil) Stefano Cugurra	(Indonesia) Fadil Sausu	Made by club	OVO^{1}, Envi^{1}, Indofood^{1}, Smartfren^{1}, Wuling Motors^{1}, Bank Ina^{1}, KukuBima Ener-G!^{1}, Alderon^{1}, Coco Mart^{1}, Bengkel BOS^{1}, CBN Fiber^{2}, Indomie^{2}, Achilles^{2}, Ms Glow for Men^{3}, Buana Capital^{3}, YCAB Foundation^{3}, TOA^{4}
Barito Putera	(Indonesia) Djadjang Nurdjaman	(Indonesia) Rizky Pora	Made by club	Hasnur Group^{1}
Bhayangkara	(Northern Ireland) Paul Munster	(Indonesia) Indra Kahfi	SPECS	BNI^{1}, Jatim Park Group^{1}, Gojek^{1}, Go-Pay^{1}, Bright Gas^{2}, Jasa Raharja^{3}
Borneo	(Argentina) Mario Gómez	(Indonesia) Diego Michiels	RIORS	Feast^{1}, BIB^{1}, KukuBima Ener-G!^{1}, Ansaf^{1}, Fun88 Bola^{1}, Bank Kaltimtara^{2}
Madura United	(Indonesia) Rahmad Darmawan	(Indonesia) Slamet Nurcahyono	XTEN (Note: Madura United used MBB as their kit manufacturer before changed it from week 4.)	Pojur^{1}, Lion Group^{1}, KukuBima Ener-G!^{1}, Integra Group^{1}, Kangean Energy Indonesia^{1}, Kopi ABC^{2}, Tiket.com^{3}
Persebaya	(Indonesia) Aji Santoso	(Indonesia) Hansamu Yama	Made by club	Extra Joss^{1}, Kapal Api^{1}, Muhammadiyah University of Surabaya^{2}, MPM Distributor Honda^{3}
Persela	(Indonesia) Nil Maizar	(Indonesia) Eky Taufik	Made by club	So Nice^{1}, Extra Joss^{2}
Persib	(Netherlands) Robert Alberts	(Indonesia) Supardi Nasir	Sportama	Pria Punya Selera^{1}, Halodoc^{1}, Indofood^{1}, Mobil^{1}, Permata Bank Syariah^{1}, Kopi ABC^{2}, Azzuri^{2}, Envi^{3}, Didimax^{3}, Indomie^{3}
Persija	(Indonesia) Sudirman	(Indonesia) Andritany Ardhiyasa	Juara	Krating Daeng^{1}, Amman Mineral^{1}, Indomie^{1}, Bank DKI^{1}, Ithaca Resources^{3}
Persik	(Indonesia) Budi Sudarsono	(Indonesia) Faris Aditama	Noij (Note: Persik used MBB as their kit manufacturer before changed it from week 4.)	Biznet^{1}^{2}, Greenland Kediri^{2}
Persipura	(Brazil) Jacksen F. Tiago	(Indonesia) Boaz Solossa	SPECS	KukuBima Ener-G!^{1}, Bank Papua^{1}, PT Freeport Indonesia^{1}
Persiraja	(Indonesia) Hendri Susilo	(Indonesia) Mukhlis Nakata	Adhoc (Note: Persiraja used MBB as their kit manufacturer before changed it from week 4.)	Dek Gam Foundation^{1}, Bank Aceh^{1}, Lion Parcel^{1}, Kyriad Hotel Muraya Aceh^{1}, Extra Joss^{2}, PDAM Tirta Daroy^{2}, The Atjeh Connection^{3}
Persita	(Indonesia) Widodo C. Putro	(Indonesia) Egi Melgiansyah	Made by club	Palang Merah Indonesia^{1}, Matrix^{1}, Indomilk^{1}, Moya^{1}, Krating Daeng^{2}, Indomie^{2}, SOS Children's Villages^{2}, Aetra^{3}
PSIS	(Montenegro) Dragan Đukanović	(Brazil) Wallace Costa	RIORS	DBAsia.news^{1}, Indomie^{1}, Charlie Hospital^{1}, Extra Joss^{2}, Pegadaian^{3}
PSM	Vacant	(Netherlands) Wiljan Pluim	Umbro	Semen Bosowa^{1}, Kalla Group^{1}, Honda^{2}, KukuBima Ener-G!^{3}
PSS	(Serbia) Dejan Antonić	(Indonesia) Bagus Nirwanto	Sembada	Krating Daeng^{1}, Indomie^{1}, ACEOFNEWS^{1}
TIRA-Persikabo	(Belarus) Igor Kriushenko	(Indonesia) Manahati Lestusen	DJ Sport	SBOTOP^{1}

Notes:

1. On the front of shirt.
2. On the back of shirt.
3. On the sleeves.
4. On the shorts.

Additionally, SPECS made referee kits and also supplied the match ball, the Illuzion II.

Apparel changes:

=== Coaching changes ===
Team	Outgoing coach	Manner of departure	Date of vacancy	Week	Table	Incoming coach	Date of appointment
Persik	(Indonesia) Budiardjo Thalib	End of contract	15 December 2019	Pre-season		(Indonesia) Joko Susilo	4 January 2020
PSM	(Bosnia and Herzegovina) Darije Kalezić	Resigned	23 December 2019	Pre-season		(Croatia) Bojan Hodak	31 December 2019
Arema	(Bosnia and Herzegovina) Milomir Šešlija	End of contract	23 December 2019	Pre-season		(Argentina) Mario Gómez	2 January 2020
Madura United	(Indonesia) Rasiman	Demoted to assistant coach	23 December 2019	Pre-season		(Indonesia) Rahmad Darmawan	23 December 2019
Borneo	(Argentina) Mario Gómez	End of contract	26 December 2019	Pre-season		(Brazil) Edson Tavares	4 January 2020
PSIS	(Indonesia) Bambang Nurdiansyah	Resigned	1 January 2020	Pre-season		(Montenegro) Dragan Đukanović	1 January 2020
Persija	(Brazil) Edson Tavares	End of contract	2 January 2020	Pre-season		(Brazil) Sérgio Farias	12 January 2020
PSS	(Indonesia) Seto Nurdiantoro	End of contract	12 January 2020	Pre-season		(Spain) Eduardo Pérez	15 January 2020
PSS	(Spain) Eduardo Pérez	Resigned	24 February 2020	Pre-season		(Serbia) Dejan Antonić	26 February 2020
Arema	(Argentina) Mario Gómez	Resigned	3 August 2020	4	12	(Brazil) Carlos Oliveira	17 September 2020
Borneo	(Brazil) Edson Tavares	Sacked	11 August 2020	4	3	(Argentina) Mario Gómez	21 August 2020
Persik	(Indonesia) Joko Susilo	Became technical director	13 August 2020	4	13	(Indonesia) Budi Sudarsono	13 August 2020
Persija	(Brazil) Sérgio Farias	Mutual consent	10 September 2020	4	9	(Indonesia) Sudirman	10 September 2020
PSM	(Croatia) Bojan Hodak	Signed by Kuala Lumpur United	9 January 2021	4	6		

=== Foreign players ===
Football Association of Indonesia restricted the number of foreign players to four per team, including one slot for a player from AFC countries. Teams can use all the foreign players at once.

- Players name in **bold** indicates the player was registered during the mid-season transfer window.
- Former Player(s) were players that out of squad or left club within the season, after pre-season transfer window, or in the mid-season transfer window, and at least had one appearance.

Team	Player 1	Player 2	Player 3	Asian Player	Former Player(s)
Arema	(Brazil) **Bruno Smith**	(Brazil) **Caio Ruan**			(Argentina) Jonatan Bauman (South Korea) Oh In-kyun (Argentina) Elías Alderete (Uruguay) Matías Malvino
Bali United	(Brazil) Willian Pacheco	(Iraq) Brwa Nouri	(Netherlands) Melvin Platje		(Portugal) Paulo Sérgio
Barito Putera	(Brazil) Cássio	(Serbia) Aleksandar Rakić	(Serbia) Danilo Sekulić		(Palestine) Yashir Islame
Bhayangkara	(Brazil) Renan Silva	(Chad) Ezechiel N'Douassel	(South Korea) Lee Won-jae		(Ivory Coast) Hervé Guy
Borneo	(Tajikistan) Nuriddin Davronov	(Uzbekistan) Javlon Guseynov			(Brazil) Torres (Brazil) Diogo Campos
Madura United	(Australia) Jacob Pepper	(Brazil) Bruno Matos	(Brazil) Jaimerson		(Ghana) Emmanuel Oti Essigba
Persebaya	(Australia) Aryn Williams				(Brazil) David da Silva (Mali) Makan Konaté (Palestine) Mahmoud Eid
Persela	(Brazil) Gabriel do Carmo	(Brazil) Marquinhos Carioca	(Iraq) Brian Ferreira		(Japan) Shunsuke Nakamura (North Macedonia) Jasmin Mecinović (Brazil) Rafinha
Persib	(Brazil) Wander Luiz	(Netherlands) Geoffrey Castillion	(Netherlands) Nick Kuipers	(Philippines) Omid Nazari	
Persija	(Brazil) **Yann Motta**	(Croatia) Marko Šimić	(Italy) Marco Motta	(Nepal) Rohit Chand	(Netherlands) Marc Klok (Note: Gained Indonesian citizenship)
Persik					(Serbia) Nikola Ašćerić (Australia) Ante Bakmaz (Argentina) Gaspar Vega (Brazil) Jefferson Oliveira
Persipura	(Japan) Takuya Matsunaga				(Netherlands) Sylvano Comvalius (Brazil) Arthur Cunha (Brazil) Thiago Amaral
Persiraja					(England) Adam Mitter (Brazil) Vanderlei (Brazil) Bruno Dybal (Lebanon) Samir Ayass
Persita	(Kyrgyzstan) Tamirlan Kozubaev	(Ukraine) Yevhen Budnik			(Argentina) Mateo Bustos (Bosnia and Herzegovina) Eldar Hasanović
PSIS	(Brazil) Bruno Silva	(Brazil) Flávio Beck	(Brazil) Wallace Costa	(Palestine) Jonathan Cantillana	
PSM	(Netherlands) Wiljan Pluim				(Lebanon) Hussein Eldor (Brazil) Giancarlo (Bosnia and Herzegovina) Šerif Hasić
PSS	(Brazil) Guilherme Batata	(Liberia) Zah Rahan Krangar	(Ukraine) Yevhen Bokhashvili	(Australia) Aaron Evans	
TIRA-Persikabo	(Brazil) Alex Gonçalves	(Brazil) Ciro Alves			(Finland) Petteri Pennanen (Uzbekistan) Artyom Filiposyan

Source: First transfer window

== League table ==
Pos	Team	Pld	W	D	L	GF	GA	GD	Pts	Qualification or relegation
1	Persib	3	3	0	0	7	2	+5	9	
2	Bali United	3	2	1	0	5	2	+3	7	Qualification for the 2021 AFC Cup group stage (Note: Bali United qualified for the 2021 AFC Cup group stage as the 2019 Liga 1 champions.)
3	Borneo	3	2	0	1	6	4	+2	6	
4	Persipura	3	2	0	1	6	5	+1	6	Qualification for the 2021 AFC Cup play-off round (Note: Persipura qualified for the 2021 AFC Cup play-off round as the 2019 Liga 1 third place.)
5	PSIS	3	2	0	1	5	4	+1	6	
6	PSM	3	1	2	0	4	3	+1	5	
7	Persiraja	3	1	2	0	1	0	+1	5	
8	Madura United	3	1	1	1	5	3	+2	4	
9	Persija	2	1	1	0	5	4	+1	4	
10	TIRA-Persikabo	3	1	1	1	3	3	0	4	
11	Bhayangkara	3	0	3	0	3	3	0	3	
12	Arema	3	1	0	2	3	4	−1	3	
13	Persik	3	0	2	1	2	3	−1	2	
14	Persita	3	0	2	1	2	4	−2	2	
15	Persebaya	2	0	1	1	4	5	−1	1	
16	PSS	3	0	1	2	2	4	−2	1	
17	Barito Putera	3	0	1	2	2	7	−5	1	
18	Persela	3	0	0	3	3	8	−5	0	

Source: Shopee Liga 1 2020, Soccerway
Rules for classification: 1) Points; 2) Head-to-head; 3) Goal difference; 4) Goal scored; 5) Drawing.

== Results ==
Home \ Away	ARE	BLU	BPT	BHA	BOR	MDU	PBY	PSL	PSB	PSJ	KDR	PPR	RAJ	PTA	SMG	PSM	PSS	TIR
Arema	—						a		1–2									
Bali United		—				3–1								0–0				
Barito Putera		1–2	—															
Bhayangkara				—						2–2								
Borneo					—			2–1				2–0						
Madura United			4–0			—							0–0					
Persebaya	a						—				1–1	3–4						
Persela								—							2–3			
Persib								3–0	—	a							2–1	
Persija					3–2				a	—								
Persik				1–1							—		0–1					
Persipura												—			2–0			
Persiraja				0–0									—					
Persita														—		1–1		
PSIS	2–0														—			
PSM			1–1													—	2–1	
PSS																	—	0–0
TIRA-Persikabo	0–2													3–1				—

Source: Shopee Liga 1 2020, Soccerway
Legend: Blue = home team win; Yellow = draw; Red = away team win.
For upcoming matches, an "a" indicates there is an article about the rivalry between the two participants.

== Season statistics ==
=== Top goalscorers ===
Rank	Player	Team	Goals
1	(Brazil) Wander Luiz	Persib	4
2	(Indonesia) Alberto Gonçalves	Madura United	3
3	(Indonesia) Kushedya Hari Yudo	Arema	2
3	(Netherlands) Melvin Platje	Bali United	2
3	(Brazil) Renan Silva	Bhayangkara	2
3	(Brazil) Torres	Borneo	2
3	(Brazil) Rafinha	Persela	2
3	(Netherlands) Geoffrey Castillion	Persib	2
3	(Indonesia) Evan Dimas	Persija	2
3	(Brazil) Thiago Amaral	Persipura	2
3	(Brazil) Bruno Silva	PSIS	2

=== Discipline ===
- Most yellow card(s): 2
  - 17 players
- Most red card(s): 1
  - (Argentina) Jonatan Bauman (Arema)
  - (Brazil) Gabriel do Carmo (Persela)
  - (Australia) Ante Bakmaz (Persik)
  - (Indonesia) Andri Ibo (Persik)
  - (Brazil) Arthur Cunha (Persipura)
  - (Indonesia) Feri Komul (Persiraja)
  - (Indonesia) Finky Pasamba (PSIS)
  - (Indonesia) Safrudin Tahar (PSIS)
  - (Indonesia) Derry Rachman (PSS)

== Attendances ==
Pos	Team	Total	High	Low	Average	Change
1	Persija	50,826	50,826	50,826	50,826	+109.1%
2	Persebaya	62,227	50,000	12,227	31,114	+88.9%
3	Persiraja	26,510	26,510	26,510	26,510	+277.1%^{†}
4	Persib	51,927	26,677	25,250	25,964	+72.3%
5	Arema	23,781	23,781	23,781	23,781	+67.7%
6	PSIS	16,272	16,272	16,272	16,272	+80.6%
7	Persik	23,642	12,600	11,042	11,821	+50.4%^{†}
8	Persita	10,019	10,019	10,019	10,019	+80.5%^{†}
9	PSM	19,855	12,317	7,538	9,928	+29.5%
10	Persela	8,956	8,956	8,956	8,956	+13.4%
11	TIRA-Persikabo	16,870	9,962	6,908	8,435	+47.0%
12	Bali United	14,774	8,223	6,551	7,387	−56.4%
13	Borneo	9,522	5,351	4,171	4,761	+50.1%
14	Barito Putera	4,481	4,481	4,481	4,481	−6.4%
15	Persipura	3,428	3,428	3,428	3,428	−2.7%
16	PSS	3,118	3,118	3,118	3,118	−83.5%
17	Madura United	6,136	3,865	2,271	3,068	−8.6%
18	Bhayangkara	0	0	0	0	−100.0%
	League total	352,344	50,826	0	13,552	+44.8%

Source: Shopee Liga 1 2020
Notes:
^{†} Teams played previous season in Liga 2

== National teams ==
=== Men's national football team ===
25 May 2021 Int'l Friendly	Indonesia	2–3	Afghanistan	Dubai, United Arab Emirates
20:00 UTC+4	Egy 59'; Alis 64'	Report	Amiri 7'; Sharifi 44'; Zamani 52'	Stadium: Jebel Ali Centre of Excellence; Attendance: 0

29 May 2021 Int'l Friendly	Indonesia	1–3	Oman	Dubai, United Arab Emirates
19:00 UTC+4	Evan 51'	Report	Al-Ghassani 40'; Al-Hajri 77', 88'	Stadium: The Sevens Stadium; Attendance: 0

16 November 2021 Int'l Friendly	Afghanistan	1–0	Indonesia	Antalya, Turkey
17:00 UTC+3	Popalzay 85'	Report		Stadium: Gloria Sports Arena

25 November 2021 Int'l Friendly	Indonesia	4–1	Myanmar	Antalya, Turkey
17:30 UTC+3	Kambuaya 5'; Irfan 12'; Witan 33'; Ezra 55' (pen.)	Report	H. Bo Bo 73'	Stadium: Emirhan Sports Complex

28 November 2021 Friendly	Indonesia	4–0	(Turkey) Antalyaspor	Antalya, Turkey
16:00 UTC+3	Kambuaya 54'; Witan 58'; Ezra 81'; Evan 90'	Report		Stadium: Limak Football Complex; Attendance: 0

==== 2022 FIFA World Cup qualification ====
3 June 2021 Group G	Thailand	2–2	Indonesia	Dubai, United Arab Emirates
20:45 UTC+4	Narubadin 5'; Adisak 50'	Report (FIFA); Report (AFC)	Agung 39'; Evan 60'	Stadium: Al Maktoum Stadium; Attendance: 0 Referee: Ammar Mahfoodh (Bahrain)

7 June 2021 Group G	Vietnam	4–0	Indonesia	Dubai, United Arab Emirates
20:45 UTC+4	Nguyễn Tiến Linh 51'; Nguyễn Quang Hải 62'; Nguyễn Công Phượng 67'; Vũ Văn Thanh 74'	Report (FIFA); Report (AFC)		Stadium: Al Maktoum Stadium; Attendance: 225; Referee: Ahmed Al-Ali (Jordan)

11 June 2021 Group G	Indonesia	0–5	United Arab Emirates	Dubai, United Arab Emirates
20:45 UTC+4		Report (FIFA); Report (AFC)	Mabkhout 22', 49'; Lima 28', 55'; Tagliabúe 86'	Stadium: Zabeel Stadium; Attendance: 963; Referee: Mohammed Al-Hoish (Saudi Arabia)

==== 2023 AFC Asian Cup qualification – play-off round ====
7 October 2021 Play-off Round	Indonesia	2–1	Chinese Taipei	Buriram, Thailand
19:00 UTC+7	Rumakiek 16'; Evan 48'	Report	Hsu Heng-pin 90'	Stadium: Buriram Stadium; Attendance: 0 Referee: Payam Heidari (Iran)

11 October 2021 Play-off Round	Chinese Taipei	0–3	Indonesia	Buriram, Thailand
20:00 UTC+7		Report	Egy 27'; Kambuaya 55'; Witan 90+3'	Stadium: Buriram Stadium; Attendance: 0 Referee: Mohammad Arafah (Jordan)

==== 2020 AFF Championship ====
9 December 2021 Group B	Indonesia	4–2	Cambodia	Bishan, Singapore
20:30 UTC+8	Rachmat 5', 33'; Evan 17'; Rumakiek 54'	Report (AFFSZ); Report (AFF)	Safy 37'; Mony Udom 60'	Stadium: Bishan Stadium; Referee: Yaqoob Abdul Baki (Oman)

12 December 2021 Group B	Laos	1–5	Indonesia	Bishan, Singapore
17:30 UTC+8	Souvanny 41'	Report (AFFSZ); Report (AFF)	Asnawi 23' (pen.); Irfan 34'; Witan 56'; Ezra 77'; Evan 84'	Stadium: Bishan Stadium; Attendance: 207; Referee: Kim Hee-gon (South Korea)

15 December 2021 Group B	Indonesia	0–0	Vietnam	Bishan, Singapore
20:30 UTC+8		Report (AFFSZ); Report (AFF)		Stadium: Bishan Stadium; Attendance: 928; Referee: Kim Dae-yong (South Korea)

19 December 2021 Group B	Malaysia	1–4	Indonesia	Kallang, Singapore
20:30 UTC+8	Kogileswaran 13'	Report (AFFSZ); Report (AFF)	Irfan 36', 43'; Arhan 50'; Baggott 82'	Stadium: National Stadium; Attendance: 7,082; Referee: Ammar Ebrahim Mahfoodh (Bahrain)

22 December 2021 Semi-finals	Singapore	1–1	Indonesia	Kallang, Singapore
20:30 UTC+8	Ikhsan 70'	Report (AFFSZ); Report (AFF)	Witan 28'	Stadium: National Stadium; Attendance: 9,952; Referee: Kim Hee-gon (South Korea)

25 December 2021 Semi-finals	Indonesia	4–2 (a.e.t.)	Singapore	Kallang, Singapore
20:30 UTC+8	Ezra 11'; Arhan 87'; Shawal 91' (o.g.); Egy 105+2'	Report (AFFSZ); Report (AFF)	Song 45+4'; Shahdan 74'	Stadium: National Stadium; Attendance: 9,982; Referee: Qasim Al-Hatmi (Oman)

29 December 2021 Finals	Indonesia	0–4	Thailand	Kallang, Singapore
20:30 UTC+8		Report (AFFSZ); Report (AFF)	Chanathip 2', 52'; Supachok 67'; Bordin 83'	Stadium: National Stadium; Attendance: 6,290; Referee: Shukri Al-Alhunfush (Saudi Arabia)

=== Men's under-23 football team ===
5 March 2021 Friendly	Indonesia	2–0	(Indonesia) TIRA-Persikabo	Jakarta, Indonesia
20:00 UTC+7	Kadek 45'; Rafli 48'	Report	Lerby 83'	Stadium: Madya Stadium; Attendance: 0 Referee: Moch. Adung (Indonesia)

7 March 2021 Friendly	Indonesia	3–1	(Indonesia) Bali United	Jakarta, Indonesia
19:30 UTC+7	Kushedya 35'; Koko Ari 69'; Osvaldo 75'	Report	Lerby 83'	Stadium: Madya Stadium; Attendance: 0 Referee: Mustofa Umarella (Indonesia)

19 October 2021 Int'l Friendly	Indonesia	2–1	Tajikistan	Dushanbe, Tajikistan
18:00 UTC+5	Hanis 35'; Bagus 63'	Report	Shervoni 5'	Stadium: Republican Central Stadium; Attendance: 0

22 October 2021 Int'l Friendly	Indonesia	2–0	Nepal	Hisor, Tajikistan
17:00 UTC+5	Hanis 55'; Witan 90+3'	Report		Stadium: Hisor Central Stadium; Attendance: 0

==== 2022 AFC U-23 Asian Cup qualification ====
26 October 2021 Group G	Indonesia	2–3	Australia	Dushanbe, Tajikistan
17:00 UTC+5	Witan 68'; Taufik 84'	Report	Tokich 53'; Wood 59'; Italiano 77'	Stadium: Republican Central Stadium; Attendance: 0 Referee: Kim Woo-sung (South Korea)

29 October 2021 Group G	Australia	1–0	Indonesia	Dushanbe, Tajikistan
17:00 UTC+5	Wood 10'	Report		Stadium: Republican Central Stadium; Attendance: 0 Referee: Sivakorn Pu-udom (Thailand)

=== Men's under-19 football team ===
21 November 2021 Friendly	Indonesia	3–1	(Turkey) Antalyaspor U18s	Antalya, Turkey
15:00 UTC+3	Kwateh 33', 81'; Nico 40' (pen.)	Report	Demir 45'	Stadium: Limak Football Complex; Attendance: 0

24 November 2021 Friendly	Indonesia	4–0	(Turkey) Alanyaspor U18s	Antalya, Turkey
16:00 UTC+3	Kwateh 1', 18'; Ricky 5'; Own goal 11'	Report		Stadium: Limak Football Complex; Attendance: 0

27 November 2021 Friendly	Indonesia	2–1	(The Gambia) MMK	Antalya, Turkey
10:30 UTC+3	Kwateh 5'; Ricky 47'	Report	S. Bojang 30'	Stadium: Limak Football Complex; Attendance: 0

==== 2020 AFC U-19 Championship ====
The 2020 AFC U-19 Championship was cancelled after the draw for the group stage was conducted.

March 2021 Group A	Indonesia	Cancelled	Cambodia	Tashkent, Uzbekistan
				Stadium: Bunyodkor Stadium

March 2021 Group A	Iran	Cancelled	Indonesia	Tashkent, Uzbekistan
				Stadium: Bunyodkor Stadium

March 2021 Group A	Uzbekistan	Cancelled	Indonesia	Tashkent, Uzbekistan
				Stadium: Bunyodkor Stadium

=== Women's national football team ===
==== 2022 AFC Women's Asian Cup qualification ====
24 September 2021 Group C	Singapore	0–1	Indonesia	Dushanbe, Tajikistan
18:00 UTC+5		Report	Amiatun 4'	Stadium: Republican Central Stadium; Attendance: 0 Referee: Lee Yi-chi (Chinese Taipei)

27 September 2021 Group C	Indonesia	1–0	Singapore	Dushanbe, Tajikistan
18:00 UTC+5	Nurmalita 30'	Report		Stadium: Republican Central Stadium; Attendance: 0 Referee: Choki Om (Bhutan)

== See also ==
- 2021–22 Liga 2
- 2021–22 Liga 3
- 2022 Piala Indonesia
