= 2020 Liga 1 (Indonesia) =

4th season of Liga 1

Liga 1
- Season: 2020
- Dates: 29 February 2020 – 20 January 2021
- Champions: Not awarded
- Relegated: None
- AFC Cup: Bali United; Persipura
- Matches: 26
- Goals: 68 (2.62 per match)
- Top goalscorer: Wander Luiz (4 goals)
- Biggest home win: Madura United 4–0 Barito Putera (29 February 2020)
- Biggest away win: TIRA-Persikabo 0–2 Arema (2 March 2020)
- Highest scoring: Persebaya 3–4 Persipura (13 March 2020)
- Longest winning run: 3 matches Persib
- Longest unbeaten run: 3 matches Bali United; Bhayangkara; Persib; Persiraja; PSM
- Longest winless run: 3 matches Barito Putera; Bhayangkara; Persela; Persik; Persita; PSS
- Longest losing run: 3 matches Persela
- Highest attendance: 50,826; Persija 3–2 Borneo (1 March 2020)
- Lowest attendance: 0 Bhayangkara 2–2 Persija (14 March 2020)
- Total attendance: 352,344
- Average attendance: 13,552

The 2020 Liga 1, also known as Shopee Liga 1 for sponsorship reasons, was the 4th season of Liga 1 under its current name and the 11th season of the top-flight Indonesian professional league for association football clubs since its establishment in 2008. The season started on 29 February 2020 and was suspended on 16 March 2020 due to the COVID-19 pandemic. The season was abandoned and declared void on 20 January 2021.

Bali United were the defending champions. Persik, Persita, and Persiraja joined as the promoted teams from the 2019 Liga 2. They replace Badak Lampung, Kalteng Putra, and Semen Padang who were relegated to the 2020 Liga 2.

== Effects of the COVID-19 pandemic ==
The season was first suspended on 15 March 2020 after finishing matchday three amid increasing contagion risks from the COVID-19 pandemic. The initial plan was the suspension would end in late March. However, the suspension was extended to 29 May 2020 due to government restrictions on social gatherings.

On 27 June 2020, the Indonesian football association, PSSI, announced it would resume Liga 1 from October 2020. League organizer PT Liga Indonesia Baru (LIB) followed it up by announcing matchday four would be held on 1 October 2020 and the season would end on 28 February 2021, but with a note that this tentative schedule would need approval from authorities related to the management of the COVID-19 pandemic. The plan was to hold all matches without spectators and have no changes to the double round-robin format. Organizers were prepared to hold all matches on the main island of Java, where most teams are based, to mitigate contagion risks. Teams from outside Java and the capital Jakarta, which had the highest infection risks in the country, would be based in Yogyakarta, where the pandemic was relatively under control.

In a 17 July 2020 meeting, all teams agreed on further details for the resumption plan, including increasing substitutions from three to five, in line with a proposal by FIFA to lessen the impact of fixture congestion. The meeting also agreed that there would be no relegation and all teams must have a minimum of two U-20 local players. To mitigate infection risks, each team must conduct a swab test before the resumption and a rapid test every 14 days during the competition with LIB in charge of testing the day before matchday. LIB also would allow mid-season transfers between 21 September – 18 October 2020 but the transfers would not be recorded at FIFA Transfer Match System (TMS) to avoid conflict with FIFA regulations.

The plan began to crumble in September. On 29 September 2020, PSSI postponed the resumption of Liga 1 and Liga 2 for a month after failing to obtain permission from the police on fears that unruly fans would crowd outside the stadiums. After a month, on 29 October 2020, PSSI announced police had not changed their mind and declared the competition could not be held in 2020.

In November 2020, LIB made another attempt to resume the 2020 season in February 2021 with a plan to finish in July 2021. Police also blocked this plan. Eventually, on 15 January 2021, PSSI dismissed the 2020 season of Liga 1 and Liga 2 football leagues and declared them void of winners, relegations and promotions. Any resumption of professional football will be considered as a fresh start of a season.

The inability to finish the 2020 season impacted Indonesia's participation in the 2021 AFC Cup competition. Representatives had to be determined by the results of the previous domestic season. Bali United, the 2019 Liga 1 champions, was appointed as the first representative. The second appointment was not as straightforward. PSM, the 2018–19 Piala Indonesia winners, should have taken the spot but they failed to obtain an AFC license that is required for the hosting of an AFC match. The next on the pecking order was Persebaya, the 2019 Liga 1 runner-up, but they also missed the AFC hosting qualifications. As a result, Persipura, the league third place, qualified to take the second AFC Cup slot for Indonesia.

== Teams ==
Eighteen teams competed in the league – the top fifteen teams from the previous season and the three teams promoted from the Liga 2. The new teams this season were Persik, Persita, and Persiraja, who replaced Badak Lampung, Kalteng Putra, and Semen Padang.

=== Name changes ===
- TIRA-Persikabo were renamed to Persikabo 1973, but the name would be used starting next season.
- Bhayangkara relocated to Surakarta and were renamed Bhayangkara Solo.

=== Stadiums and locations ===
Original locations of the 2020–21 Liga 1 teams

Team	Location	Stadium	Capacity
Arema	Malang	Kanjuruhan	42,449
Bali United	Gianyar	Kapten I Wayan Dipta	23,081
Bali United	Bantul	Sultan Agung (Note: Stadium planned to be used for home games of non-Java teams for matches behind closed doors.)	35,000
Barito Putera	Martapura	Demang Lehman (Note: Barito Putera played their home matches at Demang Lehman due to the renovation of their stadium at May 17th.)	15,000
Barito Putera	Sleman	Maguwoharjo	31,700
Bhayangkara	Surakarta	Manahan	20,000
Borneo	Samarinda	Segiri	16,000
Borneo	Sleman	Maguwoharjo	31,700
Madura United	Pamekasan	Gelora Madura	15,000
Persebaya	Surabaya	Gelora Bung Tomo	55,000
Persela	Lamongan	Surajaya	16,000
Persib	Bandung	Si Jalak Harupat	27,000
Persib	Bandung	Gelora Bandung Lautan Api	38,000
Persija	Jakarta	Gelora Bung Karno (Note: Persija also registered Patriot Candrabhaga as their home stadium.)	77,193
Persija	Bantul	Sultan Agung	35,000
Persik	Kediri	Brawijaya	20,000
Persipura	Manado	Klabat (Note: Persipura played their home matches at Klabat due to the renovation of their stadium at Mandala for 2020 Indonesian National Games (PON XX).)	10,000
Persipura	Lamongan	Surajaya	16,000
Persiraja	Banda Aceh	Harapan Bangsa	45,000
Persiraja	Sleman	Maguwoharjo	31,700
Persita	Tangerang	Indomilk Arena	30,000
PSIS	Semarang	Citarum (Note: PSIS will play their home matches at Citarum because the rebuilding of their stadium at Jatidiri isn't finished yet. They also registered Moch. Soebroto and Kebondalem.)	7,000
PSM	Makassar	Andi Mattalata	15,000
PSM	Bantul	Sultan Agung	35,000
PSS	Sleman	Maguwoharjo	31,700
TIRA-Persikabo	Cibinong	Pakansari	30,000

=== Personnel and kits ===
Note: Flags indicate national team as has been defined under FIFA eligibility rules. Players and coaches may hold more than one non-FIFA nationality.

Team	Head coach	Captain	Kit manufacturer	Shirt Sponsor(s)
Arema	(Brazil) Carlos Oliveira	(Indonesia) Hendro Siswanto	Made by club	Ms Glow for Men^{1}, Krating Daeng^{1}, Indomie^{1}, Joseph Refo Investment Inc^{1}
Bali United	(Brazil) Stefano Cugurra	(Indonesia) Fadil Sausu	Made by club	OVO^{1}, Envi^{1}, Indofood^{1}, Smartfren^{1}, Wuling Motors^{1}, Bank Ina^{1}, KukuBima Ener-G!^{1}, Alderon^{1}, Coco Mart^{1}, Bengkel BOS^{1}, CBN Fiber^{2}, Indomie^{2}, Achilles^{2}, Ms Glow for Men^{3}, Buana Capital^{3}, YCAB Foundation^{3}, TOA^{4}
Barito Putera	(Indonesia) Djadjang Nurdjaman	(Indonesia) Rizky Pora	Made by club	Hasnur Group^{1}
Bhayangkara	(Northern Ireland) Paul Munster	(Indonesia) Indra Kahfi	SPECS	BNI^{1}, Jatim Park Group^{1}, Gojek^{1}, Go-Pay^{1}, Bright Gas^{2}, Jasa Raharja^{3}
Borneo	(Argentina) Mario Gómez	(Indonesia) Diego Michiels	RIORS	Feast^{1}, BIB^{1}, KukuBima Ener-G!^{1}, Ansaf^{1}, Fun88 Bola^{1}, Bank Kaltimtara^{2}
Madura United	(Indonesia) Rahmad Darmawan	(Indonesia) Slamet Nurcahyono	XTEN (Note: Madura United used MBB as their kit manufacturer before changed it from week 4.)	Pojur^{1}, Lion Group^{1}, KukuBima Ener-G!^{1}, Integra Group^{1}, Kangean Energy Indonesia^{1}, Kopi ABC^{2}, Tiket.com^{3}
Persebaya	(Indonesia) Aji Santoso	(Indonesia) Hansamu Yama	Made by club	Extra Joss^{1}, Kapal Api^{1}, Muhammadiyah University of Surabaya^{2}, MPM Distributor Honda^{3}
Persela	(Indonesia) Nil Maizar	(Indonesia) Eky Taufik	Made by club	So Nice^{1}, Extra Joss^{2}
Persib	(Netherlands) Robert Alberts	(Indonesia) Supardi Nasir	Sportama	Pria Punya Selera^{1}, Halodoc^{1}, Indofood^{1}, Mobil^{1}, Permata Bank Syariah^{1}, Kopi ABC^{2}, Azzuri^{2}, Envi^{3}, Didimax^{3}, Indomie^{3}
Persija	(Indonesia) Sudirman	(Indonesia) Andritany Ardhiyasa	Juara	Krating Daeng^{1}, Amman Mineral^{1}, Indomie^{1}, Bank DKI^{1}, Ithaca Resources^{3}
Persik	(Indonesia) Budi Sudarsono	(Indonesia) Faris Aditama	Noij (Note: Persik used MBB as their kit manufacturer before changed it from week 4.)	Biznet^{1}^{2}, Greenland Kediri^{2}
Persipura	(Brazil) Jacksen F. Tiago	(Indonesia) Boaz Solossa	SPECS	KukuBima Ener-G!^{1}, Bank Papua^{1}, PT Freeport Indonesia^{1}
Persiraja	(Indonesia) Hendri Susilo	(Indonesia) Mukhlis Nakata	Adhoc (Note: Persiraja used MBB as their kit manufacturer before changed it from week 4.)	Dek Gam Foundation^{1}, Bank Aceh^{1}, Lion Parcel^{1}, Kyriad Hotel Muraya Aceh^{1}, Extra Joss^{2}, PDAM Tirta Daroy^{2}, The Atjeh Connection^{3}
Persita	(Indonesia) Widodo C. Putro	(Indonesia) Egi Melgiansyah	Made by club	Palang Merah Indonesia^{1}, Matrix^{1}, Indomilk^{1}, Moya^{1}, Krating Daeng^{2}, Indomie^{2}, SOS Children's Villages^{2}, Aetra^{3}
PSIS	(Montenegro) Dragan Đukanović	(Brazil) Wallace Costa	RIORS	DBAsia.news^{1}, Indomie^{1}, Charlie Hospital^{1}, Extra Joss^{2}, Pegadaian^{3}
PSM	Vacant	(Netherlands) Wiljan Pluim	Umbro	Semen Bosowa^{1}, Kalla Group^{1}, Honda^{2}, KukuBima Ener-G!^{3}
PSS	(Serbia) Dejan Antonić	(Indonesia) Bagus Nirwanto	Sembada	Krating Daeng^{1}, Indomie^{1}, ACEOFNEWS^{1}
TIRA-Persikabo	(Belarus) Igor Kriushenko	(Indonesia) Manahati Lestusen	DJ Sport	SBOTOP^{1}

Notes:

1. On the front of shirt.
2. On the back of shirt.
3. On the sleeves.
4. On the shorts.

Additionally, SPECS made referee kits and also supplied the match ball, the Illuzion II.

Apparel changes:

=== Coaching changes ===
Team	Outgoing coach	Manner of departure	Date of vacancy	Week	Table	Incoming coach	Date of appointment
Persik	(Indonesia) Budiardjo Thalib	End of contract	15 December 2019	Pre-season		(Indonesia) Joko Susilo	4 January 2020
PSM	(Bosnia and Herzegovina) Darije Kalezić	Resigned	23 December 2019	Pre-season		(Croatia) Bojan Hodak	31 December 2019
Arema	(Bosnia and Herzegovina) Milomir Šešlija	End of contract	23 December 2019	Pre-season		(Argentina) Mario Gómez	2 January 2020
Madura United	(Indonesia) Rasiman	Demoted to assistant coach	23 December 2019	Pre-season		(Indonesia) Rahmad Darmawan	23 December 2019
Borneo	(Argentina) Mario Gómez	End of contract	26 December 2019	Pre-season		(Brazil) Edson Tavares	4 January 2020
PSIS	(Indonesia) Bambang Nurdiansyah	Resigned	1 January 2020	Pre-season		(Montenegro) Dragan Đukanović	1 January 2020
Persija	(Brazil) Edson Tavares	End of contract	2 January 2020	Pre-season		(Brazil) Sérgio Farias	12 January 2020
PSS	(Indonesia) Seto Nurdiantoro	End of contract	12 January 2020	Pre-season		(Spain) Eduardo Pérez	15 January 2020
PSS	(Spain) Eduardo Pérez	Resigned	24 February 2020	Pre-season		(Serbia) Dejan Antonić	26 February 2020
Arema	(Argentina) Mario Gómez	Resigned	3 August 2020	4	12	(Brazil) Carlos Oliveira	17 September 2020
Borneo	(Brazil) Edson Tavares	Sacked	11 August 2020	4	3	(Argentina) Mario Gómez	21 August 2020
Persik	(Indonesia) Joko Susilo	Became technical director	13 August 2020	4	13	(Indonesia) Budi Sudarsono	13 August 2020
Persija	(Brazil) Sérgio Farias	Mutual consent	10 September 2020	4	9	(Indonesia) Sudirman	10 September 2020
PSM	(Croatia) Bojan Hodak	Signed by Kuala Lumpur United	9 January 2021	4	6		

== Foreign players ==
Football Association of Indonesia restricted the number of foreign players to four per team, including one slot for a player from AFC countries. Teams can use all the foreign players at once.

- Players name in **bold** indicates the player was registered during the mid-season transfer window.
- Former Player(s) were players that out of squad or left club within the season, after pre-season transfer window, or in the mid-season transfer window, and at least had one appearance.

Team	Player 1	Player 2	Player 3	Asian Player	Former Player(s)
Arema	(Brazil) **Bruno Smith**	(Brazil) **Caio Ruan**			(Argentina) Elías Alderete (Argentina) Jonatan Bauman (South Korea) Oh In-kyun (Uruguay) Matías Malvino
Bali United	(Brazil) Willian Pacheco	(Iraq) Brwa Nouri	(Netherlands) Melvin Platje		(Portugal) Paulo Sérgio
Barito Putera	(Brazil) Cássio	(Serbia) Aleksandar Rakić	(Serbia) Danilo Sekulić		(Palestine) Yashir Islame
Bhayangkara	(Brazil) Renan Silva	(Chad) Ezechiel N'Douassel	(South Korea) Lee Won-jae		(Ivory Coast) Hervé Guy
Borneo	(Tajikistan) Nuriddin Davronov	(Uzbekistan) Javlon Guseynov			(Brazil) Diogo Campos (Brazil) Torres
Madura United	(Australia) Jacob Pepper	(Brazil) Bruno Matos	(Brazil) Jaimerson		(Ghana) Emmanuel Oti Essigba
Persebaya	(Australia) Aryn Williams				(Brazil) David da Silva (Mali) Makan Konaté (Palestine) Mahmoud Eid
Persela	(Brazil) Gabriel do Carmo	(Brazil) Marquinhos Carioca	(Iraq) Brian Ferreira		(Brazil) Rafinha (Japan) Shunsuke Nakamura (North Macedonia) Jasmin Mecinović
Persib	(Brazil) Wander Luiz	(Netherlands) Geoffrey Castillion	(Netherlands) Nick Kuipers	(Philippines) Omid Nazari	
Persija	(Brazil) **Yann Motta**	(Croatia) Marko Šimić	(Italy) Marco Motta	(Nepal) Rohit Chand	(Netherlands) Marc Klok (Note: Gained Indonesian citizenship)
Persik					(Argentina) Gaspar Vega (Australia) Ante Bakmaz (Brazil) Jefferson Oliveira (Serbia) Nikola Ašćerić
Persipura	(Japan) Takuya Matsunaga				(Brazil) Arthur Cunha (Brazil) Thiago Amaral (Netherlands) Sylvano Comvalius
Persiraja					(Brazil) Bruno Dybal (Brazil) Vanderlei (England) Adam Mitter (Lebanon) Samir Ayass
Persita	(Kyrgyzstan) Tamirlan Kozubaev	(Ukraine) Yevhen Budnik			(Argentina) Mateo Bustos (Bosnia and Herzegovina) Eldar Hasanović
PSIS	(Brazil) Bruno Silva	(Brazil) Flávio Beck	(Brazil) Wallace Costa	(Palestine) Jonathan Cantillana	
PSM	(Netherlands) Wiljan Pluim				(Bosnia and Herzegovina) Šerif Hasić (Brazil) Giancarlo (Lebanon) Hussein Eldor
PSS	(Brazil) Guilherme Batata	(Liberia) Zah Rahan Krangar	(Ukraine) Yevhen Bokhashvili	(Australia) Aaron Evans	
TIRA-Persikabo	(Brazil) Alex Gonçalves	(Brazil) Ciro Alves			(Finland) Petteri Pennanen (Uzbekistan) Artyom Filiposyan

Source: First transfer window

== League table ==
Pos	Team	Pld	W	D	L	GF	GA	GD	Pts	Qualification or relegation
1	Persib	3	3	0	0	7	2	+5	9	
2	Bali United	3	2	1	0	5	2	+3	7	Qualification for the 2021 AFC Cup group stage (Note: Bali United qualified for the 2021 AFC Cup group stage as the 2019 Liga 1 champions.)
3	Borneo	3	2	0	1	6	4	+2	6	
4	Persipura	3	2	0	1	6	5	+1	6	Qualification for the 2021 AFC Cup play-off round (Note: Persipura qualified for the 2021 AFC Cup play-off round as the 2019 Liga 1 third place.)
5	PSIS	3	2	0	1	5	4	+1	6	
6	PSM	3	1	2	0	4	3	+1	5	
7	Persiraja	3	1	2	0	1	0	+1	5	
8	Madura United	3	1	1	1	5	3	+2	4	
9	Persija	2	1	1	0	5	4	+1	4	
10	TIRA-Persikabo	3	1	1	1	3	3	0	4	
11	Bhayangkara	3	0	3	0	3	3	0	3	
12	Arema	3	1	0	2	3	4	−1	3	
13	Persik	3	0	2	1	2	3	−1	2	
14	Persita	3	0	2	1	2	4	−2	2	
15	Persebaya	2	0	1	1	4	5	−1	1	
16	PSS	3	0	1	2	2	4	−2	1	
17	Barito Putera	3	0	1	2	2	7	−5	1	
18	Persela	3	0	0	3	3	8	−5	0	

Source: Shopee Liga 1 2020, Soccerway
Rules for classification: 1) Points; 2) Head-to-head; 3) Goal difference; 4) Goals scored; 5) Drawing.

== Results ==
Home \ Away	ARE	BLU	BPT	BHA	BOR	MDU	PBY	PSL	PSB	PSJ	KDR	PPR	RAJ	PTA	SMG	PSM	PSS	TIR
Arema	—						a		1–2									
Bali United		—				3–1								0–0				
Barito Putera		1–2	—															
Bhayangkara				—						2–2								
Borneo					—			2–1				2–0						
Madura United			4–0			—							0–0					
Persebaya	a						—				1–1	3–4						
Persela								—							2–3			
Persib								3–0	—	a							2–1	
Persija					3–2				a	—								
Persik				1–1							—		0–1					
Persipura												—			2–0			
Persiraja				0–0									—					
Persita														—		1–1		
PSIS	2–0														—			
PSM			1–1													—	2–1	
PSS																	—	0–0
TIRA-Persikabo	0–2													3–1				—

Source: Shopee Liga 1 2020, Soccerway
Legend: Blue = home team win; Yellow = draw; Red = away team win.
For upcoming matches, an "a" indicates there is an article about the rivalry between the two participants.

== Season statistics ==
=== Top goalscorers ===
Rank	Player	Team	Goals
1	(Brazil) Wander Luiz	Persib	4
2	(Indonesia) Alberto Gonçalves	Madura United	3
3	(Indonesia) Kushedya Hari Yudo	Arema	2
3	(Netherlands) Melvin Platje	Bali United	2
3	(Brazil) Renan Silva	Bhayangkara	2
3	(Brazil) Torres	Borneo	2
3	(Brazil) Rafinha	Persela	2
3	(Netherlands) Geoffrey Castillion	Persib	2
3	(Indonesia) Evan Dimas	Persija	2
3	(Brazil) Thiago Amaral	Persipura	2
3	(Brazil) Bruno Silva	PSIS	2

=== Discipline ===
- Most yellow card(s): 3
  - (Uzbekistan) Artyom Filiposyan (Persikabo 1973)
- Most red card(s): 1
  - (Argentina) Jonatan Bauman (Arema)
  - (Brazil) Gabriel do Carmo (Persela)
  - (Indonesia) Andri Ibo (Persik)
  - (Australia) Ante Bakmaz (Persik)
  - (Brazil) Arthur Cunha (Persipura)
  - (Indonesia) Feri Komul (Persiraja)
  - (Indonesia) Finky Pasamba (PSIS)
  - (Indonesia) Safrudin Tahar (PSIS)
  - (Indonesia) Derry Rachman (PSS)

== Attendances ==
Pos	Team	Total	High	Low	Average	Change
1	Persija	50,826	50,826	50,826	50,826	+109.1%
2	Persebaya	62,227	50,000	12,227	31,114	+88.9%
3	Persiraja	26,510	26,510	26,510	26,510	+277.1%^{†}
4	Persib	51,927	26,677	25,250	25,964	+72.3%
5	Arema	23,781	23,781	23,781	23,781	+67.7%
6	PSIS	16,272	16,272	16,272	16,272	+80.6%
7	Persik	23,642	12,600	11,042	11,821	+50.4%^{†}
8	Persita	10,019	10,019	10,019	10,019	+80.5%^{†}
9	PSM	19,855	12,317	7,538	9,928	+29.5%
10	Persela	8,956	8,956	8,956	8,956	+13.4%
11	TIRA-Persikabo	16,870	9,962	6,908	8,435	+47.0%
12	Bali United	14,774	8,223	6,551	7,387	−56.4%
13	Borneo	9,522	5,351	4,171	4,761	+50.1%
14	Barito Putera	4,481	4,481	4,481	4,481	−6.4%
15	Persipura	3,428	3,428	3,428	3,428	−2.7%
16	PSS	3,118	3,118	3,118	3,118	−83.5%
17	Madura United	6,136	3,865	2,271	3,068	−8.6%
18	Bhayangkara	0	0	0	0	−100.0%
	League total	352,344	50,826	0	13,552	+44.8%

Source: Shopee Liga 1 2020
Notes:
^{†} Teams played previous season in Liga 2

== See also ==
- 2020 Liga 2
- 2020 Liga 3
- 2020 Piala Indonesia
