= 2019 Liga 1 (Indonesia) =

Liga 1
- Season: 2019
- Dates: 15 May – 22 December 2019
- Champions: Bali United; 1st Liga 1 title 1st Indonesian title
- Relegated: Badak Lampung; Semen Padang; Kalteng Putra
- AFC Champions League: Bali United
- AFC Cup: PSM
- Matches: 306
- Goals: 838 (2.74 per match)
- Best player: Renan Silva
- Top goalscorer: Marko Šimić (28 goals)
- Biggest home win: Borneo 6–0 Bali United (18 October 2019)
- Biggest away win: Persela 1–5 Madura United (17 May 2019); Barito Putera 0–4 Persipura (23 August 2019); PSIS 0–4 Persebaya (20 September 2019)
- Highest scoring: TIRA-Persikabo 5–3 Persija (16 July 2019); PSM 6–2 Arema (16 October 2019)
- Longest winning run: 8 matches Bali United
- Longest unbeaten run: 13 matches TIRA-Persikabo
- Longest winless run: 16 matches TIRA-Persikabo
- Longest losing run: 5 matches Kalteng Putra; Madura United
- Highest attendance: 70,136; Persija 1–1 Persib (10 July 2019)
- Lowest attendance: 0 Persipura 2–0 Persela (15 September 2019); PSIS 0–4 Persebaya (Note: This was a match without spectators, although in the end many supporters broke into the stadium.) (20 September 2019); Persipura 1–3 Persib (23 September 2019); Persebaya 3–2 PSM (14 November 2019); Persebaya 1–1 Semen Padang (28 November 2019); Persebaya 4–1 Arema (12 December 2019); Persebaya 2–1 Badak Lampung (21 December 2019); Kalteng Putra 1–3 Persija (21 December 2019)
- Total attendance: 2,863,876
- Average attendance: 9,359

The 2019 Liga 1, also known as Shopee Liga 1 for sponsorship reasons, was the 3rd season of Liga 1 under its current name and the 10th season of the top-flight Indonesian professional league for association football clubs since its establishment in 2008. The season started on 15 May 2019 and finished on 22 December 2019. Fixtures for the 2019 season were announced on 7 May 2019.

Persija were the defending champions. PSS, Semen Padang, and Kalteng Putra joined as the promoted teams from the 2018 Liga 2. They replace Mitra Kukar, Sriwijaya, and PSMS who were relegated to the 2019 Liga 2.

On 2 December 2019, Bali United won the championship for the first time in their history, becoming the seventh club to win the Liga 1 following a win against Semen Padang, after second-placed Borneo drew against PSM, giving Bali United a 17-point lead with only four games left.

== Teams ==
Eighteen teams competed in the league – the top fifteen teams from the previous season and the three teams promoted from the Liga 2. The new teams this season were PSS, Semen Padang, and Kalteng Putra, who replaced Mitra Kukar, Sriwijaya, and PSMS.

=== Name changes ===
- PS TIRA merged with Persikabo into TIRA-Persikabo and relocated to Cibinong.
- Perseru relocated to Bandar Lampung and were renamed to Badak Lampung.

=== Stadiums and locations ===
Locations of the 2019 Liga 1 teams

Team	Location	Stadium	Capacity
Arema	Malang	Kanjuruhan (Note: Arema also registered Gajayana as their home stadium.)	42,449
Badak Lampung	Bandar Lampung	Sumpah Pemuda	15,000
Bali United	Gianyar	Kapten I Wayan Dipta	25,081
Barito Putera	Martapura	Demang Lehman (Note: Barito Putera played the rest of their home matches at Demang Lehman due to the renovation of their stadium at May 17th.)	15,000
Bhayangkara	Jakarta	PTIK (Note: Bhayangkara also registered Patriot Candrabhaga and Madya Senayan as their home stadium as PTIK was renovated during the competition.)	3,000
Borneo	Samarinda	Segiri	16,000
Kalteng Putra	Palangka Raya	Tuah Pahoe (Note: Kalteng Putra played some of the early home matches at the Sultan Agung, Bantul because Tuah Pahoe was still under renovation.)	5,000
Madura United	Pamekasan	Gelora Madura (Note: Madura United played their home matches in the second half of the season at Gelora Bangkalan, Bangkalan because Gelora Madura was renovated to meet AFC requirements.)	15,000
Persebaya	Surabaya	Gelora Bung Tomo	55,000
Persela	Lamongan	Surajaya	16,000
Persib	Bandung	Si Jalak Harupat	27,000
Persija	Jakarta	Gelora Bung Karno (Note: Persija also registered Patriot Candrabhaga, Madya Senayan, and Wibawa Mukti as their backup stadium if they don't have police permit to hold the match in Gelora Bung Karno.)	77,193
Persipura	Jayapura	Mandala (Note: Persipura played their home matches in the second half of the season at either Gelora Delta, Sidoarjo or Aji Imbut, Tenggarong starting from September 2019 because Mandala was being renovated for 2020 Indonesian National Games (PON XX).)	30,000
PSIS	Magelang	Moch. Soebroto (Note: PSIS played their home matches at Moch. Soebroto because the rebuilding of their stadium at Jatidiri isn't finished yet.)	20,000
PSM	Makassar	Andi Mattalata	15,000
PSS	Sleman	Maguwoharjo	31,700
Semen Padang	Padang	Haji Agus Salim	15,000
TIRA-Persikabo	Cibinong	Pakansari	30,000

=== Personnel and kits ===
Note: Flags indicate national team as has been defined under FIFA eligibility rules. Players and coaches may hold more than one non-FIFA nationality.

Team	Head coach	Captain	Kit manufacturer	Shirt Sponsor(s)
Arema	(Bosnia and Herzegovina) Milomir Šešlija	(Indonesia) Hamka Hamzah	Made by Club (Note: Arema used Munich as their kit manufacturer before changed it from week 14.)	Corsa^{1}, Achilles^{1}, Indomie^{1}, Gojek^{1}, Joseph Refo Investment Inc^{1}, Torabika Duo^{2}
Badak Lampung	(Slovenia) Milan Petrović	(Indonesia) Talaohu Musafri	Made by Club	Bukalapak^{1}, Kredit Plus^{1}, Sunpride^{2}
Bali United	(Brazil) Stefano Cugurra	(Indonesia) Fadil Sausu	Made by Club	Mobil^{1}, Gojek^{1}, Envi^{1}, Torabika^{1}, Indofood^{1}, Smartfren^{1}, Bank Ina^{1}, Achilles^{1}, KukuBima Ener-G!^{1}, YCAB Foundation^{1}, Ottopay^{1}, Elevenia^{2}, Indomie^{2}, Buana Capital^{2}, ACA Asuransi^{3}, Kresna Securities^{3}, PEDE Ponsel Duit^{4}
Barito Putera	(Indonesia) Djadjang Nurdjaman	(Indonesia) Rizky Pora	Made by Club	Hasnur Group^{1}, Jhonlin Group^{1}, Haji Maming^{2}
Bhayangkara	(Northern Ireland) Paul Munster	(Indonesia) Indra Kahfi	Lotto	Bank BRI^{1}, Gojek^{1}, Go-Pay^{1}, Jatim Park 2^{1}, Bright Gas^{2}, Jasa Raharja^{3}
Borneo	(Argentina) Mario Gómez	(Indonesia) Diego Michiels	Made by Club	Fun88 Bola^{1}, Shinhan Bank^{1}, Ansaf^{1}, BIB^{1}, KukuBima Ener-G!^{1}, GlowOne^{2}
Kalteng Putra	(Brazil) Gomes de Olivera	(Indonesia) I Gede Sukadana	MBB	Halo Dayak^{1}, Bank Kalteng^{1}
Madura United	(Indonesia) Rasiman	(Indonesia) Greg Nwokolo	MBB	Lion Group^{1}, Buccheri^{1}, Pojur^{1}, Integra Group^{1}, Insight^{2}, Tiket.com^{3}
Persebaya	(Indonesia) Aji Santoso	(Indonesia) Ruben Sanadi	Made by Club	Safe Care^{1}, Kapal Api^{1}, Gojek^{1}, Antangin^{2}, Reliance^{2}, MPM Distributor Honda^{3}
Persela	(Indonesia) Nil Maizar	(Indonesia) Eky Taufik	Forium	So Nice^{1}, North Cliff^{1}
Persib	(Netherlands) Robert Alberts	(Indonesia) Supardi Nasir	Sportama	Pria Punya Selera^{1}, Salvus^{1}, Elevenia^{1}, Halodoc^{1}, Corsa^{1}, Indofood^{1}, Mobil^{1}, Gojek^{1}, Permata Bank Syariah^{1}, Azzuri^{2}, Kopi ABC^{2}, Didimax^{3}, Envi^{3}, Indomie^{3}
Persija	(Brazil) Edson Tavares	(Indonesia) Andritany Ardhiyasa	Specs	Bank DKI^{1}, Krating Daeng^{1}, Indomie^{1}, Rasuna Epicentrum^{1}, Jungleland Sentul^{1}, Gojek^{1}, Tolak Angin^{2}
Persipura	(Brazil) Jacksen F. Tiago	(Indonesia) Boaz Solossa	Specs	PT Freeport Indonesia^{1}, Bank Papua^{1}
PSIS	(Indonesia) Bambang Nurdiansyah	(Brazil) Wallace Costa (Note: Wallace Costa replaced Hari Nur Yulianto as team captain starting from week 15.)	RIORS	Gojek^{1}, Indomie^{1}, KukuBima Ener-G!^{3}
PSM	(Bosnia and Herzegovina) Darije Kalezić	(Netherlands) Wiljan Pluim	Umbro	Semen Bosowa^{1}, Honda^{2}, KukuBima Ener-G!^{3}, Kalla Group^{3}
PSS	(Indonesia) Seto Nurdiantoro	(Indonesia) Bagus Nirwanto	Sembada	Indomie^{1}, Gojek^{1}, Muncul Group^{3}, Curva Sud Shop^{3}
Semen Padang	(Portugal) Eduardo Almeida	(Indonesia) Dedi Gusmawan (Note: Dedi Gusmawan replaced Irsyad Maulana as team captain starting from week 18.)	Lotto	Corsa^{1}, Oxygen^{1}, Semen Indonesia^{1}, Torabika^{1}
TIRA-Persikabo	(Belarus) Igor Kriushenko	(Indonesia) Manahati Lestusen	MBB	Sequis^{1}, Kresna Securities^{1}, Artha Graha Peduli Foundation^{1}, M88FC^{1}, Oasis Waters^{1}

Notes:

1. On the front of shirt.
2. On the back of shirt.
3. On the sleeves.
4. On the shorts.

Additionally, referee kits are made by Specs and Mitre supplied the match ball.

Apparel and captain changes:

=== Coaching changes ===
- Indicate the positions in the relegation zone.

Team	Outgoing coach	Manner of departure	Date of vacancy	Week	Table	Incoming coach	Date of appointment
Arema	(Slovenia) Milan Petrović	End of contract	10 December 2018	Pre-season		(Bosnia and Herzegovina) Milomir Šešlija	9 January 2019
Persib	(Argentina) Mario Gómez	Sacked	12 December 2018	Pre-season		(Montenegro) Miljan Radović	9 January 2019
Madura United	(Brazil) Gomes de Olivera	Sacked	17 December 2018	Pre-season		(Serbia) Dejan Antonić	13 January 2019
Bhayangkara	(Scotland) Simon McMenemy	Signed by Indonesia	20 December 2018	Pre-season		(Argentina) Alfredo Vera	5 February 2019
Borneo	(Serbia) Dejan Antonić	End of contract	31 December 2018	Pre-season		(Italy) Fabio Lopez	5 January 2019
Kalteng Putra	(Indonesia) Kas Hartadi	End of contract	31 December 2018	Pre-season		(Brazil) Gomes de Olivera	15 January 2019
Badak Lampung	(Brazil) Wanderley da Silva	End of contract	1 January 2019	Pre-season		(Indonesia) Jan Saragih	11 March 2019
TIRA-Persikabo	(Indonesia) Nil Maizar	Mutual consent	2 January 2019	Pre-season		(Indonesia) Rahmad Darmawan	2 January 2019
Persija	(Brazil) Stefano Cugurra	End of contract	4 January 2019	Pre-season		(Bulgaria) Ivan Kolev	15 January 2019
PSM	(Netherlands) Robert Alberts	Resigned	12 January 2019	Pre-season		(Bosnia and Herzegovina) Darije Kalezić	2 February 2019
Persipura	(Brazil) Osvaldo Lessa	Mutual consent	13 January 2019	Pre-season		(Brazil) Luciano Leandro	22 January 2019
Bali United	(Indonesia) Eko Purjianto	End of caretaker role	14 January 2019	Pre-season		(Brazil) Stefano Cugurra	14 January 2019
Borneo	(Italy) Fabio Lopez	Sacked	8 April 2019	Pre-season		(Argentina) Mario Gómez	15 April 2019
Persib	(Montenegro) Miljan Radović	Sacked	3 May 2019	Pre-season		(Netherlands) Robert Alberts	3 May 2019
Persija	(Bulgaria) Ivan Kolev	Resigned	3 June 2019	3	16	(Spain) Julio Bañuelos	8 June 2019
Barito Putera	(Brazil) Jacksen F. Tiago	Resigned	23 June 2019	5	18	(Indonesia) Yunan Helmi	25 June 2019
Persela	(Indonesia) Aji Santoso	Resigned	30 June 2019	6	17	(Indonesia) Nil Maizar	4 July 2019
Persipura	(Brazil) Luciano Leandro	Sacked	30 June 2019	6	15	(Brazil) Jacksen F. Tiago	11 July 2019
Semen Padang	(Indonesia) Syafrianto Rusli	Resigned	8 July 2019	7	16	(Indonesia) Welliansyah (Note: Welliansyah was initially appointed as caretaker manager, but the move was made permanent on 26 July 2019.)	8 July 2019
Badak Lampung	(Indonesia) Jan Saragih	Sacked	28 July 2019	11	15	(Slovenia) Milan Petrović	29 July 2019
PSIS	(Indonesia) Jafri Sastra	Sacked	8 August 2019	13	10	(Indonesia) Widyantoro	8 August 2019
Persebaya	(Indonesia) Djadjang Nurdjaman	Sacked	10 August 2019	13	7	(Indonesia) Bejo Sugiantoro	10 August 2019
Bhayangkara	(Argentina) Alfredo Vera	Sacked	14 August 2019	14	8	(Indonesia) Yeyen Tumena	14 August 2019
PSIS	(Indonesia) Widyantoro	End of caretaker role	19 August 2019	15	13	(Indonesia) Bambang Nurdiansyah	19 August 2019
Barito Putera	(Indonesia) Yunan Helmi	End of caretaker role	21 August 2019	15	15	(Indonesia) Djadjang Nurdjaman	21 August 2019
Bhayangkara	(Indonesia) Yeyen Tumena	End of caretaker role	22 August 2019	15	9	(Northern Ireland) Paul Munster	22 August 2019
Madura United	(Serbia) Dejan Antonić	Resigned	24 August 2019	16	5	(Indonesia) Rasiman (Note: Rasiman was initially appointed as caretaker manager, but the move was made permanent on 5 September 2019.)	24 August 2019
Semen Padang	(Indonesia) Welliansyah	Demoted to assistant coach	12 September 2019	17	18	(Portugal) Eduardo Almeida	12 September 2019
Persija	(Spain) Julio Bañuelos	Sacked	19 September 2019	19	15	(Indonesia) Sudirman	20 September 2019
Persebaya	(Indonesia) Bejo Sugiantoro	End of caretaker role	25 September 2019	20	5	(Austria) Wolfgang Pikal	25 September 2019
Persija	(Indonesia) Sudirman	End of caretaker role	29 September 2019	21	14	(Brazil) Edson Tavares	29 September 2019
Persebaya	(Austria) Wolfgang Pikal	Resigned	30 October 2019	25	9	(Indonesia) Aji Santoso	31 October 2019
TIRA-Persikabo	(Indonesia) Rahmad Darmawan	Sacked	29 November 2019	29	12	(Indonesia) Miftahudin Mukson	29 November 2019
TIRA-Persikabo	(Indonesia) Miftahudin Mukson	End of caretaker role	7 December 2019	31	12	(Belarus) Igor Kriushenko	7 December 2019

== Foreign players ==
Football Association of Indonesia restricted the number of foreign players to four per team, including one slot for a player from AFC countries. A team can use all four foreign players at once.

- Players name in **bold** indicates the player was registered during the mid-season transfer window.
- Former Player(s) were players that out of squad or left club within the season, after pre-season transfer window, or in the mid-season transfer window, and at least had one appearance.

Team	Player 1	Player 2	Player 3	Asian Player	Former Player(s)
Arema	(Brazil) Arthur Cunha	(Mali) Makan Konaté	(Netherlands) Sylvano Comvalius	(Japan) **Takafumi Akahoshi**	(Uzbekistan) Pavel Smolyachenko
Badak Lampung	(Brazil) Fernandinho	(Brazil) Marquinhos Carioca	(Serbia) **Bojan Mališić**	(Australia) **Antony Golec**	(Brazil) Torres (Japan) Kunihiro Yamashita
Bali United	(Brazil) Willian Pacheco	(Netherlands) Melvin Platje	(Portugal) Paulo Sérgio	(Iraq) Brwa Nouri	
Barito Putera	(Brazil) **Cássio**	(Brazil) Rafael Silva	(Brazil) **Torres**	(Japan) **Kosuke Uchida**	(Brazil) Artur Vieira (Brazil) Lucas Silva (South Korea) Yoo Jae-hoon
Bhayangkara	(Brazil) Anderson Salles	(Brazil) **Bruno Matos**	(Brazil) **Hédipo**	(South Korea) Lee Yoo-joon	(Argentina) Ramiro Fergonzi (Brazil) Flávio Beck
Borneo	(Argentina) Matías Conti	(Brazil) Renan Silva	(Uruguay) **Juan Alsina**	(Uzbekistan) Javlon Guseynov	(Netherlands) Jan Lammers
Kalteng Putra	(Brazil) **David Bala**	(Brazil) **Eydison**	(Brazil) Rafael Bonfim	(Japan) **Takuya Matsunaga**	(Brazil) Diogo Campos (Brazil) Hédipo (South Korea) Yoo Hyun-goo
Madura United	(Brazil) **Diego Assis**	(Brazil) Jaimerson	(Serbia) Aleksandar Rakić	(Australia) **Ante Bakmaz**	(Liberia) Zah Rahan Krangar
Persebaya	(Brazil) **David da Silva**	(Brazil) **Diogo Campos**	(Brazil) Otávio Dutra (Note: Otávio Dutra gained Indonesian citizenship on 27 September 2019, but he was registered as a foreign player because his naturalization process was completed after second transfer window closed.)	(Australia) **Aryn Williams**	(Bolivia) Damián Lizio (Guinea-Bissau) Amido Baldé (Tajikistan) Manuchekhr Dzhalilov
Persela	(Brazil) Alex Gonçalves	(Brazil) **Demerson**	(Brazil) Rafinha	(Japan) Kei Hirose	(Togo) Mawouna Amevor
Persib	(Chad) Ezechiel N'Douassel	(Netherlands) **Kevin van Kippersluis**	(Netherlands) **Nick Kuipers**	(Philippines) **Omid Nazari**	(Serbia) Bojan Mališić (Slovenia) Rene Mihelič (Turkmenistan) Artur Geworkýan
Persija	(Brazil) **Xandão**	(Croatia) Marko Šimić	(Spain) **Joan Tomàs**	(Nepal) Rohit Chand	(Brazil) Bruno Matos (France) Steven Paulle
Persipura	(Brazil) André Ribeiro	(Mali) Mamadou Samassa	(Sierra Leone) Ibrahim Conteh	(South Korea) Oh In-kyun	
PSIS	(Brazil) **Bruno Silva**	(Brazil) **Claudir**	(Brazil) Wallace Costa	(Palestine) **Jonathan Cantillana**	(Brazil) Patrick Mota (Japan) Shohei Matsunaga (Paraguay) Sílvio Escobar
PSM	(Guinea-Bissau) **Amido Baldé**	(Netherlands) Marc Klok	(Netherlands) Wiljan Pluim	(Australia) Aaron Evans	(Finland) Eero Markkanen
PSS	(Brazil) Guilherme Batata	(Spain) Alfonso de la Cruz	(Ukraine) Yevhen Bokhashvili	(Iraq) Brian Ferreira	
Semen Padang	(Brazil) **Flávio Beck**	(Brazil) **Vanderlei**	(Chad) Karl Max Barthélémy	(South Korea) **Yoo Hyun-goo**	(Uzbekistan) Shukurali Pulatov (Argentina) José Sardón (Argentina) Mario Barcia
TIRA-Persikabo	(Brazil) Ciro Alves	(Cameroon) Louise Parfait	(France) Loris Arnaud	(Tajikistan) Khurshed Beknazarov	

Source: First transfer window, Second transfer window

== League table ==
Pos	Team	Pld	W	D	L	GF	GA	GD	Pts	Qualification or relegation
1	Bali United (C)	34	19	7	8	48	35	+13	64	Qualification for the AFC Champions League preliminary round 1 and ASEAN Club Championship group stage
2	Persebaya (Note: Persebaya would have qualified for the AFC Cup group stage had Bali United qualified for the AFC Champions League group stage. As Bali United failed to qualify for the AFC Champions League group stage, Persebaya's qualification in the AFC Cup was annulled.)	34	14	12	8	57	43	+14	54	Qualification for the ASEAN Club Championship group stage
3	Persipura	34	14	11	9	47	38	+9	53 (Note: Head-to-head points: Persipura (+2) 9 pts; Bhayangkara (+2) 7 pts; Madura United (–4) 1 pts.)	
4	Bhayangkara	34	14	11	9	51	43	+8	53	
5	Madura United	34	15	8	11	55	44	+11	53	
6	Persib	34	13	12	9	49	39	+10	51 (Note: Head-to-head results: Persib 2–2 Borneo; Borneo 0–1 Persib.)	
7	Borneo	34	12	15	7	55	42	+13	51	
8	PSS	34	12	12	10	45	42	+3	48	
9	Arema	34	13	7	14	59	62	−3	46	
10	Persija	34	11	11	12	43	42	+1	44 (Note: Head-to-head points: Persija (+2) 8 pts; Persela (+0) 4 pts; PSM (–2) 4 pts.)	
11	Persela	34	11	11	12	47	45	+2	44	
12	PSM	34	13	5	16	50	50	0	44	Qualification for the AFC Cup play-off round (Note: PSM qualified for the AFC Cup play-off round as the 2018–19 Piala Indonesia winners.)
13	Barito Putera	34	11	10	13	45	51	−6	43 (Note: Head-to-head results: PSIS 0–0 Barito Putera; Barito Putera 2–0 PSIS.)	
14	PSIS	34	12	7	15	36	41	−5	43	
15	TIRA-Persikabo	34	10	12	12	51	57	−6	42	
16	Badak Lampung (R)	34	8	9	17	35	65	−30	33	Relegation to Liga 2
17	Semen Padang (R)	34	7	11	16	32	45	−13	32	Relegation to Liga 2
18	Kalteng Putra (R)	34	8	7	19	33	54	−21	31	Relegation to Liga 2

Source: Shopee Liga 1 2019, Soccerway
Rules for classification: 1) Points; 2) Head-to-head; 3) Goal difference; 4) Goals scored; 5) Drawing.
(C) Champions; (R) Relegated

== Results ==
Home \ Away	ARE	BDL	BLU	BPT	BHA	BOR	KTP	MDU	PBY	PSL	PSB	PSJ	PPR	SMG	PSM	PSS	SPD	TIR
Arema	—	4–1	3–2	2–1	3–2	2–2	1–1	2–0	4–0	3–2	5–1	1–1	3–1	1–1	2–0	4–0	1–0	1–2
Badak Lampung	4–3	—	0–3	3–3	2–3	1–1	2–1	3–0	1–3	1–1 (Note: Badak Lampung hosted Persela at Patriot Chandrabhaga because they didn't have police permit to hold this match at Sumpah Pemuda.)	1–1	2–0	0–1	0–1	1–1	0–2	0–1	2–2
Bali United	2–1	3–0	—	3–2	1–0	2–1	2–1	0–2	2–1	1–1	3–2	1–0	1–1	1–0	1–0	3–1	4–1	0–1
Barito Putera	3–0	4–1	1–0	—	1–4	1–0	1–2	0–1	1–0	0–0	1–0	1–1	0–4	2–0	3–2	1–0	0–3	2–4
Bhayangkara	1–0	0–1	0–0	4–2	—	1–1	1–0	1–1	0–2	3–1	0–0	3–0	0–1	0–0	3–2	0–2	2–2	1–1
Borneo	2–0	1–1	6–0	4–3	1–1 (Note: Borneo hosted Bhayangkara at Aji Imbut because Segiri was still under renovation.)	—	2–0	2–1	1–2	1–2	0–1	1–0	1–1	2–0	2–0	2–2	1–0	4–1
Kalteng Putra	4–2	0–1	2–2	1–1	3–2	0–1	—	1–4	1–1	2–0	0–2	1–3	0–0	0–0	3–1	0–2 (Note: Kalteng Putra hosted PSS at Maguwoharjo because they didn't have police permit to hold this match at Sultan Agung.)	2–0	1–0
Madura United	1–0	5–1	0–1	2–2	1–2	3–0	2–1	—	2–3	2–1	2–1	2–2	0–2	3–0	2–0	0–1	1–1	1–0
Persebaya	4–1	2–1	1–1	2–2	4–0	0–0	1–1	2–2	—	3–2	4–0	1–1	1–0	1–1	3–2 (Note: Persebaya hosted PSM at Batakan because they didn't have police permit to hold this match at Gelora Bung Tomo.)	2–3	1–1 (Note: Persebaya hosted Semen Padang at Batakan because Gelora Bung Tomo still under renovation.)	1–1
Persela	2–0	1–0	2–0	0–0	1–1	2–2	3–0	1–5	1–0	—	2–2	0–0	2–2	0–1	3–1	1–0	2–0	6–1
Persib	3–0	4–0	0–2	0–0	1–2	2–2	2–0	1–1	4–1 (Note: Persib hosted Persebaya at Kapten I Wayan Dipta because they didn't have police permit to hold this match at Jalak Harupat.)	0–2	—	2–0 (Note: Persib hosted Persija at Kapten I Wayan Dipta because they didn't have police permit to hold this match at Jalak Harupat.)	3–0	2–1	5–2	1–0	1–1	1–1
Persija	2–2	0–1	0–1	1–0	1–1	4–2	3–0 (Note: Persija hosted Kalteng Putra at Madya Senayan because Patriot was used by Bhayangkara.)	4–0	1–2	4–3	1–1	—	1–0	2–1	0–0	1–0	1–2	2–0
Persipura	2–2	1–1	2–2	1–0	1–3	2–2	2–0	1–0	0–1	2–0	1–3	2–0	—	2–0	3–1	1–1	1–1	3–0
PSIS	5–1	0–0	1–0	0–0	2–3	2–2	1–2	2–3	0–4	2–0	0–1	2–1	1–3	—	1–0	3–0 (Note: PSIS hosted PSS at Maguwoharjo because they didn't have police permit to hold this match at Moch. Soebroto.)	2–0	0–2
PSM	6–2	4–0	1–0	2–1	2–1	2–2	2–1	1–0	2–1	2–1	3–1	0–1	4–0	0–1	—	1–1	1–0	2–0
PSS	3–1	5–1	0–0	2–2	1–1	0–1	1–0	2–2	2–1	1–1	0–0	0–0	1–1	1–3	3–2	—	1–1	5–2
Semen Padang	0–1	1–2	0–2	2–3	2–3	1–1	1–0	1–2	0–0	2–0	0–0	2–2	1–2	1–0	2–1	0–1	—	1–3
TIRA-Persikabo	1–1	3–0	1–2	0–1	0–2 (Note: TIRA-Persikabo hosted Bhayangkara at PTIK because they didn't have police permit to hold this match at Pakansari.)	2–2	5–2	2–2	2–2	1–1	1–1	5–3	2–1	1–2	0–0	3–1	1–1	—

Source: Shopee Liga 1 2019, Soccerway
Legend: Blue = home team win; Yellow = draw; Red = away team win.
For upcoming matches, an "a" indicates there is an article about the rivalry between the two participants.

== Season statistics ==
=== Top goalscorers ===
Rank	Player	Team	Goals
1	(Croatia) Marko Šimić	Persija	28
2	(Indonesia) Alberto Gonçalves	Madura United	18
3	(Brazil) Alex Gonçalves	Persela	17
4	(Mali) Makan Konaté	Arema	16
4	(Indonesia) Ilija Spasojević	Bali United	16
4	(Ukraine) Yevhen Bokhashvili	PSS	16
7	(Chad) Ezechiel N'Douassel	Persib	15
8	(Brazil) Rafael Silva	Barito Putera	14
8	(Brazil) David da Silva	Persebaya	14
8	(Brazil) Ciro Alves	TIRA-Persikabo	14

=== Hat-tricks ===
Player	For	Against	Result	Date
(Brazil) Flávio Beck	Bhayangkara	Barito Putera	4–2 (H)	28 May 2019
(Guinea-Bissau) Amido Baldé	Persebaya	Persib	4–0 (H)	5 July 2019
(Brazil) Alex Gonçalves	Persela	Kalteng Putra	3–0 (H)	11 July 2019
(Croatia) Marko Šimić	Persija	TIRA-Persikabo	3–5 (A)	16 July 2019
(Mali) Makan Konaté	Arema	Badak Lampung	4–1 (H)	16 July 2019
(Brazil) Hédipo	Kalteng Putra	Bhayangkara	3–2 (H)	25 August 2019
(Brazil) Alex Gonçalves	Persela	TIRA-Persikabo	6–1 (H)	25 August 2019
(Brazil) Torres	Barito Putera	Badak Lampung	4–1 (H)	18 October 2019
(Brazil) Marquinhos Carioca	Badak Lampung	Arema	4–3 (H)	1 November 2019
(Croatia) Marko Šimić^{4}	Persija	Borneo	4–2 (H)	11 November 2019
(Argentina) Matías Conti	Borneo	TIRA-Persikabo	4–1 (H)	6 December 2019
(Croatia) Marko Šimić	Persija	Madura United	4–0 (H)	13 December 2019
(Chad) Ezechiel N'Douassel^{4}	Persib	PSM	5–2 (H)	22 December 2019

Note: ^{4} Player scored 4 goals

=== Discipline ===
- Most yellow card(s): 11
  - (Indonesia) Akbar Tanjung (Badak Lampung)
  - (Indonesia) Muhammad Tahir (Persipura)
- Most red card(s): 3
  - (Indonesia) Leonard Tupamahu (Bali United)

== Attendances ==
Pos	Team	Total	High	Low	Average	Change
1	Persija	413,152	70,136	4,124	24,303	+10.3%
2	PSS	321,451	32,176	5,112	18,909	+5.7%^{†}
3	Bali United	288,072	25,057	9,696	16,945	+11.5%
4	Persebaya	280,017	50,000	0	16,472	−42.3%
5	Persib	256,200	26,778	1,030	15,071	−5.9%
6	Arema	241,088	40,412	4,318	14,182	+26.4%
7	PSIS	153,202	17,245	0	9,012	−26.5%
8	Badak Lampung	140,492	13,069	672	8,264	+432.1%
9	Persela	134,296	17,000	3,707	7,900	−22.8%
10	PSM	130,337	14,327	2,174	7,667	−41.0%
11	TIRA-Persikabo	97,548	29,541	172	5,738	+284.3%
12	Semen Padang	89,481	10,500	2,142	5,264	−20.2%^{†}
13	Barito Putera	81,345	7,859	2,085	4,785	−4.9%
14	Persipura	59,890	14,263	0	3,523	−69.0%
15	Madura United	57,050	7,858	621	3,356	−30.9%
16	Borneo	53,913	6,725	785	3,171	−25.7%
17	Kalteng Putra	48,470	10,208	0	2,851	−49.5%^{†}
18	Bhayangkara	17,872	2,389	449	1,051	−72.2%
	League total	2,863,876	70,136	0	9,359	−7.9%

Source: Shopee Liga 1 2019
Notes:
^{†} Teams played previous season in Liga 2

== Awards ==
=== Annual ===
Award	Winner
Best Player	(Brazil) Renan Silva (Borneo)
Best Coach	(Brazil) Stefano Cugurra (Bali United)
Best Young Player	(Indonesia) Todd Ferre (Persipura)
Best Goal	(Brazil) David da Silva (Persebaya)
Fair Play Team	TIRA-Persikabo
Best Referee	(Indonesia) Yudi Nurcahya

=== Team of the season ===
Team of the season
Goalkeeper	(Indonesia) Wawan Hendrawan (Bali United)			
Defenders	(Indonesia) Asnawi Bahar (PSM)	(Indonesia) Ricardo Salampessy (Persipura)	(Uzbekistan) Javlon Guseynov (Borneo)	(Indonesia) Ruben Sanadi (Persebaya)
Midfielders	(Mali) Makan Konaté (Arema)	(Indonesia) Fadil Sausu (Bali United)	(Brazil) Renan Silva (Borneo)	(Indonesia) Todd Ferre (Persipura)
Forwards	(Croatia) Marko Šimić (Persija)		(Indonesia) Ilija Spasojević (Bali United)	

== See also ==
- 2019 Liga 2
- 2019 Liga 3
- 2018–19 Piala Indonesia
