= List of Indonesian football transfers 2020 =

This is a list of Indonesian football transfers in 2020. The transfer window for football players is divided into two periods. In 2020, the first period ran from 7 February to 10 March, and the second from 20 July to 6 August.

== Player regulation ==
=== Liga 1 ===
The regulations for players who play in Liga1 are as follows:

- The club can register players with at least 18 players and at most 33 players. Clubs that participate in AFC and / or AFF competitions can register a maximum of 36 players.
- Clubs are allowed to register 3 foreign players (non-citizens

Indonesia) and 1 additional foreign player (citizen of the AFC member).

- The club is required to register at least 3 goalkeepers. For clubs that do not meet this provision, LIB has the right not to authorize all players registered.
- The club can play U20 players in its main team at any time, as long as it has been approved in the Liga 1 U-20 registration period without reducing the 33/36 player quota.

== Transfer ==
All clubs without a flag are Indonesian clubs.
