= Finky Pasamba =

Indonesian footballer

Personal information
- Full name: Finky Pasamba
- Date of birth: 28 April 1993 (age 33)
- Place of birth: Ambon, Indonesia
- Height: 1.75 m (5 ft 9 in)
- Position: Defensive midfielder

Youth career
- 2006: PPSP Putra Polri
- 2006: Medco U15

Senior career*
| Years | Team | Apps | (Gls) |
| 2015 | PS Badung | 0 | (0) |
| 2017–2018 | PS Mojokerto Putra | 37 | (0) |
| 2019 | Borneo Samarinda | 7 | (0) |
| 2019–2022 | PSIS Semarang | 41 | (0) |
| 2022 | Bhayangkara | 4 | (0) |
| 2023 | RANS Nusantara | 11 | (0) |
| 2023–2024 | Malut United | 23 | (1) |
| 2025 | Persela Lamongan | 3 | (0) |
| 2026 | Persipal Palu | 7 | (0) |

International career
| 2007 | Indonesia U16 | 4 | (0) |
- * Club domestic league appearances and goals as of 18 April 2026

Finky Pasamba (born 28 April 1993) is an Indonesian professional footballer who plays as a defensive midfielder.

== Club career ==
=== PS Mojokerto Putra ===
In 2017, Finky Pasamba signed a contract with Indonesian Liga 2 club PS Mojokerto Putra.

=== Borneo ===
He was signed for Borneo F.C. to play in Liga 1 in the 2019 season. Pasamba made his league debut on 16 May 2019 in a match against Bhayangkara at the Segiri Stadium, Samarinda.

=== PSIS Semarang ===
In middle season 2019, Finky Pasamba signed a year contract with PSIS Semarang. He made his league debut on 11 September 2019 in a match against PSM Makassar at the Andi Mattalatta Stadium, Makassar.

=== Bhayangkara ===
Pasamba was signed for Bhayangkara F.C. to play in Liga 1 in the 2022–23 season. He made his league debut on 31 July 2022 in a match against Persik Kediri at the Brawijaya Stadium, Kediri.

=== RANS Nusantara ===
Finky Pasamba became RANS Nusantara F.C. in half of the 2022–23 Liga 1. Finky made his debut on 16 January 2023 in a match against PSIS Semarang at the Pakansari Stadium, Cibinong.

== International career ==
In 2007, Finky Pasamba represented the Indonesia U-16, in the 2008 AFC U-16 Championship qualification.

== Career statistics ==
=== Club ===
As of match played 18 April 2026

| Club | Season | League | | | Cup (Note: Includes Piala Indonesia) | | Continental | | Other | | Total | |
| Club | Season | Division | Apps | Goals | Apps | Goals | Apps | Goals | Apps | Goals | Apps | Goals |
|---|---|---|---|---|---|---|---|---|---|---|---|---|
| PS Mojokerto Putra | 2017 | Liga 2 | 18 | 0 | 0 | 0 | – | | 0 | 0 | 18 | 0 |
| PS Mojokerto Putra | 2018 | Liga 2 | 19 | 0 | 0 | 0 | – | | 0 | 0 | 19 | 0 |
| PS Mojokerto Putra | Total | | 37 | 0 | 0 | 0 | – | | 0 | 0 | 37 | 0 |
| Borneo | 2019 | Liga 1 | 7 | 0 | 3 | 0 | – | | 0 | 0 | 10 | 0 |
| PSIS Semarang | 2019 | Liga 1 | 15 | 0 | 0 | 0 | – | | 0 | 0 | 15 | 0 |
| PSIS Semarang | 2020 | Liga 1 | 3 | 0 | 0 | 0 | – | | 0 | 0 | 3 | 0 |
| PSIS Semarang | 2021–22 | Liga 1 | 23 | 0 | 0 | 0 | – | | 4 (Note: Appearances in Menpora Cup) | 0 | 27 | 0 |
| PSIS Semarang | Total | | 41 | 0 | 3 | 0 | – | | 4 | 0 | 48 | 0 |
| Bhayangkara | 2022–23 | Liga 1 | 4 | 0 | 0 | 0 | – | | 3 (Note: Appearances in Indonesia President's Cup) | 0 | 7 | 0 |
| RANS Nusantara | 2022–23 | Liga 1 | 11 | 0 | 0 | 0 | – | | 0 | 0 | 11 | 0 |
| Malut United | 2023–24 | Liga 2 | 21 | 1 | 0 | 0 | – | | 0 | 0 | 21 | 1 |
| Malut United | 2024–25 | Liga 1 | 2 | 0 | 0 | 0 | – | | 0 | 0 | 2 | 0 |
| Malut United | Total | | 23 | 1 | 0 | 0 | – | | 0 | 0 | 23 | 1 |
| Persela Lamongan | 2024–25 | Liga 2 | 3 | 0 | 0 | 0 | – | | 0 | 0 | 3 | 0 |
| Persipal Palu | 2025–26 | Championship | 7 | 0 | 0 | 0 | – | | 0 | 0 | 7 | 0 |
| Career total | | | 133 | 1 | 3 | 0 | 0 | 0 | 7 | 0 | 144 | 1 |

== Honours ==
Malut United

- Liga 2 third place (play-offs): 2023–24
