= Takuya Matsunaga =

Japanese footballer (born 1990)

Personal information
- Full name: Takuya Matsunaga
- Date of birth: 10 June 1990 (age 36)
- Place of birth: Kameoka, Japan
- Height: 1.74 m (5 ft 9 in)
- Position: Midfielder

Team information
- Current team: Persipura Jayapura
- Number: 8

Youth career
- Fushimi Kogyo HS

Senior career*
Years	Team	Apps	(Gls)
2016–2017	Utenis Utena	16	(0)
2017–2018	Tallinna Kalev	41	(5)
2019	KÍ Klaksvik	6	(0)
2019–2020	Kalteng Putra	17	(2)
2020–2022	Persipura Jayapura	28	(0)
2022–2023	Dordoi Bishkek	13	(1)
2023	Yelimay	24	(0)
2024–2025	PSBS Biak	29	(1)
2025–	Persipura Jayapura	16	(0)
2026	→ Deltras (loan)	0	(0)
- * Club domestic league appearances and goals as of 23 October 2026

Takuya Matsunaga (松永 拓也, Matsunaga Takuya; born 10 June 1990) is a Japanese professional footballer who plays as a midfielder for Championship club Persipura Jayapura.

== Club career ==
=== Klaksvíkar Ítróttarfelag ===
Matsunaga made his Faroe Islands Premier League debut against Víkingur as his team drew 2-2. His team went on to win the 2019 Faroe Islands Premier League.

=== Kalteng Putra ===
In 2019, Matsunaga signed for Kalteng Putra. He made his Liga 1 debut against Persebaya as his team drew 1-1. He scored his first goal for Kalteng scoring a long range goal against PSM Makassar as his team won 3-1.

=== Persipura Jayapura ===
In 2020, Matsunaga signed for Persipura. He made his debut for Persipura against PSIS Semarang as his team won 2-0.

=== Dordoi Bishkek ===
On 29 July 2022, Dordoi Bishkek announced the signing of Matsunaga on a contract until the end of the year.

== Career statistics ==
=== Club ===
As of 23 October 2026.

Club	Season	League			Cup		Other		Total	
Club	Season	Division	Apps	Goals	Apps	Goals	Apps	Goals	Apps	Goals
Utenis Utena	2016	I Lyga	5	0	0	0	0	0	5	0
Utenis Utena	2017	I Lyga	11	0	0	0	0	0	11	0
Utenis Utena	Total		16	0	0	0	0	0	16	0
Tallinna Kalev	2017	Esiliiga	6	1	0	0	0	0	6	1
Tallinna Kalev	2018	Meistriliiga	35	4	1 (Note: Appearances in the Estonian Cup)	0	0	0	36	4
Tallinna Kalev	Total		41	5	1	0	0	0	42	5
KÍ Klaksvik	2019	Betri deildin menn	6	0	0	0	0	0	6	0
Kalteng Putra	2019	Liga 1	17	2	0	0	0	0	17	2
Persipura Jayapura	2020	Liga 1	3	0	0	0	0	0	3	0
Persipura Jayapura	2021	Liga 1	25	0	0	0	0	0	25	0
Persipura Jayapura	Total		28	0	0	0	0	0	28	0
Dordoi Bishkek	2022	Kyrgyz Premier League	13	1	0	0	0	0	13	1
Yelimay	2023	Kazakhstan First League	24	0	0	0	0	0	24	0
PSBS Biak	2024–25	Liga 1	29	1	0	0	0	0	29	1
Persipura Jayapura	2025–26	Championship	15	0	0	0	0	0	15	0
Persipura Jayapura	2026–27	Championship	1	0	0	0	0	0	1	0
Deltras (loan)	2026–27	Championship	0	0	0	0	0	0	0	0
Career total			190	8	1	0	0	0	191	8

== Honours ==
Klaksvíkar Ítróttarfelag

- Betri deildin menn : 2019
