= Vanderlei (footballer, born 1987) =

Brazilian footballer

Personal information
- Full name: Vanderlei Francisco
- Date of birth: 25 September 1987 (age 39)
- Place of birth: Valença, Brazil
- Height: 1.82 m (6 ft 0 in)
- Position: Forward

Senior career*
Years	Team	Apps	(Gls)
2009	Itaboraí Profute		
2010	Ivinhema		
2011	Paulista	12	(1)
2011	Santo André	8	(3)
2012	Caxias do Sul	18	(5)
2012	Atlético Goianiense	8	(0)
2012	→ Joinville (loan)	3	(0)
2013	→ ABC (loan)	8	(2)
2014	Mogi Mirim	4	(0)
2014	Daejeon Citizen	23	(7)
2015	Caxias do Sul	8	(2)
2015	São Caetano	2	(0)
2016	Gloria		
2016–2017	Ríver	29	(12)
2017	Ubon UMT	0	(0)
2017	→ Botafogo (loan)	2	(0)
2017–2018	Kazma	14	(16)
2018–2019	Ferroviário		
2019–2020	Semen Padang	16	(8)
2020	Persiraja Banda Aceh	3	(0)
2021	Lagarto	8	(0)
2021	Manchester Futebol		
2022	Fluminense-Pl	1	(0)
- * Club domestic league appearances and goals as of 1 September 2023

Vanderlei Francisco (born 25 September 1987) is a Brazilian professional footballer who plays as a forward who lastly played for Lagarto.

== Club career ==
=== Semen Padang ===
In 2019, Vanderlei signed a contract with Indonesian Liga 1 club Semen Padang. He made 16 league appearances and scored 8 goals for Semen Padang.

=== Persiraja Banda Aceh ===
He was signed for Persiraja Banda Aceh to play in the Liga 1 in the 2020 season. Vanderlei played in all of the club's three matches in the 2020 Liga 1 season that abruptly stopped due to the COVID-19 pandemic.
