= Thiago Amaral =

Brazilian footballer

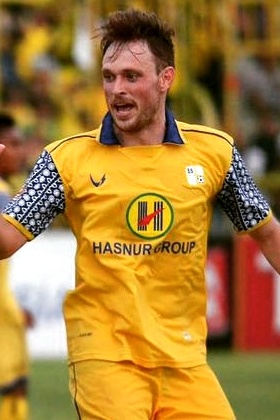
- Amaral playing for Barito Putera in 2016

Personal information
- Full name: Thiago Eduardo do Amaral
- Date of birth: 25 January 1992 (age 34)
- Place of birth: São Bento do Sul, Brazil
- Height: 1.81 m (5 ft 11 in)
- Position: Attacking midfielder

Team information
- Current team: Tripoli
- Number: 22

Youth career
- 2006–2007: Grêmio
- 2007–2008: Figueirense
- 2008–2011: Coritiba
- 2011: Avaí

Senior career*
| Years | Team | Apps | (Gls) |
| 2012 | Avaí | 1 | (0) |
| 2013 | Legião | 4 | (0) |
| 2013 | Juventus-SC | 6 | (2) |
| 2014 | VOCEM | 12 | (4) |
| 2014 | Operário | 0 | (0) |
| 2015 | Sloga Ljubuški | 15 | (9) |
| 2016 | Salalah | 10 | (0) |
| 2016 | Barito Putera | 11 | (1) |
| 2017 | Espirito Santo | 5 | (0) |
| 2017 | Tripoli | 11 | (4) |
| 2017–2018 | Zeravani | 16 | (12) |
| 2018–2019 | Erbil | 10 | (6) |
| 2019 | Bourj | 2 | (1) |
| 2020–2021 | Persipura Jayapura | 3 | (2) |
| 2021–2022 | Sheikh Russel KC | 10 | (0) |
| 2024– | Tripoli | 10 | (3) |
- * Club domestic league appearances and goals as of 14:04, 2 May 2024 (UTC)

Thiago Eduardo do Amaral (born 25 January 1992), commonly known as Thiago Amaral, is a Brazilian professional footballer who plays as an attacking midfielder for Lebanese Premier League club Tripoli.

== Career ==
=== Youth career ===
Born and raised in São Bento do Sul, Brazil, Thiago began his footballing career in 2006 with the U-15 team of Brazilian top side, Grêmio Foot-Ball Porto Alegrense, commonly known as Grêmio. In 2007, he moved to Florianópolis where he signed a long-term contract with Figueirense FC and played there until in 2012 when he moved to Florianópolis's Avaí FC.

=== Brazil ===
Thiago began his professional footballing career in 2012 with Coritiba-based, Corinthians Alagoano club, J. Malucelli Futebol.

In January 2013, he moved to Brasília, the capital of Brazil where he signed a short-term contract with Legião FC club. He made four appearances in the 2013 Campeonato Brasiliense. He then moved to Jaraguá do Sul where he signed a short-term contract with Grêmio Esportivo Juventus club. He scored two goals in six appearances in the 2013 Copa Santa Catarina.

In 2014, he moved to São Paulo where he signed a short-term contract with VOCEM club. He scored 4 goals in 12 appearances in the 2014 Campeonato Paulista Segunda Divisão. Later in the same year, he moved to Várzea Grande, Mato Grosso where he trained with the first team of Operário Futebol Clube.

=== Bosnia and Herzegovina ===
He first moved out of Brazil in 2015 to Europe and more accurately to Bosnia and Herzegovina where he signed a one-year contract with NK Sloga Ljubuški club. He scored 9 goals in 15 appearances in the 2015 Druga Druga Liga

=== Oman ===
On 17 January 2016, he signed a one-year contract with Oman Professional League side, Salalah SC on a six-month contract. He made his Oman Professional League debut on 22 January 2016 in a 1–1 draw against 2014–15 Sultan Qaboos Cup runners-up, Sur SC.

=== Indonesia ===
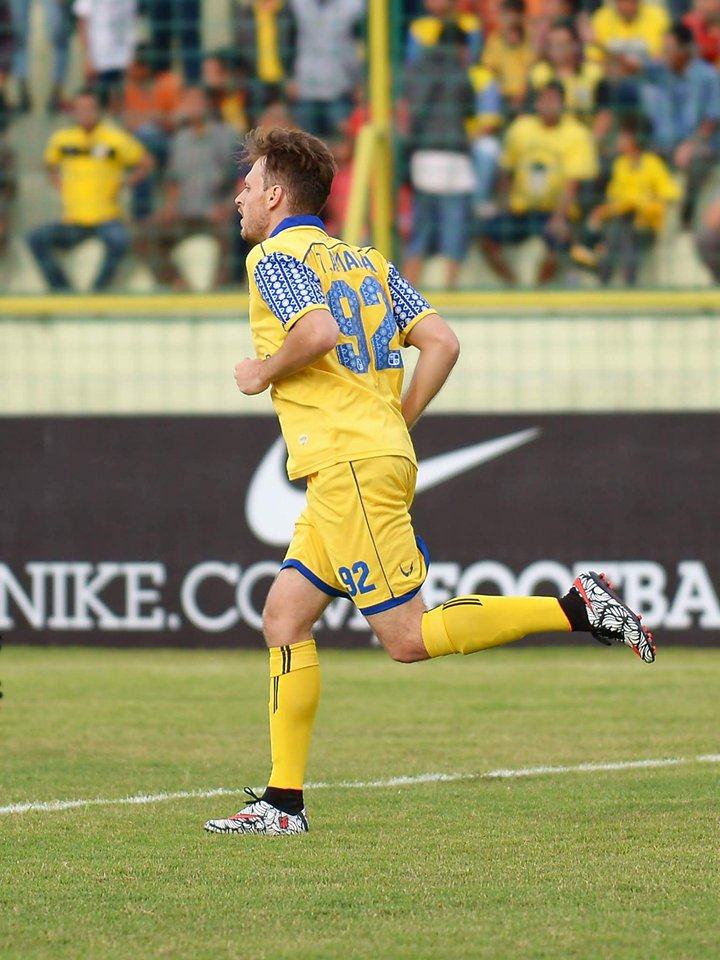
Thiago Amaral - PS Barito Putera 2016

In September 2016, he left for Indonesia and signed a one-year contract for Indonesia Soccer Championship A side, PS Barito Putera.

=== Lebanon ===
He moved to Lebanon in September 2017 where on 7 September he signed a one-year contract with Lebanese Premier League side Tripoli SC. He made his Lebanese Premier League debut and scored his first goal in the competition on 17 September 2017 in a 5–1 loss against Al-Ansar SC.

=== Kurdistan ===
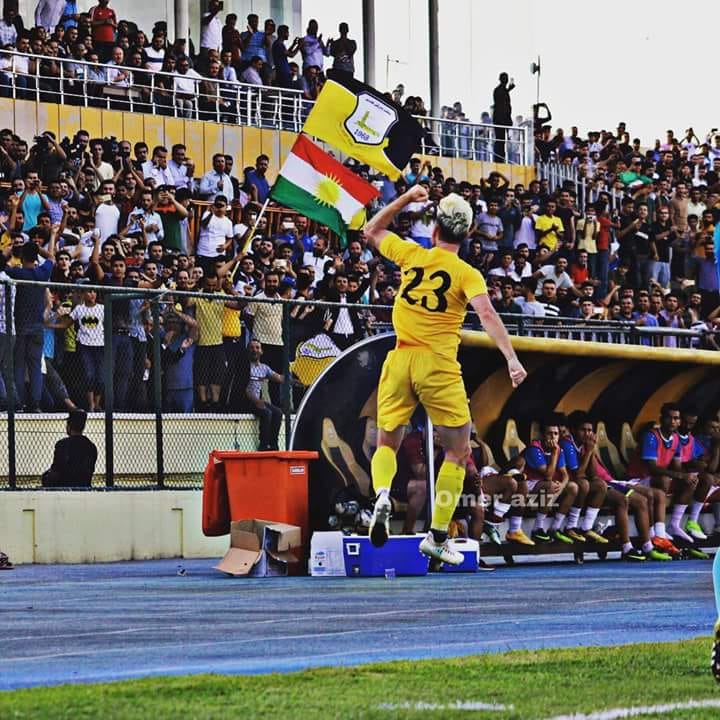
Thiago Amaral - Erbil SC

In January 2018, he received a good proposal to play in the Kurdistan Premier League representing Zeravani SC. He made an impact, helping the team raise the champion's cup and being the league's top scorer, scoring 10 goals in 10 official games.

Soon after finishing the league season, he joined Erbil SC and made history, raising the team to the elite of Iraqi football, also winning the golden ball of the Kurdistan Premier League.

=== Return to Lebanon ===
Amaral returned to Lebanon in 2019, signing for newly promoted side Bourj FC.

=== Return to Indonesia ===
Since the last time in Indonesia in 2016, Amaral returned to Indonesia in 2020, On 21 January, he signed a year contract with Indonesian Liga 1 side Persipura Jayapura.
