= Gabriel do Carmo =

Brazilian footballer (born 1990)

Personal information
- Date of birth: 12 April 1990 (age 36)
- Place of birth: Guarulhos, Brazil
- Height: 1.88 m (6 ft 2 in)
- Position: Forward

Senior career*
Years	Team	Apps	(Gls)
2011	Coritiba	0	(0)
2012	Vila Nova	0	(0)
2012–2013	Asteras Tripolis	7	(0)
2013	Lokomotiv Plovdiv	8	(1)
2014	Ferroviária	0	(0)
2014–2016	Panachaiki	1	(0)
2016	Partizani Tirana	1	(0)
2016	Flamengo SP	0	(0)
2017	Bangu	0	(0)
2017–2018	Sozopol	13	(0)
2020	Akritas Chloraka	7	(1)
2020–2021	Ulaanbaatar City	22	(17)
2021–2022	Persela Lamongan	2	(0)
2022–2023	Persiraja Banda Aceh	0	(0)
2023	Ranong United	4	(1)
2023	Ulaanbaatar City	0	(0)
- * Club domestic league appearances and goals as of 28 January 2023

Gabriel do Carmo (born 12 April 1990) is a Brazilian professional footballer who plays as a forward.

== Career ==
In June 2017, do Carmo signed with Bulgarian Second League side Sozopol. He left the club at the end of the 2017–18 season. On 4 April 2019, de Carmo joined Ulaanbaatar City in Mongolia.

== Honours ==
Ulaanbaatar City

- Mongolian Premier League: 2019
