= Bagus Nirwanto =

Indonesian footballer

Personal information
- Full name: Mohammad Bagus Nirwanto
- Date of birth: 3 May 1993 (age 33)
- Place of birth: Sidoarjo, Indonesia
- Height: 1.65 m (5 ft 5 in)
- Position: Right-back

Team information
- Current team: Deltras
- Number: 3

Youth career
- 2012–2013: Deltras
- 2013: Gresik United

Senior career*
Years	Team	Apps	(Gls)
2014	Deltras	10	(0)
2015	Borneo	0	(0)
2016	PSCS Cilacap	20	(0)
2017–2023	PSS Sleman	125	(1)
2023–2025	Malut United	23	(0)
2025–2026	Garudayaksa	22	(0)
2026–	Deltras	1	(0)
- * Club domestic league appearances and goals as of 13 September 2026

Mohammad Bagus Nirwanto (born 3 May 1993) is an Indonesian professional footballer who plays as a right-back for Championship club Deltras.

== Honours ==
PSCS Cilacap

- Indonesia Soccer Championship B: 2016

PSS Sleman

- Liga 2: 2018
- Menpora Cup third place: 2021

Malut United

- Liga 2 third place (play-offs): 2023–24

Garudayaksa

- Championship: 2025–26
