= Robert Alberts =

Dutch footballer and manager

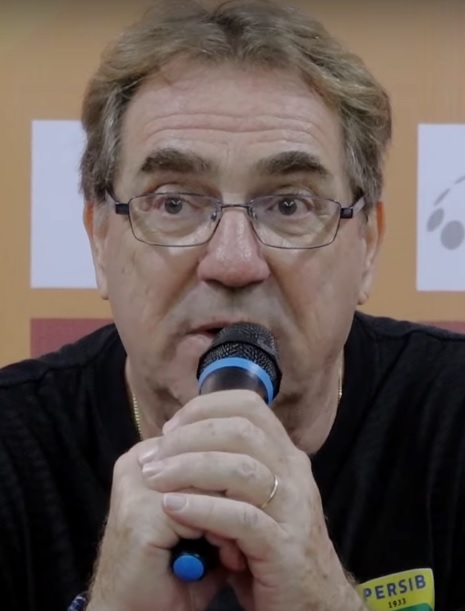
- Alberts in 2019

Personal information
- Full name: Robert René Alberts
- Date of birth: 14 November 1954 (age 71)
- Place of birth: Amsterdam, Netherlands
- Position: Midfielder

Youth career
- 1966–1976: Ajax

Senior career*
Years	Team	Apps	(Gls)
1975	→ Vancouver Whitecaps	9	(2)
1976	Clermont Foot		
1976	Vancouver Whitecaps	9	(1)
1977	Råå IF		
1978–1983	Hittarps IK		

Managerial career
- 1984–1987: Hittarps IK
- 1988–1991: Astorps IK
- 1992–1995: Kedah FA
- 1996–1998: Tanjong Pagar United
- 1998–2001: Home United
- 2002–2004: South Korea (Head of Academy Coaching)
- 2008–2009: Sarawak FA
- 2009–2010: Arema Indonesia
- 2010: PSM Makassar
- 2011–2015: Sarawak FA
- 2016–2019: PSM Makassar
- 2019–2022: Persib Bandung
- * Club domestic league appearances and goals

Robert René Alberts (born 14 November 1954) is a Dutch professional football coach and former player.

== Playing career ==
Alberts played for Ajax's third team and had stints at French outfit Clermont Foot and in the NASL with Vancouver Whitecaps. He finished his career in the Swedish league.

== Managerial career ==
Alberts started his coaching career in Sweden, then moved to Malaysia where he won the league and Malaysia Cup titles with Kedah FA in 1993. He also has coached in Singapore with Tanjong Pagar United and Home United, winning the Singapore Premier League title with Home United in 1999. Later he coached the U-19 teams of South Korea.

He managed the Indonesian champion Arema Indonesia in 2009–10. In doing so, he became the first foreign manager to win the Indonesian top-tier title in his first season.

Alberts took over as manager and head coach of Sarawak FA for the second time in 2011. He had managed the team before in 2008–2009 before going to Indonesia. He held the post until his contract with Sarawak was mutually terminated in 2015, due to poor performances of the team in 2015 Malaysia Super League. During his stay in Sarawak, the team won the Premier League in 2013 and were runners-up in 2011, on both times winning promotion to the Super League. Sarawak also reached the semi-finals of Malaysia Cup in 2013 with Alberts at the helm.

In June 2016, he came back to PSM Makassar after his left on 2011. On 2018 Liga 1, he managed the team to finish on the second place in the final table.

Alberts left PSM due to his health condition, however, he signed contract for Persib Bandung prior to 2019 Liga 1 after Persib sacked Miljan Radović. It made many PSM fans disappointed. He led Persib to reach runner-up on 2021–22 Liga 1. On 10 August 2022, following the pressure by Bobotoh, Persib fans, the club announced his resignation.

== Managerial honours ==
=== Club ===
Kedah FA

- Malaysia Premier One League: 1993
- Malaysia Cup: 1993

Home United

- S.League: 1999
- Singapore Cup: 2000, 2001

Arema Indonesia

- Indonesia Super League: 2009–10
- Piala Indonesia: runners-up 2010

Sarawak FA

- Malaysia Premier League: 2013; runners-up: 2011. PSM Makassar :
- Liga 1 : Peringkat 3 2017
- Liga 1 : Runner Up 2018. Persib Bandung :
- BRI Liga 1 : Runner up 2021/2022
