= Dragan Đukanović =

Serbian footballer (born 1969)

Personal information
- Date of birth: 29 October 1969 (age 57)
- Place of birth: Nikšić, SR Montenegro, Yugoslavia
- Height: 1.90 m (6 ft 3 in)
- Position: Forward

Team information
- Current team: Maziya (head coach)

Senior career*
Years	Team	Apps	(Gls)
1990–1992	OFK Beograd	48	(16)
1992–1995	OFI	65	(24)
1995–1996	Omonia	18	(8)
1997–1998	Örebro	14	(3)
1998	Avispa Fukuoka	20	(1)
1999–2000	Mogren	34	(17)
2000–2001	Racing Paris	20	(11)
2001–2002	Istres	14	(1)
2002–2003	Ethnikos Asteras	7	(0)
2003–2004	Mogren	28	(5)

International career
- Yugoslavia U21

Managerial career
- 2013: Sinđelić Beograd
- 2014–2015: Sheikh Russel
- 2015–2016: Lovćen
- 2016–2017: Borneo Samarinda
- 2019: Sinđelić Beograd
- 2019: PSIS Semarang (Technical Director)
- 2020–2021: PSIS Semarang
- 2021: Karaiskakis
- 2022: PSIS Semarang
- 2023: Egaleo
- 2024–: Maziya
- * Club domestic league appearances and goals

Dragan Đukanović (Serbian Cyrillic: Драган Ђукановић; born 29 October 1969) is a Serbian professional football manager for Dhivehi Premier League club Maziya and former player.

== Club career ==
Born in Nikšić, Montenegro, Yugoslavia, Đukanović began his senior career with OFK Beograd. He later played for OFI Crete, Omonia, Örebro, Avispa Fukuoka, Mogren, Racing Paris, Istres and Ethnikos Asteras.

== International career ==
Đukanović represented Yugoslavia at under-21 level, making 13 appearances and scoring no goals.
