= Fary Komul =

Indonesian footballer

Personal information
- Full name: Fary Komul
- Date of birth: 1 March 1987 (age 39)
- Place of birth: Lhokseumawe, Indonesia
- Height: 1.79 m (5 ft 10 in)
- Position: Central midfielder

Youth career
- PSLS Lhokseumawe

Senior career*
Years	Team	Apps	(Gls)
2008–2009	PSLS Lhokseumawe	0	(0)
2009–2012	PSAP Sigli	58	(5)
2013–2016	Persija Jakarta	23	(0)
2017	Persiraja Banda Aceh	12	(3)
2018	Aceh United	16	(3)
2019–2021	Persiraja Banda Aceh	26	(2)
2021–2022	Persis Solo	3	(0)
- * Club domestic league appearances and goals as of 29 November 2021

Fary Komul (born 1 March 1987) is an Indonesian professional footballer who plays as a central midfielder. Previously he played for Aceh United and Persija Jakarta.

== Honours ==
=== Club ===
Persiraja Banda Aceh

- Liga 2 third place (play-offs): 2019

Persis Solo

- Liga 2: 2021
