= Derry Rachman =

Indonesian footballer

Personal information
- Full name: Derry Rachman Noor
- Date of birth: 15 December 1994 (age 31)
- Place of birth: Bontang, Indonesia
- Height: 1.69 m (5 ft 7 in)
- Position: Left back

Team information
- Current team: Bekasi City
- Number: 69

Youth career
- PON Kalimantan Timur
- 2016–2017: Bontang

Senior career*
Years	Team	Apps	(Gls)
2017	Kalteng Putra	2	(0)
2017	Perssu Sumenep	4	(0)
2018	PS Mojokerto Putra	25	(1)
2019–2023	PSS Sleman	65	(0)
2023–2024	PSMS Medan	8	(0)
2024	PSKC Cimahi	0	(0)
2024–2025	Persibo Bojonegoro	9	(0)
2025–	Bekasi City	8	(0)
- * Club domestic league appearances and goals as of 16 February 2026

Derry Rachman Noor (born 15 December 1994) is an Indonesian professional footballer who last played as a left back for Championship club Bekasi City.

== Club career ==
=== PS Mojokerto Putra ===
In 2018, Derry Rachman signed a one-year contract with Indonesian Liga 2 club PS Mojokerto Putra. He made 25 league appearances for PS Mojokerto Putra.

=== PSS Sleman ===
He was signed for PSS Sleman to play in Liga 1 in the 2019 season. Derry made his league debut on 31 May 2019 in a match against Persipura Jayapura at the Mandala Stadium, Jayapura.

== Honours ==
=== Club ===
PSS Sleman

- Menpora Cup third place: 2021
