= Diogo Campos =

Brazilian footballer (born 1990)

Personal information
- Full name: Diogo Campos Gomes
- Date of birth: 31 December 1990 (age 35)
- Place of birth: Miranorte, Brazil
- Height: 1.74 m (5 ft 9 in)
- Position: Attacking midfielder

Youth career
- 2009–2010: Atlético Goianiense

Senior career*
Years	Team	Apps	(Gls)
2011–2015	Atlético Goianiense	77	(10)
2013	→ Thonon Evian (loan)	1	(0)
2013	→ Thonon Evian II (loan)	10	(8)
2015	→ Botafogo (loan)	8	(2)
2015	Santa Cruz	5	(0)
2016–2017	Botafogo	28	(6)
2017	Botafogo SP	2	(0)
2017	Água Santa	11	(2)
2018	Botev Plovdiv	25	(3)
2019	Kalteng Putra	14	(3)
2019	Persebaya Surabaya	14	(7)
2020–2021	Borneo	3	(0)
2021	Negeri Sembilan	0	(0)
Total		198	(41)
- * Club domestic league appearances and goals

Diogo Campos Gomes (born 31 December 1990) is a Brazilian former professional footballer who plays as an attacking midfielder.

== Career ==
On 31 January 2013, Campos signed at Thonon Evian as a loan deal. He will wear a shirt with "Diogo Gomes" on his back, although his nickname is "Diogo Campos".

On 8 January 2018, Campos signed a contract with Botev Plovdiv. He made an unofficial debut on 19 January and scored twice in a friendly game against Maritsa Plovdiv.

Campos scored his first goal in an official game for Botev Plovdiv on 27 February during a 3–1 home defeat from Ludogorets Razgrad. On 12 March, on the day when Botev Plovdiv celebrated 106 years from its foundation, Campos scored a goal in 4–2 away win over Vereya. On 21 April Campos scored a goal during a 4–2 defeat from Ludogorets Razgrad.

== Honours ==
Persebaya Surabaya

- Liga 1 runner-up: 2019

Kalteng Putra

- Piala Presiden Semifinalist: 2019
