= Renan Silva =

Brazilian footballer

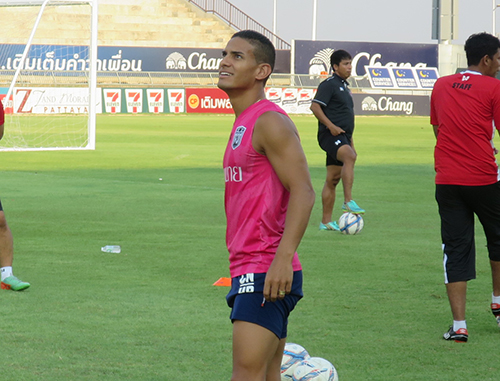
- Renan with Chainat Hornbill in 2016

Personal information
- Full name: Renan da Silva
- Date of birth: 2 January 1989 (age 37)
- Place of birth: Rio de Janeiro, Brazil
- Height: 1.76 m (5 ft 9 in)
- Position: Attacking midfielder

Youth career
- 2000–2010: Flamengo

Senior career*
Years	Team	Apps	(Gls)
2011	Vitória	1	(0)
2011–2012	Olaria	16	(6)
2012	Boavista	4	(1)
2012–2013	Rapid București	3	(0)
2013	Petrolul Ploiești	12	(1)
2013–2014	Al-Nahda	11	(3)
2014	Macaé	4	(0)
2014–2015	Songkhla United	12	(4)
2015	Dibba Al Fujairah	11	(5)
2015–2016	Siah Jamegan	7	(0)
2016	Chainat Hornbill	17	(2)
2016–2017	Nova Iguaçu	14	(2)
2017	Al-Shamal	8	(3)
2017–2018	Al-Jahra	12	(2)
2018	Persija Jakarta	13	(0)
2019	Borneo Samarinda	30	(12)
2020–2021	Bhayangkara	15	(4)
2022	Madura United	12	(4)
2022–2024	Persik Kediri	62	(14)
2024–2025	Gresik United	21	(6)
2025–2026	Bekasi City	24	(4)
- * Club domestic league appearances and goals as of 2 May 2026

Renan da Silva (born 2 January 1989) is a Brazilian professional footballer who plays as an attacking midfielder.

== Honours ==
=== Clubs ===
A.C Olaria

- Cup Washington Rodrigues: 2011

Petrolul Ploieşti

- Romanian Cup: 2013

Dibba Al Fujairah

- UAE Division 1: 2015

Chainat Hornbill

- Thai FA Cup: 2016

Nova Iguaçu F.C

- Cup Extra Championship Carioca: 2017

Persija Jakarta

- Liga 1: 2018

=== Individual ===
- Liga 1 Best Player: 2019
- Liga 1 Team of the Season: 2019
- Liga 1 Player of the Month: March 2023
