= Javlon Guseynov =

Uzbekistan Association football player

Personal information
- Full name: Javlon Guseynov
- Date of birth: 24 June 1991 (age 35)
- Place of birth: Akkurgan, Uzbekistan
- Height: 1.85 m (6 ft 1 in)
- Position: Centre-back

Team information
- Current team: Persita Tangerang
- Number: 19

Senior career*
Years	Team	Apps	(Gls)
2012–2015	Neftchi Fergana	0	(0)
2015–2017	Andijon	43	(0)
2017	Sogdiana Jizzakh	13	(0)
2018	AGMK	22	(0)
2019–2023	Borneo Samarinda	74	(3)
2023–	Persita Tangerang	110	(6)
- * Club domestic league appearances and goals as of 31 October 2026

Javlon Guseynov (Russian: Гусейнов Джавлан; born 24 June 1991) is an Uzbekistani professional footballer who plays as a centre-back for Super League club Persita Tangerang.

== Club career ==
=== Borneo ===
On 6 January 2019, Guseynov officially signed a year contract with Borneo Samarinda. He extended the contract with Borneo on 5 January 2020.

== Honours ==
AGMK

- Uzbekistan Cup: 2018

Borneo Samarinda

- Piala Presiden runner-up: 2022

Individual

- Liga 1 Team of the Season: 2019
