= Gaspar Vega (footballer) =

Argentine footballer

Personal information
- Full name: Gaspar Ignacio Vega
- Date of birth: 19 June 1992 (age 34)
- Place of birth: Córdoba, Argentina
- Height: 1.82 m (6 ft 0 in)
- Position: Midfielder

Team information
- Current team: Racing

Youth career
- Belgrano

Senior career*
Years	Team	Apps	(Gls)
2013–2014	Alumni	15	(1)
2015–2016	Las Palmas	29	(2)
2016–2017	Italiano	47	(4)
2017–2018	Atlanta	24	(1)
2019	Rampla Juniors	22	(0)
2020	Persik Kediri	3	(1)
2021	Temperley	23	(1)
2022	Mushuc Runa	7	(0)
2022	Mitre	0	(0)
2023–2024	Nueva Chicago	40	(0)
2025	General Caballero JLM	31	(1)
2026–	Racing	0	(0)
- * Club domestic league appearances and goals as of 00:50, 19 March 2026 (UTC)

Gaspar Ignacio Vega (born 19 June 1992) is an Argentine professional footballer who plays as a midfielder for Primera Nacional club Racing.
