= Wiljan Pluim =

Dutch footballer (born 1989)

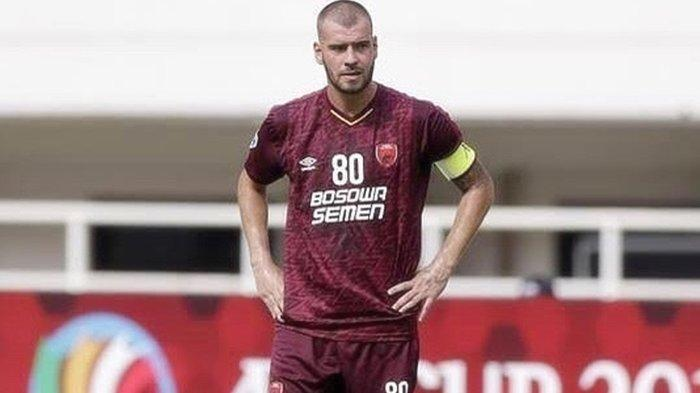
- Wiljan Pluim while still at PSM Makassar

Personal information
- Full name: Willem Jan Pluim
- Date of birth: 4 January 1989 (age 37)
- Place of birth: Zwolle, Netherlands
- Height: 1.91 m (6 ft 3 in)
- Position: Attacking midfielder

Team information
- Current team: SV Epe

Youth career
- VV Elspeet
- Vitesse/AGOVV

Senior career*
Years	Team	Apps	(Gls)
2008–2011	Vitesse	36	(5)
2011	→ Roda JC (loan)	14	(0)
2011–2015	Roda JC	59	(5)
2012–2013	→ Zwolle (loan)	34	(1)
2015	Willem II	8	(0)
2015–2016	Becamex Binh Duong	0	(0)
2016–2023	PSM Makassar	151	(41)
2023–2024	Borneo Samarinda	14	(5)
2024–	SV Epe	0	(0)
- * Club domestic league appearances and goals as of 30 May 2024

Willem Jan Pluim (born 4 January 1989), commonly known as Wiljan Pluim, is a Dutch professional footballer who played as an attacking midfielder for Derde Klasse club SV Epe.

== Career ==
=== Vitesse ===
In 2008, Pluim broke through to the senior team of Vitesse after progressing through the youth academy.

==== Roda JC (loan) ====
After making 36 appearances for the first team, the club sent him on a six-month loan in January 2011 to Roda JC, who secured an option to buy.

=== Roda JC ===
The club triggered the option on 1 July 2011, signing him to a three-year contract.

==== Zwolle (loan) ====
Pluim was sent on a season-long loan to Zwolle for the 2012–13 season. After returning to Roda JC, he suffered relegation to the Eerste Divisie with the team in May 2014. On 2 February 2015, Pluim's contract with Roda JC was terminated by mutual agreement.

=== Willem II ===
Pluim signed a one-and-a-half-year contract with Willem II on 4 February 2015. He made his debut ten days later as a 60th minute substitute for Robert Braber, in a competition match against Vitesse, which ended in a 2–0 loss. Pluim made eight appearances for Willem II for the remainder of the season, but did not appear in the plans of then head coach Jurgen Streppel in the following season. The club subsequently terminated his contract on 31 August 2015.

=== Becamex Binh Duong ===
In December 2015, Pluim signed a one-year contract with Becamex Binh Duong in Vietnam. Without him making an appearance, the club won the Vietnamese National Football Super Cup. On 23 February 2016, it was announced that Pluim had left the club without having made a single appearance.

=== PSM Makassar ===
In August 2016, he started playing for Indonesian club PSM Makassar. Pluim helped the club win the 2018–19 Piala Indonesia for the first time and the 2022–23 Liga 1.

On 8 August 2023, Bosowa founder Sadikin Aksa asked the management and coaches of PSM Makassar to drop mainstay midfielder Pluim from the PSM Makassar squad. Bosowa is PSM's main sponsor and largest shareholder. The reason Pluim was dropped, according to Sadikin Aksa, was because of the age factor that affected the performance of the Dutch player, which resulted in his movements to be considered slow.

=== Borneo Samarinda ===
On 12 November 2023, Pluim made his debut for Borneo Samarinda against Bali United in a 2–1 win. On 10 December 2023, Pluim scored his first goal for Borneo Samarinda against PSIS Semarang in a 2–0 win.

=== SV Epe ===
Pluim canceled his retirement after leaving Borneo Samarinda. The 35 year old midfielder returned to his career in the Netherlands. Pluim has officially joined SV Epe, an amateur club competing in the eighth caste of the Dutch League, aka Derde Klasse, for the 2024/2025 season.

== Honours ==
PSM Makassar

- Liga 1: 2022–23
- Piala Indonesia: 2018–19

Individual

- Liga 1 Team of the Season: 2017, 2018, 2022–23
- Liga 1 Player of the Month: February 2023
- Liga 1 Best Player: 2022–23
