= Wallace Costa =

Brazilian footballer

Personal information
- Full name: Wallace Costa Alves
- Date of birth: 13 August 1986 (age 40)
- Place of birth: Rio de Janeiro, Brazil
- Height: 1.86 m (6 ft 1 in)
- Position: Centre-back

Senior career*
Years	Team	Apps	(Gls)
2008–2009	Friburguense	11	(0)
2009	Brasil de Pelotas	1	(0)
2009–2010	Friburguense	16	(2)
2014–2015	Kazma		
2015–2018	Al-Sulaibikhat		
2018–2019	Persela Lamongan	30	(4)
2019–2022	PSIS Semarang	63	(13)
- * Club domestic league appearances and goals as of 24 March 2022

Wallace Costa Alves (born 13 August 1986) is a Brazilian professional footballer who plays as a centre-back.

== Honours ==
=== Individual ===
- Indonesian Soccer Awards: Best 11 2019
