= Rafinha (footballer, born 1990) =

Brazilian footballer

Rafael Gomes
Personal information
- Full name: Rafael Gomes de Oliveira
- Date of birth: 26 April 1990 (age 36)
- Place of birth: São Paulo, Brazil
- Height: 1.78 m (5 ft 10 in)
- Position: Winger

Youth career
- 2002–2010: São Paulo

Senior career*
Years	Team	Apps	(Gls)
2011	Red Bull Brasil		
2012–2014	São Paulo	4	(0)
2012	→ Guarani (loan)	7	(0)
2013	→ Ceará (loan)	1	(0)
2014	→ América RN (loan)	1	(0)
2014–2015	Portimonense	31	(1)
2016	Operário Ferroviário		
2016–2017	Cafetaleros de Tapachula	7	(0)
2017	→ Herediano (loan)	14	(0)
2018	Brusque		
2018–2019	Operário Ferroviário	4	(0)
2019–2020	Persela Lamongan	36	(11)
2020–2021	Ermis Aradippou	8	(1)
2021	Negeri Sembilan	10	(1)
2021	Barito Putera	15	(4)
2022	Barito Putera	6	(1)
- * Club domestic league appearances and goals as of 6 December 2022

Rafael Gomes de Oliveira (born 26 April 1990), known as Rafinha, is a Brazilian professional footballer who plays as a winger.

== Career ==
Rafinha gained prominence playing with São Paulo FC in the 2012 Campeonato Paulista, being the young talent bet of then coach Émerson Leão. He also had notable spells with Brusque and Operário Ferroviário.

== Honours ==
=== Club ===
Operário Ferroviário

- Campeonato Brasileiro Série C: 2018
