= Edson Tavares =

Brazilian football manager (born 1956)

Personal information
- Full name: Edson Araujo Tavares
- Date of birth: 10 June 1956 (age 70)
- Place of birth: Rio de Janeiro, Brazil

Managerial career
- Years: Team
- 1982–1983: FC Fribourg
- 1984–1985: Stade Soussien FC
- 1986–1987: Jordan
- 1988–1989: Signal Bernex
- 1989: Chile (assistant coach)
- 1990–1991: Al-Hilal
- 1991–1993: Al-Salmiya
- 1994–1995: Vietnam
- 1996–1997: Khaitan
- 1998: Guangzhou Matsunichi
- 1999: Sichuan Quanxing
- 2000: Shenzhen Pingan
- 2001–2003: Chongqing Lifan
- 2004: Vietnam
- 2005: Americano (technical director)
- 2005–2006: Sepahan
- 2007: Americano (technical director)
- 2008: Oman (Olympic team)
- 2009: Shenzhen
- 2010–2011: Haiti
- 2017–2019: Yokohama
- 2019: Persija
- 2020: Borneo
- 2022–2023: Sanat Naft

Edson Araujo Tavares (born 10 June 1956 in Rio de Janeiro) is a Brazilian football manager who is currently in charge of Sanat Naft.
