= Francisco Torres (Brazilian footballer) =

Brazilian footballer (born 1989)

Personal information
- Full name: Francisco Wagsley Rodrigues de Sousa Filho
- Date of birth: 3 September 1989 (age 37)
- Place of birth: Baturité, Brazil
- Height: 1.83 m (6 ft 0 in)
- Position: Forward

Youth career
- São Luiz

Senior career*
Years	Team	Apps	(Gls)
2009–2010	São Luiz		
2010–2011	Kuusankoski	22	(6)
2011	MYPA	1	(0)
2012	Mikkelin Palloilijat	26	(12)
2013	Horizonte	12	(3)
2013–2014	Mikkelin Palloilijat	40	(33)
2015	Ceahlăul Piatra Neamț	7	(1)
2015	GAIS	9	(3)
2016–2017	Al-Wehdat	23	(11)
2017–2018	Al-Jahra	8	(3)
2018	Al-Nasr	7	(9)
2018	Al Urooba	0	(0)
2019	Treze	0	(0)
2019	Badak Lampung	12	(4)
2019	Barito Putera	15	(8)
2020	Borneo	3	(2)
2020	Dhaka Abahani	12	(7)
2021–2022	Borneo	29	(15)
2022–2023	Al-Nasr	0	(0)
2023	PEPO	19	(8)

Managerial career
- 2025–: Barito Putera (Assistant)
- * Club domestic league appearances and goals as of 7 October 2023

Francisco Wagsley Rodrigues de Sousa Filho (born 3 September 1989), commonly known as Francisco Torres, is a Brazilian professional footballer who plays as a forward.

== Career ==
=== Badak Lampung ===
On 4 April 2019, Torres made his first career by arriving in Indonesia after made his career in Campeonato Brasileiro Série D club Treze, then he signed a one-year contract with Indonesian Liga 1 club Badak Lampung. On 21 June 2019, he made his debut by starting in a 1–2 win against Semen Padang. He finally scored his first goal for Badak Lampung in the second half, he scored in the 52nd minute. During his time with the club, he made 12 league appearances and scored four goals.

=== Barito Putera ===
On 4 September 2019, he made his first career by arriving in South Kalimantan, Indonesia after made his career with Badak Lampung, then he signed a one-year contract with Indonesian Liga 1 club Barito Putera. On 14 September 2019, he made his debut by starting in a 2–2 draw against Madura United. And he also scored his first goal for the team, he scored in the 13rd minute from the penalty at the Gelora Bangkalan Stadium.

=== Borneo ===
In 2020, Torres signed a contract with Indonesian Liga 1 club Borneo. He made 3 league appearances and scored 2 goals for Borneo. This season was suspended on 27 March 2020 due to the COVID-19 pandemic. The season was abandoned and was declared void on 20 January 2021.

=== Dhaka Abahani ===
Torres joined Bangladesh Premier League club Dhaka Abahani in November 2020. He made 12 league appearances and scored seven goals for Dhaka Abahani.

=== Return to Borneo ===
On 23 May 2021, it was confirmed that Torres would re-join Borneo, signing a year contract. Torres made his debut on 4 September 2021 in a match against Persebaya Surabaya. On 17 September 2021, Torres scored his first goal for Borneo against Barito Putera in the 83rd minute from the penalty at the Wibawa Mukti Stadium.
