= Bruno Silva (footballer, born April 1991) =

Brazilian footballer

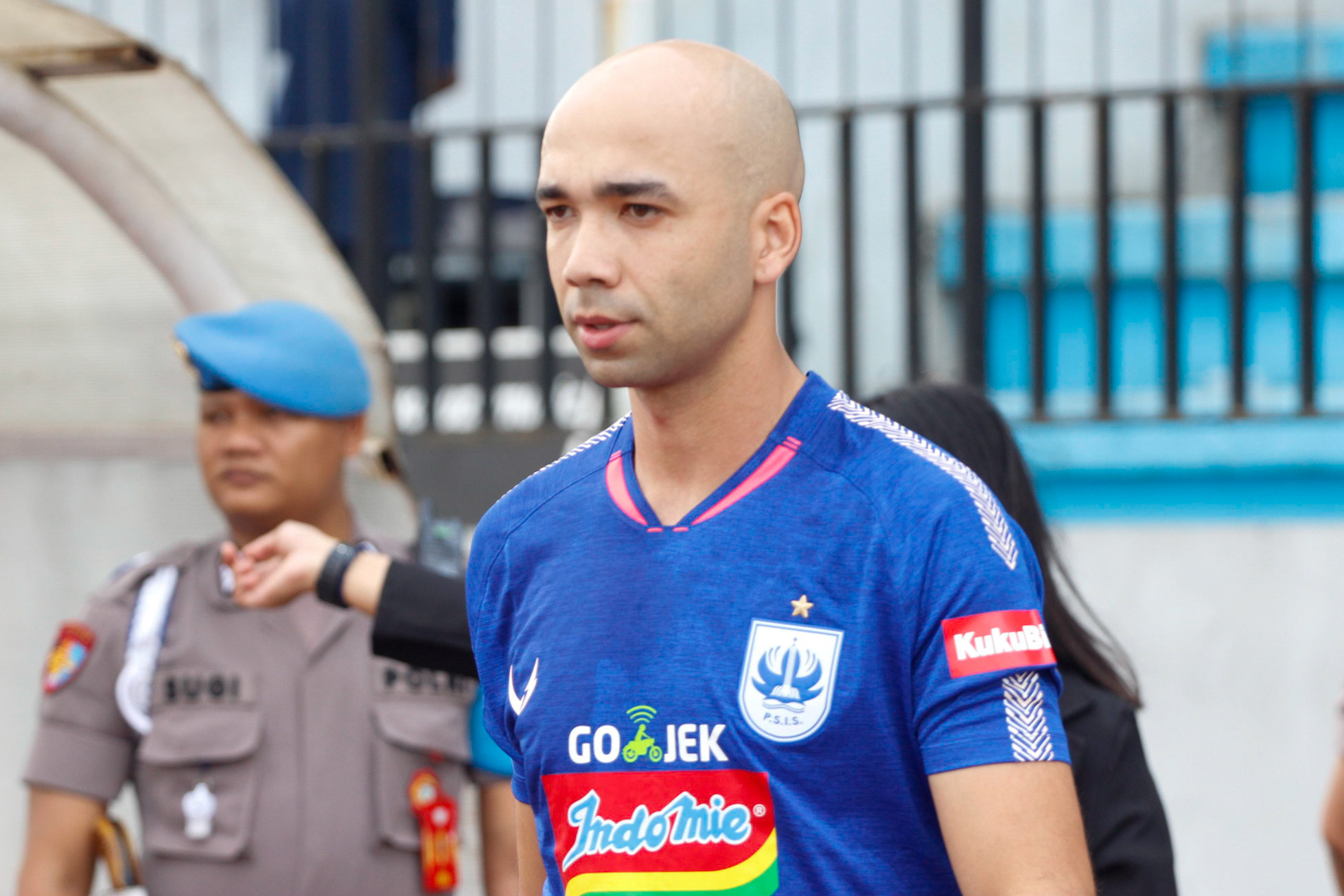
- Bruno with PSIS Semarang in 2019

Personal information
- Full name: Bruno Silva
- Date of birth: 14 April 1991 (age 35)
- Place of birth: Poá, Brazil
- Height: 1.88 m (6 ft 2 in)
- Position: Forward

Senior career*
Years	Team	Apps	(Gls)
2010	União Suzano		
2011	Nacional	13	(4)
2012	Naviraiense		
2013–2014	Nacional	25	(7)
2015–2016	Votuporanguense	34	(9)
2016	Botafogo-SP	2	(0)
2017	Portuguesa	14	(3)
2017	ASA	1	(0)
2018	Manama Club		
2018	PSIS Semarang	31	(16)
2019	Al-Ain		
2019–2022	PSIS Semarang	28	(10)
2022–2023	União Suzano	10	(1)
2023–2024	PSPS Pekanbaru	10	(4)
2024	Royal Pari	7	(0)
- * Club domestic league appearances and goals as of 19 August 2024

Bruno Silva (born 14 April 1991) is a Brazilian professional footballer who plays as a forward.

== Career ==
=== PSIS Semarang ===
In 2018, Silva signed a contract with PSIS Semarang. He made his debut in a 1–4 home lost against Persija Jakarta on 20 April 2018.

=== Al-Ain Saudi ===
He joined Saudi Second Division club Al-Ain in January 2019.

=== Return to PSIS Semarang ===
On 16 September 2019, it was confirmed that Bruno would re-join PSIS Semarang, signing a one-year contract.
