= Earth's Own Food Company =

Canadian food manufacturing company

Earth's Own Food Company Inc.
- Formerly: Soyaworld Inc.
- Industry: Food industry
- Founded: 1997
- Founder: Maheb Nathoo
- Headquarters: Burnaby, Canada
- Area served: Canada, Caribbean, Hong Kong and South Korea
- Key people: Maheb Nathoob, CEO
- Products: Beverages, sour cream, cream cheese and butter spread
- Website: earthsown.com

Earth's Own Food Company Inc. also known just as Earth's Own (previously Soyaworld Inc.) is a vegan food company in Burnaby, Canada. Earth's Own Food Company is Canada's largest soy beverage company.

== History ==
In 1997, Soyaworld Inc. was founded by Maheb Nathoo who held the position of Vice President of Finance at Dairyworld Foods. He took his idea of soy milk products to Dairyworld Foods, which gave him an investment of $250,000 to enter this new market. Nathoo then called Sunrise Markets of his idea, the company agreed to be part of a joint venture and gave him $250,000. In 1997, the sales for Soyaworld were $3 million.

In 2003, Sanitarium So Good Limited purchased 100% control of Soyaworld. In 2004, the sales for Soyaworld were $50 million.

In early 2011, Soyaworld Inc. was renamed Earth's Own Food Company Inc. In 2012, Agrifoods International Cooperative LTD purchased shares of Earth's Own.

In early April 2019, Earth's Own Food Company changed its logo and packaging of its products.

== Products ==
Earth's Own Food Company makes many beverages that are organic, vegan, kosher, non-GMO, peanut free, gluten free and refrigerated. It also makes oat, soy and almond milk and coffee creamers. It also makes sour cream, cream cheese and butter spread.

== See also ==
- List of vegetarian and vegan companies
