= Ante Bakmaz =

Australian soccer player

Personal information
- Full name: Anthony Bakmaz
- Date of birth: 7 March 1992 (age 34)
- Place of birth: Westmead, Australia
- Height: 1.88 m (6 ft 2 in)
- Position: Centre-back

Youth career
- 2011: Granville Rage
- 2012: Fraser Park
- 2013: Fairfield City Lions
- 2014–2015: Chabab
- 2015–2016: Ajax

Senior career*
Years	Team	Apps	(Gls)
2013	Fairfield City Lions	5	(0)
2013	NK Trešnjevka		
2014	NK Laduč		
2016	St. Andrews	8	(0)
2017	FK Jelgava	21	(0)
2018	FK Kauno Žalgiris	13	(0)
2018	Valmieras FK	6	(1)
2019	Nejmeh	0	(0)
2019	Madura United	15	(0)
2020	Persik Kediri	3	(0)
2020	Comuna Recea	9	(2)
2021	Al Suwaiq	0	(0)
2022	Jedinstvo Bihać	9	(3)
2023	Sydney United 58	23	(0)
2024	NWS Spirit FC	25	(2)
- * Club domestic league appearances and goals as of 20 February 2025

Ante Bakmaz (born 7 March 1992) is a former Australian professional footballer who last played as a centre-back for NWS Spirit FC.

== Early life ==
Born in the suburbs of Sydney, Australia, Bakmaz moved to his country of origin, Croatia, after completing his studies in 2013. His brother is well renowned Chess Grandmaster and Age Of Empires 2 High Elo player Mate Bakmaz.

== Club career ==
=== Early career ===
Starting his career in Australia, Bakmaz moved to Croatia in 2013. He played first for NK Trešnjevka, and then for NK Laduč in 2014, before moving to Amsterdam, Netherlands in 2015. He joined Dutch side Chabab, before moving to Ajax. He would, however, only play for the reserve teams.

=== Latvia and Lithuania ===
After the 2015–16 season, which left him injured and without a professional contract, Bakmaz moved to Maltese side St. Andrews in 2016. After six months, in 2017, he signed a one-year contract with Latvian club FK Jelgava. In January 2018, Bakmaz signed for FK Kauno Žalgiris in Lithuania, before moving back to Latvia, signing for Valmieras FK in the same year's summer transfer window.

=== Lebanon and Indonesia ===
In 2019, Bakmaz moved to Lebanese side Nejmeh to compete in the 2019 AFC Cup; he played in six games. On 1 September 2019, he joined Indonesian side Madura United. However, after 15 games in the Liga 1, the club announced that they would not renew his contract. On 9 February 2020, Bakmaz joined Persik Kediri.

=== Oman ===
As of 2021, Bakmaz is playing for Al Suwaiq in the Oman Professional League.

=== Australia ===
In 2023, Bakmaz returned to Australia to play for Sydney United 58 and won the Waratah Cup.

In 2024, Bakmaz joined NWS Spirit FC.

In 2026, Ante joined the Sutherland Sharks as an assistant coach.

== Honours ==
With Sydney United 58:

- (Australia) Waratah Cup Champions: 2023
- (Australia) Australian-Croatian Soccer Tournament Division One Champions: 2023

With NWS Spirit FC:

- (Australia) ANDROCK Cup: 2024

== Personal life ==
Born in Australia, Bakmaz is of Croatian descent. He can speak both English and Croatian.
