= Trier (electoral district) =

Constituency for the German Bundestag

202 Trier
- Electoral district for the Bundestag
- Trier in 2025
- State: Rhineland-Palatinate
- Population: 260,900 (2019)
- Electorate: 187,536 (2025)
- Major settlements: Trier; Konz; Schweich
- Area: 1,219.3 km^{2}

Current electoral district
- Created: 1949
- Member: Vacant
- Elected: 2025

Trier is an electoral constituency (German: Wahlkreis) represented in the Bundestag. It elects one member via first-past-the-post voting. Under the current constituency numbering system, it is designated as constituency 202. It is located in western Rhineland-Palatinate, comprising the city of Trier and the district of Trier-Saarburg.

Trier was created for the inaugural 1949 federal election. Whilst the Christian Democratic Union won the plurality in the 2025 election, under the new voting system, their candidate did not actually win a seat in the Bundestag. This was due to the distribution of seats won by the CDU being decided by the first (direct) vote percentage of each winning CDU candidate, determining who took the seats. As the CDU candidate got a low vote of 30.4%, the seat will remain vacant throughout the 21st Bundestag.

== Geography ==
Trier is located in western Rhineland-Palatinate. As of the 2021 federal election, it comprises the independent city of Trier and the district of Trier-Saarburg.

== History ==
Trier was created in 1949. In the 1949 election, it was Rhineland-Palatinate constituency 7 in the numbering system. In the 1953 through 1976 elections, it was number 154. In the 1980 through 1998 elections, it was number 152. In the 2002 election, it was number 206. In the 2005 election, it was number 205. In the 2009 and 2013 elections, it was number 204. In the 2017 and 2021 elections, it was number 203. From the 2025 election, it has been number 202.

Originally, the constituency comprised the city of Trier, and the districts of Landkreis Trier and Saarburg. It acquired its current borders in the 1972 election.

Election	No.	Name	Borders
1949	7	Trier	Trier city; Landkreis Trier district; Saarburg district
1953	154	Trier	Trier city; Landkreis Trier district; Saarburg district
1957	154	Trier	Trier city; Landkreis Trier district; Saarburg district
1961	154	Trier	Trier city; Landkreis Trier district; Saarburg district
1965	154	Trier	Trier city; Landkreis Trier district; Saarburg district
1969	154	Trier	Trier city; Landkreis Trier district; Saarburg district
1972	154	Trier	Trier city; Trier-Saarburg district
1976	154	Trier	Trier city; Trier-Saarburg district
1980	152	Trier	Trier city; Trier-Saarburg district
1983	152	Trier	Trier city; Trier-Saarburg district
1987	152	Trier	Trier city; Trier-Saarburg district
1990	152	Trier	Trier city; Trier-Saarburg district
1994	152	Trier	Trier city; Trier-Saarburg district
1998	152	Trier	Trier city; Trier-Saarburg district
2002	206	Trier	Trier city; Trier-Saarburg district
2005	205	Trier	Trier city; Trier-Saarburg district
2009	204	Trier	Trier city; Trier-Saarburg district
2013	204	Trier	Trier city; Trier-Saarburg district
2017	203	Trier	Trier city; Trier-Saarburg district
2021	203	Trier	Trier city; Trier-Saarburg district
2025	202	Trier	Trier city; Trier-Saarburg district

== Members ==
The constituency has been held by the Christian Democratic Union (CDU) during all but two Bundestag terms since its creation. It was first represented by Heinrich Kemper of the CDU from 1949 to 1957, followed by Alois Zimmer until 1965 and Heinrich Holkenbrink until 1969. Carl-Ludwig Wagner then served from 1969 to 1976. Günther Schartz was representative from 1976 to 1994. Franz Peter Basten served a single term from 1994 to 1998 before Karl Diller won the constituency for the Social Democratic Party (SPD) in 1998. He served two terms. Bernhard Kaster regained it for the CDU in 2005 and served until 2017. Andreas Steier was elected in 2017. Verena Hubertz of the SPD won the constituency in 2021. The seat became vacant as a result of the 2025 election.

Election	Member	Party	%
1949	Heinrich Kemper	CDU	64.8
1953	Heinrich Kemper	CDU	67.2
1957	Alois Zimmer	CDU	66.9
1961	Alois Zimmer	CDU	62.0
1965	Heinrich Holkenbrink	CDU	61.0
1969	Carl-Ludwig Wagner	CDU	57.3
1972	Carl-Ludwig Wagner	CDU	52.8
1976	Günther Schartz	CDU	56.2
1980	Günther Schartz	CDU	51.9
1983	Günther Schartz	CDU	57.3
1987	Günther Schartz	CDU	52.0
1990	Günther Schartz	CDU	49.1
1994	Franz Peter Basten	CDU	47.6
1998	Karl Diller	SPD	45.2
2002	Karl Diller	SPD	43.7
2005	Bernhard Kaster	CDU	43.1
2009	Bernhard Kaster	CDU	45.7
2013	Bernhard Kaster	CDU	48.8
2017	Andreas Steier	CDU	37.9
2021	Verena Hubertz	SPD	33.0
2025	Vacant (Note: Dominik Sienkiewicz (CDU) won with 30.8% but seat remained vacant due to insufficient second votes cover.)		

== Election results ==
=== 2025 election ===
Under the new voting system implemented for the 2025 election, although the CDU candidate won the most votes in this constituency, due to the low winning percentage, the constituency seat will remain vacant as not enough second (party) votes were won to be allocated this seat.

Federal election (2025): Trier
Notes:	Blue background denotes the winner of the electorate vote. Pink background denotes a candidate elected from their party list. Yellow background denotes an electorate win by a list member, or other incumbent. A ✓ or ✗ denotes status of any incumbent, win or lose respectively.						
Party	Candidate	Votes	%	±%	Party votes	%	±%
CDU	Dominik Sienkiewicz	47,841	30.8	▲3.1	47,886	30.7	▲7.0
SPD	✗ Verena Hubertz	47,052	30.3	▼2.7	31,155	20.0	▼10.3
AfD	Marcel Philipps	22,101	14.2	▲8.6	24,103	15.5	▲9.3
Greens	Corinna Rüffer	12,834	8.3	▼4.8	19,025	12.2	▼3.4
Left	Lin Lindner	7,774	5.0	▲1.5	11,944	7.7	▲3.7
FDP	Gerd Benzmüller	6,151	4.0	▼3.0	7,266	4.7	▼6.5
BSW	Leo Miguez	5,358	3.4	New	6,842	4.4	New
FW	Niels Becker	4,127	2.7	▼2.5	3,192	2.0	▼1.6
Tierschutzpartei					1,717	1.1	▼0.3
Volt	Loreen Reeman	1,559	1.0	▲0.3	1,430	0.9	▲0.3
PARTEI					819	0.5	▼0.5
ÖDP	Matthias Reimann	619	0.4	▼0.1	312	0.2	0.0
BD					199	0.1	New
MLPD					37	<0.1	0.0
Informal votes		1,442			931		
Total valid votes		155,416			155,927		
Turnout		156,858	83.6	▲6.4			
Vacant gain from SPD	Majority						

=== 2021 election ===
Federal election (2021): Trier
Notes:	Blue background denotes the winner of the electorate vote. Pink background denotes a candidate elected from their party list. Yellow background denotes an electorate win by a list member, or other incumbent. A ✓ or ✗ denotes status of any incumbent, win or lose respectively.						
Party	Candidate	Votes	%	±%	Party votes	%	±%
SPD	Verena Hubertz	47,942	33.0	▼0.7	44,123	30.3	▲5.6
CDU	✗ Andreas Steier	40,299	27.7	▼10.2	34,578	23.7	▼13.5
Greens	Corinna Rüffer	18,939	13.0	▲6.6	22,708	15.6	▲6.6
FDP	Benjamin Palfner	10,135	7.0	▲1.7	16,206	11.1	▲1.9
AfD	Otto Hiller von Gaertringen	8,230	5.7	▼1.3	9,001	6.2	▼1.8
FW	Sascha Kohlmann	7,521	5.2	▲4.1	5,379	3.7	▲2.7
Left	Katrin Werner	5,126	3.5	▼3.1	5,712	3.9	▼4.7
Tierschutzpartei					2,003	1.4	
PARTEI	Michael Zeeb	2,174	1.5	▲0.2	1,507	1.0	0.0
dieBasis	Filiz Plenter	1,730	1.2		1,678	1.1	
Volt	Bettina Wolff	967	0.7		859	0.6	
Independent	Ingrid Moritz	807	0.6				
Pirates					538	0.4	0.0
ÖDP	Paul Lippl	657	0.5		363	0.2	0.0
Unabhängige	Jens Ahnemüller	595	0.4				
Team Todenhöfer					343	0.2	
DKP	Simon Becker	294	0.2				
Humanists					179	0.1	
V-Partei3					144	0.1	▼0.1
DiB					116	0.1	
NPD					114	0.1	▼0.1
LKR					50	0.0	
MLPD					30	0.0	0.0
Independent	Anna Batholomé	17	0.0				
Informal votes		1,738			1,540		
Total valid votes		145,433			145,631		
Turnout		147,171	77.2	▼1.3			
SPD gain from CDU	Majority	7,643	5.3				

=== 2017 election ===
Federal election (2017): Trier
Notes:	Blue background denotes the winner of the electorate vote. Pink background denotes a candidate elected from their party list. Yellow background denotes an electorate win by a list member, or other incumbent. A ✓ or ✗ denotes status of any incumbent, win or lose respectively.						
Party	Candidate	Votes	%	±%	Party votes	%	±%
CDU	Andreas Steier	56,611	37.9	▼10.9	55,882	37.3	▼6.7
SPD	Katarina Barley	50,283	33.7	▲2.6	36,950	24.7	▼1.6
AfD	Erwin Ludwig	10,414	7.0		11,926	8.0	▲3.8
Left	Katrin Werner	9,842	6.6	▲1.0	12,934	8.6	▲2.4
Greens	Corinna Rüffer	9,645	6.5	▼0.5	13,512	9.0	▼0.5
FDP	Adrian Assenmacher	7,910	5.3	▲3.4	13,841	9.2	▲4.3
PARTEI	Andrej Soffel	1,869	1.3	▲0.6	1,590	1.1	
FW	Stephan Wefelscheid	1,617	1.1	▼0.1	1,418	0.9	0.0
Independent	Albert Niesen	934	0.6				
Pirates					605	0.4	▼2.1
V-Partei³					361	0.2	
ÖDP					338	0.2	0.0
BGE					245	0.2	
NPD	Safet Babic	213	0.1	▼0.8	242	0.2	▼0.6
MLPD					37	0.0	0.0
Informal votes		2,213			1,670		
Total valid votes		149,338			149,881		
Turnout		151,551	78.6	▲5.8			
CDU hold	Majority	6,328	4.2	▼13.5			

=== 2013 election ===
Federal election (2013): Trier
Notes:	Blue background denotes the winner of the electorate vote. Pink background denotes a candidate elected from their party list. Yellow background denotes an electorate win by a list member, or other incumbent. A ✓ or ✗ denotes status of any incumbent, win or lose respectively.						
Party	Candidate	Votes	%	±%	Party votes	%	±%
CDU	✓ Bernhard Kaster	67,281	48.8	▲3.1	60,909	44.0	▲7.0
SPD	Katarina Barley	42,879	31.1	▲5.2	36,410	26.3	▲4.0
Greens	Corinna Rüffer	9,555	6.9	▼3.5	13,157	9.5	▼2.6
Left	Katrin Werner	7,687	5.6	▼3.0	8,688	6.3	▼3.3
Pirates	Andreas Brühl	3,863	2.8		3,508	2.5	▲0.7
FDP	Henrick Meine	2,656	1.9	▼6.4	6,841	4.9	▼10.1
AfD					5,736	4.1	
FW	Luda Adéle Liebe	1,653	1.2		1,289	0.9	
NPD	Safet Babic	1,287	0.9	0.0	1,043	0.8	▼0.1
PARTEI	Christian Nicolay	952	0.7				
ÖDP					290	0.2	0.0
Party of Reason					268	0.2	
PRO					173	0.1	
REP					136	0.1	▼0.2
MLPD					76	0.1	0.0
Informal votes		3,321			2,610		
Total valid votes		137,813			138,524		
Turnout		141,134	72.8	▲0.6			
CDU hold	Majority	24,402	17.7	▼2.1			

=== 2009 election ===
Federal election (2009): Trier
Notes:	Blue background denotes the winner of the electorate vote. Pink background denotes a candidate elected from their party list. Yellow background denotes an electorate win by a list member, or other incumbent. A ✓ or ✗ denotes status of any incumbent, win or lose respectively.						
Party	Candidate	Votes	%	±%	Party votes	%	±%
CDU	✓ Bernhard Kaster	61,594	45.7	▲2.6	50,210	36.9	▲0.8
SPD	Manfred Nink	34,948	25.9	▼14.7	30,348	22.3	▼13.9
Greens	Sascha Gottschalk	14,109	10.5	▲4.9	16,456	12.1	▲3.2
Left	Katrin Werner	11,583	8.6	▲4.2	13,070	9.6	▲3.8
FDP	Per Knöß	11,237	8.3	▲3.9	20,354	15.0	▲4.5
Pirates					2,483	1.8	
FAMILIE					1,111	0.8	▼0.1
NPD	Safet Babic	1,315	1.0	▼0.1	1,092	0.8	▼0.2
REP					347	0.3	▼0.2
ÖDP					284	0.2	
PBC					154	0.1	▼0.1
DVU					74	0.1	
MLPD					27	0.0	0.0
Informal votes		3,552			2,328		
Total valid votes		134,786			136,010		
Turnout		138,338	72.2	▼5.4			
CDU hold	Majority	26,646	19.8	▲17.3			

=== 2005 election ===
Federal election (2005):Trier
Notes:	Blue background denotes the winner of the electorate vote. Pink background denotes a candidate elected from their party list. Yellow background denotes an electorate win by a list member, or other incumbent. A ✓ or ✗ denotes status of any incumbent, win or lose respectively.						
Party	Candidate	Votes	%	±%	Party votes	%	±%
CDU	Bernhard Kaster	60,422	43.1	▲1.8	50,775	36.1	▼2.5
SPD	✗ Karl Diller	56,943	40.6	▼3.0	50,891	36.2	▼3.8
Greens	Corinna Rüffer	7,863	5.6	▼0.6	12,467	8.9	▼0.9
FDP	Christoph Pitsch	6,210	4.4	▼1.0	14,752	10.5	▲2.1
Left	Albert Schtschepik	6,141	4.4	▲3.4	8,133	5.8	▲4.8
NPD	Safet Babic	1,561	1.1	▲0.4	1,478	1.1	▲0.5
Familie					1,297	0.9	
Independent	David Weiss	1,016	0.7				
REP					605	0.4	0.0
PBC					243	0.2	0.0
MLPD					82	0.1	
Informal votes		3,725			3,158		
Total valid votes		140,156			140,723		
Turnout		143,881	77.6	▼1.6			
CDU gain from SPD	Majority	3,479	2.5				
