= UI GreenMetric =

University rankings published annually by Universitas Indonesia

UI GreenMetric World University Rankings
- Founded: 2010
- Founder: Riri Fitri Sari
- Official language: English
- Chairperson: Riri Fitri Sari
- Website: greenmetric.ui.ac.id

The UI GreenMetric is an annual international ranking of the sustainability performance of universities. Universities are given a score reflecting their efforts in reducing the ecological footprint of the university and sustainability education and research. The ranking was launched in 2010 by the University of Indonesia to promote sustainability in higher education institutions and allow comparisons between them. Since then, the number of participants has grown and the methodology has been refined based on feedback from participating universities.

== Methodology and criteria ==
Universities are asked annually between May and October to participate by filling a survey with questions about their sustainability performance. Many questions in this survey also demand uploading evidence documents to avoid cheating. The results are published in December.

Since 2014, participating universities are ranked according to the following six criteria. The points per indicator are given in brackets.

Criteria and indicators of the UI GreenMetric
Abbr.	Criterion	Weight	Indicators
SI	Setting & Infrastructure	15%	The ratio of open space area to total area (200); Total area on campus covered in forest vegetation (100); Total area on campus covered in planted vegetation (200); Total area on campus for water absorption besides the forest and planted vegetation (100); The total open space area divided by total campus population (200); Percentage of university budget for sustainability efforts (200); Percentage of operation and maintenance activities of building during COVID-19 pandemic (100); Campus facilities for disabled, special needs and or maternity care (100); Security and safety facilities (100); Health infrastructure facilities for students, academics and administrative staff's wellbeing (100); Conservation: plant, animal and wildlife, genetic resources for food and agriculture secured in either medium or long-term conservation facilities (100)
EC	Energy & Climate Change	21%	Energy efficient appliances usage (200); Smart building implementation (300); Number of renewable energy sources on campus (300); Total electricity usage divided by total campus' population (kWh per person) (300); The ratio of renewable energy production divided by total energy usage per year (200); Elements of green building implementation as reflected in all construction and renovation policies (200); Greenhouse gas emission reduction program (200); Total carbon footprint divided by total campus' population (metric tons per person) (200); Number of innovative program(s) during COVID-19 pandemic (100); Impactful university program(s) on climate change (100)
WS	Waste	18%	Recycling program for university's waste (300); Program to reduce the use of paper and plastic on campus (300); Organic waste treatment (300); Inorganic waste treatment (300); Toxic waste treatment (300); Sewage disposal (300)
WS	Water	10%	Water conservation program & implementation (200); Water recycling program implementation (200); Water efficient appliances usage (200); Consumption of treated water (200); Percentage of additional handwashing and sanitation facilities during COVID-19 pandemic (200)
TR	Transportation	18%	The total number of vehicles (cars and motorcycles) divided by total campus' population (200); Shuttle services (300); Zero Emission Vehicles (ZEV) policy on campus (200); The total number of Zero Emission Vehicles (ZEV) divided by total campus population (200); Ratio of ground parking area to total campus' area (200); Program to limit or decrease the parking area on campus for the last 3 years (from 2018 to 2020) (200); Number of initiatives to decrease private vehicles on campus (200); Pedestrian path on campus (300)
ED	Education & Research	18%	The ratio of sustainability courses to total courses/modules (300); The ratio of sustainability research funding towards total research funding (200); Number of scholarly publications on sustainability (200); Number of events related to sustainability (200); Number of student organizations related to sustainability (200); University-run sustainability website (200); Sustainability report (100); Number of cultural activities on campus (100); Number of university program(s) to cope with COVID-19 pandemic (100); Number of sustainability community services project organized and/or involving students (100); Number of sustainability-related startups (100)

== Participants ==
During the first ranking in 2010, 96 universities participated. The University of California, Berkeley came in first place. Since the 2010 edition, the number of participating universities grew to 1745 in 2025.

Top 10 universities in the UI GreenMetric 2021
No	University	Country	Total score
1	Wageningen University and Research	Netherlands	9300
2	University of Nottingham	United Kingdom	8850
3	University of Groningen	Netherlands	8800
4	Nottingham Trent University	United Kingdom	8750
5	University of California Davis	United Kingdom	8750
6	Umwelt-Campus Birkenfeld (Trier University of Applied Sciences)	Germany	8725
7	Leiden University	Netherlands	8700
8	University College Cork	Ireland	8700
9	University of Connecticut	United States	8700
10	Universidade de São Paulo	Brazil	8700

Participants and winner of the UI GreenMetric per year
Year	Number of participants	Winner	Country
2010	96	University of California Berkeley	United States
2011	178	University of Nottingham	United Kingdom
2012	215	University of Connecticut	United States
2013	301	University of Nottingham	United Kingdom
2014	361	University of Nottingham	United Kingdom
2015	407	University of Nottingham	United Kingdom
2016	516	University of California Davis	United States
2017	619	Wageningen University and Research	Netherlands
2018	719	Wageningen University and Research	Netherlands
2019	780	Wageningen University and Research	Netherlands
2020	912	Wageningen University and Research	Netherlands
2021	956	Wageningen University and Research	Netherlands
2022	1050	Wageningen University and Research	Netherlands
2023	1182	Wageningen University and Research	Netherlands
2024	1476	Wageningen University and Research	Netherlands
2025	1745	Wageningen University and Research	Netherlands
