= Verena Hubertz =

German politician (born 1987)

Verena Hubertz MdB
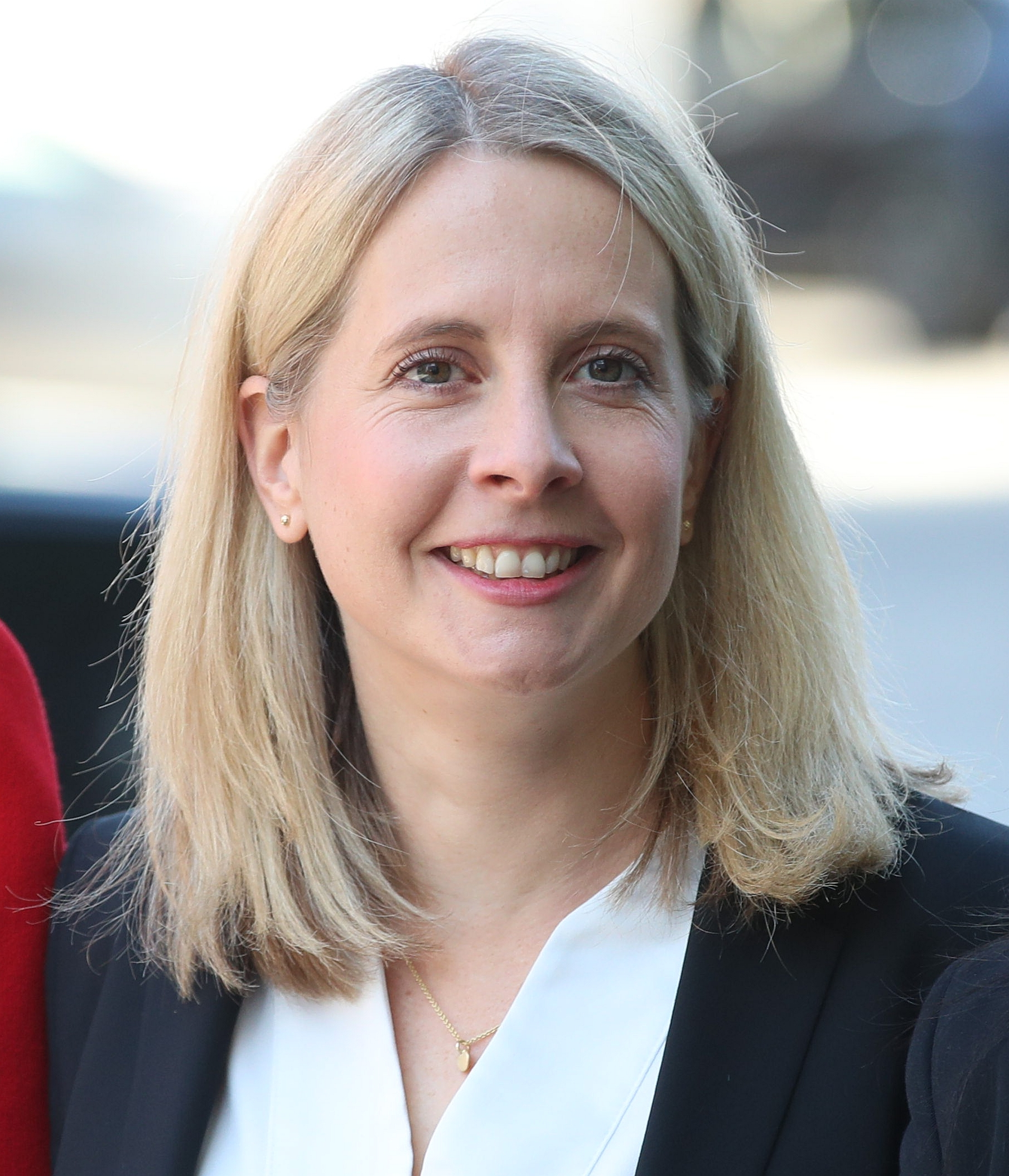
- Hubertz in 2025

Minister for Housing, Urban Development and Building
- Incumbent
- Assumed office 6 May 2025
- Chancellor: Friedrich Merz
- Preceded by: Klara Geywitz

Member of the Bundestag for Trier
- Incumbent
- Assumed office 26 September 2021
- Preceded by: Andreas Steier

Personal details
- Born: 26 November 1987 (age 38) Trier, West Germany
- Party: SPD
- Children: 1
- Education: Trier University of Applied Sciences (Bachelor); WHU – Otto Beisheim School of Management (MSc)
- Occupation: politician

Verena Ute Hubertz (German: [veˈʁeːna ˈhuːbɛʁts]; born 26 November 1987) is a German entrepreneur and politician of the Social Democratic Party (SPD) who has been serving as Federal Minister for Housing, Urban Development and Building in the government of Chancellor Friedrich Merz since 2025.

Hubertz was first elected as a member of the Bundestag from the state of Rhineland-Palatinate in 2021.

== Early life and education ==
Hubertz was born in Trier in 1987 as the daughter of a locksmith and a parish expert worker. She grew up in Konz and Lampaden. After graduating from high school, she studied business administration at Trier University of Applied Sciences (Bachelor) and at WHU - Otto Beisheim School of Management in Vallendar (MSc). She gained her first professional experience at the Lebenshilfe-Werke Trier, Vodafone, PricewaterhouseCoopers and Commerzbank.

== Business career ==
After successfully completing her studies, she went to Berlin to work with a fellow student to found startup Kitchen Stories, a video-based cooking platform with over 20 million users and 60 employees. In 2017, BSH became the majority owner of Kitchen Stories. At the end of 2020, she gave up her position as managing director to run for the Bundestag in her home constituency.

== Political career ==
Hubertz became a member of the Bundestag in the 2021 German federal election. She won the direct mandate in the constituency of Trier with a 5.3% lead over incumbent Andreas Steier. She has since been serving as one of her parliamentary group's deputy chairs, under the leadership of chairman Rolf Mützenich.

In the federal election on 23 February 2025, Verena Hubertz narrowly lost to Dominik Sienkiewicz, the CDU's direct candidate in the Trier constituency, with 0.5% fewer first votes. However, thanks to her security on the state list, Hubertz retained her Bundestag mandate. However, as a result of the 2023 electoral reform, Sienkiewicz was not elected to the Bundestag due to a lack of second vote coverage.

In the negotiations to form a Grand Coalition under the leadership of Friedrich Merz's Christian Democrats (CDU together with the Bavarian CSU) and the SPD following the 2025 German elections, Hubertz was part of the SPD delegation in the working group on economic affairs, industry and tourism, led by Jens Spahn, Hansjörg Durz and Alexander Schweitzer. After the election she joined the Merz cabinet as Federal Minister for Housing, Urban Development and Building.

In October 2026, Hubertz announced her intention to found a federally owned housing company. She explained that she had clarified the necessary finances with Finance Minister Lars Klingbeil. The federal government is to hold 51 percent of the shares and 49 external corporations or municipal housing companies.

== Other activities ==
=== Corporate boards ===
- KfW, Member of the Board of Supervisory Directors (since 2022)

=== Non-profit organizations ===
- Business Forum of the Social Democratic Party of Germany, Member of the Political Advisory Board (since 2022)
- German Association for Small and Medium-Sized Businesses (BVMW), Member of the Political Advisory Board (since 2022)
