= Andreas Steier =

German politician

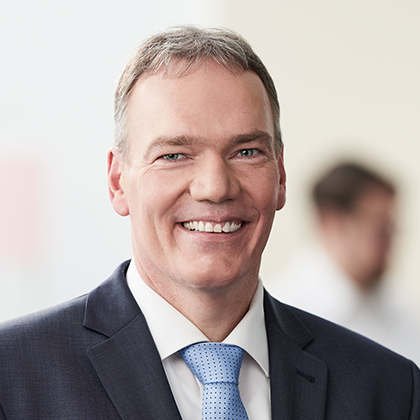
- Andreas Steier in 2017

Member of the Bundestag for Trier
- In office 2017–2021
- Preceded by: Bernhard Kaster
- Succeeded by: Verena Hubertz

Personal details
- Born: 7 January 1972 (age 54) Trier, West Germany
- Party: CDU
- Education: University of Kaiserslautern

Andreas Steier (born 7 January 1972) is a German engineer and politician of the Christian Democratic Union (CDU) who served as a member of the Bundestag from the state of Rhineland-Palatinate from 2017 to 2021.

== Political career ==
Steier became a member of the Bundestag in the 2017 German federal election. In parliament, he was a member of the Committee on Education, Research and Technology Assessment. In this capacity, he served as his parliamentary group's rapporteur on artificial intelligence.
