= Lin Lindner =

German politician (born 1994)

- Constituency: Rhineland-Palatinate

Personal details
- Born: 1994 (age 31–32)
- Party: Die Linke (since 2023)

Lino Lindner (born 1994) is a German politician serving as a member of the Bundestag since 2025. They (Note: Lindner uses they/them pronouns.) have served as chair of Die Linke in Trier since 2024.

== Biography ==
Lindner grew up in Traben-Trarbach. According to them, their "political engagement began as an angry working class kid in the Punk scene". They graduated from a traineeship in an editorial office in Hesse, and then studied cultural and media education at the Merseburg University of Applied Sciences. They then completed a master's degree in media and culture sociology at the University of Trier.

Lindner has served as chair of Die Linke in Trier since 2024. During the 2025 German federal election, they were a candidate in the Trier electoral district, and placed in third on the Die Linke's Rhineland-Palatinate list, but initially was not elected to the Bundestag. According to the newspaper Frankfurter Allgemeine Zeitung, Lindner was to join the Bundestag in place of Gerhard Trabert in summer 2025, as he had suffered multiple strokes. As of August 2026, Lindner has not become a member of the Bundestag. The reason is that due to health issues, Trabert is incapable of issuing the statement of resigning from his Bundestag seat, and his legal guardians are not allowed to make this statement in his place. Lindner also ran for the Landtag of Rhineland-Palatinate election in 2026.

Linder is transgender and non-binary and lives in Trier.
