= Corinna Rüffer =

German politician (born 1975)

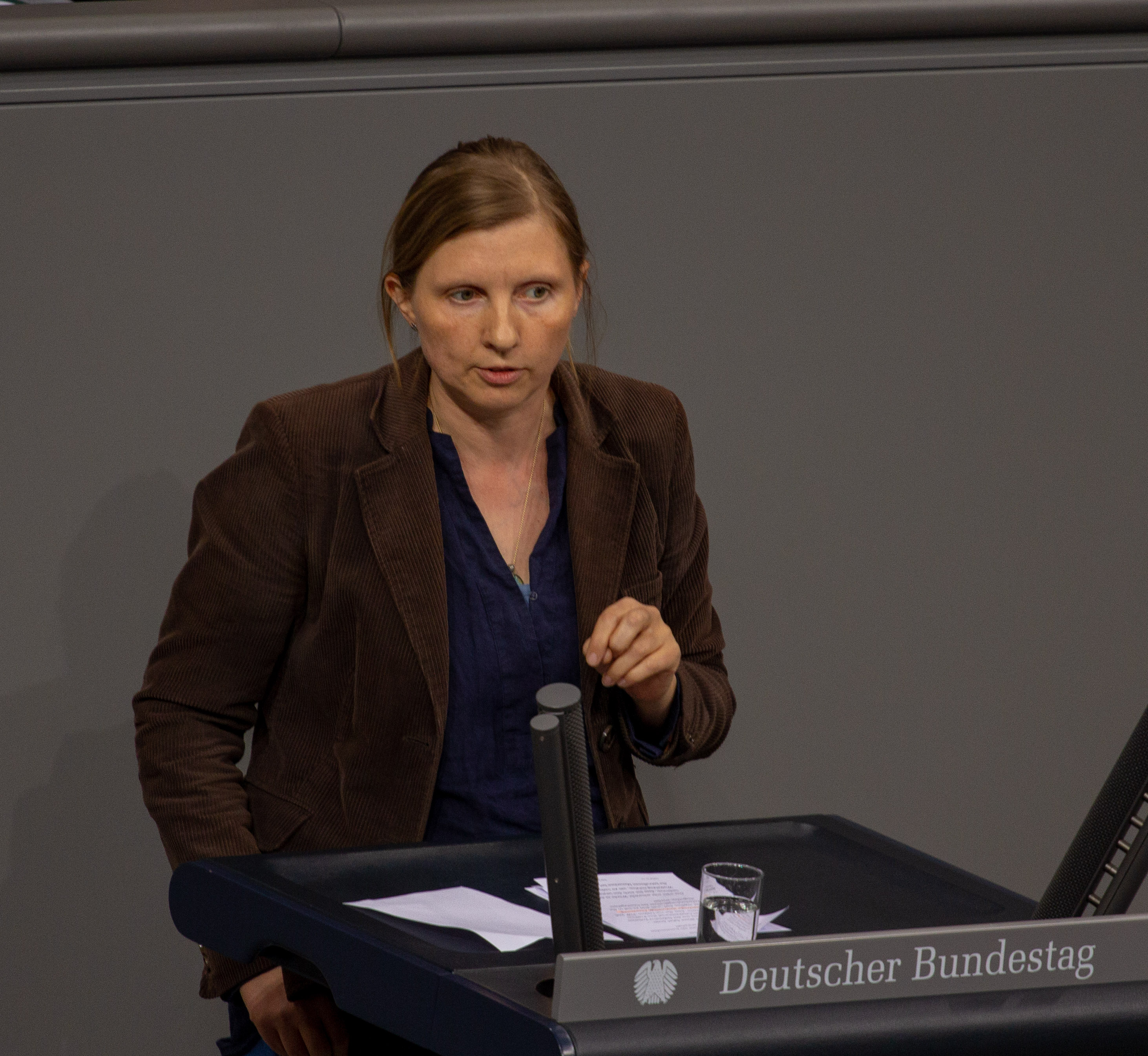
- Corinna Rüffer in 2019

Member of the Bundestag
- Incumbent
- Assumed office 2017

Personal details
- Born: 11 October 1975 (age 50) Osnabrück, West Germany (now Germany)
- Party: Greens

Corinna Rüffer (born 11 October 1975) is a German politician of Alliance 90/The Greens who has been serving as a member of the Bundestag from the state of Rhineland-Palatinate since 2013.

== Early life and education ==
Born in Osnabrück, Lower Saxony, Rüffer studied political science and public law at the University of Trier (without a degree).

== Political career ==
In 1999 Rüffer joined the Bündnis 90/Die Grünen party. She became a member of the Bundestag in the 2013 German federal election, representing the Trier constituency. In parliament, she is a member of the Committee on Labour and Social Affairs and the Committee on Petitions. She also serves as her parliamentary group's spokesperson for disability policy and citizens' affairs.

== Other activities ==
- Bundesarbeitsgemeinschaft Inklusionsfirmen (BAG IF), Member of the Advisory Board
