= Karl Diller =

German politician

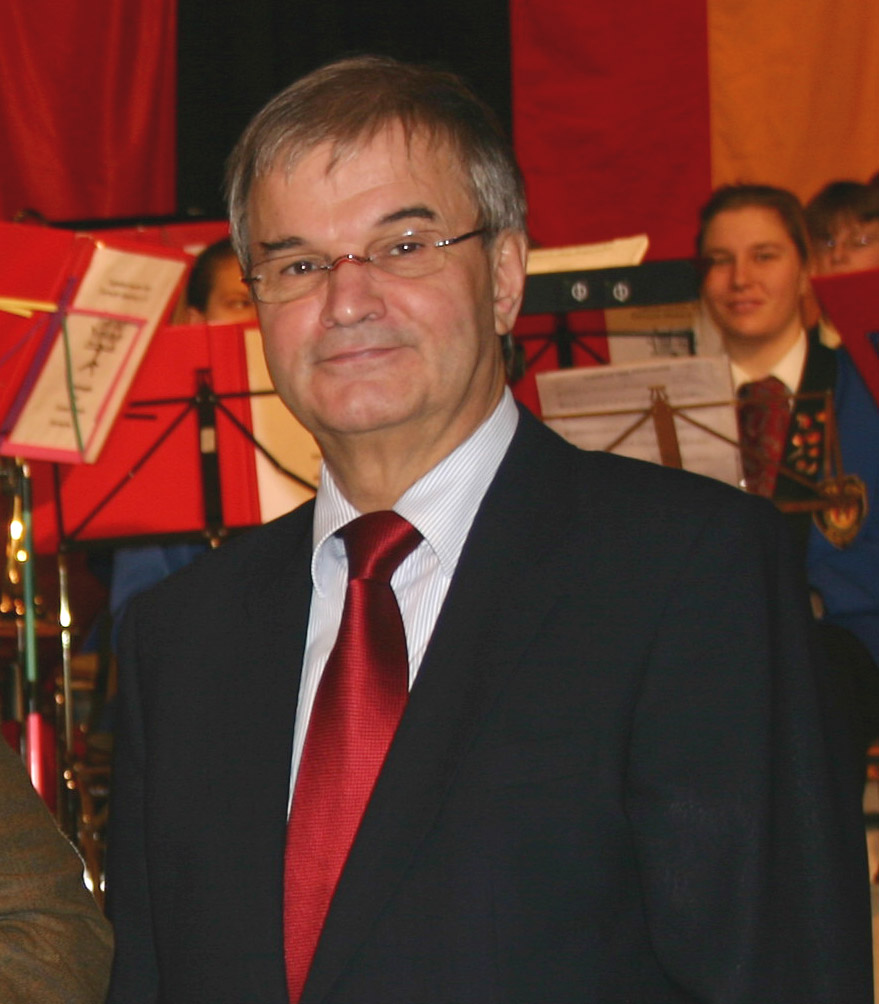
- Karl Diller in 2005

Member of the Bundestag
- In office 1987–2009

Personal details
- Born: 27 January 1941 (age 85) Kaiserslautern, West Germany (now Germany)
- Party: SPD

Karl Diller (born 27 January 1941) is a German politician. Born in Kaiserslautern, Rhineland-Palatinate, he represents the SPD. Karl Diller has served as a member of the Bundestag from the state of Rhineland-Palatinate from 1987 until 2009.

== Life ==
From 1979 to 1987 he was a member of the state parliament of Rhineland-Palatinate. From 1998 to 2009 he was Parliamentary State Secretary to the Federal Minister of Finance.
