= Trier University of Applied Sciences =

Coordinates: 49°46′05″N 6°37′46″E

- Hochschule Trier
- Motto: "Diverse. future-oriented. leading the way"
- Type: Public University of Applied Sciences
- Established: 1971
- President: Prof. Dr. Dorit Schumann
- Students: 6.231 (2023)
- Location: Trier, Hoppstädten-Weiersbach, Idar-Oberstein, Rhineland-Palatinate, Germany
- Website: www.hochschule-trier.de/en

The Trier University of Applied Sciences (German: Hochschule Trier) is one of the largest Universities of Applied Sciences in Rhineland-Palatinate with approximately 6000 students, around 170 professors and around 700 academic and nonacademic staff. It is spread over three campuses in Trier (main campus Schneidershof), Birkenfeld (Environmental Campus Birkenfeld), and Idar-Oberstein (Gemstones and Jewellery). It is a member of the European University Association (EUA).

== One university, three campuses ==
=== Main Campus Schneidershof ===
Trier University of Applied Sciences' largest campus, the Main Campus Schneidershof, is located a few minutes' walk from Trier's city centre and its Roman monuments. Schneidershof is situated on a hill in the middle of the forest and offers a view of the Moselle, the Kaiser Wilhelm Bridge and Trier's city centre. The Main Campus is also located directly on the Moselsteig hiking trail.

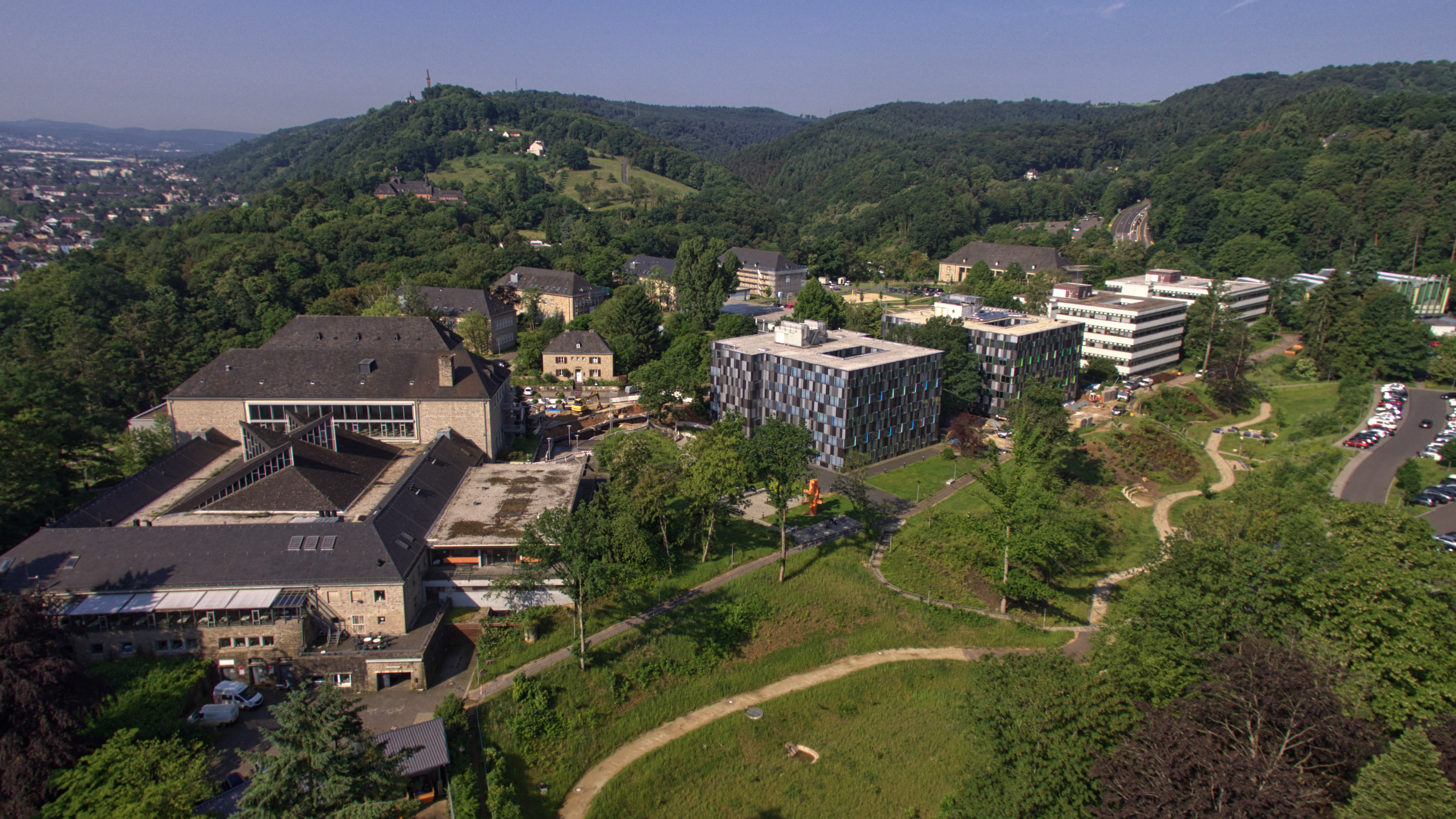
Trier University of Applied Sciences main campus from the north-east

The university administration and the most important service facilities, such as the university library, the Career Service, the International Office and the Student Services, are located in the buildings, some of which are classified as historical monuments. The departments of Civil and Supply Engineering + Food Technology, Computer Science, Engineering, Business as well as Design with the subject area Architecture are located on the main campus and offer 24 Bachelor's, 14 Master's and 9 dual courses of study.

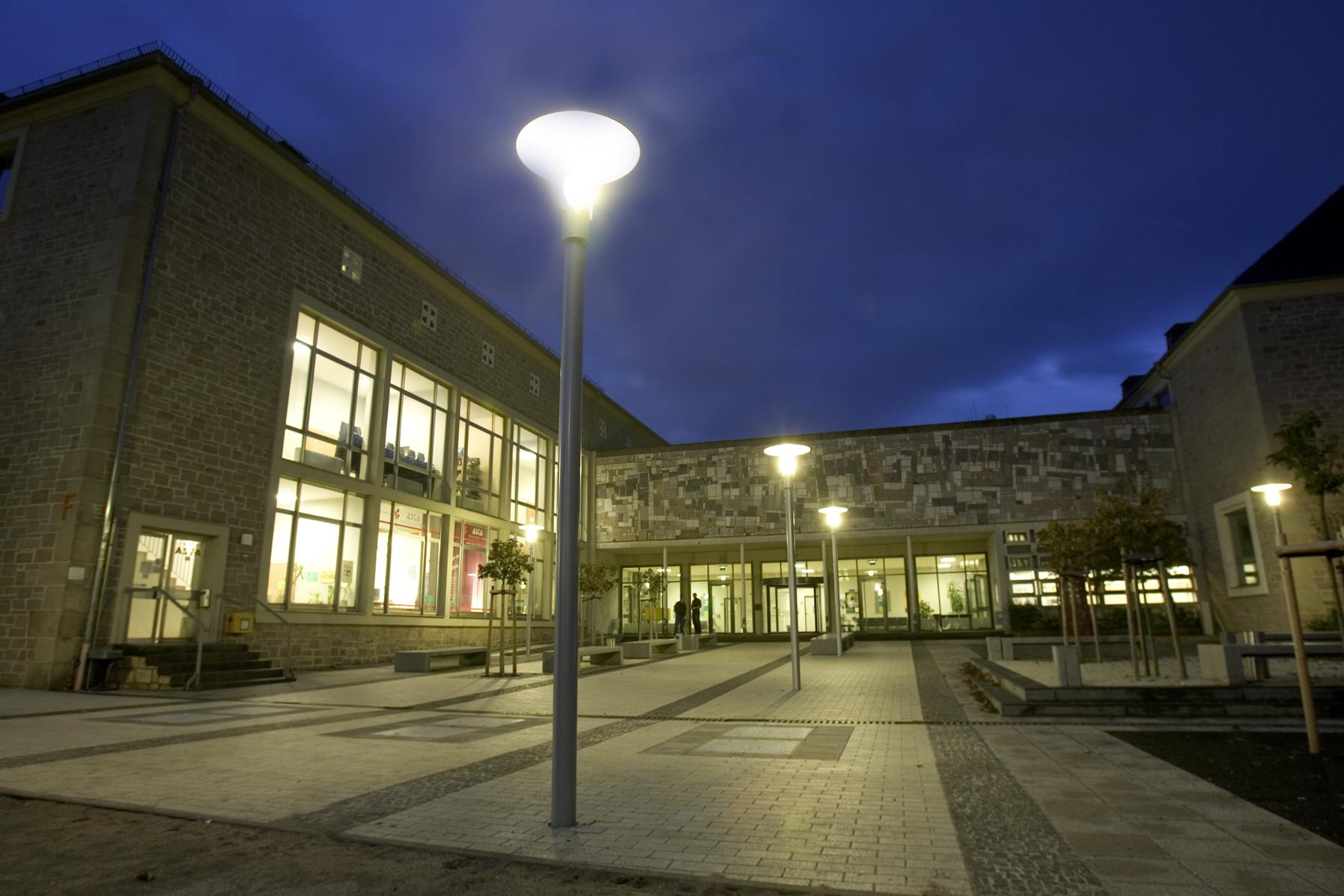
Main entrance main campus

Trier University of Applied Sciences cooperates with the Studierendenwerk Trier on the subject of housing. The Studierendenwerk Trier runs five student residences with a total of 1,617 rooms. The Martinskloster housing complex is located close to Trier University of Applied Sciences and can be reached on foot. A sports field in the middle of the campus grounds and a canteen are available to students and staff. Right next to the campus is the Weißhauswald outdoor recreation area with the Villa Weißhaus, a high-ropes course and a wildlife enclosure.

=== Environmental Campus Birkenfeld ===
The Environmental Campus Birkenfeld (UCB) is located about five kilometres south of the city of Birkenfeld in the upper Nahe valley, in the district of Neubrücke in the municipality of Hoppstädten-Weiersbach. The campus is also located only a few kilometres from the Hunsrück-Hochwald National Park. With its zero-emissions concept, the campus was named "Germany's most sustainable university location" and ranked sixth in a worldwide comparison of 1,050 universities from 85 countries participating in the renowned UI GreenMetric ranking.

In addition to an ecological building concept, the campus has a CO_{2}-neutral energy and heat supply as well as modern building and systems technology. It was founded in 1996 and is a former reserve hospital of the American armed forces.

At the Environmental Campus, all degree programmes deal with the topic of environment, from a technical, economic, legal or social perspective. In two departments, Environmental Planning/Environmental Technology and Environmental Business/Environmental Law, 16 Bachelor's and 14 Master's degree programmes are offered, as well as 8 dual courses of study.

Over 600 dormitory places directly on the grounds of the Environmental Campus Birkenfeld are available to students, as are various sports fields and a canteen.

see Environmental Campus Birkenfeld

=== Campus of Art and Design ===
The Campus of Art and Design has two locations: the Irminenfreihof and Paulusplatz buildings in the heart of Trier, where the subjects of Architecture, Intermedia Design, Interior Architecture, Fashion Design and Communication Design are studied, and the location of the Gemstones and Jewellery department in the famous gemstone city of Idar-Oberstein.

In Trier's city centre, the Campus of Art and Design is housed in two old buildings: the building of the former Dominican monastery of St. Katharina at Irminenfreihof, which was built in the 18th century under the master builder Johannes Seiz, and the building of the former School of Crafts and Applied Arts at Paulusplatz, which was inaugurated in 1912 by the city architect Balduin Schilling.

The Campus of Art and Design offers a total of 6 Bachelor's and 6 Master's degree programmes - one Bachelor's and one Master's degree programme per subject area.

== Teaching and research profile ==
According to the third-party funding statistics of Trier University of Applied Sciences, professors and staff at Trier University of Applied Sciences raised around €16.7 million in third-party funding in 2022. This makes Trier University of Applied Sciences the most third-party funded university of applied sciences in Rhineland-Palatinate.

Around 170 professors research and teach at Trier University of Applied Sciences in three main research areas: Sustainability, Digitalisation and Health.

=== Doctoral studies ===
Trier University of Applied Sciences counted around 80 doctoral students in 2022.

A doctorate is possible in all seven faculties as part of a cooperation with a university or another institution in Germany or abroad that is authorised to award doctorates. The doctoral students are either integrated into research programmes funded by the state of Rhineland-Palatinate or do their doctorate cooperatively via third-party funded projects, as research assistants at Trier University of Applied Sciences, with the help of scholarships or as external doctoral candidates.

The federal-state programme "FH-Personal" is currently funding the development of a cross-university doctoral programme called "Intelligent Technologies for Sustainable Development" as part of the "House of Professors" infrastructure project (duration 2021-2027), which provides for a total of eleven new doctoral positions and supports current doctorates in the graduate programme. This includes regular skills workshops, constant networking options, a mentoring programme and doctoral counselling.

At the University Rectors' Conference in Trier on 8 May 2023, Minister President Malu Dreyer announced the introduction of the independent right to award doctorates for universities of applied sciences with strong research capabilities in Rhineland-Palatinate by the end of the current legislative period. The Rhineland-Palatinate Higher Education Act is expected to be amended accordingly in 2025.

=== Profile topics ===
==== Sustainability ====
Researchers in the research area of Sustainability or Applied Material Flow Management raised around 5.5 million euros in third-party funding in 2022.

The Institute for Applied Material Flow Management (IfaS) mainly forms the research focus Applied Material Flow Management. In a Germany-wide comparison, the IfaS is one of the institutes with the most third-party funding at universities of applied sciences. It is located at the Environmental Campus in Birkenfeld, where more than 50 employees of the institute are currently working on the intelligent and resource-efficient management of material and energy flows.

==== Digitalisation ====
In 2022, researchers in the Digitalisation or Intelligent Technologies for Sustainable Development research focus area raised around 3.8 million euros in third-party funding.

Scientists working in the research focus Intelligent Technologies for Sustainable Development develop resource-efficient technologies and processes for society and industry of the future, often in interdisciplinary alliances. The focus is divided into four fields of research:

- Information Systems for Sustainable Development (ISNE)
- Energy Efficient Systems (EES)
- Environmentally Friendly Production Processes (UVP) and
- Concepts for Future Mobility (MOZ).

Currently, 15 professors at the Main Campus and at the Environmental Campus Birkenfeld are working on research and development of intelligent technologies in these four fields.

==== Health ====
Researchers in the research area of Health or Life Sciences (medical, bio and pharmaceutical technology) raised around 1.8 million euros in third-party funding in 2022.

The third research focus, Life Sciences, is represented by researchers who are working on innovative solutions for

- medical technology
- pharmaceutical technology and
- biotechnology.

Their work is usually characterised by a high degree of interdisciplinarity. The constant integration of state-of-the-art technologies creates new interdisciplinary fields of research and development in this area.

== Internationalisation ==
As part of its five-year internationalisation strategy for the period 2022-2026, Trier University of Applied Sciences has developed strategic goals to strengthen its global presence. These goals include areas such as study and teaching, research and transfer as well as institutional anchoring.

Trier University of Applied Sciences has strong international networks in research and teaching. Thanks to its central location in the heart of Europe, right next to Luxembourg, France and Belgium, it offers optimal conditions for cross-border cooperation. With a diverse student body from over 100 nations and a proportion of almost 25 per cent international students, the university actively shapes the intercultural university environment. It also maintains over 120 international research and teaching collaborations worldwide (as of 2024).

== Departments ==
Trier University of Applied Sciences is organisationally divided into seven departments. The departments of Civil and Supply Engineering + Food Technology, Computer Science, Engineering and Business are located at the Main Campus in Trier. Two further departments are located at the Environmental Campus Birkenfeld: Environmental Business/Environmental Law and Environmental Planning/Environmental Technology. The Department of Art and Design is represented in Trier as well as in Idar-Oberstein. In detail, these are the departments:

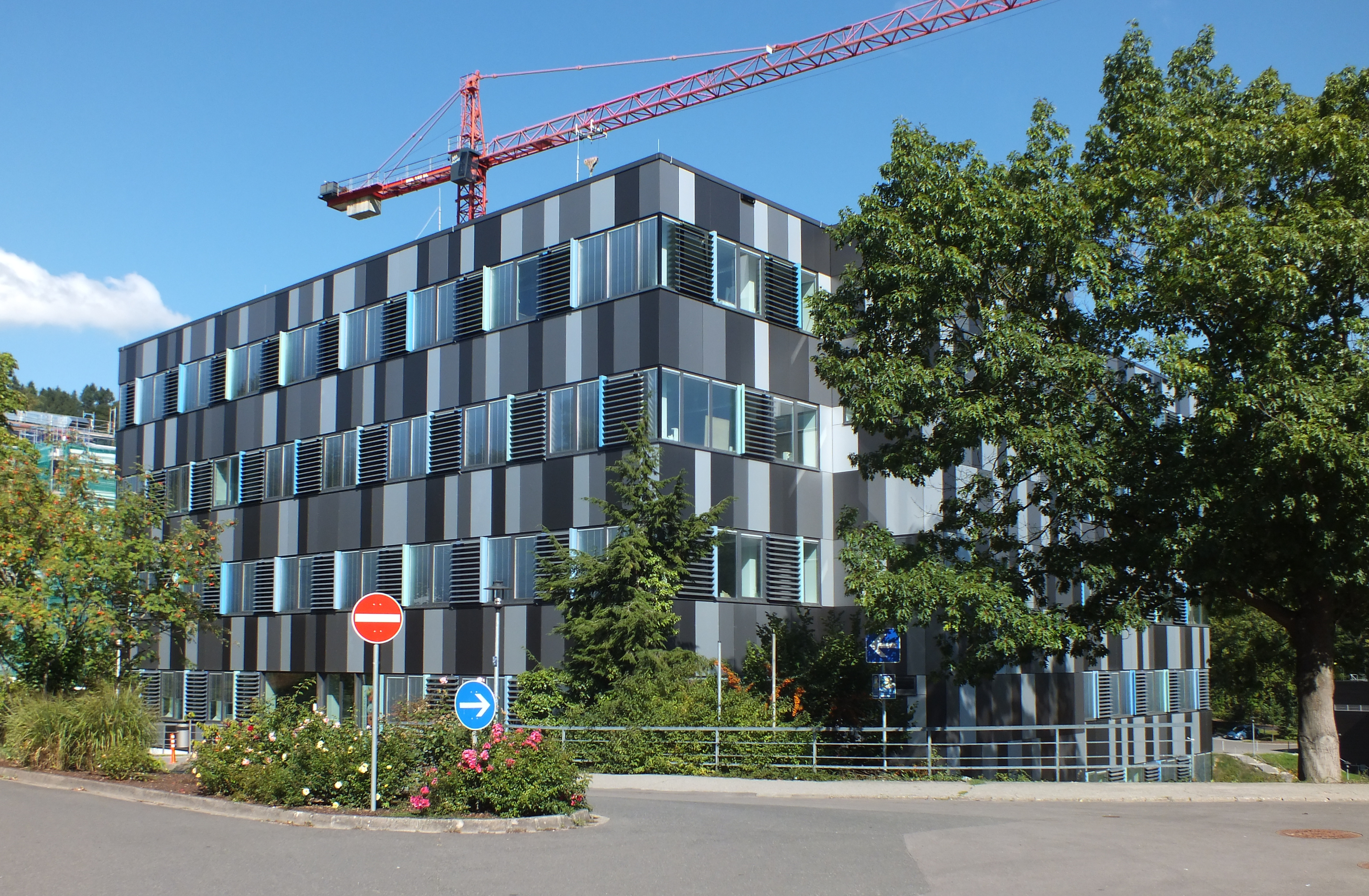
Building D - Department of Civil and Supply Engineering + Food Technology

=== Department of Civil and Supply Engineering + Food Technology ===
The Department of Civil and Supply Engineering + Food Technology is composed of the subject areas of Civil Engineering, Technical Building Services and Food Technology.

Bachelor's degree programmes

- Civil Engineering (B.Eng.)
- Civil Engineering dual (B.Eng.)
- Energy Technology - Renewable and Efficient Energy Systems (B.Eng.)
- Food Technology (B.Eng.)
- Technical Building Equipment and Supply Engineering (B.Eng.)

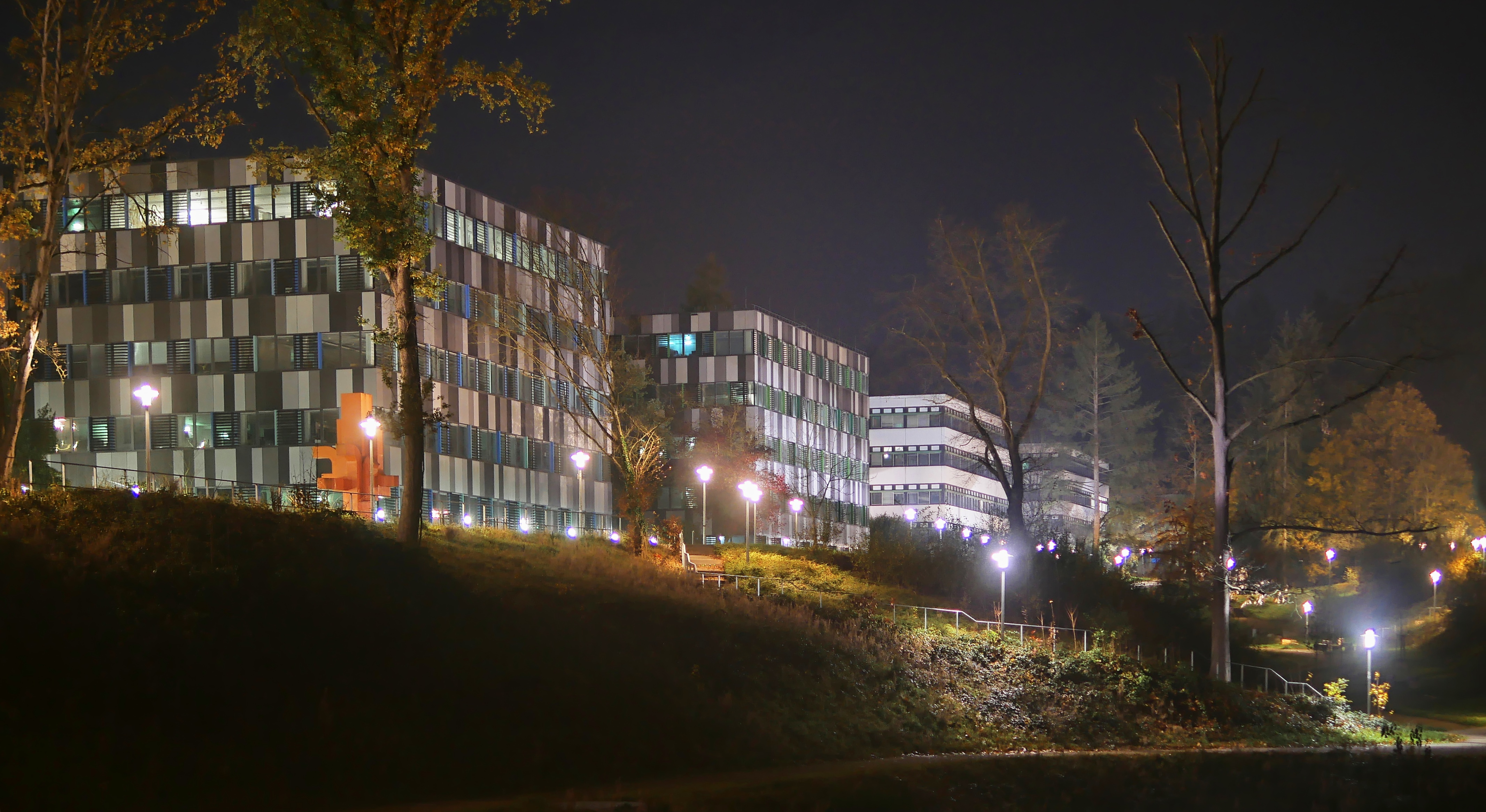
On the left, buildings D and C already renovated in 2017; on the right, buildings B and A in their original state

Master's degree programmes

- Civil Engineering (M.Eng.)
- Energy Management (M.Eng.)
- Interdisciplinary Engineering (M.Sc.)
- Food Technology (M.Eng.)
- Network Technology and Operation (M.Eng.)

=== Department of Art and Design ===
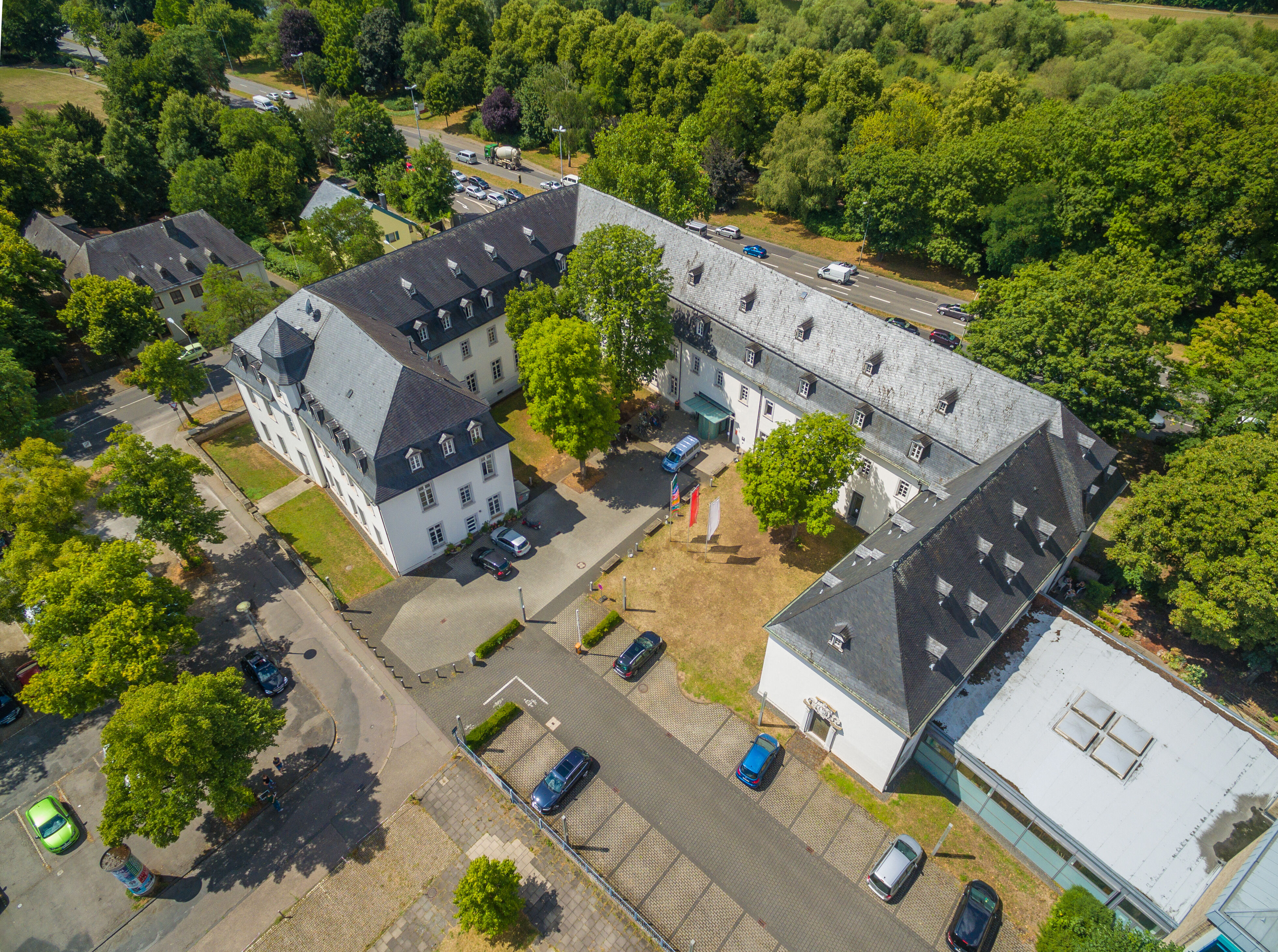
Campus of Art and Design - Irminenfreihof

The Department of Art and Design is composed of the subject areas of Architecture, Interior Design, Intermedia Design, Fashion Design, Communication Design (at the Trier site) and Gemstones and Jewellery (at the Idar-Oberstein site).

Bachelor's degree programmes

- Architecture (B.A.)
- Gemstones and Jewellery (B.F.A.)
- Interior Design (B.A.)
- Intermedia Design (B.A.)
- Communication Design (B.A.)
- Fashion Design (B.A.)

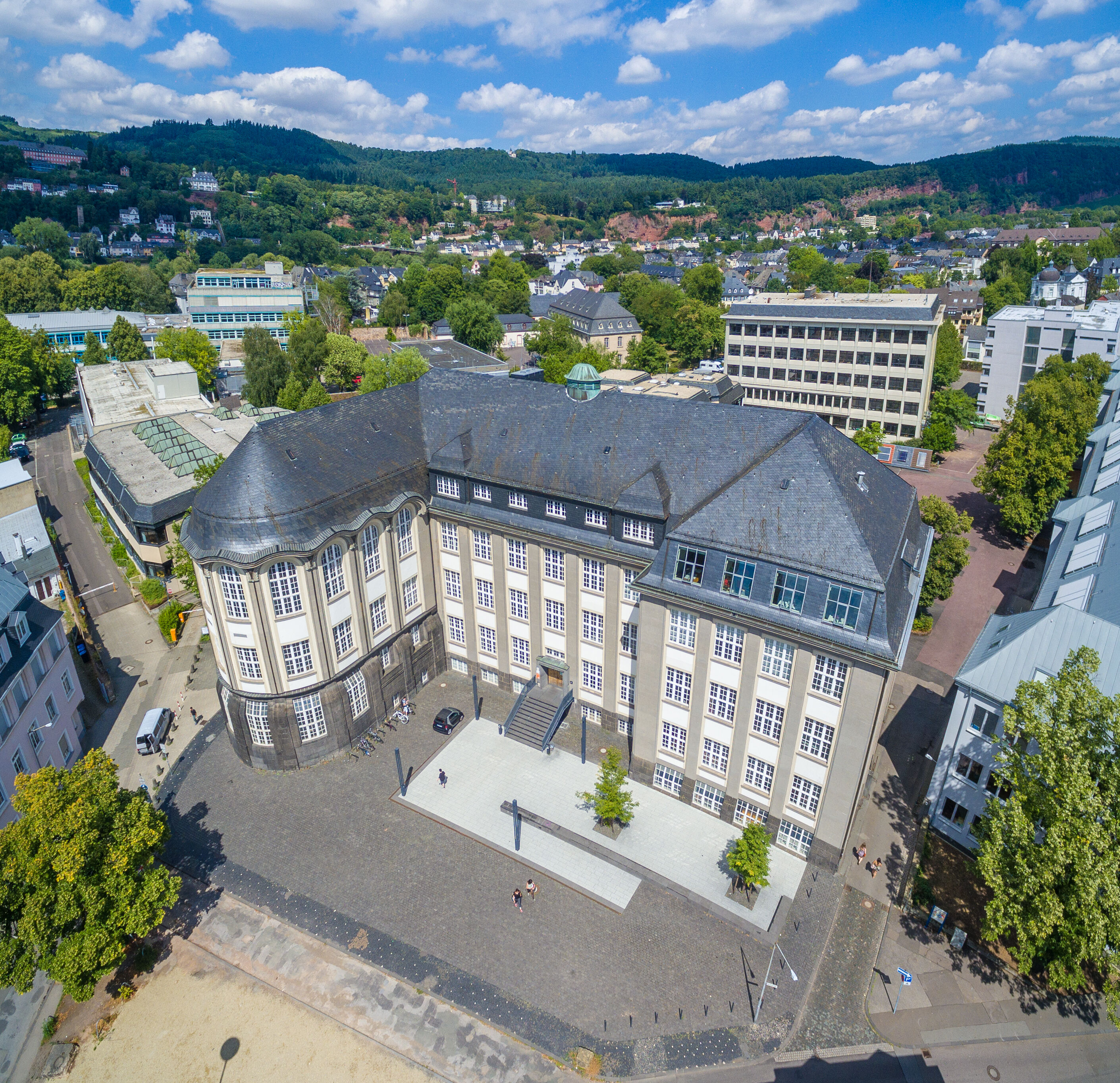
Campus of Art and Design - Paulusplatz

Master's degree programmes

- Architecture (M.A.)
- Gemstones and Jewellery (M.F.A.)
- Interior Design (M.A.)
- Intermedia Design (M.A.)
- Communication Design (M.A.)
- Fashion Design (M.A.)

=== Department of Computer Science ===
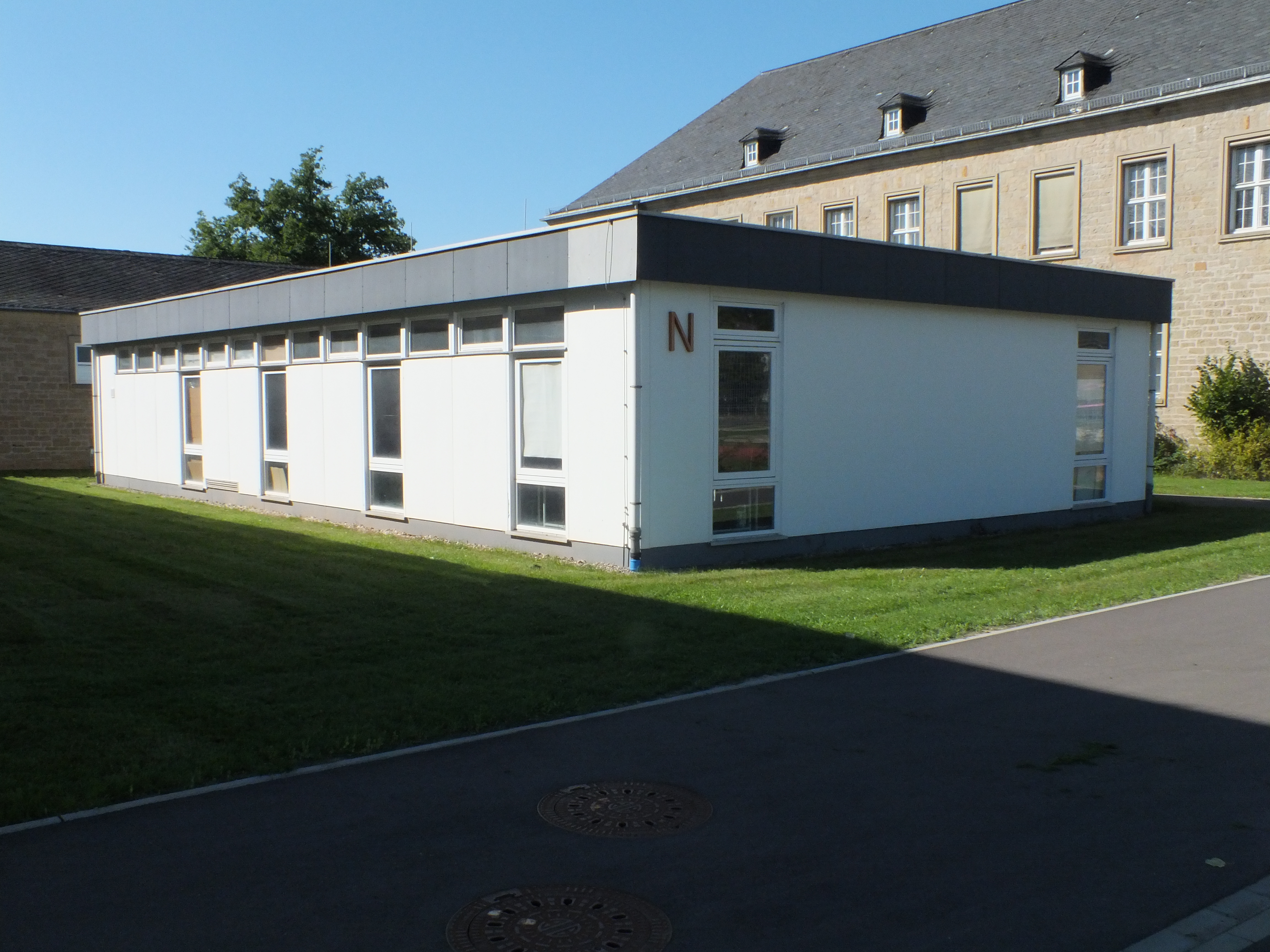
Buildings N and O - Department of Computer Science

The Department of Computer Science is composed of the subject areas of the departments of Computer Science and Therapy Science.

Bachelor's degree programmes

- Computer Science (B.Sc.)
- Computer Science - Digital Media and Games (B.Sc.)
- Computer Science - Secure and Mobile Systems (B.Sc.)
- Medical Informatics (B.Sc.)
- Occupational Therapy (B.Sc.)
- Occupational Therapy dual (B.Sc.)
- Speech and language therapy (B.Sc.)
- Speech and language therapy dual (B.Sc.)
- Physiotherapy - Technology and Therapy (B.Sc.)
- Physiotherapy - Technology and Therapy dual (B.Sc.)

Master's degree programmes

- Computer Science (M.Sc.)
- Artificial Intelligence and Data Science (M.Sc.)
- Business Information Systems - Information Management (M.Sc.) in cooperation with the Department of Business
- Computer Science (Master of Computer Science (M.C.Sc.), distance learning)

=== Department of Engineering ===
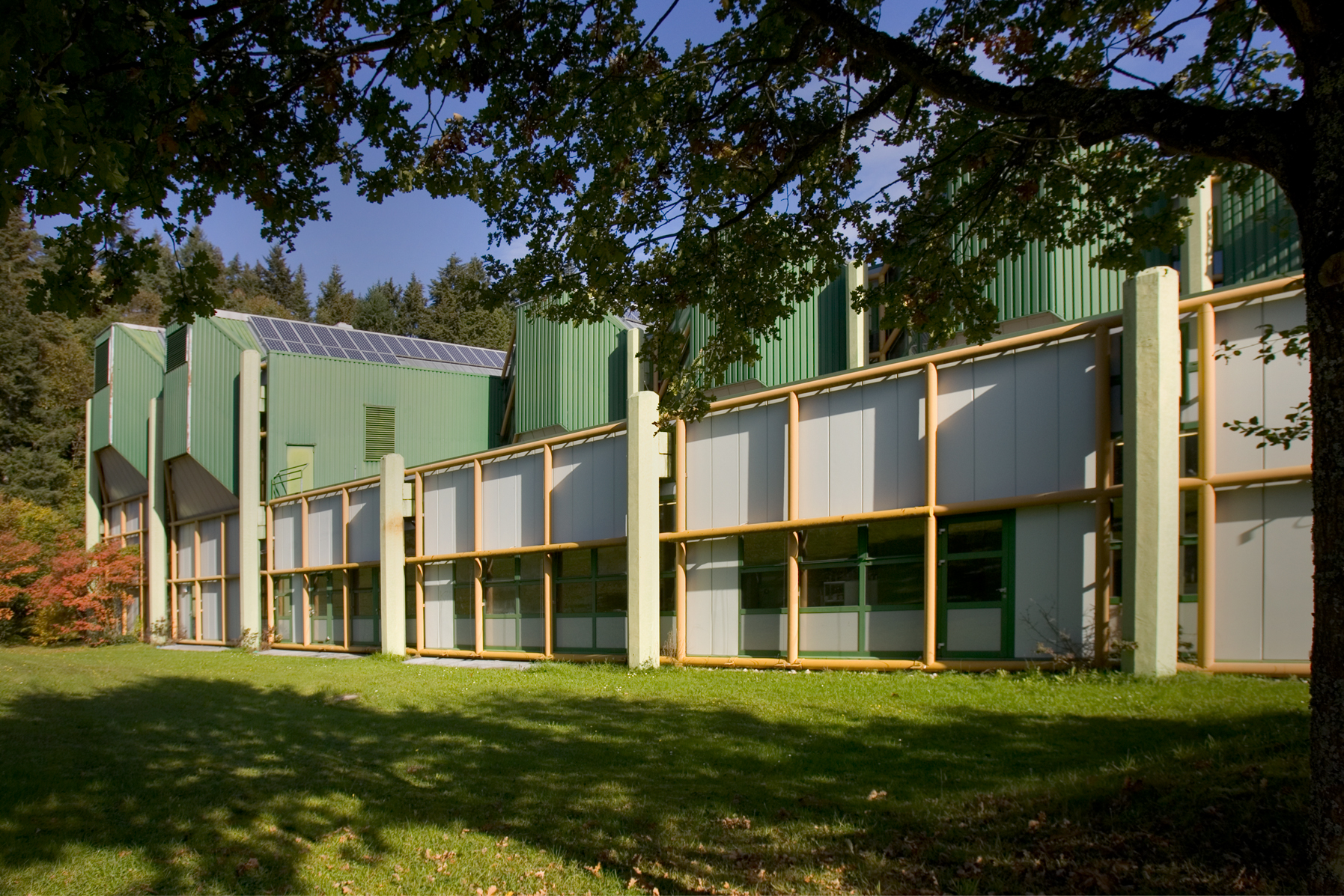
Machine hall - Department of Engineering

The Department of Engineering is composed of the subject areas of Mechanical Engineering and Electrical Engineering.

Bachelor's degree programmes

- Electrical Engineering (B.Eng.)
- Electrical Engineering dual (B.Eng.)
- Electromobility (B.Eng.)
- Automotive Engineering (B.Eng.)
- Internet of Things - Digital Automation (B.Eng.)
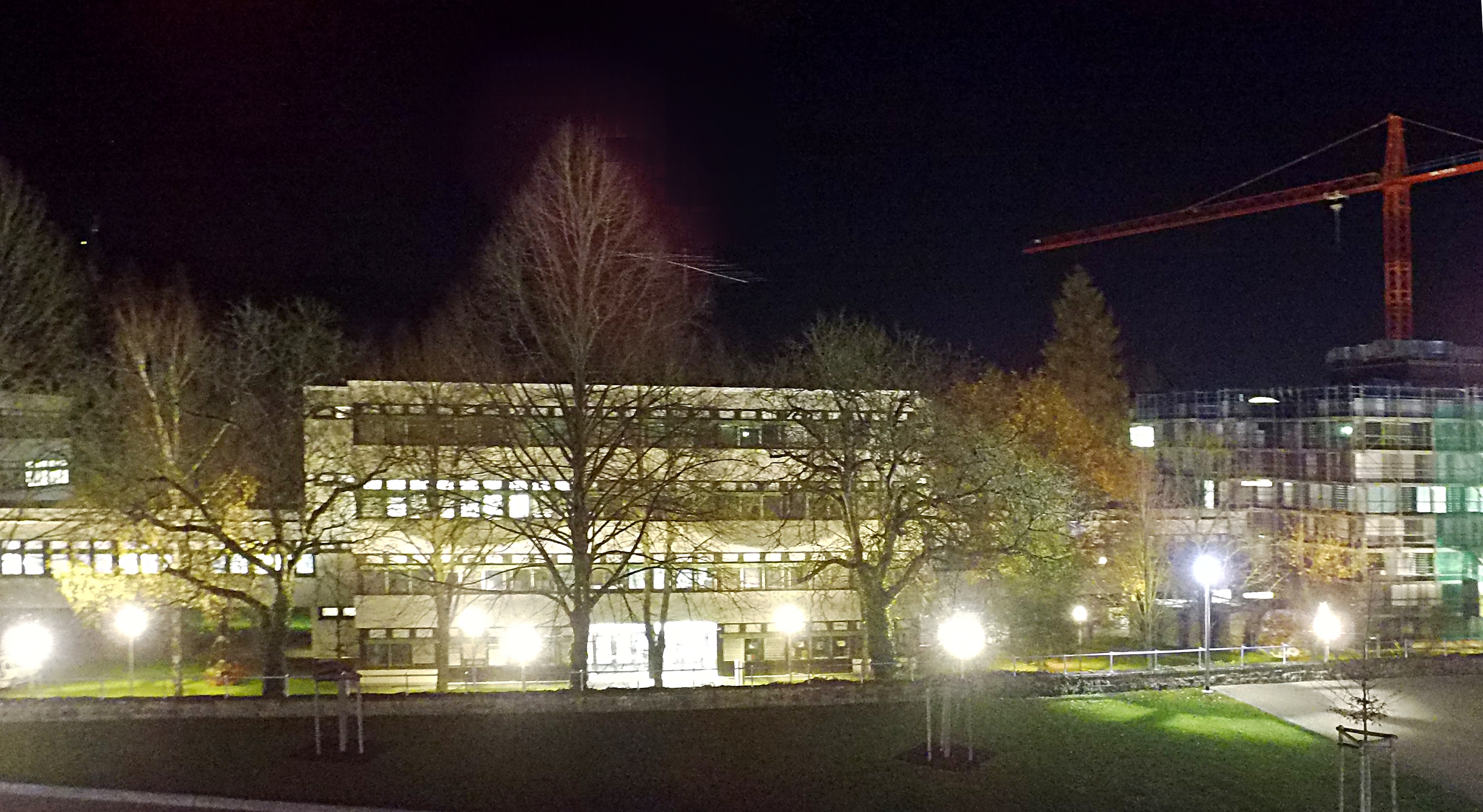
- Building B (centre) and C (right), December 2015
  Mechanical Engineering (B.Eng.)
- Mechanical Engineering dual (B.Eng.)
- Medical Engineering (B.Sc.)
- Safety Engineering (B.Eng.)
- Sports & Rehabilitation Technology (B.Eng.)
- Industrial Electrical Engineering and Management (B.Sc.) in cooperation with the Department of Business
- Industrial Engineering (B.Eng.)

Master's degree programmes

- Electrical Engineering (M.Sc.) with the specialisations: Automation and Energy, Information Technology and Electronics, Medical Technology
- Interdisciplinary Engineering (M.Sc.)
- Mechanical Engineering (M.Eng.) with the specialisations: General Mechanical Engineering and Automotive Engineering
- Industrial Engineering (M.Eng.)

=== Department of Business ===
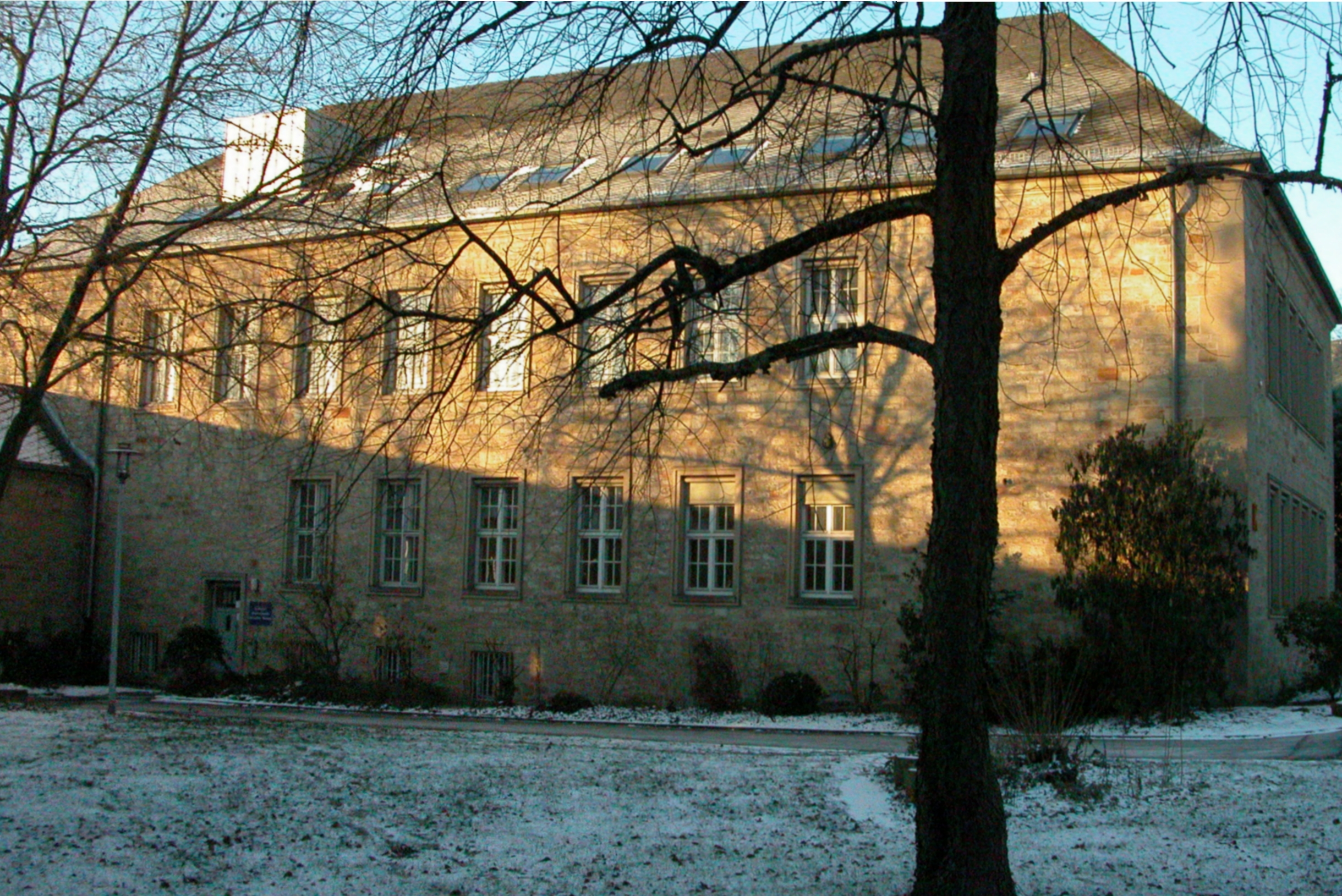
Building K - Department of Business

The Department of Business is composed of the subject areas of Business Administration, International Business, Business Information Systems and Business Psychology.

Bachelor's degree programmes

- Business Administration (B.A.)
- Business Administration dual (B.A.)
- International Business (B.A.)
- Business Information Systems (B.Sc.)
- Business Information Systems dual (B.Sc.)
- Industrial and Electrical Engineering (B.Sc.) in cooperation with the Department of Engineering
- Industrial and Electrical Engineering dual (B.Sc.)
- Business Psychology (B.Sc.)

Master's programmes

- Accounting and Audit (M.A.)
- Entrepreneurship (M.A.)
- Finance (M.A.)
- General Management (M.A.)
- Business Information Systems (M.A.) in cooperation with the Department of Computer Science

=== Departments at the Birkenfeld location ===
see Study at the Environmental Campus Birkenfeld

== Organisation and structure of Trier University of Applied Sciences ==
=== University Presidents ===
- 1996–1998: Klaus Zellner
- 1998–2004: Adelheid Ehmke
- 2004–2007: Bert Hofmann
- 2007–2013: Jörg Wallmeier
- 2013–2019: Norbert Kuhn
- since 2019: Dorit Schumann

=== Contact points ===
For students, the Study Service is the first point of contact. For employees, the Chancellor of Trier University of Applied Sciences is the first point of contact, while professors should address their concerns to their deans or to the University President.

== History ==
The Trier University of Applied Sciences originally developed from the Staatliche Ingenieurschule für das Bau- und Maschinenwesen Trier and the Werkkunstschule Trier. In 1971, it became a part of the Fachhochschule Rheinland-Pfalz, and became independent in 1996.
