= Riri Fitri Sari =

Indonesia computer engineering academic (born 1970)

Professor Riri Fitri Sari
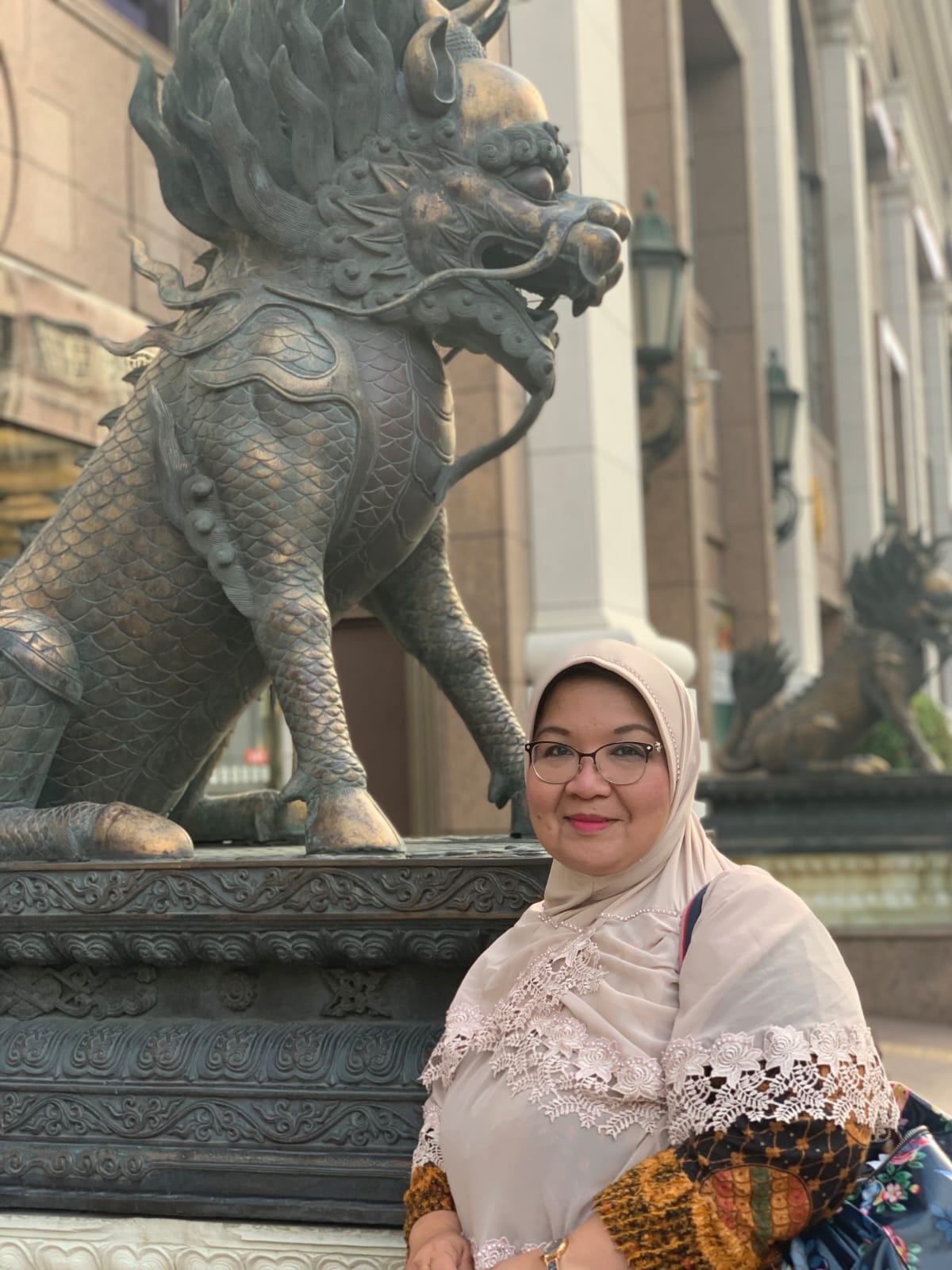
- Born: 7 July 1970 (age 56); Bukit Tinggi, West Sumatra, Indonesia
- Occupation: Professor of Computer Engineering
- Children: 3

Riri Fitri Sari (born 7 July 1970) is a professor of Computer Engineering at the Department of Electrical Engineering, Faculty of Engineering, University of Indonesia (UI). She was the CIO / Head of Information System Development and Services of the University of Indonesia (2006-2014).

== Education ==
In 1997, she received her MSc in Software Systems and Parallel Processing of Department of Computer Science, University of Sheffield, UK and subsequently a PhD from Leeds University, UK (2004).

== Teaching and organisational affiliations ==
She is Professor of Computer Engineering at the University of Indonesia, and was previously Chief Information Officer of the same university. She is currently actively teaching and researching in the field of Internet of Things, Computer Network, Protocol Engineering, and the implementation of Information and Communication Technology. Riri Fitri Sari as the chairperson of UI GreenMetric have jointly collaborated 2 kinds of online courses, i.e., International and Indonesia's universities courses. UI GreenMetric International Online course involved collaboration among 7 universities from 7 countries: Brazil, Colombia, Ecuador, Hungary, Indonesia, Tunisia, and The United Arab Emirates. Indonesian Online course involves collaboration of 17 universities to provide a course entitled "Best Practice of Sustainable Development Goals (SDGs) in Indonesia organised from 8 September – 22 December 2022.

Since 2010, she has been actively involved with University Ranking and has been the Chairperson of UI GreenMetric Ranking of World University.

Riri Fitri Sari was appointed as one of the Deputy President of ICMI (Indonesian Association of Muslim Intellectuals) in January 2022, under the leadership of Prof. Arif Satria. She coordinates ICMI's program in the field of Health, Empowerment of Women, Children, Youth and the Elderly.

On 10 November 2022, Riri Fitri Sari received the 2022 Habibie Prize from Indonesian National Research Agency (BRIN) and Human Resource Science and Technology Foundation (Yayasan SDM Iptek).

In 2022, Riri Fitri Sari delivered many Keynote Speeches at many of UI GreenMetric Events at various universities in Indonesia and overseas such as at Omnes Education (Inseec U) - Paris, COP-27 in Sharm El-Seikh, Sultan Ageng University Tirtayasa (Untirta) Serang, UIN Raden Fatah Palembang, UIN Raden Intan Lampung, Yogyakarta State University, Unsrat Manado, UMN Tangerang, Budi Luhur University Jakarta, etc. Apart from that, visits to GreenMetric participating universities such as Oxford University, Nottingham Trent University, Warwick University, Al Azhar University in Egypt, 6 October University Cairo, and others in November 2022.

In 2022, Riri Fitri Sari received several prestigious awards, including the Habibie Prize in Engineering, the Encouragement Award from the Hitachi Global Foundation Asia Innovation Award, and the Role Model of Women in Cyber Security at the Indonesia Women in Cyber Security (IWCS) Summit.

== Poetry ==
On December 24, 2022, Riri Fitri Sari as the initiator of the Poetry Reading Society of Indonesia (PRSI), held an Online Poetry Reading event with the theme "Borderless Poetry". This event invites ambassadors of the Republic of Indonesia who are on duty in various countries, including Argentina, Czech, India, Kazakhstan, Cuba, Pakistan, and Thailand. This event also invited several former ambassadors and professors, active and retired lecturers, and alumni of the University of Indonesia. In November 2022, she jointly organised a performance of more than 30 poetry readers, conducted at the Makara Art Center of the University of Indonesia.

== Personal life ==
From her marriage to Dr. Ir. Adi Kusno Sambowo, she has three daughters, Almira, Naufalia, and Laura Sambowo. She was the eldest child of the couple Drs Mursyd AM MBA and Dra. Azizah Etek MA.

== Awards ==
- 2022: Habibie Prize in the Field of Engineering Science, awarded by the National Research and Innovation Agency.
- 2022: Encouragement Award from Hitachi Global Foundation Asia Innovation Award.
- 2022: Role Model of Women in Cyber Security, Indonesia Women in Cyber Security.
- 2021: IEEE R10 Personality of the Month.
- 2017: 72 Icon Prestasi Pancasila, BPIP RI.
- 2015: Upakara Dayaning Bawono Award, Universitas Negeri Semarang.
- 2015: KAZNU Honorary Professor, Kazakhstan.
- 2014: KAZNU 80th anniversary Medal of Excellent Service in Education, Kazakhstan.
- 2013: Indi Women Technologist, Kartini Award, PT Telkom.
- 2012: Recipient of the IEEE Region 10 WIE Most Inspiring Engineer Award in Calcutta, India.
- 2012: Indonesia Inspiring Youth and Women Award from PT Indosat.
- 2009: The Most Outstanding Lecturer of Indonesia the Ministry of Higher Education (Dikti – Depdiknas).
