= Katrin Werner =

German politician

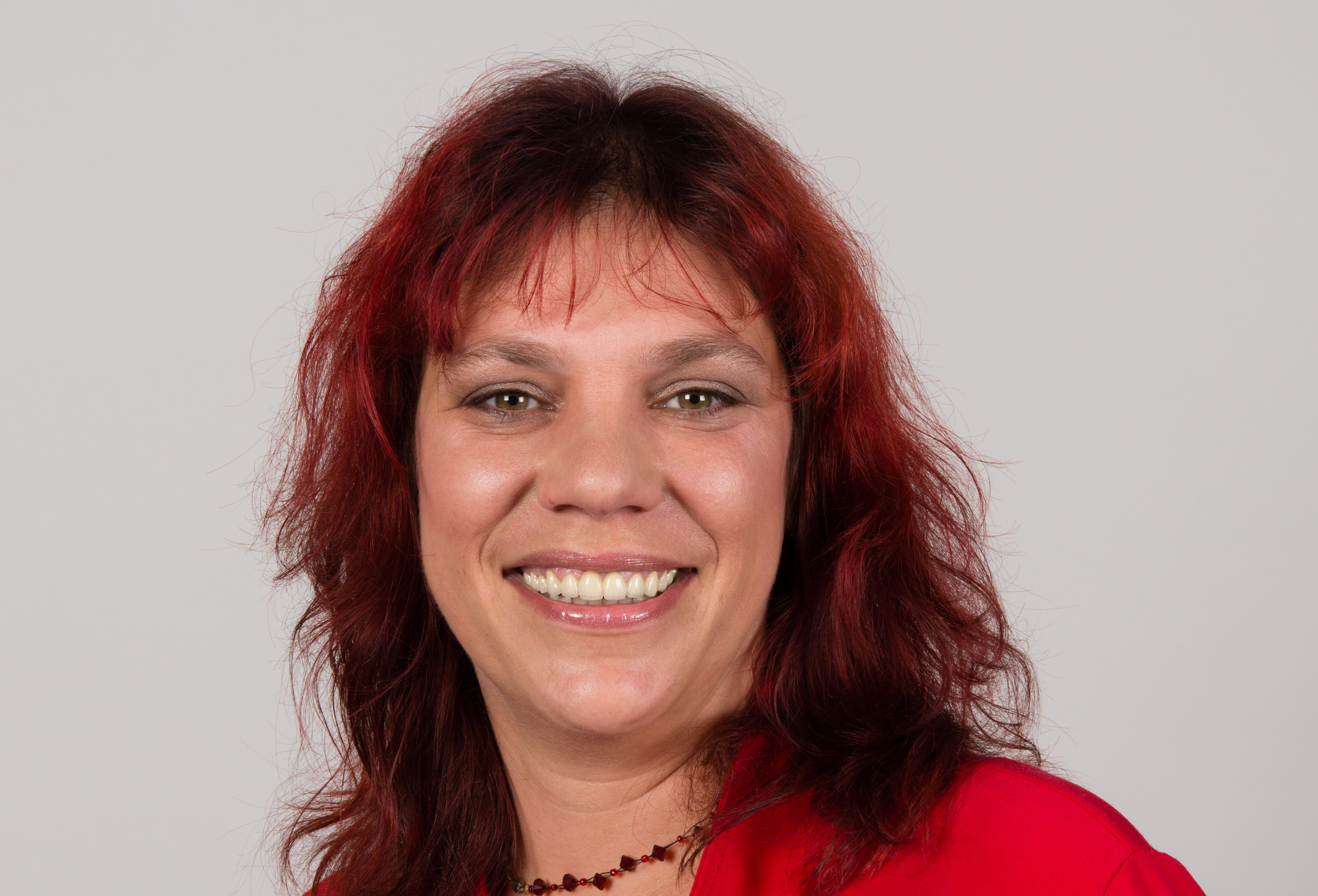
- Katrin Werner in 2014

Member of the Bundestag
- Incumbent
- Assumed office 2009

Personal details
- Born: 25 May 1973 (age 52) Berlin, West Germany (now Germany)
- Party: The Left
- Children: 1

Katrin Werner (born 25 May 1973) is a German politician who represents The Left. She served as a member of the Bundestag from the state of Rhineland-Palatinate from 2009 to 2021.

== Life ==
Born in Berlin, Werner became a member of the Bundestag after the 2009 German federal election. She is a member of the Committee for Family, Senior Citizens, Women and Youth.
