= Environmental Campus Birkenfeld =

Coordinates: 49°36′28″N 7°10′09″E

- Motto: "Umwelt macht Karriere"
- Type: Public
- Established: 1996
- President: Norbert Kuhn; President of the University of Applied Sciences Trier
- Academic staff: 289
- Students: 1,800
- Location: Birkenfeld, Rhineland-Palatinate, Germany
- Campus: Urban
- Website: umwelt-campus.de

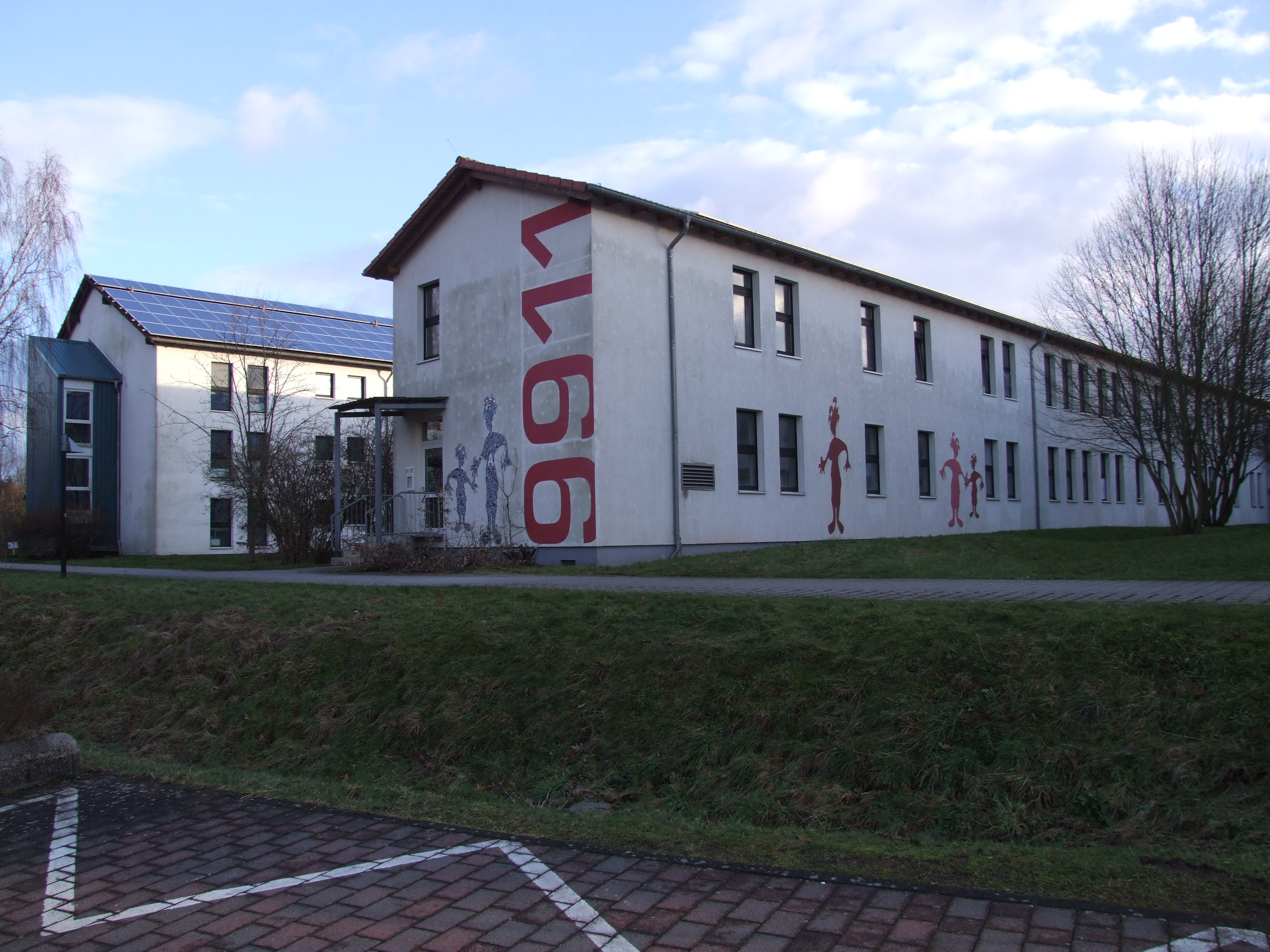
Environmental Campus Birkenfeld

The Environmental Campus Birkenfeld (ECB) (German: Umwelt-Campus Birkenfeld (UCB)) is a branch of the Hochschule Trier in the state of Rhineland-Palatinate, Germany. It is close to the small town of Birkenfeld in Rhineland-Palatinate, close to the border of Saarland, Luxembourg, Belgium and France. There are 1,800 students enrolled in two departments. There are a total of 59 professors teaching in both departments ( Environmental Planning / Environmental Technology (Umweltplanung und -technik) and Environment Business / Environment Law (Umweltwirtschaft und -recht)).

Since the beginning of the academic year in October 2005, only bachelor and master students are being accepted as part of the Bologna process.

ECB is structured as a residential campus. It offers education, housing and employment all in one location (this is very rare in Germany). There are eight residential structures that provide housing for 777 students. As is characteristic of a university of applied sciences, the campus is structured so that the students have the opportunity to receive an early introduction to the sciences. Students are encouraged to take part in the research projects underway on campus. Some programs are even designed solely for student participation.

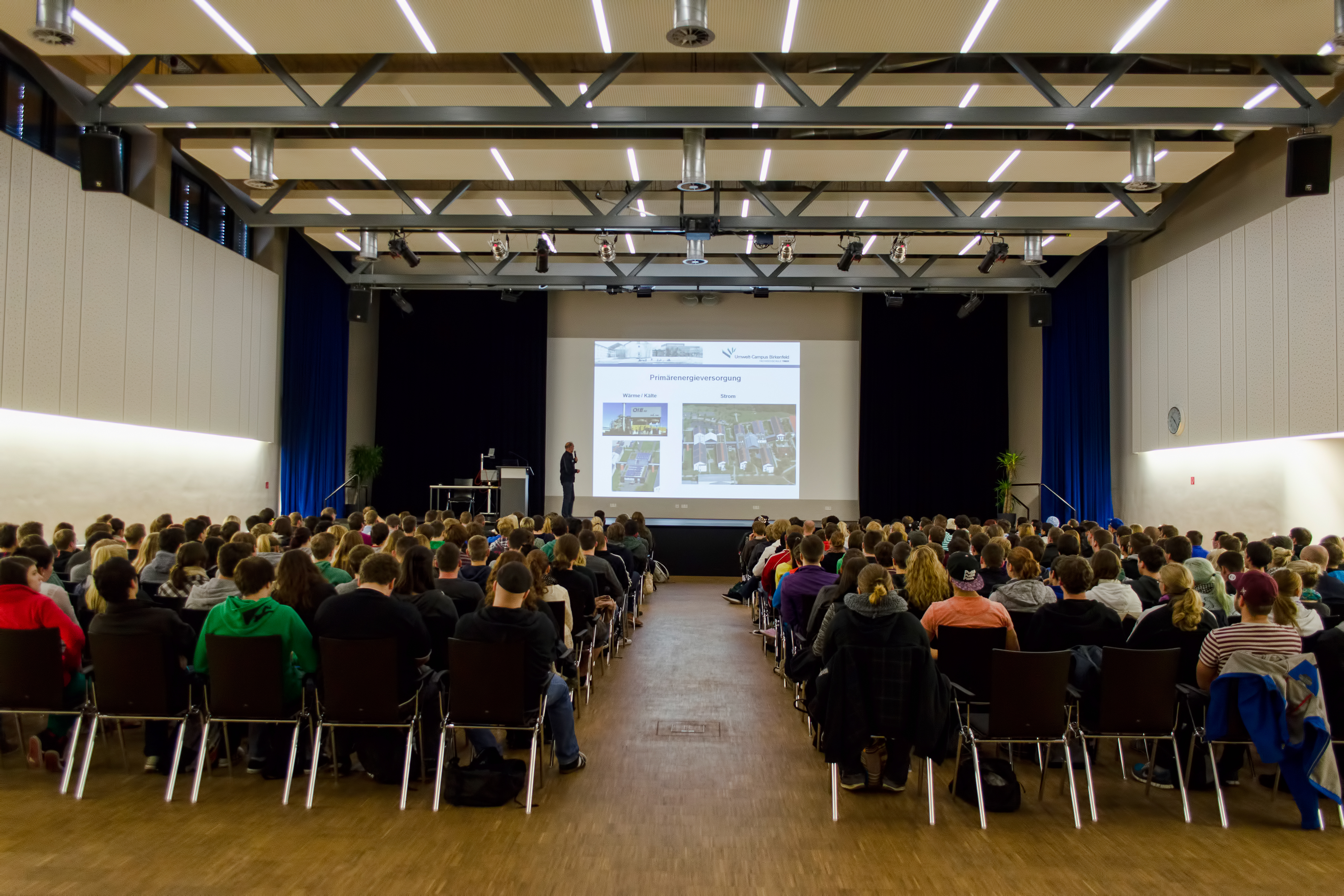
Large hall in the communication building

One such specialized project is the traveling university. Students have the opportunity to travel to one of a selection of foreign countries to work on a project for a period of two weeks. Typical projects involve renewable energy sources and have been conducted in places as diverse as Opole (Poland) and Kunming (China). Similar future projects will be located in Brazil.

Incidentally, ECB is the only University in Germany that uses Renewable Energy Sources to generate heat.

== History ==
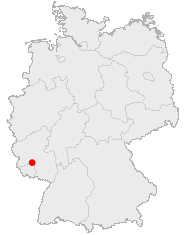
Location of ECB in Germany

=== US Army hospital (1952-1994) ===
ECB has a very short history compared with other universities across the globe, however it is just as intriguing. The campus area was originally a US Army hospital that was built as a contingency in the event of a 3rd world war. Fortunately, it was never needed.

Near this location (Baumholder) was the 98th General Hospital, established in Neubrücke (a small town near Birkenfeld). The hospital had an area of 440,000 square metres when it opened in 1952. It had 1,000 beds as well as various medical specialty sections: Surgery, dental medicine, orthopedics, radiology, rehabilitation, eye medicine and others. The hospital was open through the 1970s and was closed in 1984 due to operational expenses.

In 1994 the US Army finally gave up on the hospital ever being needed and by 1996 the complex was empty.

=== Environmental campus (since 1996) ===
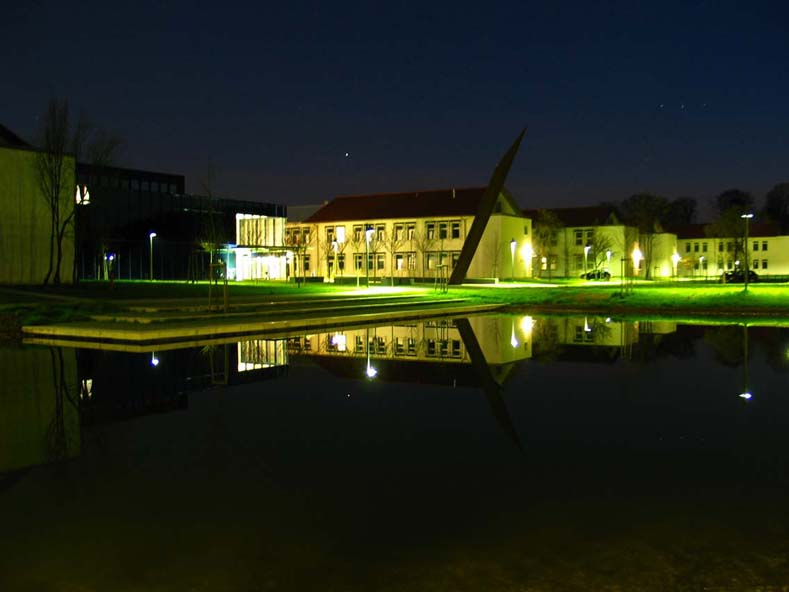
Central New Building in the center of the campus at night.

In 1996 the ECB was born. The first step was undertaken by the Landrat (county commissioner) of the Landkreis Birkenfeld (Birkenfeld County) Dr. Ernst Theilen. The academic founders were three professors; Prof. Dr. Michael Eulenstein, Prof. Dr.-Ing. Hanns Köhler and Prof. Dr. Marott Bronder. They offered the first courses taught at ECB.

At first, there was a lot of construction underway on campus. The final phase of construction (Central new building) was completed in 2000.

== Study ==
The attractive features of ECB are the modern methods of teaching, the small class sizes and the international contacts. There are now 2,500 students enrolled from beginning of winter semester 2005. There are 14 Bachelor, 4 Dual Bachelor and 12 Master's degree programs offered.

=== Bachelor ===
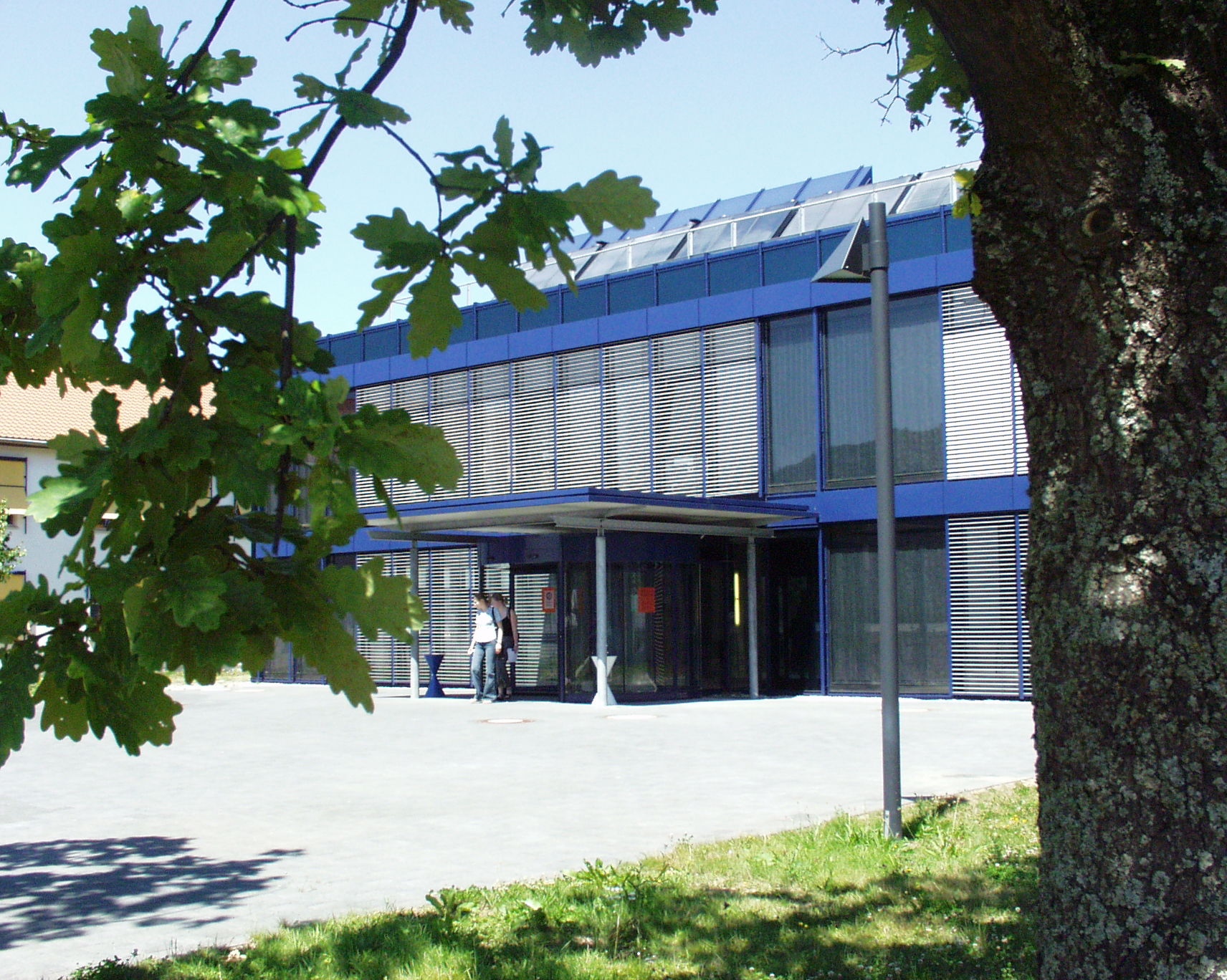
Central New Building in the center of the campus.

degrees offered

- Applied Computer Science (Bachelor of Science)
- Bioprocess, Environmental and Process Engineering (Bachelor of Engineering)
- Bio- and Pharmaceutical Engineering (Bachelor of Science)
- Renewable Energy (Bachelor of Science)
- Mechanical Engineering: Product Development and Technical Planning (Bachelor of Engineering)
- Media Computer Science (Bachelor of Science)
- Engineering Physics (Bachelor of Engineering)
- Environmental Economics and Business Management (Bachelor of Arts)
- Environmental and Business Computer Science (Bachelor of Science)
- Industrial Engineering/Environmental Planning (Bachelor of Science)
- Economic and Environmental Law (LL. B.)
- Study Program "Environment and Technology"
- Study Semester "Principles of Sustainable Business"
- Sustainable Business and Technology (Bachelor of Engineering)

The course of study for these degrees differ slightly from those offered in the United States, however, the German accreditation agency AQUAS will accept either.

=== Dual Bachelor's Degree ===
- Sustainable Resource Management (Bachelor of Arts)
- Production Technology (Bachelor of Engineering)
- Bio- and Pharmaceutical Engineering (Bachelor of Science)
- Environmental and Business Computer Science (Bachelor of Science)

=== Masters ===
degrees offered

- Applied Computer Science (Master of Science)
- Bioprocess and Process Engineering (Master of Science)
- Business Administration and Engineering (Master of Science)
- Digital Product Development: Mechanical Engineering (Master of Engineering)
- International Material Flow Management (Master of Science)
- International Material Flow Management (Master of Engineering)
- Insolvency and Reorganisation Law (LL. M.)
- Media Computer Science (Master of Science)
- Environmental and Business Economics (Master of Arts)
- Environmental Energy Technology (Master of Science)
- Business and Energy Law (LL. M.)
- Sustainable Change (Master of Arts)

== Research ==
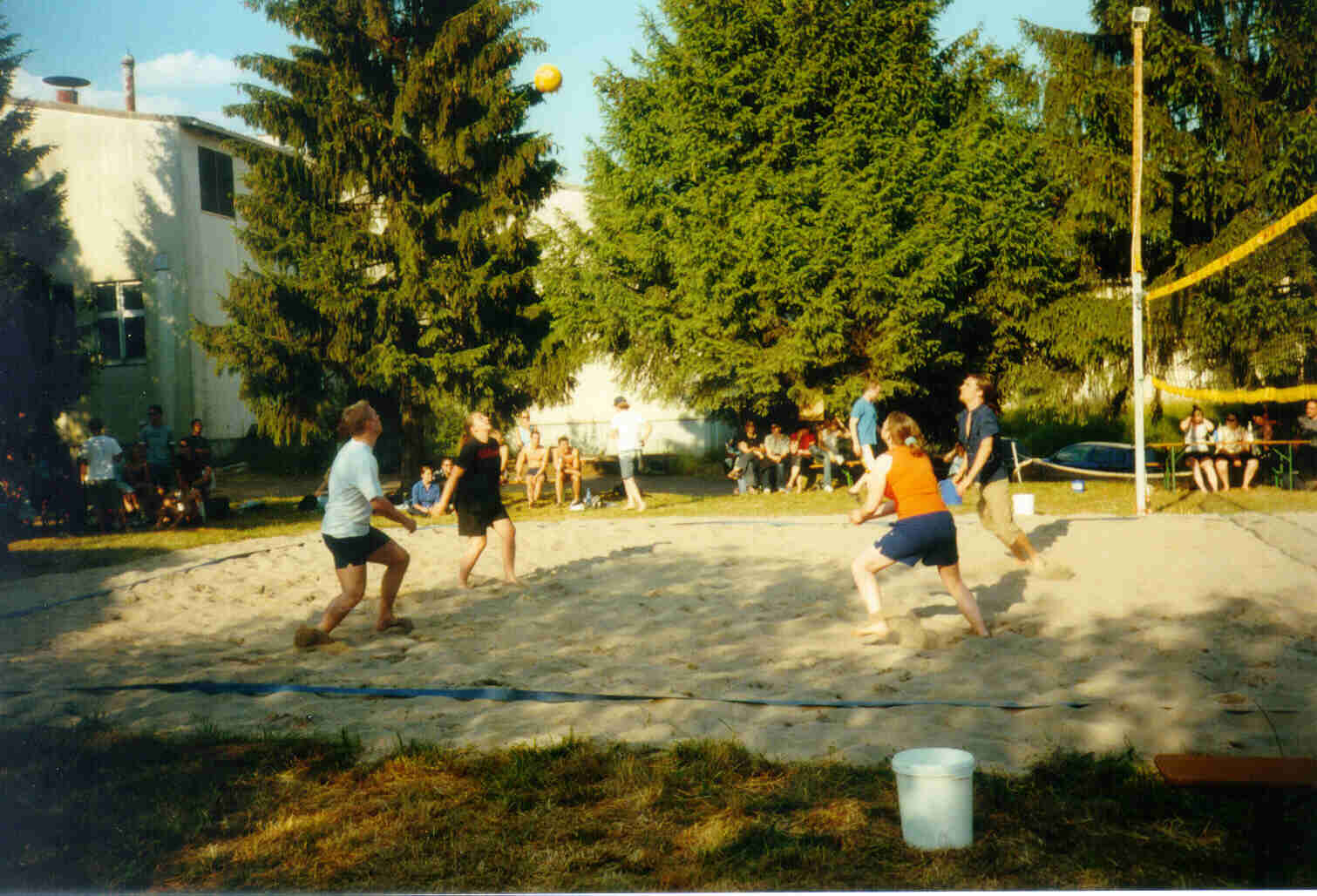
Annual beach volleyball tournament.

Although the environmental campus has only existed since 1996, it has already launched a set of institutes and competency centers built around the scientific curriculum. Some of these are already internationally recognized.

=== Institutes ===
- IfaS Institut für angewandtes Stoffstrommanagement (Institute for Applied Material Flow Management)
- IBT Institut für Betriebs- und Technologiemanagement (Institute for Business and Technology Management)
- ISS (Institute for Software Systems)
- IMIP Institute for Micro Process Engineering and Particle Technology
- ZBF Zentrum für Bodenschutz and Flächenhaushaltspolitik (Centre for Soil Conservation and Territorial Budgetary Policies)
- BAQI Birkenfelder Institut für Ausbildung und Qualitätssicherung im Insolvenzwesen (Birkenfeld Institute for Training and Quality Management in Insolvency Management)
- IBioPD Institut für biotechnisches Prozessdesign (Institute for Biotechnical Process Design)
- IREK Institut für das Recht der Erneuerbaren Energien, Energieeffizienzrecht und Klimaschutzrecht (Institute for Renewable Energy Law, Energy Efficiency Law and Climate Protection Law)

=== Competence Centers ===
- Fuel Cell Centre Rhineland-Palatinate
- Competence Centre 'Intelligent microstructured Particles' (KIMP)
- Competence Centre eGovernment & Environment
- Umberto Competence Center Birkenfeld (UCC)
- Centre for Environmental Communication at the ECB (ZUKUC)

== Partner universities ==
- Brazil: Universidade Positivo, Instituto Federal de Goiás, Instituto Federal Sul-rio-grandense
- Chile: Universidad Austral de Chile
- China: Lanzhou University, Guizhou University, Foshan University, Yantai University, Liaoning Shihua University
- Ghana: Regent University
- Israel: Ben-Gurion University of the Negev, Holon Institute of Technology, University and Shenkar - Engineering. Design. Art.
- Japan: Ritsumeikan Asia Pacific University
- Jordan: German Jordanian University
- Kazakhstan: Suleyman Demirel University
- Colombia: Universidad EIA, Universidad Autónoma de Occidente
- South Korea: Ajou University
- Morocco: Al Akhawayn University
- Mexico: Universidad Panamericana (UP)
- Russia: Voronezh Institute of High Technologies
- Serbia: University of Novi Sad
- Taiwan: National Taipei University of Technology
- Thailand: Ramkhamhaeng University
- United States: New College of Florida, Warren Wilson College, Clemson University, Lander University, University of California, Alliant International University San Diego, Midwestern State University
- Cyprus: Eastern Mediterranean University
