= Franz Peter Basten =

German politician

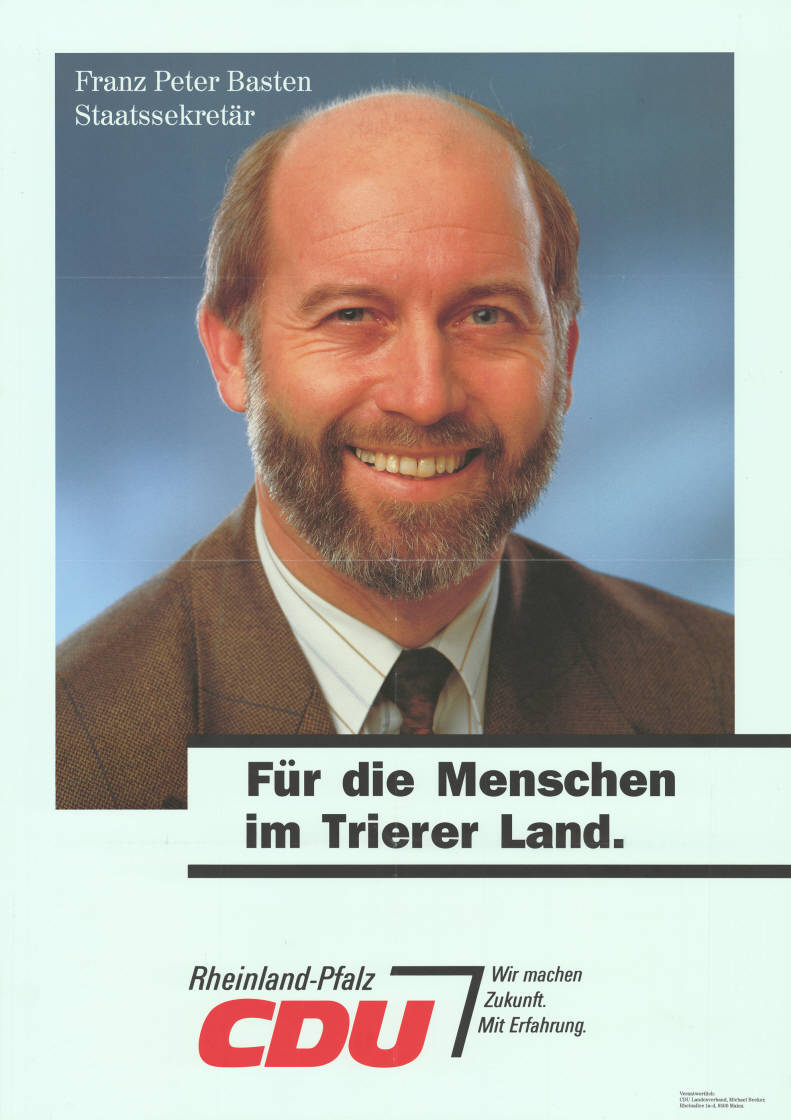
- Election poster from Basten (1991)

Member of the Bundestag
- In office 1994–1998

Personal details
- Born: 22 October 1944 (age 81) Trier, West Germany
- Party: CDU

Franz Peter Basten (born 22 August 1944) is a German politician (CDU) and former member of the German Bundestag.

== Life ==
Franz Peter Basten studied law in Freiburg im Breisgau, Geneva and Mainz from 1965 to 1971. In 1974 he passed the second state examination in law and subsequently worked as a personal assistant to the Minister of Economics and Transport of Rhineland-Palatinate. He is married and has two children.

Basten was a member of the Rhineland-Palatinate state parliament from 1979 to 1985, briefly in 1987 and from 1991 to 1994. From 18 June 1985 to 31 May 1988, he was State Secretary in the Ministry of the Interior, then State Secretary in the Ministry of Economics and Transport of Rhineland-Palatinate until 1991.

From November 10, 1994 to October 26, 1998, Basten was a member of the German Bundestag for one legislative period.
