= Bernhard Kaster =

German politician (born 1957)

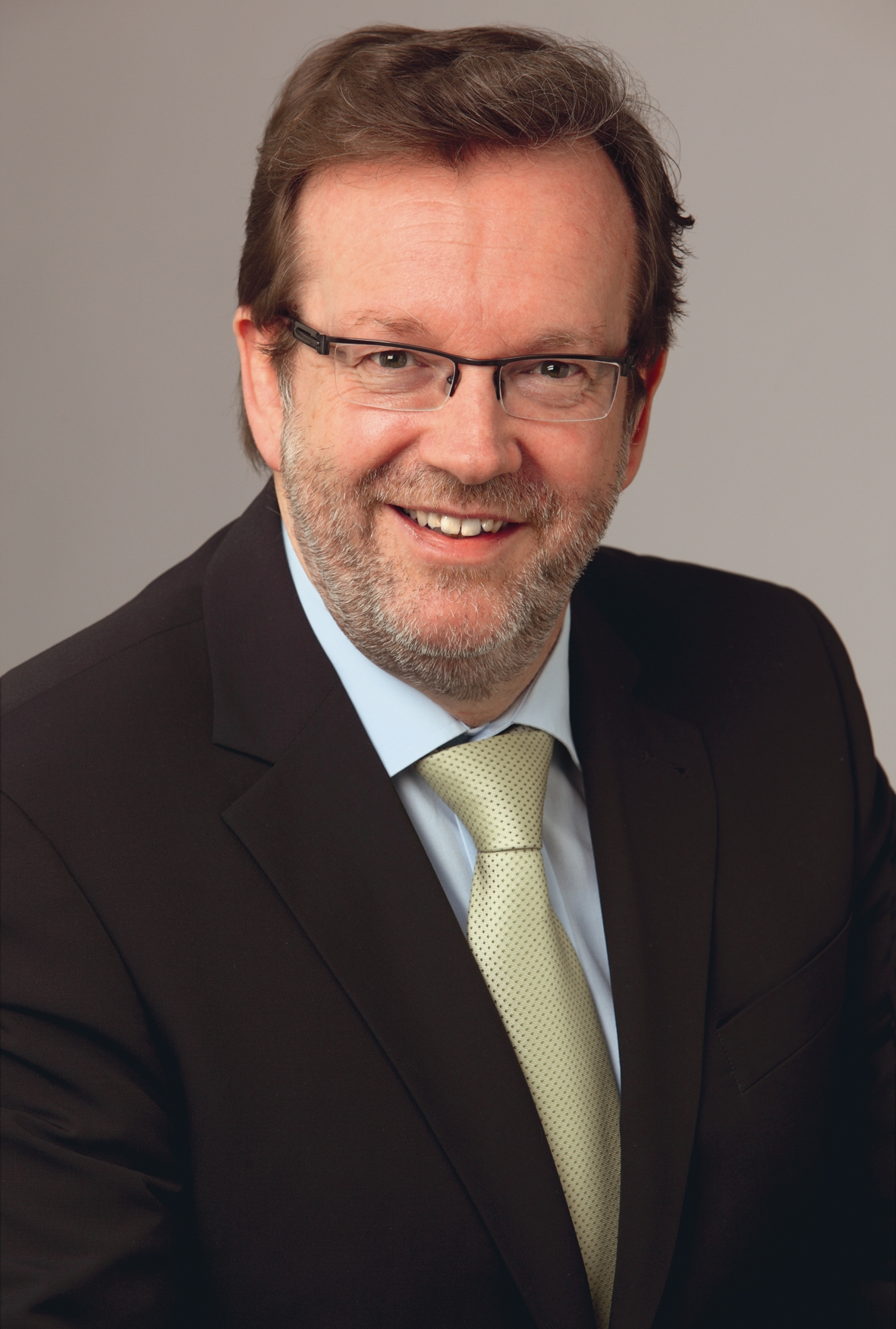
- Kaster in 2009

Bundestag
- In office 2002–2017

Personal details
- Born: 1 November 1957 (age 68) Trier
- Party: Christian Democratic Union

Bernhard Kaster (born 1 November 1957 in Trier) is a German politician serving as a member of the Bundestag from 2002 to 2017. From 1997 to 2002 Kaster was mayor of Trier-Land. Kaster is married.
