= 2021–22 Liga 1 (Indonesia) =

Liga 1
- Season: 2021–22
- Dates: 27 August 2021 – 31 March 2022
- Champions: Bali United; 2nd Liga 1 title 2nd Indonesian title
- Relegated: Persipura; Persela; Persiraja
- 2022 AFC Cup: Bali United; PSM
- Matches: 306
- Goals: 735 (2.4 per match)
- Top goalscorer: Ilija Spasojević (23 goals)
- Biggest home win: Bali United 5–0 Persiraja (30 November 2021); Persikabo 1973 5–0 Persiraja (9 December 2021)
- Biggest away win: Persiraja 0–5 Persikabo 1973 (19 March 2022)
- Highest scoring: Persik 4–2 Persipura (21 October 2021); Persib 4–2 PSS (22 October 2021); Persikabo 1973 4–2 Persela (27 November 2021); Persebaya 3–3 Persija (14 February 2022); Persela 2–4 Barito Putera (18 February 2022); Madura United 3–3 Barito Putera (9 March 2022); PSIS 3–3 Persita (20 March 2022); Persipura 4–2 PSS (20 March 2022)
- Longest winning run: 9 matches Bali United
- Longest unbeaten run: 23 matches Arema
- Longest winless run: 25 matches Persela
- Longest losing run: 6 matches Persipura

The 2021–22 Liga 1, also known as BRI Liga 1 for sponsorship reasons, was the 5th season of Liga 1 under its current name and the 12th season of the top-flight Indonesian professional league for association football clubs since its establishment in 2008. The season started on 27 August 2021. Bali United were the defending champions from the 2019 season after the 2020 season was abandoned and declared void after three matches due to the COVID-19 pandemic.

On 25 March 2022, Bali United succeeded in defending their title for the second consecutive season, after second-placed Persib drew against Persik, giving Bali United a 4-point lead with only one game left.

== Effects of the COVID-19 pandemic ==
=== Cancellation of the 2020 season ===
PSSI canceled the 2020 Liga 1 season after putting it under suspension twice due to the COVID-19 pandemic. The first suspension was announced after finishing matchday three on 15 March 2020, two weeks after the government announced the first cases of COVID-19 in Indonesia. The initial suspension was only for two weeks but it was extended to 29 May 2020. However, the government blocked every attempt to resume the competition. On 27 June 2020, PSSI issued a decree to continue Liga 1 from October 2020.

After failing to obtain government and police permissions for the umpteenth time, PSSI on 29 September 2020 announced the second postponement of the 2020 season of Liga 1 and Liga 2. This time the initial suspension had a one-month period. After the end date was reached, PSSI on 29 October 2020 declared the 2020 football seasons could not be held in 2020. There was an attempt to resume the 2020 season in 2021. However, on 15 January 2021, PSSI decided to cancel the 2020 season of all football competitions and declared them void.

=== 2021 season plans ===
PSSI and PT LIB plan to hold the 2021 season in coordination with the Indonesian Police and other state agencies despite the ongoing COVID-19 pandemic in Indonesia, the country with the most COVID-19 cases in Southeast Asia. The original plan was to hold it from 11 June 2021 and finish on 11 March 2022. After months of debate, PSSI decided against eliminating the relegation and promotion system, an option that many cash-strapped clubs proposed. PSSI also changed the starting date to early July 2021. COVID-19 restrictions in many cities on Java island delayed the commencement to late August 2021.

In order to obtain government permission, PSSI and PT LIB themselves had to incorporate various COVID-19 restrictions for the 2021 season, including disallowing fans to be inside or outside the stadium before, during, and after matches. Only a maximum of 299 people, including players, coaches, team officials, security personnel, and special guests, are allowed to enter the stadium. In addition, all entrants are required to be tested, pass temperature checks, wear masks, and follow other health protocols. All players also must be fully vaccinated to be eligible to play. All matches are expected to be played on main island of Java to reduce contagion risks from air travel, leading to protests from non-Java teams that must relocate their base to a Java city.

As a simulation for the 2021 season, PSSI held the 2021 Menpora Cup as a pre-season tournament for the Liga 1 teams. The event was held as a reference in implementing health protocols so that government and police officials become convinced that professional football matches would not turn into super-spreader events.

=== 2021 format ===
Cognizant of the fluctuating situation caused by the COVID-19 pandemic, PSSI and PT LIB decided the league format will be divided into six series that consider the infection levels across Java island. Each series will cover 45-54 matches (five to six matchdays) played in multiple designated regions to ensure no club will play in their home grounds. The venues can change days ahead of schedule if certain regions are deemed as COVID-19 red zones or violations to COVID-19 rules occurred at a specific stadium.

The first series (six matchdays) will be held in the provinces of Banten, West Java, and DKI Jakarta with six stadiums (Benteng Taruna Stadium, Pakansari Stadium, Patriot Stadium (Indonesia), Wibawa Mukti Stadium, Gelora Bandung Lautan Api Stadium and Jalak Harupat Stadium). The second series is planned to be held in the provinces Central Java and Special Region of Yogyakarta with five stadiums (Jatidiri Stadium, Citarum Stadium, Manahan Stadium, Maguwoharjo Stadium and Sultan Agung Stadium). The third series is planned to entirely run in East Java province but in different nine stadiums (Gelora Bung Tomo Stadium, Gelora 10 November Stadium, Kanjuruhan Stadium, Gajayana Stadium, Surajaya Stadium, Petrokimia Stadium, Gelora Delta Stadium, Brawijaya Stadium, Gelora Bangkalan Stadium).

The fourth and fifth series will be held in Bali with limited supporters in four stadiums (Kapten I Wayan Dipta Stadium (Gianyar), Ngurah Rai Stadium (Denpasar), Kompyang Sujana Stadium (Denpasar), and Samudra Stadium (Badung)), before the sixth and last series is planned to take place at venues in the kick-off series in the provinces of Banten, West Java, and DKI Jakarta.

== Teams ==
Eighteen teams are competing in the league – all teams retained from the scrapped 2020 season.

=== Name changes ===
- In early 2020, TIRA-Persikabo changed its name to Persikabo 1973.
- In late 2020, Bhayangkara relocated to Surakarta from Jakarta and changed its name to Bhayangkara Solo. However, the changes were annulled, according to PSSI in its 2021 annual congress.

=== Stadiums and locations ===
Original locations of the 2021 Liga 1 teams

Team	Location	Stadium	Capacity
Arema	Malang	Kanjuruhan	42,449
Bali United	Gianyar	Kapten I Wayan Dipta	23,081
Barito Putera	Martapura	Demang Lehman (Note: Barito Putera played their home matches at Demang Lehman due to the renovation of their stadium at May 17th.)	15,000
Bhayangkara	Surakarta	Manahan	20,000
Borneo	Samarinda	Segiri	16,000
Madura United	Pamekasan	Gelora Madura	15,000
Persebaya	Surabaya	Gelora Bung Tomo	45,134
Persela	Lamongan	Surajaya	16,000
Persib	Bandung	Si Jalak Harupat	27,000
Persija	Jakarta	Gelora Bung Karno (Note: Persija also registered Patriot Candrabhaga as their home stadium.)	77,193
Persik	Kediri	Brawijaya	20,000
Persikabo 1973	Bogor	Pakansari	30,000
Persipura	Jayapura	Mandala	30,000
Persiraja	Banda Aceh	Harapan Bangsa	45,000
Persita	Tangerang	Indomilk Arena	30,000
PSIS	Semarang	Citarum (Note: PSIS will play their home matches at Citarum because the rebuilding of their stadium at Jatidiri isn't finished yet. They also registered Moch. Soebroto and Kebondalem.)	7,000
PSM	Makassar	Andi Mattalatta	15,000
PSS	Sleman	Maguwoharjo	31,700

=== Personnel and kits ===
Note: Flags indicate national team as has been defined under FIFA eligibility rules. Players and coaches may hold more than one non-FIFA nationality.

Team	Head coach	Captain	Kit manufacturer	Shirt Sponsor(s)
Arema	(Portugal) Eduardo Almeida	(Indonesia) Johan Alfarizi	(Indonesia) SEA	Vidio^{1}, The Legion Nutrition^{1}, MS Glow for Men^{1}, Indomie^{1}, Panca Persada Medika^{2}, Torabika Duo^{3}
Bali United	(Brazil) Stefano Cugurra	(Indonesia) Fadil Sausu	(Indonesia) Mills	Indofood^{1}, Smartfren^{1}, Wuling^{1}, Buana Capital^{1}, YCAB Foundation^{1}, AdaKami^{1}, Alderon^{1}, OVO^{1}, KukuBima Ener-G!^{1}, Bank Ina^{1}, Indomie^{2}, Intersport^{2}, CBN Fiber^{2}, MS Glow for Men^{3}, Vidio^{3}
Barito Putera	(Indonesia) Rahmad Darmawan	(Indonesia) Rizky Pora	(Indonesia) Made by club	Hasnur Group^{1}, Maming Enam Sembilan^{1}
Bhayangkara	(Northern Ireland) Paul Munster	(Indonesia) Awan Setho	(Indonesia) Mills	BNI^{1}, Envi^{1}, Gojek^{2}, Go-Pay^{2}, Viral Blast Global^{2}, Jasa Raharja^{3}, Extra Joss^{3}
Borneo	(Indonesia) Ahmad Amiruddin (caretaker)	(Uzbekistan) Javlon Guseynov	(Indonesia) Etams	Ansaf^{1}, CRK^{1}, Mr. Cuanisasi^{1}, Extra Joss^{2}, Energi Borneo Timur^{3}
Madura United	(Brazil) Fábio Lefundes	(Indonesia) Fachrudin Aryanto	(Indonesia) XTen	Integra Group^{1}, Kangean Energy Indonesia^{1}, KukuBima Ener-G!^{1}, POJUR^{1}, Viral Blast Global^{2}
Persebaya	(Indonesia) Aji Santoso	(Indonesia) Rachmat Irianto	(Indonesia) AZA	Kapal Api^{1}, Vidio^{1}, Extra Joss^{1}, Pansaka^{1}, Go-Pay^{2}, Universitas Muhammadiyah Surabaya^{2}, MPM Honda Distributor^{3}, The Legion Nutrition^{3}
Persela	Vacant	(Indonesia) Dwi Kuswanto	(Indonesia) Adhoc	So Nice^{1}, BeliKopi^{1}, Extra Joss^{2}
Persib	(Netherlands) Robert Alberts	(Indonesia) Supardi Nasir	(Indonesia) Sportama	Indofood^{1}, Mobil^{1}, Permata Bank Syariah^{1}, Halodoc^{1}, Pria Punya Selera^{1}, Intersport^{1}, Kopi ABC^{2}, Envi^{3}, Didimax^{3}, Indomie^{3}
Persija	(Indonesia) Sudirman	(Indonesia) Andritany Ardhiyasa	(Indonesia) Juara	Amman Mineral^{1}, KukuBima Ener-G! C-1000^{1}, Indomie^{1}, Amindo Prima Sejahtera^{1}, Anargya Aset Manajemen^{2}, Viral Blast Global^{2}
Persik	(Chile) Javier Roca	(Indonesia) Andri Ibo	(Indonesia) Noij	Extra Joss^{2}, Harmoni Kediri^{3}
Persikabo 1973	(Indonesia) Liestiadi	(Indonesia) Manahati Lestusen (Note: Manahati Lestusen replaced Ciro Alves as team captain starting from week 14.)	(Indonesia) Adhoc	SBOTOP^{1}^{2}, Extra Joss^{3}
Persipura	(Argentina) Alfredo Vera	(Indonesia) Ian Kabes	(Indonesia) SPECS	Freeport Indonesia^{1}, KukuBima Ener-G!^{1}, Bank Papua^{1}, SIMANJA^{2}, Kartu Debit Persipura^{2}
Persiraja	(Brazil) Sérgio Alexandre	(Indonesia) Mukhlis Nakata	(Indonesia) Adhoc	Extra Joss^{1}, Dek Gam Foundation^{1}, PDAM Tirta Daroy^{1}, Mifa Bersaudara^{1}, JRG Rahayu Shuttle^{2}, Ujong Neubok Dalam^{3}
Persita	(Indonesia) Widodo C. Putro	(Indonesia) Agung Prasetyo	(Indonesia) Made by club	Palang Merah Indonesia^{1}, Matrix Broadband^{1}, Indomilk^{1}, Moya^{1}, Krating Daeng^{2}, Indomie^{2}, SOS Children's Villages Indonesia^{2}, Aetra Tangerang^{3}
PSIS	(Montenegro) Dragan Đukanović	(Brazil) Wallace Costa	(Indonesia) RIORS	Charlie Hospital^{1}, Baja Indoraya^{1}, Indomie^{1}, DBAsia.news^{1}, Extra Joss^{2}, Pelindo III^{2}
PSM	(Netherlands) Joop Gall	(Indonesia) Zulkifli Syukur	(Indonesia) Ewako PSM!	Honda^{1}, Kalla Group^{1}, KukuBima Ener-G!^{3}
PSS	(Indonesia) I Putu Gede	(Indonesia) Bagus Nirwanto	(Indonesia) SMBD	Bank Mandiri^{1}, Ace of News^{1}, Indomie^{1}, SKS Ready Mix^{1}, Haji Tjandra Racing Team^{1}, Viral Blast Global^{2}

Notes:

1. On the front of shirt.
2. On the back of shirt.
3. On the sleeves.
4. On the shorts.

Additionally, SPECS made referee kits and also supplied the match ball, the Illuzion II.

Captaincy changes:

=== Coaching changes ===
Team	Outgoing coach	Manner of departure	Date of vacancy	Week	Table	Incoming coach	Date of appointment
PSM	(Croatia) Bojan Hodak	Signed by Kuala Lumpur City	9 January 2021	Pre-season		(Indonesia) Syamsudin Batola (caretaker)	7 March 2021
Persik	(Indonesia) Budi Sudarsono	Contract expired	10 February 2021	Pre-season		(Indonesia) Joko Susilo	11 March 2021
Arema	(Brazil) Carlos Oliveira	Contract expired	17 February 2021	Pre-season		(Portugal) Eduardo Almeida	3 May 2021
Persela	(Indonesia) Nil Maizar	Contract expired	23 February 2021	Pre-season		(Indonesia) Iwan Setiawan	2 June 2021
Persija	(Indonesia) Sudirman	Demoted to assistant coach	26 April 2021	Pre-season		(Italy) Angelo Alessio	11 June 2021
PSM	(Indonesia) Syamsudin Batola	End of caretaker role	8 July 2021	Pre-season		(Bosnia and Herzegovina) Milomir Šešlija	8 July 2021
PSIS	(Montenegro) Dragan Đukanović	Resigned	10 August 2021	Pre-season		(Indonesia) Imran Nahumarury (caretaker)	10 August 2021
Borneo	(Argentina) Mario Gómez	Resigned	16 September 2021	3	5	(Indonesia) Ahmad Amiruddin (caretaker)	16 September 2021
PSIS	(Indonesia) Imran Nahumarury	End of caretaker role	17 September 2021	3	4	(Australia) Ian Gillan	17 September 2021
Borneo	(Indonesia) Ahmad Amiruddin	End of caretaker role	3 October 2021	6	9	(Bosnia and Herzegovina) Risto Vidaković	3 October 2021
Persik	(Indonesia) Joko Susilo	Sacked	3 October 2021	6	16	(Indonesia) Alfiat (caretaker)	3 October 2021
Persiraja	(Indonesia) Hendri Susilo	Sacked	27 October 2021	9	18	(Indonesia) Akhyar Ilyas (caretaker)	27 October 2021
Madura United	(Indonesia) Rahmad Darmawan	Sacked	9 November 2021	11	14	(Brazil) Fábio Lefundes	15 November 2021
Persik	(Indonesia) Alfiat	End of caretaker role	11 November 2021	11	15	(Chile) Javier Roca	11 November 2021
PSIS	(Australia) Ian Gillan	Became technical director	15 November 2021	11	4	(Indonesia) Imran Nahumarury	15 November 2021
Persipura	(Brazil) Jacksen F. Tiago	Sacked	19 November 2021	12	17	(Argentina) Alfredo Vera	21 November 2021
Persikabo 1973	(Belarus) Igor Kriushenko	Sacked	23 November 2021	13	12	(Indonesia) Liestiadi	25 November 2021
PSM	(Bosnia and Herzegovina) Milomir Šešlija	Sacked	25 November 2021	13	10	(Indonesia) Syamsudin Batola (caretaker)	25 November 2021
Persela	(Indonesia) Iwan Setiawan	Sacked	29 November 2021	14	15	(Indonesia) Ragil Sudirman (caretaker)	29 November 2021
Barito Putera	(Indonesia) Djadjang Nurdjaman	Sacked	14 December 2021	17	15	(Indonesia) Rahmad Darmawan	31 December 2021
PSIS	(Indonesia) Imran Nahumarury	Resigned	18 December 2021	17	6	(Montenegro) Dragan Đukanović	27 December 2021
PSS	(Serbia) Dejan Antonić	Sacked	19 December 2021	17	11	(Indonesia) I Putu Gede	20 December 2021
Persela	(Indonesia) Ragil Sudirman	End of caretaker role	20 December 2021	17	16	(Indonesia) Jafri Sastra	20 December 2021
PSM	(Indonesia) Syamsudin Batola	End of caretaker role	29 December 2021	17	12	(Netherlands) Joop Gall	29 December 2021
Persiraja	(Indonesia) Akhyar Ilyas	End of caretaker role	2 January 2022	17	18	(Brazil) Sérgio Alexandre	2 January 2022
Persija	(Italy) Angelo Alessio	Sacked	19 January 2022	20	8	(Indonesia) Sudirman	20 January 2022
Borneo	(Bosnia and Herzegovina) Risto Vidaković	Resigned	20 January 2022	20	7	(Indonesia) Fakhri Husaini	22 January 2022
Persela	(Indonesia) Jafri Sastra	Resigned	21 February 2022	27	17	(Indonesia) Ragil Sudirman	21 February 2022
Borneo	(Indonesia) Fakhri Husaini	Sacked	26 March 2022	34	6	(Indonesia) Ahmad Amiruddin (caretaker)	26 March 2022

== Foreign players ==
PSSI restricts the number of foreign players to four per team with one of them must come from an association member from the Asian Football Confederation. Teams can use all the foreign players at once.

- Players name in **bold** indicates the player was registered during the mid-season transfer window.
- Former Player(s) were players that out of squad or left club within the season, after pre-season transfer window, or in the mid-season transfer window, and at least had one appearance.

Team	Player 1	Player 2	Player 3	Asian Player	Former Player(s)
Arema	(Brazil) Adilson Maringá	(Cape Verde) Carlos Fortes	(Portugal) Sérgio Silva	(Japan) Renshi Yamaguchi	
Bali United	(Brazil) Éber Bessa	(Brazil) Willian Pacheco	(Cameroon) **Privat Mbarga**	(Iraq) Brwa Nouri	(Netherlands) Melvin Platje
Barito Putera	(Brazil) **Bruno Matos**	(Brazil) **Rafael Silva**	(Brazil) **Renan Alves**	(South Korea) **Kim Jin-sung**	(Brazil) Cássio (Brazil) Rafinha (Kyrgyzstan) Azamat Baymatov (Serbia) Aleksandar Rakić
Bhayangkara	(Brazil) Anderson Salles	(Chad) Ezechiel N'Douassel	(Netherlands) **Melvin Platje**	(South Korea) Lee Yu-jun	(Brazil) Renan Silva
Borneo	(Argentina) Jonathan Bustos	(Brazil) Francisco Torres	(Japan) **Kei Hirose**	(Uzbekistan) Javlon Guseynov	(Tajikistan) Nuriddin Davronov
Madura United	(Brazil) Jaimerson	(Brazil) Jajá	(Brazil) **Renan Silva**	(South Korea) **Hong Jeong-nam**	(Brazil) Rafael Silva (South Korea) Kim Jin-sung
Persebaya	(Brazil) Bruno Moreira	(Netherlands) **Arsenio Valpoort**	(Sierra Leone) Alie Sesay	(Japan) Taisei Marukawa	(Brazil) Jose Wilkson
Persela	(Brazil) Demerson	(Brazil) Guilherme Batata	(Brazil) **Jose Wilkson**	(Iraq) **Selwan Al-Jaberi**	(Afghanistan) Jabar Sharza (Brazil) Ivan Carlos
Persib	(Brazil) **Bruno Cantanhede**	(Brazil) **David da Silva**	(Netherlands) Nick Kuipers	(Palestine) Mohammed Rashid	(Brazil) Wander Luiz (Netherlands) Geoffrey Castillion
Persija	(Croatia) Marko Šimić	(Italy) Marco Motta	(Mali) **Makan Konaté**	(Nepal) Rohit Chand	(Brazil) Yann Motta
Persik	(Brazil) Arthur Silva	(Brazil) Dionatan Machado	(Spain) Youssef Ezzejjari	(Philippines) **Marwin Angeles**	(Lebanon) Ibrahim Bahsoun
Persikabo 1973	(Belarus) Sergey Pushnyakov	(Brazil) Ciro Alves	(Serbia) **Aleksandar Rakić**	(Kyrgyzstan) Veniamin Shumeyko	(Montenegro) Danin Talović
Persipura	(Argentina) **Ramiro Fergonzi**	(Brazil) Hedipo	(Ukraine) Yevhen Bokhashvili	(Japan) Takuya Matsunaga	(Brazil) Henrique Motta
Persiraja	(Brazil) **Bruno Dybal**	(Brazil) Léo Lelis	(Brazil) Paulo Henrique	(Afghanistan) **Jabar Sharza**	(Japan) Shori Murata (Serbia) Vanja Marković
Persita	(Brazil) Harrison Cardoso	(Brazil) **Taylon Correa**		(South Korea) Bae Sin-yeong	(Brazil) Alex (England) Adam Mitter (Tajikistan) Nuriddin Davronov
PSIS	(Brazil) **Flávio Beck Júnior**	(Brazil) Wallace Costa	(Jamaica) **Chevaughn Walsh**	(Palestine) Jonathan Cantillana	(Brazil) Bruno Silva (Iraq) Brian Ferreira
PSM	(England) **Adam Mitter**	(Netherlands) Anco Jansen	(Netherlands) Wiljan Pluim	(Australia) **Golgol Mebrahtu**	(Bosnia and Herzegovina) Šerif Hasić (Kyrgyzstan) Bektur Talgat Uulu
PSS	(Brazil) Juninho	(Brazil) **Wander Luiz**	(Serbia) Mario Maslać	(Australia) Aaron Evans	(Serbia) Nemanja Kojić

== League table ==
Pos	Team	Pld	W	D	L	GF	GA	GD	Pts	Qualification or relegation
1	Bali United (C)	34	23	6	5	57	26	+31	75	Qualification for the 2022 AFC Cup group stage (Note: Bali United qualified for the 2022 AFC Cup group stage as the 2019 Liga 1 champions.) and Qualification for the 2023-24 AFC Champions League Preliminary Round 1
2	Persib	34	20	9	5	48	22	+26	69	
3	Bhayangkara	34	19	9	6	48	27	+21	66	
4	Arema	34	18	11	5	44	25	+19	65	
5	Persebaya	34	18	9	7	56	35	+21	63	
6	Borneo	34	14	10	10	43	35	+8	52	
7	PSIS	34	11	13	10	35	34	+1	46	
8	Persija	34	11	12	11	43	40	+3	45	
9	Madura United	34	10	11	13	45	43	+2	41	
10	Persikabo 1973	34	10	10	14	49	48	+1	40	
11	Persik	34	9	12	13	33	39	−6	39 (Note: Head-to-head points: Persik (+3) 8 pts; Persita (–1) 5 pts; PSS (–2) 2 pts.)	
12	Persita	34	9	12	13	39	49	−10	39	
13	PSS	34	10	9	15	40	48	−8	39	
14	PSM	34	8	14	12	31	41	−10	38	Qualification for the 2022 AFC Cup group stage (Note: PSM qualified for the 2022 AFC Cup group stage as the 2018–19 Piala Indonesia winners.)
15	Barito Putera	34	9	9	16	41	49	−8	36 (Note: Head-to-head results: Persipura 0–1 Barito Putera; Barito Putera 3–0 Persipura.)	
16	Persipura (Note: Persipura were deducted three points by the PSSI Disciplinary Committee as punishment for not attending the match against Madura United on 21 February 2022.) (R)	34	10	9	15	36	47	−11	36	Relegation to Liga 2
17	Persela (R)	34	3	12	19	32	61	−29	21	Relegation to Liga 2
18	Persiraja (R)	34	2	7	25	18	69	−51	13	Relegation to Liga 2

Source: BRI Liga 1 2021–22
Rules for classification: 1) Points; 2) Head-to-head; 3) Goal difference; 4) Goals scored; 5) Drawing.
(C) Champions; (R) Relegated

=== Position by Round ===
Team ╲ Round	1	2	3	4	5	6	7	8	9	10	11	12	13	14	15	16	17	18	19	20	21	22	23	24	25	26	27	28	29	30	31	32	33	34
Arema	7	12	14	13	10	6	4	4	4	3	3	3	3	2	3	2	3	2	1	2	1	1	2	2	1	1	2	3	3	5	5	5	5	4
Bali	3	1	2	1	2	3	6	7	5	7	5	4	4	4	4	5	5	5	5	5	5	4	4	4	2	2	1	1	1	1	1	1	1	1
Barito	16	17	17	18	15	16	16	16	16	16	16	13	14	14	16	16	15	15	15	15	16	16	17	16	15	15	15	15	15	15	15	15	15	15
Bhayangkara	2	3	4	2	1	1	1	1	1	1	1	1	1	1	1	1	1	3	2	1	3	3	1	3	4	4	4	4	4	3	4	3	4	3
Borneo	1	5	7	9	9	10	13	11	13	14	11	10	7	7	6	7	7	8	7	7	8	8	6	6	6	6	6	6	6	6	6	6	6	6
Madura	8	13	15	10	11	11	11	12	11	12	14	15	12	11	12	10	10	12	13	13	10	9	9	9	7	8	8	9	9	8	9	10	9	9
Persebaya	17	6	12	16	12	12	9	10	6	6	6	6	5	5	5	4	4	4	3	4	4	5	5	5	5	5	5	5	5	4	3	4	3	5
Persela	14	8	11	14	13	13	14	14	12	10	12	14	15	15	15	15	16	16	16	16	15	15	16	17	17	16	16	17	17	17	17	17	17	17
Persib	4	2	3	5	4	5	3	3	2	2	2	2	2	3	2	3	2	1	4	3	2	2	3	1	3	3	3	2	2	2	2	2	2	2
Persija	9	11	10	6	6	4	8	5	8	8	9	8	9	10	9	8	8	6	8	8	6	7	8	8	9	7	7	8	8	9	8	7	7	8
Persik	15	9	8	11	14	14	15	13	14	15	15	16	16	16	14	14	14	14	14	14	14	12	13	13	10	12	11	10	10	10	10	11	10	11
Persikabo	10	15	16	8	8	9	7	9	10	11	13	12	13	13	13	13	13	13	12	12	13	14	14	14	14	14	13	13	14	12	13	12	13	10
Persipura	18	18	18	17	18	18	18	18	18	18	18	18	17	17	17	17	17	17	17	17	17	17	15	15	16	17	17	16	16	16	16	16	16	16
Persiraja	13	7	13	15	17	17	17	17	17	17	17	17	18	18	18	18	18	18	18	18	18	18	18	18	18	18	18	18	18	18	18	18	18	18
Persita	6	10	5	7	7	8	10	8	9	9	8	7	8	8	8	9	9	11	9	9	11	11	10	10	11	10	10	11	11	11	11	9	11	12
PSIS	5	4	1	4	3	2	2	2	3	4	4	5	6	6	7	6	6	7	6	6	7	6	7	7	8	9	9	7	7	7	7	8	8	7
PSM	11	14	6	3	5	7	5	6	7	5	7	9	10	9	10	12	12	10	11	11	9	10	11	11	12	13	14	14	12	13	12	13	12	14
PSS	12	16	9	12	16	15	12	15	15	13	10	11	11	12	11	11	11	9	10	10	12	13	12	12	13	11	12	12	13	14	14	14	14	13

Champions of 2021-22 Liga 1
Relegation to Liga 2

First match(es) will be played on 27 August 2021. Source:

== Results ==
Home \ Away	ARE	BLU	BPT	BHA	BOR	MDU	PBY	PSL	PSB	PSJ	KDR	KBO	PPR	RAJ	PTA	SMG	PSM	PSS
Arema	—	0–0	2–1	1–1	2–2	1–0	2–2	3–0	1–2	1–1	0–1	0–0	1–0	1–1	2–2	0–0	1–0	2–0
Bali United	2–1	—	3–0	1–2	2–1	0–1	0–3	2–1	2–2	2–1	1–0	1–1	4–1	5–0	2–0	0–0	2–2	1–0
Barito Putera	1–2	1–2	—	2–3	0–2	0–3	1–1	1–1	1–1	1–1	0–2	0–3	3–0	4–1	2–0	0–1	1–2	0–1
Bhayangkara	0–1	0–3	2–1	—	2–1	1–0	2–1	2–0	0–2	1–1	2–0	4–0	1–2	2–1	2–2	0–0	2–0	2–1
Borneo	1–2	1–1	1–1	1–1	—	0–1	3–1	2–0	0–1	2–1	1–1	2–0	1–0	2–1	2–2	1–1	2–1	1–2
Madura United	1–2	0–2	3–3	2–3	2–2	—	1–2	1–1	0–1	2–3	2–0	1–2	2–2	1–0	1–2	2–1	1–1	1–0
Persebaya	1–0	3–1	2–0	0–1	1–2	1–0	—	1–1	1–1	3–3	1–0	3–1	0–2	2–0	4–0	2–3	2–1	1–0
Persela	0–1	1–2	2–4	0–4	0–2	2–2	2–2	—	1–3	1–1	1–0	2–3	1–0	1–0	0–1	1–2	1–1	1–1
Persib	0–1	0–1	1–0	0–1	0–0	3–2	0–3	1–1	—	0–1	0–0	1–0	3–0	3–1	1–0	0–0	1–1	4–2
Persija	0–1	0–1	1–1	0–0	1–2	1–3	0–1	2–1	0–2	—	2–1	1–0	1–2	0–1	1–1	2–2	3–1	0–2
Persik	2–3	1–3	0–2	1–0	1–0	2–2	0–0	1–0	0–1	2–2	—	1–2	4–2	2–0	2–0	0–0	2–3	0–0
Persikabo 1973	1–3	0–3	1–1	0–1	3–0	1–1	2–3	4–2	0–0	0–4	2–2	—	1–1	5–0	1–1	2–2	3–0	2–0
Persipura	0–1	0–1	0–1	0–2	2–1	0–3 (Note: Madura United were awarded a 3–0 win over Persipura because the latter didn't attend the match.)	1–3	1–1	0–3	0–0	0–0	2–1	—	0–0	1–2	2–1	0–0	4–2
Persiraja	0–2	0–1	1–1	0–2	0–2	1–2	0–1	2–2	0–4	0–1	1–1	0–5	1–2	—	0–3	0–1	0–0	3–2
Persita	0–2	1–2	0–1	2–1	1–1	1–1	1–1	3–0	1–2	1–2	1–1	2–1	0–3	1–1	—	2–3	0–3	1–0
PSIS	0–0	0–1	1–2	1–1	0–1	0–0	0–0	1–0	0–1	1–2	3–0	1–0	0–4	3–1	3–3	—	1–0	1–2
PSM	1–1	2–1	0–2	0–0	0–1	1–0	3–1	2–2	0–2	0–3	0–0	0–0	1–1	1–0	0–2	2–1	—	2–2
PSS	2–1	0–2	3–2	0–0	1–0	1–1	1–3	3–2	1–2	1–1	2–3	3–2	1–1	4–1	0–0	0–1	0–0	—

Source: BRI Liga 1 2021–22
Legend: Blue = home team win; Yellow = draw; Red = away team win.
For upcoming matches, an "a" indicates there is an article about the rivalry between the two participants.

== Season statistics ==
=== Top goalscorers ===
Rank	Player	Team	Goals
1	(Indonesia) Ilija Spasojević	Bali United	23
2	(Portugal) Carlos Fortes	Arema	20
2	(Brazil) Ciro Alves	Persikabo 1973	20
4	(Spain) Youssef Ezzejjari	Persik	18
5	(Japan) Taisei Marukawa	Persebaya	17
6	(Brazil) Francisco Torres	Borneo	15
7	(Croatia) Marko Šimić	Persija	14
8	(Brazil) Rafael Silva	Barito Putera/Madura United	11
8	(Chad) Ezechiel N'Douassel	Bhayangkara	11
8	(Indonesia) Samsul Arif	Persebaya	11
8	(Brazil) Wander Luiz	Persib/PSS	11
8	(Indonesia) Dimas Drajad	Persikabo 1973	11

=== Hat-tricks ===
Player	For	Against	Result	Date
(Brazil) Ciro Alves	Persikabo 1973	Persela	4–2 (H)	27 November 2021
(Brazil) Ciro Alves	Persikabo 1973	Persiraja	5–0 (H)	9 December 2021
(Indonesia) Samsul Arif	Persebaya	Persikabo 1973	3–2 (A)	10 January 2022
(Brazil) Ciro Alves	Persikabo 1973	Persiraja	5–0 (A)	19 March 2022

=== Discipline ===
- Most yellow card(s): 12
  - (Indonesia) Manahati Lestusen (Persikabo 1973)
- Most red card(s): 2
  - (Chad) Ezechiel N'Douassel (Bhayangkara)
  - (Indonesia) Akbar Hermawan (Persela)

== Awards ==
=== Monthly awards ===
Month	Coach of the Month		Player of the Month		Young Player of the Month		Goal of the Month		Ref.
Month	Coach	Club	Player	Club	Player	Club	Player	Club	Ref.
September	(Indonesia) Imran Nahumarury	PSIS	(Indonesia) Ilija Spasojević	Bali United	(Indonesia) Bagas Kaffa	Barito Putera	(Indonesia) Irsyad Maulana	Persita	
October	(Indonesia) Aji Santoso	Persebaya	(Japan) Taisei Marukawa	Persebaya	(Indonesia) Alfriyanto Nico	Persija	(Portugal) Carlos Fortes	Arema	
November	(Portugal) Eduardo Almeida	Arema	(Indonesia) Adam Alis	Bhayangkara	(Indonesia) Bagas Kaffa	Barito Putera	(Indonesia) Marselino Ferdinan	Persebaya	
December	(Indonesia) Aji Santoso	Persebaya	(Japan) Taisei Marukawa	Persebaya	(Indonesia) Marselino Ferdinan	Persebaya	(Croatia) Marko Šimić	Persija	
January	(Portugal) Eduardo Almeida	Arema	(Indonesia) Teja Paku Alam	Persib	(Indonesia) Marselino Ferdinan	Persebaya	(Brazil) Ciro Alves	Persikabo 1973	
February	(Indonesia) Rahmad Darmawan	Barito Putera	(Indonesia) Samsul Arif	Persebaya	(Indonesia) Bagas Kaffa	Barito Putera	(Portugal) Carlos Fortes	Arema	

=== Annual awards ===
Award	Winner	Club
Best Player	(Japan) Taisei Marukawa	Persebaya
Best Coach	(Indonesia) Aji Santoso	Persebaya
Best Young Player	(Indonesia) Marselino Ferdinan	Persebaya
Best Goal	(Portugal) Carlos Fortes	Arema
Fair Play Team	Madura United	
Best Referee	Thoriq Alkatiri	

=== Team of the Season ===
Team of the Season
Goalkeeper	(Indonesia) Teja Paku Alam (Persib)			
Defenders	(Indonesia) Bagas Kaffa (Barito Putera)	(Sierra Leone) Alie Sesay (Persebaya)	(Portugal) Sérgio Silva (Arema)	(Indonesia) Johan Alfarizi (Arema)
Midfielders	(Japan) Taisei Marukawa (Persebaya)		(Iraq) Brwa Nouri (Bali United)	(Brazil) Éber Bessa (Bali United)
Forwards	(Brazil) Ciro Alves (Persikabo 1973)		(Indonesia) Ilija Spasojević (Bali United)	(Indonesia) Samsul Arif (Persebaya)

== See also ==
- 2021–22 Liga 2
- 2021–22 Liga 3
