= 2022–23 Liga 1 (Indonesia) =

Liga 1
- Season: 2022–23
- Dates: 23 July 2022 – 16 April 2023
- Champions: PSM; 1st Liga 1 title 7th Indonesian title
- Champions League: Bali United
- AFC Cup: PSM
- Matches: 306
- Goals: 845 (2.76 per match)
- Top goalscorer: Matheus Pato (25 goals)
- Biggest home win: Madura United 8–0 Barito Putera (23 July 2022)
- Biggest away win: Persita 0–5 Persebaya (18 January 2023)
- Highest scoring: Madura United 8–0 Barito Putera (23 July 2022); Persita 5–3 Persikabo 1973 (19 August 2022); RANS Nusantara 4–4 Bali United (25 January 2023)
- Longest winning run: 9 matches Persik; PSM
- Longest unbeaten run: 15 matches Persib
- Longest winless run: 19 matches RANS Nusantara
- Longest losing run: 7 matches PSS
- Highest attendance: 60,134; Persija 5–0 PSS (15 April 2023)
- Lowest attendance: 142; RANS Nusantara 2–1 Barito Putera (29 August 2022)
- Total attendance: 1,571,761
- Average attendance: 5,137

The 2022–23 Liga 1 (also known as the 2022–23 BRI Liga 1 for sponsorship reasons) was the 6th season of Liga 1 under its current name and the 13th season of the association football, the top Indonesian professional league for association football clubs since its establishment in 2008. It started on 23 July 2022. Bali United were the two-time defending champions.

== Summary ==
Following the Kanjuruhan Stadium disaster, in which at least 135 people were killed in a stampede provoked by police use of tear gas among fans who were still in the stadium, competition in all top three leagues in Indonesia were placed on hold. On 8 October 2022, FIFA recommended that matches be played no later than 17:00 local time and only on weekends to avoid risky situations in some matches.

On 3 December 2022, PSSI announced that the league would resume on 5 December, with all remaining matches being held behind closed doors at least until the first half of the season ended.

== Teams ==
Eighteen teams were competing in the league – the top fifteen teams from the previous season and the three teams promoted from the Liga 2. The promoted teams were Persis (returned to the top flight after fourteen years), RANS Nusantara and Dewa United (both teams will play in the Liga 1 for the first time in their history). They replaced Persipura, Persela (both teams were relegated for the first time since 2008) and Persiraja (relegated after just two seasons back in the top flight).

=== Name changes ===
On 30 May 2022, during the 2022 PSSI Ordinary Congress, four teams had their name change requests accepted by the federation:

- Dewa United removed "Martapura" from its official name, having previously acquired Martapura to play in Liga 2 last season.
- Borneo added their home city of "Samarinda" to their full name, thus becoming Borneo Samarinda.
- TIRA-Persikabo officially changed its name to Persikabo 1973, even though the name was already used for the last season as a commercial arrangement.
- RANS Cilegon changed its name to RANS Nusantara and moved their homebase to Jakarta. Therefore, the club will play their home matches at the Pakansari Stadium, which is also the home of Persikabo.

=== Stadiums and locations ===
Locations of non-Java-based 2022–23 Liga 1 teams
Locations of Java-based 2022–23 Liga 1 teams

Team	Home city	Stadium	Capacity
Arema	Malang	Kanjuruhan Stadium	42,449
Bali United	Gianyar	Kapten I Wayan Dipta Stadium	18,000
Barito Putera	Banjarmasin	Demang Lehman Stadium, at Banjarbaru	15,000
Bhayangkara	Bekasi	Wibawa Mukti Stadium	30,000
Borneo Samarinda	Samarinda	Segiri Stadium	16,000
Dewa United	South Tangerang	Indomilk Arena, at Tangerang	30,000
Madura United	Pamekasan	Gelora Ratu Pamelingan Stadium	13,500
Persebaya	Surabaya	Gelora Bung Tomo Stadium	45,000
Persib	Bandung	Gelora Bandung Lautan Api Stadium	38,000
Persija	Jakarta	Patriot Candrabhaga Stadium, at Bekasi	30,000
Persik	Kediri	Brawijaya Stadium	20,000
Persikabo 1973	Bogor	Pakansari Stadium	30,000
Persis	Surakarta	Manahan Stadium	20,000
Persita	Tangerang	Indomilk Arena	30,000
PSIS	Semarang	Jatidiri Stadium	25,000
PSM	Makassar	Gelora B.J. Habibie Stadium, at Parepare	20,000
PSS	Sleman	Maguwoharjo Stadium	31,700
RANS Nusantara	Jakarta	Pakansari Stadium, at Bogor	30,000

=== Personnel and kits ===
Team	Head coach	Captain	Kit manufacturer	Shirt sponsor(s)
Arema	(Indonesia) Joko Susilo	(Indonesia) Johan Alfarizi	(Indonesia) SEA^{5}	The Legion Nutrition^{1}, MS Glow for Men^{1}, Indomie^{1}, Vidio^{1}, Mitra Bukalapak^{1}, Extra Joss^{2}
Bali United	(Brazil) Stefano Cugurra	(Indonesia) Fadil Sausu	(Indonesia) SPECS	Indofood^{1}, Smartfren^{1}, Bank Ina^{1}, Pintu^{1}, Eneos^{1}, AdaKami^{1}, Alderon^{1}, KukuBima^{1}, Gojek^{1}, Tokopedia^{1}, KVibes.id^{1}, CBN Fiber^{2}, Indomie^{2}, Intersoccer^{2}, dramaojol.id^{3}, Vidio^{3}
Barito Putera	(Indonesia) Rahmad Darmawan	(Indonesia) Rizky Pora	(Indonesia) H^{5}	Hasnur Group^{1}
Bhayangkara	(Indonesia) Agus Sugeng (caretaker)	(Indonesia) Awan Setho	(Indonesia) Mills	BNI^{1}, Gojek^{1}, Gopay^{1}, Envi^{1}, Extra Joss^{2}, Jasa Raharja^{3}
Borneo Samarinda	(Netherlands) Pieter Huistra	(Indonesia) Diego Michiels	(Indonesia) Etams	Ansaf^{1}, Pupuk Kaltim^{1}, KukuBima^{1}, Ghani Raya Mandiri^{2}
Dewa United	(Netherlands) Jan Olde Riekerink	(Indonesia) Rangga Muslim	(Indonesia) Mills	Gudang Kripto^{1}, Nusapay^{1}, JHL Solitaire^{3}
Madura United	(Brazil) Osvaldo Lessa (caretaker)	(Indonesia) Fachruddin Aryanto	(Indonesia) XTen	KANA^{1}, POJUR^{1}, Oxygen.id^{2}
Persebaya	(Indonesia) Aji Santoso	(Indonesia) Alwi Slamat	(Indonesia) AZA	Kapal Api^{1}, Extra Joss^{1}, KingsWallet^{1}, MPM Honda Distributor^{2}, Universitas Muhammadiyah Surabaya^{3}
Persib	(Spain) Luis Milla	(Indonesia) Victor Igbonefo	(Indonesia) Sportama	Mobil^{1}, Indofood^{1}, Tokopedia^{1}, Pria Punya Selera^{1}, Intersoccer^{1}, Kopi ABC^{2}, Envi^{3}, Indomie^{3}
Persija	(Germany) Thomas Doll	(Indonesia) Andritany Ardhiyasa	(Indonesia) Juara	KukuBima^{1}, Amman Mineral^{1}, Indomie^{1}, Octa Investama Berjangka^{1}, PStore^{1}, Anargya Aset Manajemen^{2}, Bluebird^{2}, Ithaca Resources^{3}
Persik	(Portugal) Divaldo Alves	(Indonesia) Arthur Irawan	(Indonesia) DJ Sport	Athletes For Good^{1}
Persikabo 1973	(Singapore) Aidil Sharin Sahak	(Indonesia) Manahati Lestusen	(Indonesia) Adhoc	SBOTOP^{1}
Persis	(Mexico) Leonardo Medina	(Indonesia) Eky Taufik	(Indonesia) Made by club	Free Fire^{1}, Aladin Bank^{1}, Gurih^{1}, Vidio^{2}, ID Express^{2}
Persita	(Chile) Luis Durán	(Indonesia) Muhammad Toha	(Indonesia) Mills	Indomilk^{1}, Moya^{1}, Matrix Broadband^{1}, Extra Joss^{2}, Indomie^{2}, Palang Merah Indonesia^{2}, SOS Children's Villages Indonesia^{2}, Aetra Tangerang^{3}
PSIS	(Malta) Gilbert Agius	(Indonesia) Hari Nur Yulianto	(Indonesia) RIORS	Indomie^{1}, KukuBima^{1}, nexa^{1}, Yamaha Mataram Sakti^{2}, IBGADGET^{3}
PSM	(Portugal) Bernardo Tavares	(Netherlands) Wiljan Pluim	(Indonesia) Rewako^{5}	Honda^{1}, Kalla Group^{1}, KukuBima^{3}
PSS	(Indonesia) Seto Nurdiantoro	(Indonesia) Kim Kurniawan	(Indonesia) SMBD	MedcoEnergi^{1}, Indomie^{1}, Amman Mineral^{1}, Extra Joss^{2}
RANS Nusantara	(Brazil) Rodrigo Santana	(Indonesia) Arif Satria	(Singapore) HUNDRED	Kopiko Lucky Day^{1}, Tokopedia^{1}, SiCepat Ekspres^{1}, Lemonilo^{2}

Notes:

1. On the front of shirt.
2. On the back of shirt.
3. On the sleeves.
4. On the shorts.
5. Apparel made by club.

=== Coaching changes ===
Team	Outgoing head coach	Manner of departure	Date of vacancy	Week	Table	Replaced by	Date of appointment
RANS Nusantara	Vacant	New head coach appointed	31 December 2021	Pre-season		(Indonesia) Rahmad Darmawan	11 April 2022
PSIS	(Montenegro) Dragan Đukanović	End of contract	1 April 2022	Pre-season		(Brazil) Sérgio Alexandre	10 June 2022
Dewa United	(Indonesia) Kas Hartadi	Did not meet license requirement	4 April 2022	Pre-season		(Indonesia) Nil Maizar	4 April 2022
Bhayangkara	(Northern Ireland) Paul Munster	End of contract	4 April 2022	Pre-season		(Indonesia) Widodo C. Putro	10 May 2022
Persija	(Indonesia) Sudirman	End of contract	4 April 2022	Pre-season		(Germany) Thomas Doll	23 April 2022
Persita	(Indonesia) Widodo C. Putro	Resigned	6 April 2022	Pre-season		(Argentina) Alfredo Vera	18 April 2022
Borneo Samarinda	(Indonesia) Ahmad Amiruddin (caretaker)	End of caretaker spell	7 April 2022	Pre-season		(Bosnia and Herzegovina) Milomir Šešlija	7 April 2022
Persis	(Indonesia) Eko Purjianto	Demoted to assistant coach	7 April 2022	Pre-season		(Brazil) Jacksen F. Tiago	7 April 2022
PSS	(Indonesia) I Putu Gede	End of contract	9 April 2022	Pre-season		(Indonesia) Seto Nurdiantoro	9 April 2022
PSM	(Netherlands) Joop Gall	End of contract	11 April 2022	Pre-season		(Portugal) Bernardo Tavares	11 April 2022
Barito Putera	(Indonesia) Rahmad Darmawan	Signed by RANS Nusantara	11 April 2022	Pre-season		(Serbia) Dejan Antonić	21 April 2022
Persikabo 1973	(Indonesia) Liestiadi	Mutual consent	11 April 2022	Pre-season		(Indonesia) Djadjang Nurdjaman	30 April 2022
Persib	(Netherlands) Robert Alberts	Resigned	10 August 2022	3	17	(Indonesia) Budiman Yunus (caretaker)	10 August 2022
Persik	(Chile) Javier Roca	Sacked	13 August 2022	4	17	(Indonesia) Jan Saragih (caretaker)	13 August 2022
Persib	(Indonesia) Budiman Yunus	End of caretaker spell	19 August 2022	5	9	(Spain) Luis Milla	19 August 2022
Persis	(Brazil) Jacksen F. Tiago	Resigned	19 August 2022	5	15	(Indonesia) Rasiman (caretaker)	21 August 2022
PSIS	(Brazil) Sérgio Alexandre	Sacked	24 August 2022	6	12	(Indonesia) Achmad Resal (caretaker)	24 August 2022
Barito Putera	(Serbia) Dejan Antonić	Sacked	25 August 2022	6	16	(Brazil) Vitor Tinico (caretaker)	28 August 2022
Persik	(Indonesia) Jan Saragih	End of caretaker spell	27 August 2022	7	18	(Portugal) Divaldo Alves	27 August 2022
Arema	(Portugal) Eduardo Almeida	Sacked	5 September 2022	8	9	(Chile) Javier Roca	6 September 2022
Barito Putera	(Brazil) Vitor Tinico	End of caretaker spell	22 September 2022	10	17	(Brazil) Rodney Goncalves	22 September 2022
Borneo Samarinda	(Bosnia and Herzegovina) Milomir Šešlija	Sacked	25 September 2022	10	5	(Indonesia) Miftahudin Mukson (caretaker)	25 September 2022
PSIS	(Indonesia) Achmad Resal (caretaker)	End of caretaker spell	26 September 2022	10	12	(Australia) Ian Gillan	26 September 2022
Borneo Samarinda	(Indonesia) Miftahudin Mukson (caretaker)	End of caretaker Spell	27 September 2022	10	5	(Brazil) André Gaspar	27 September 2022
Persis	(Indonesia) Rasiman (caretaker)	End of caretaker Spell	6 November 2022	11	14	(Mexico) Leonardo Medina	6 November 2022
Dewa United	(Indonesia) Nil Maizar	Sacked	28 December 2022	17	17	(Netherlands) Jan Olde Riekerink	1 January 2023
Persikabo 1973	(Indonesia) Djadjang Nurdjaman	Mutual consent	3 January 2023	17	9	(Singapore) Aidil Sharin Sahak	7 January 2023
PSIS	(Australia) Ian Gillan	Mutual consent	16 January 2023	18	12	(Indonesia) Muhammad Ridwan (caretaker)	16 January 2023
RANS Nusantara	(Indonesia) Rahmad Darmawan	End of contract	1 February 2023	21	16	(Brazil) Rodrigo Santana	1 February 2023
Barito Putera	(Brazil) Rodney Goncalves	Sacked	4 February 2023	21	16	(Indonesia) Isnan Ali (caretaker)	4 February 2023
Bhayangkara	(Indonesia) Widodo C. Putro	Sacked	4 February 2023	22	15	(Indonesia) Agus Sugeng (caretaker)	4 February 2023
Arema	(Chile) Javier Roca	Resigned	6 February 2023	22	10	(Indonesia) I Putu Gede (caretaker)	6 February 2023
Barito Putera	(Indonesia) Isnan Ali (caretaker)	End of caretaker spell	11 February 2023	22	16	(Indonesia) Rahmad Darmawan	11 February 2023
PSIS	(Indonesia) Muhammad Ridwan (caretaker)	End of caretaker spell	15 February 2023	24	8	(Malta) Gilbert Agius	15 February 2023
Borneo Samarinda	(Brazil) André Gaspar	Mutual consent	19 February 2023	24	5	(Indonesia) Miftahudin Mukson (caretaker)	19 February 2023
Borneo Samarinda	(Indonesia) Miftahudin Mukson (caretaker)	End of caretaker Spell	21 February 2023	25	4	(Netherlands) Pieter Huistra	21 February 2023
Persita	(Argentina) Alfredo Vera	Mutual consent	22 February 2023	25	12	(Indonesia) Ilham Jaya Kesuma (caretaker)	22 February 2023
Persita	(Indonesia) Ilham Jaya Kesuma (caretaker)	End of caretaker role	27 February 2023	26	10	(Chile) Luis Durán	27 February 2023
Madura United	(Brazil) Fábio Lefundes	Resigned	4 March 2023	28	6	(Brazil) Osvaldo Lessa (caretaker)	6 March 2023
Arema	(Indonesia) I Putu Gede (caretaker)	End of caretaker role	9 March 2023	28	13	(Indonesia) Joko Susilo	9 March 2023

== Foreign players ==
PSSI restricts the number of foreign players to four per team with one of them must come from an association member from the Asian Football Confederation. Teams can use all the foreign players at once.

- Players named in **bold** indicates the player was registered during the mid-season transfer window.
- Former players named in italics are players that were out of squad or left the club within the season, after the pre-season transfer window, or in the mid-season transfer window, and at least had one appearance.

Team	Player 1	Player 2	Player 3	AFC player	Former players
Arema	(Brazil) Adilson Maringá	(Guinea-Bissau) Abel Camará	(Portugal) Sérgio Silva	(Japan) Renshi Yamaguchi	
Bali United	(Brazil) Éber Bessa	(Brazil) **Wellington Carvalho**	(Cameroon) Privat Mbarga	(Iraq) Brwa Nouri	(Brazil) Willian Pacheco
Barito Putera	(Brazil) **Gustavo Tocantins**	(Brazil) Renan Alves	(Japan) **Ryota Noma**	(Philippines) Mike Ott	(Brazil) Rafael Silva (Brazil) Rafinha
Bhayangkara	(Brazil) **Alex Martins**	(Brazil) Anderson Salles	(Uruguay) **Matías Mier**	(Afghanistan) Adam Najem	(Morocco) Youness Mokhtar (Spain) Youssef Ezzejjari
Borneo Samarinda	(Argentina) Jonathan Bustos	(Brazil) **Júlio César**	(Brazil) Matheus Pato	(Japan) Kei Hirose	(Uzbekistan) Javlon Guseynov
Dewa United	(Brazil) Lucas Ramos	(North Macedonia) Risto Mitrevski	(Switzerland) Karim Rossi	(Lebanon) Majed Osman	
Madura United	(Brazil) Cleberson	(Brazil) Jajá	(Brazil) Lulinha	(Australia) **Kwabena Appiah**	(Timor-Leste) Pedro Henrique
Persebaya	(Brazil) Léo Lelis	(Brazil) **Paulo Victor**	(Portugal) **Zé Valente**	(Japan) Sho Yamamoto	(Brazil) Higor Vidal (Brazil) Sílvio
Persib	(Brazil) Ciro Alves	(Brazil) David da Silva	(Netherlands) Nick Kuipers	(Philippines) Daisuke Sato	
Persija	(Czech Republic) Michael Krmenčík	(Czech Republic) Ondřej Kúdela	(Germany) Hanno Behrens	(Bahrain) Abdulla Yusuf Helal	
Persik	(Brazil) **Anderson Nascimento**	(Brazil) Renan Silva	(Portugal) **Flávio Silva**	(Nepal) Rohit Chand	(Brazil) Arthur Silva (Brazil) Joanderson
Persikabo 1973	(Brazil) Bruno Dybal	(Brazil) Lucão	(Brazil) **Sílvio**	(Timor-Leste) **Pedro Henrique**	(Brazil) Gustavo Tocantins (Japan) Tomoki Wada
Persis	(Argentina) Alexis Messidoro	(Brazil) Jaimerson	(Spain) Fernando Rodríguez	(Japan) Ryo Matsumura	(Australia) Aaron Evans (Spain) Gerard Artigas
Persita	(Argentina) Ezequiel Vidal	(Argentina) Ramiro Fergonzi	(South Korea) Bae Sin-yeong	(Uzbekistan) **Javlon Guseynov**	(Argentina) Agustín Cattaneo
PSIS	(Brazil) **Vitinho**	(Cape Verde) Carlos Fortes	(Japan) **Ryo Fujii**	(Japan) Taisei Marukawa	(Palestine) Jonathan Cantillana (Sierra Leone) Alie Sesay
PSM	(Brazil) Everton	(Cape Verde) Yuran Fernandes	(Netherlands) Wiljan Pluim	(Japan) Kenzo Nambu	
PSS	(Lebanon) Jihad Ayoub	(Ukraine) **Yevhen Bokhashvili**		(Palestine) **Jonathan Cantillana**	(Brazil) Mychell Chagas (Brazil) Tallysson Duarte (Portugal) Zé Valente
RANS Nusantara	(Belgium) **Yanis Mbombo**	(Brazil) **Willian Correia**	(Mali) Makan Konaté	(Japan) Mitsuru Maruoka	(Brazil) Victor Sallinas (Brazil) Wander Luiz

== League table ==
Pos	Team	Pld	W	D	L	GF	GA	GD	Pts	Qualification or relegation
1	PSM (C)	34	22	9	3	63	28	+35	75	Qualification for the additional play-offs for AFC Club Competition and Qualification for the 2023–24 AFC Cup Play-Offs
2	Persija	34	20	6	8	47	27	+20	66	
3	Persib	34	19	5	10	54	50	+4	62	
4	Borneo Samarinda	34	16	9	9	64	40	+24	57	
5	Bali United	34	16	6	12	67	53	+14	54	Qualification for the additional play-offs for AFC Club Competition and Qualification for the 2023–24 AFC Champions League Preliminary Round 1
6	Persebaya	34	15	7	12	52	45	+7	52	
7	Bhayangkara	34	15	6	13	53	44	+9	51 (Note: Head-to-head results: Madura United 1–0 Bhayangkara; Bhayangkara 4–0 Madura United.)	
8	Madura United	34	14	9	11	39	36	+3	51	
9	Persita Tangerang	34	13	8	13	43	46	−3	47	
10	Persis	34	11	11	12	50	47	+3	44 (Note: Head-to-head results: Persik 1–3 Persis; Persis 1–0 Persik.)	
11	Persik	34	12	8	14	42	43	−1	44	
12	Arema	34	12	6	16	32	40	−8	42	
13	PSIS	34	12	5	17	44	53	−9	41 (Note: Head-to-head results: PSIS 3–2 Persikabo 1973; Persikabo 1973 0–0 PSIS.)	
14	Persikabo 1973	34	11	8	15	43	48	−5	41	
15	Barito Putera	34	10	8	16	44	55	−11	38	
16	PSS	34	10	4	20	34	57	−23	34	
17	Dewa United	34	8	9	17	34	53	−19	33	
18	RANS Nusantara	34	3	10	21	40	80	−40	19	

Source: BRI Liga 1 2022–23
Rules for classification: 1) Points; 2) Head-to-head points; 3) Head-to-head goal difference; 4) Head-to-head goals scored; 5) Head-to-head away goals scored; 6) Goal difference; 7) Goals scored; 8) Fair-play points; 9) Draw.
(C) Champions

== Results ==
Home \ Away	ARE	BAL	BRT	BHA	BOR	DEW	MDR	PBY	PSB	PSJ	KDR	KBO	SOL	PTA	SMG	PSM	PSS	RNS
Arema	—	1–3	1–0	0–3	0–0	0–0	0–2	2–3	1–2	0–1	2–3	3–1	2–1	2–0	2–1	0–1	0–0	4–2
Bali United	1–2	—	1–2	3–0	1–3	6–0	1–1	4–0	1–1	1–0	4–0	1–2	3–1	1–1	3–2	2–2	1–2	3–2
Barito Putera	1–1	1–2	—	2–0	3–1	0–0	1–2	2–1	2–1	0–1	2–2	1–1	2–3	1–0	3–0	1–1	1–2	4–1
Bhayangkara	1–0	3–1	1–1	—	2–2	1–1	4–0	1–0	2–2	2–1	2–3	3–2	0–1	2–3	3–2	0–0	3–1	5–1
Borneo Samarinda	3–0	5–1	0–0	1–3	—	3–0	3–0	2–1	4–1	3–1	2–0	3–1	2–1	2–2	6–1	1–1	0–0	4–2
Dewa United	0–2	1–2	1–2	2–0	1–0	—	1–1	1–2	1–1	0–1	1–3	1–3	1–1	3–2	2–1	1–1	0–0	2–2
Madura United	1–1	1–3	8–0	1–0	0–1	1–0	—	0–2	0–1	0–0	1–0	2–1	2–3	1–1	0–3	1–3	2–1	0–0
Persebaya	1–0	0–1	3–2	2–1	3–2	3–0	2–2	—	2–2	0–1	1–1	3–2	0–0	2–0	1–0	0–1	4–2	1–2
Persib	1–0	2–3	5–2	2–1	1–0	2–1	1–3	2–1	—	1–0	0–2	1–4	3–1	1–0	2–1	1–2	2–0	2–1
Persija	2–0	3–2	2–1	2–1	1–0	3–2	0–0	1–1	2–0	—	1–1	1–0	2–1	1–0	1–0	4–2	5–0	3–1
Persik	0–1	1–1	2–0	1–1	1–2	1–0	2–0	1–0	0–3	2–0	—	2–0	1–3	3–1	1–2	0–0	0–2	5–1
Persikabo 1973	0–1	2–1	3–1	0–1	3–2	0–2	0–2	1–0	1–1	1–1	0–0	—	2–0	1–1	0–0	0–1	2–0	1–0
Persis	1–1	2–0	0–0	1–3	1–1	2–3	1–0	3–3	1–2	1–0	1–0	1–1	—	1–2	0–0	1–1	4–1	6–1
Persita	0–1	2–3	0–3	1–0	1–1	1–0	0–1	0–5	4–0	1–0	2–0	5–3	0–0	—	1–0	0–0	2–1	4–1
PSIS	1–0	0–3	2–1	0–1	2–4	3–2	0–2	1–2	1–3	2–0	2–1	3–2	1–1	1–1	—	4–0	5–2	1–1
PSM	1–0	2–0	4–1	3–1	3–0	2–0	0–1	3–0	5–1	1–1	2–1	2–0	3–2	3–1	2–0	—	4–0	3–1
PSS	2–0	2–0	1–0	0–1	2–1	1–3	0–1	0–1	0–1	0–2	2–1	1–2	2–1	1–2	0–1	1–2	—	2–0
RANS Nusantara	1–2	4–4	2–1	2–1	0–0	0–1	0–0	2–2	1–3	0–3	1–1	1–1	2–3	1–2	0–1	1–2	3–3	—

Source: BRI Liga 1 2022–23
Legend: Blue = home team win; Yellow = draw; Red = away team win.
For upcoming matches, an "a" indicates there is an article about the rivalry between the two participants.

== Additional play-offs for qualification to the AFC Club Competition ==
Due to the change of AFC competition dates to an autumn–spring format, two seasons of Indonesian domestic football had been completed prior to the beginning of the next AFC competitions. The qualification method required an additional two-leg play-off to be held between the premiers from the past two seasons. The winner qualified for the play-off stage of the 2023–24 AFC Champions League, and the loser qualified to the playoff rounds of the 2023–24 AFC Cup.

Team 1	Agg.	Team 2	1st leg	2nd leg
PSM Makassar	2–2 (4–5 p)	Bali United	1–1	1–1 (a.e.t.)

6 June 2023
19:30 WITA (UTC+8)

Bali United	1–1	PSM Makassar
Irfan 15'	Report	Spasojević 70' (o.g.)

Kapten I Wayan Dipta Stadium, Gianyar
Attendance: 14,087
Referee: Thoriq Alkatiri

10 June 2023
19:30 WITA (UTC+8)

PSM Makassar	1–1 (a.e.t.)	Bali United
Rizky 83'	Report	Erwin 52' (o.g.)
Penalties
Yuran (penalty scored); Adilson (penalty scored); Rasyid (penalty scored); Raehan (penalty scored); Pluim (penalty missed)	4–5	(penalty scored) Spasojević; (penalty scored) Nouri; (penalty scored) R. Fajrin; (penalty scored) Haudi; (penalty scored) Rahmat

Gelora B.J. Habibie Stadium, Parepare
Attendance: 8,317
Referee: Yudi Nurcahya

2–2 on aggregate. Bali United won 5–4 on penalties.

== Season statistics ==
=== Top goalscorers ===
Rank	Player	Team	Goals
1	(Brazil) Matheus Pato	Borneo Samarinda	25
2	(Brazil) David da Silva	Persib	24
3	(Indonesia) Ilija Spasojević	Bali United	17
4	(Cameroon) Privat Mbarga	Bali United	16
5	(Brazil) Gustavo Tocantins	Barito Putera/Persikabo 1973	14
6	(Brazil) Lulinha	Madura United	12
7	(Brazil) Alex Martins	Bhayangkara	11
7	(Japan) Ryo Matsumura	Persis	11
7	(Indonesia) Ramadhan Sananta	PSM	11
7	(Netherlands) Wiljan Pluim	PSM	11

=== Hat-tricks ===
Player	For	Against	Result	Date
(Brazil) Lulinha	Madura United	Barito Putera	8–0 (H)	23 July 2022
(Indonesia) Riyan Ardiansyah	PSIS	Persikabo 1973	3–2 (H)	9 September 2022
(Indonesia) Ilija Spasojević	Bali United	Dewa United	6–0 (H)	10 September 2022
(Brazil) Matheus Pato	Borneo Samarinda	Madura United	3–0 (H)	1 October 2022
(Brazil) Matheus Pato	Borneo Samarinda	PSIS	6–1 (H)	12 March 2023
(Brazil) Alex	Bhayangkara	RANS Nusantara	5–1 (H)	30 March 2023
(Brazil) Matheus Pato	Borneo Samarinda	Bali United	5–1 (H)	3 April 2023
(Czech Republic) Michael Krmenčík	Persija	PSS	5–0 (H)	15 April 2023

=== Discipline ===
- Most yellow card(s): 12
  - (Brazil) Éber Bessa (Bali United)
  - (Lebanon) Jihad Ayoub (PSS)
- Most red card(s): 2
  - (Brazil) Jaimerson (Persis)

== Attendances ==
Pos	Team	Total	High	Low	Average	Change
1	Persija	303,015	60,134	8,154	17,824	−26.7%
2	PSS	137,336	27,683	1,221	8,079	−57.3%
3	Arema	131,973	42,588	3,077	7,763	−45.3%
4	PSM	127,989	18,436	2,427	7,529	−1.8%
5	Persib	127,469	23,579	988	7,498	−50.2%
6	Persebaya	106,689	29,000	2,400	6,276	−61.9%
7	Borneo Samarinda	87,093	9,620	2,166	5,123	+61.6%
8	Persis	82,227	18,919	1,712	4,837	n/a^{†}
9	PSIS	74,005	11,928	1,742	4,353	−51.7%
10	Persik	59,328	12,125	918	3,490	−55.6%
11	Barito Putera	59,077	8,199	1,568	3,475	−27.4%
12	Bali United	49,848	13,754	5,161	2,932	−82.7%
13	Persita	49,819	8,237	726	2,931	−47.2%
14	Persikabo 1973	40,314	13,704	723	2,371	−58.7%
15	Madura United	40,286	8,147	286	2,370	−29.4%
16	Bhayangkara	39,165	21,400	169	2,304	+119.2%
17	RANS Nusantara	29,849	9,857	142	1,756	n/a^{†}
18	Dewa United	26,279	3,171	1,039	1,546	n/a^{†}
	League total	1,571,761	60,134	142	5,137	−45.1%

Source: BRI Liga 1 2022–23
Notes:
^{†} Teams played previous season in Liga 2
* Comparison for previous season average attendance was based on 2019 Liga 1, because 2020 Liga 1 was cancelled.

== Awards ==
=== Monthly awards ===
Month	Coach of the Month		Player of the Month		Young Player of the Month		Goal of the Month		Ref.
Month	Coach	Club	Player	Club	Player	Club	Player	Club	Ref.
August	(Portugal) Bernardo Tavares	PSM	(Indonesia) Stefano Lilipaly	Borneo Samarinda	(Indonesia) Muhammad Ferarri	Persija	(Indonesia) Marselino Ferdinan	Persebaya	
September	(Portugal) Bernardo Tavares	PSM	(Indonesia) Ilija Spasojević	Bali United	(Indonesia) Beckham Putra	Persib	(Indonesia) Dimas Drajad	Persikabo 1973	
December	(Spain) Luis Milla	Persib	(Brazil) David da Silva	Persib	(Indonesia) Dzaky Asraf	PSM	(Indonesia) Yance Sayuri	PSM	
January	(Spain) Luis Milla	Persib	(Brazil) David da Silva	Persib	(Indonesia) Marselino Ferdinan	Persebaya	(Indonesia) Marselino Ferdinan	Persebaya	
February	(Portugal) Bernardo Tavares	PSM	(Netherlands) Wiljan Pluim	PSM	(Indonesia) Ananda Raehan	PSM	(Indonesia) Marc Klok	Persib	
March	(Portugal) Divaldo Alves	Persik	(Brazil) Renan Silva	Persik	(Indonesia) Fajar Fathur Rahman	Borneo Samarinda	(Portugal) Zé Valente	Persebaya	

=== Annual awards ===
Award	Winner	Club	Ref.
Best Player	(Netherlands) Wiljan Pluim	PSM	
Best Coach	(Portugal) Bernardo Tavares	PSM	
Best Young Player	(Indonesia) Rio Fahmi	Persija	
Best Goal	(Brazil) Matheus Pato	Borneo Samarinda	
Fair Play Team	Bhayangkara		
Best Referee	Bangbang Syamsudar		

=== Team of the season ===
Pos.	Player	Team	Ref.
GK	(Indonesia) Andritany Ardhiyasa	Persija	
DF	(Indonesia) Rio Fahmi	Persija	
DF	(Czech Republic) Ondřej Kúdela	Persija	
DF	(Cape Verde) Yuran Fernandes	PSM	
DF	(Indonesia) Yance Sayuri	PSM	
MF	(Indonesia) Yakob Sayuri	PSM	
MF	(Netherlands) Wiljan Pluim	PSM	
MF	(Japan) Sho Yamamoto	Persebaya	
MF	(Indonesia) Stefano Lilipaly	Borneo Samarinda	
FW	(Brazil) David Da Silva	Persib	
FW	(Brazil) Matheus Pato	Borneo Samarinda	

== See also ==
- 2022–23 Liga 2
- 2022–23 Liga 3
- 2022–23 Piala Indonesia
