= 2012–13 Eerste Divisie =

57th season of the second-tier football league in Netherlands

Eerste Divisie
- Season: 2012–13
- Champions: SC Cambuur
- Promoted: SC Cambuur, Go Ahead Eagles

The 2012–13 Eerste Divisie, known as Jupiler League for sponsorship reasons, was the fifty-seventh season of Eerste Divisie since its establishment in 1955. It began on 10 August 2012 with the first matches of the season and ended on 26 May 2013 with the returns of the finals of the promotion/relegation play-offs, also involving the 16th- and 17th-placed teams from the 2012–13 Eredivisie. On 3 May 2013, during the last round of the regular season, SC Cambuur secured the championship and the only direct promotion berth. Go Ahead Eagles won promotion to the Eredivisie in the play-offs.

== Teams ==
A total of 18 teams took part in the league. PEC Zwolle were promoted from the Eerste Divisie as 2011–12 champions and replaced by bottom-placed Eredivisie SBV Excelsior, whereas Willem II won a top flight place in the nacompetitie, replacing De Graafschap, who were eliminated from the post-season playoff and therefore relegated to Eerste Divisie for this season. No team was promoted from the Topklasse, thus allowing last-placed FC Emmen to keep their place in the second tier.

Location of teams in the Eerste Divisie 2011-2012

Club	Location	Venue	Capacity
AGOVV Apeldoorn	Apeldoorn	Stadion Berg & Bos	3,250
Almere City FC	Almere	Mitsubishi Forklift Stadion	3,000
Cambuur	Leeuwarden	Cambuur Stadion	10,250
FC Den Bosch	's-Hertogenbosch	De Vliert	9,000
FC Dordrecht	Dordrecht	GN Bouw Stadion	4,100
FC Eindhoven	Eindhoven	Jan Louwers Stadion	4,600
FC Emmen	Emmen	Univé Stadion	8,600
SBV Excelsior	Rotterdam	Stadion Woudestein	3,531
Fortuna Sittard	Sittard	Trendwork Arena	12,500
Go Ahead Eagles	Deventer	Adelaarshorst	6,700
De Graafschap	Doetinchem	De Vijverberg	12,600
Helmond Sport	Helmond	Stadion De Braak	4,100
MVV	Maastricht	De Geusselt	10,000
FC Oss	Oss	Heesen Yachts Stadion	4,700
Sparta Rotterdam	Rotterdam	Het Kasteel	11,026
Telstar	Velsen	TATA Steel Stadion	3,625
SC Veendam	Veendam	De Langeleegte	5,290
FC Volendam	Volendam	Kras Stadion	6,260

=== Managerial changes ===
Team	Outgoing manager	Manner of departure	Date of vacancy	Position in table	Replaced by	Date of appointment
AGOVV Apeldoorn	(Netherlands) Marco Heering	End of interim spell	1 July 2012	Pre-season	(Netherlands) Andries Ulderink	1 July 2012
FC Den Bosch	(Netherlands) Alfons Groenendijk	End of contract	1 July 2012	Pre-season	(Netherlands) Jan Poortvliet	1 July 2012
FC Eindhoven	(Netherlands) Erwin Koeman	End of contract	1 July 2012	Pre-season	(Netherlands) John Lammers	1 July 2012
FC Emmen	(Netherlands) René Hake	Mutual consent	1 July 2012	Pre-season	(Netherlands) Joop Gall	1 July 2012
SBV Excelsior	(Netherlands) John Lammers	End of contract	1 July 2012	Pre-season	(Netherlands) Leon Vlemmings	1 July 2012
Fortuna Sittard	(Netherlands) Tini Ruijs	Resigned	1 July 2012	Pre-season	(Netherlands) Wil Boessen	1 July 2012
Go Ahead Eagles	(Scotland) Jimmy Calderwood	End of interim spell	1 July 2012	Pre-season	(Netherlands) Erik ten Hag	1 July 2012
De Graafschap	(Netherlands) Richard Roelofsen	End of interim spell	1 July 2012	Pre-season	(Netherlands) Pieter Huistra	1 July 2012
Helmond Sport	(Netherlands) Hans de Koning	Signed by FC Volendam	1 July 2012	Pre-season	(Netherlands) Eric Meijers	1 July 2012
FC Oss	(Netherlands) Dirk Heesen	End of contract	1 July 2012	Pre-season	(Netherlands) Anton Janssen	1 July 2012
Telstar	(Netherlands) Jan Poortvliet	End of contract	1 July 2012	Pre-season	(Netherlands) Marcel Keizer	1 July 2012
FC Volendam	(Netherlands) Johan Steur	End of interim spell	1 July 2012	Pre-season	(Netherlands) Hans de Koning	1 July 2012
FC Dordrecht	(Netherlands) Theo Bos	Sick leave	14 July 2012	Pre-season	(Netherlands) Harry van den Ham (interim)	26 July 2012

== League table ==
Pos	Team	Pld	W	D	L	GF	GA	GD	Pts	Promotion or qualification
1	Cambuur (C, P)	30	19	4	7	59	33	+26	61	Promotion to the Eredivisie
2	Volendam	30	19	3	8	70	43	+27	60	Qualification for promotion play-offs Second Round
3	Sparta Rotterdam	30	16	7	7	59	36	+23	55	Qualification for promotion play-offs Second Round
4	Helmond Sport	30	15	10	5	55	45	+10	55	Qualification for promotion play-offs Second Round
5	MVV	30	14	8	8	56	44	+12	50	Qualification for promotion play-offs Second Round
6	Go Ahead Eagles (P)	30	13	9	8	60	46	+14	48	Qualification for promotion play-offs First Round
7	Fortuna Sittard	30	13	7	10	39	33	+6	46	Qualification for promotion play-offs First Round
8	De Graafschap	30	12	9	9	57	41	+16	45	Qualification for promotion play-offs First Round
9	Dordrecht	30	11	7	12	56	56	0	40	Qualification for promotion play-offs First Round
10	Oss	30	10	7	13	40	57	−17	37	
11	Den Bosch	30	10	5	15	38	49	−11	35	
12	Emmen	30	8	8	14	38	52	−14	32	
13	Almere City	30	10	1	19	41	67	−26	31	
14	Telstar	30	7	8	15	31	46	−15	29	
15	Excelsior	30	4	9	17	39	63	−24	21	
16	Eindhoven	30	5	6	19	40	67	−27	21	
17	Veendam (D, R)	0	0	0	0	0	0	0	0 (Note: Veendam were officially declared bankrupt on 2 April 2013.)	Club expelled in 2 April 2013
18	AGOVV (R, D)	0	0	0	0	0	0	0	0 (Note: AGOVV were initially deducted two points for entering administration, but were later expelled on 18 January 2013 and their record was expunged on the same day.)	Club expelled in 18 January 2013

Source: Eerste Divisie (in Dutch)
Rules for classification: 1) points; 2) goal difference; 3) number of goals scored.
(C) Champions; (D) Disqualified; (P) Promoted; (R) Relegated

== Playoffs ==
Roda JC and VVV-Venlo joined the Eerste Divisie-teams for the playoffs, after finishing 16th and 17th in the Eredivisie.

=== Round 1 ===
Team 1	Agg.	Team 2	1st leg	2nd leg
FC Dordrecht	3–6	Go Ahead Eagles	3–3	0–3
De Graafschap	5–2	Fortuna Sittard	2–1	3–1

=== Round 2 ===
Team 1	Agg.	Team 2	1st leg	2nd leg
Go Ahead Eagles	4–0	VVV-Venlo	1–0	3–0
MVV Maastricht	1–4	FC Volendam	0–1	1–3
Helmond Sport	3–5	Sparta Rotterdam	2–4	1–1
De Graafschap	2-7	Roda JC	1–1	1–6

=== Round 3 ===
Team 1	Agg.	Team 2	1st leg	2nd leg
Go Ahead Eagles	3–1	FC Volendam	3–0	0–1
Sparta Rotterdam	1–2	Roda JC	0–0	1-2

Both winners qualify for 2013–14 Eredivisie.

== Attendances ==
#	Club	Average
1	De Graafschap	7,799
2	Sparta	7,064
3	Cambuur	5,805
4	MVV	5,195
5	Go Ahead	4,529
6	Fortuna	4,065
7	Den Bosch	3,818
8	Volendam	3,287
9	Helmond	3,021
10	Veendam	2,966
11	Eindhoven	2,488
12	Emmen	2,411
13	Excelsior	2,288
14	Dordrecht	2,278
15	AGOVV	2,069
16	Oss	1,843
17	Telstar	1,685
18	Almere	1,139
