= 2011–12 Eerste Divisie =

56th season of the second-tier football league in Netherlands

Eerste Divisie
- Season: 2011–12
- Champions: FC Zwolle
- Promoted: Willem II
- Relegated: none
- Top goalscorer: Jack Tuijp

The 2011–12 Eerste Divisie, known as Jupiler League for sponsorship reasons, was the fifty-sixth season of Eerste Divisie since its establishment in 1955. It began in August 2011 with the first matches of the season and ended in June 2012 with the nacompetitie, a promotion-and-relegation tournament also involving the 16th- and 17th-placed teams from the 2011–12 Eredivisie. The competition was won by FC Zwolle on 13 April 2012, after drawing FC Eindhoven 0–0 at home in their 32nd match of the season.

On 1 March 2012, the Dutch football federation confirmed that no team would be relegated from the league at the end of the season, after all the 2011–12 Topklasse teams had decided against being eligible for promotion to the Eerste Divisie.

== Teams ==
A total of 18 teams took part in the league. Willem II were relegated as bottom-placed team in the 2010–11 Eredivisie, whereas FC Oss were promoted as 2010–11 Topklasse runners-up, as champions IJsselmeervogels opted to keep playing at amateur level instead. Following the disbandment and consequent exclusion of RBC Roosendaal in June 2011, last-placed 2010–11 Eerste Divisie club Almere City FC were readmitted in the league to fill the vacancy.

The season also saw the participation of the old BV Veendam under their new denomination of SC Veendam.

Location of teams in the Eerste Divisie 2011-2012

Club	Location	Venue	Capacity
AGOVV Apeldoorn	Apeldoorn	Stadion Berg & Bos	3,250
Almere City FC	Almere	Mitsubishi Forklift Stadion	3,000
Cambuur	Leeuwarden	Cambuur Stadion	10,250
FC Den Bosch	's-Hertogenbosch	De Vliert	9,000
FC Dordrecht	Dordrecht	GN Bouw Stadion	4,100
FC Eindhoven	Eindhoven	Jan Louwers Stadion	4,600
FC Emmen	Emmen	Univé Stadion	8,600
Fortuna Sittard	Sittard	Wagner & Partners Stadion	12,500
Go Ahead Eagles	Deventer	Adelaarshorst	6,700
Helmond Sport	Helmond	Stadion De Braak	4,100
MVV	Maastricht	De Geusselt	11,026
FC Oss	Oss	Heesen Yachts Stadion	4,700
Sparta Rotterdam	Rotterdam	Het Kasteel	11,026
Telstar	Velsen	TATA Steel Stadion	3,625
SC Veendam	Veendam	De Langeleegte	5,290
FC Volendam	Volendam	Kras Stadion	6,260
Willem II	Tilburg	Koning Willem II Stadion	14,637
FC Zwolle	Zwolle	FC Zwolle Stadion	10,000

=== Managerial changes ===
Team	Outgoing manager	Manner of departure	Date of vacancy	Position in table	Replaced by	Date of appointment
AGOVV Apeldoorn	(Netherlands) Hans de Koning	Mutual consent	1 July 2011	Pre-season	(Netherlands) Hans van Arum	1 July 2011
FC Dordrecht	(Netherlands) Henny Lee	Signed by FC Utrecht	1 July 2011	Pre-season	(Netherlands) Theo Bos	1 July 2011
Go Ahead Eagles	(Netherlands) Andries Ulderink	Signed by De Graafschap	1 July 2011	Pre-season	(Netherlands) Joop Gall	1 July 2011
Helmond Sport	(Netherlands) Jurgen Streppel	Signed by Willem II	1 July 2011	Pre-season	(Netherlands) Hans de Koning	1 July 2011
Sparta Rotterdam	(Netherlands) Jos van Eck	End of interim spell	1 July 2011	Pre-season	(Netherlands) Michel Vonk	1 July 2011
SC Veendam	(Netherlands) Joop Gall	Signed by Go Ahead Eagles	1 July 2011	Pre-season	(Netherlands) Gert Heerkes	1 July 2011
Willem II	(Netherlands) John Feskens	End of interim spell	1 July 2011	Pre-season	(Netherlands) Jurgen Streppel	1 July 2011
Fortuna Sittard	(Netherlands) Wim Dusseldorp	Signed by VVV-Venlo	28 December 2011	14th	(Netherlands) Tiny Ruys	29 December 2011
FC Dordrecht	(Netherlands) Theo Bos	Sick leave	7 January 2012		(Netherlands) Virgil Breetveld (interim)	7 January 2012
FC Volendam	(Netherlands) Gert Kruys	Gardening leave	6 March 2012	13th	(Netherlands) Johan Steur (interim)	6 March 2012
FC Eindhoven	(Netherlands) Ernest Faber	Hired by PSV Eindhoven	14 March 2012	2nd	(Netherlands) Erwin Koeman	17 March 2012
Go Ahead Eagles	(Netherlands) Joop Gall	Resigned	24 March 2012	11th	(Scotland) Jimmy Calderwood (interim)	30 March 2012
AGOVV Apeldoorn	(Netherlands) Hans van Arum	Removed from managerial duties	26 April 2012	17th	(Netherlands) Marco Heering (interim)	26 April 2012

== League table ==
Pos	Team	Pld	W	D	L	GF	GA	GD	Pts	Promotion or relegation
1	Zwolle (C, P)	34	22	6	6	68	34	+34	72	Promotion to 2012–13 Eredivisie
2	Sparta Rotterdam	34	19	8	7	59	32	+27	65	Qualification for promotion play-offs Second Round
3	Eindhoven	34	18	9	7	52	33	+19	63	Qualification for promotion play-offs Second Round
4	Helmond Sport	34	18	8	8	62	50	+12	62	Qualification for promotion play-offs Second Round
5	Willem II (P)	34	17	7	10	67	41	+26	58	Qualification for promotion play-offs Second Round
6	Den Bosch	34	16	9	9	57	32	+25	57	Qualification for promotion play-offs First Round
7	Cambuur	34	16	8	10	68	44	+24	56	Qualification for promotion play-offs First Round
8	MVV	34	14	9	11	59	55	+4	51	Qualification for promotion play-offs First Round
9	Go Ahead Eagles	34	14	8	12	65	56	+9	50	Qualification for promotion play-offs First Round
10	Dordrecht	34	13	11	10	56	62	−6	50	
11	Fortuna Sittard	34	13	9	12	62	51	+11	48	
12	Volendam	34	14	6	14	57	55	+2	48	
13	Almere City	34	11	7	16	52	62	−10	40	
14	Oss	34	10	5	19	56	76	−20	35	
15	Telstar	34	9	5	20	45	70	−25	32	
16	Veendam	34	4	10	20	42	67	−25	22	
17	AGOVV	34	5	4	25	36	94	−58	19	
18	Emmen (Note: Emmen deducted six points due to financial irregularities.)	34	6	5	23	24	73	−49	17	

Source: Eerste divisie (official site) (in Dutch)
Rules for classification: 1) points; 2) goal difference; 3) number of goals scored.
(C) Champions; (P) Promoted

== Results ==
Home \ Away	AGO	ALM	CAM	DBO	DOR	EIN	EMM	FOR	GAE	HEL	MVV	OSS	SPA	TEL	VEE	VOL	WIL	ZWO
AGOVV		1–1	2–4	2–3	2–3	0–0	0–1	2–4	3–1	0–3	1–1	3–2	0–6	2–3	3–2	1–2	2–1	0–4
Almere City	4–1		1–1	1–3	5–0	1–3	2–0	1–4	0–2	2–1	1–2	3–2	1–1	2–1	3–0	2–1	1–4	0–3
Cambuur	2–0	3–0		1–0	4–0	0–1	2–1	3–1	1–1	2–2	5–1	4–2	1–2	3–1	5–1	4–1	0–2	3–0
Den Bosch	4–0	2–0	1–1		0–0	0–2	5–1	1–1	1–2	0–0	3–0	1–0	0–1	3–0	3–0	1–2	1–0	2–2
Dordrecht	4–0	2–1	2–1	4–3		2–1	3–0	2–2	3–1	3–2	3–3	3–2	3–2	2–0	2–2	0–0	3–2	1–2
Eindhoven	3–2	0–2	1–1	2–2	1–0		3–0	4–3	1–0	0–0	4–1	2–0	0–2	3–1	2–0	2–0	2–3	2–2
Emmen	1–0	2–2	2–1	1–2	1–1	0–1		0–4	3–2	0–1	2–1	1–3	1–1	0–2	0–2	0–4	0–2	1–2
Fortuna Sittard	5–1	0–0	0–0	2–2	2–0	0–1	4–1		1–1	0–1	2–0	2–1	1–0	2–5	1–0	3–2	3–1	0–1
Go Ahead Eagles	3–1	2–2	4–1	1–1	4–2	1–3	1–0	2–1		2–3	2–1	7–2	1–2	1–0	2–2	5–0	1–3	0–1
Helmond Sport	1–0	2–0	1–3	1–0	2–1	0–1	0–1	2–2	5–1		2–2	2–1	3–2	3–2	3–2	1–0	0–7	3–1
MVV	2–2	3–2	2–0	1–4	1–1	1–0	6–0	3–1	1–2	3–3		3–1	1–1	1–0	2–1	3–0	3–1	1–3
Oss	1–0	3–4	3–2	0–2	3–3	1–0	1–1	1–3	5–3	3–1	0–2		1–5	3–1	4–4	1–3	1–1	1–0
Sparta Rotterdam	4–1	2–1	2–0	2–0	2–0	2–2	1–1	1–0	4–1	0–3	0–0	2–2		1–0	2–1	0–0	2–1	2–0
Telstar	1–3	3–1	2–5	0–0	3–0	1–1	2–1	2–1	0–2	0–3	2–3	2–1	0–2		1–1	2–2	1–0	0–3
Veendam	4–0	1–1	1–1	1–2	1–1	1–2	3–0	2–2	0–4	1–1	1–3	1–2	1–2	1–1		1–0	1–3	0–1
Volendam	6–1	3–1	1–4	0–2	1–1	3–1	3–1	3–2	2–2	3–1	2–0	1–2	1–0	4–1	3–2		1–2	2–2
Willem II	5–0	1–2	0–0	0–3	1–1	1–1	5–0	1–1	1–1	3–3	2–1	2–0	2–1	3–2	3–1	1–0		3–1
Zwolle	3–0	3–2	3–0	1–0	5–0	0–0	1–0	4–2	0–0	2–3	1–1	2–1	2–0	7–3	2–0	3–1	1–0	

Source: Eerste Divisie website
Legend: Blue = home team win; Yellow = draw; Red = away team win.

== Playoffs ==
VVV-Venlo and De Graafschap joined the Eerste Divisie-teams for the playoffs, after finishing 16th and 17th in the Eredivisie.

=== Round 1 ===
Team 1	Agg.	Team 2	1st leg	2nd leg
Go Ahead Eagles	1–3	Den Bosch	1−1	0–2
MVV	1–2	Cambuur	0−2	1–0

=== Round 2 ===
Team 1	Agg.	Team 2	1st leg	2nd leg
Den Bosch	1–1	De Graafschap	0–0	1–1
Willem II	3–2	Sparta Rotterdam	2–1	1–1
Helmond Sport	3–0	Eindhoven	1–0	2–0
Cambuur	3–4	VVV-Venlo	0–0	3–4

=== Round 3 ===
Team 1	Agg.	Team 2	1st leg	2nd leg
Den Bosch	1–2	Willem II	0–0	1–2
Helmond Sport	3–4	VVV-Venlo	1–2	2–2

== Top goalscorers ==
Updated 27 January 2012

17 goals

- (Netherlands) Jack Tuyp (FC Volendam)

12 goals

- (Netherlands) Nassir Maachi (FC Zwolle)

11 goals

- (Netherlands) Erik Bakker (SC Cambuur)
- (Netherlands) Marcel van der Sloot (FC Oss)

10 goals

- (Netherlands) Donny de Groot (Willem II)
- (Netherlands) Anco Jansen (SC Veendam)

9 goals

- (Germany) Christopher Bieber (FC Oss)
- (Netherlands) Jeremy Bokila (Sparta Rotterdam)
- (Cape Verde) Cecilio Lopes (FC Dordrecht)
- (Netherlands) Johan Plat (Telstar)
- (Netherlands) Tom van Weert (FC Den Bosch)

== Attendances ==
#	Club	Average
1	Willem II	9,547
2	Zwolle	8,557
3	Sparta	7,089
4	Cambuur	5,560
5	MVV	5,409
6	Go Ahead	4,850
7	Fortuna	4,788
8	Den Bosch	4,064
9	Volendam	3,286
10	Veendam	3,124
11	Eindhoven	2,990
12	Helmond	2,806
13	Emmen	2,348
14	AGOVV	2,315
15	Dordrecht	2,212
16	Oss	2,115
17	Telstar	2,075
18	Almere	1,377
