= Paredes (parish) =

- Civil parish
- Location in Portugal
- Coordinates: 41.206°N 8.330°W
- Country: Portugal
- Region: Norte
- Metropolitan area: Porto
- District: Porto
- Municipality: Paredes

Area
  - Total: 21.51 km^{2} (8.31 sq mi)

Population (2011)
  - Total: 19,834
  - Density: 920/km^{2} (2,400/sq mi)
- Time zone: UTC+00:00 (WET)
  - Summer (DST): UTC+01:00 (WEST)

Paredes is a city and a civil parish in the municipality of Paredes, Portugal. It was formed in 2013 by the merger of the former parishes Castelões de Cepeda, Mouriz, Vila Cova de Carros, Madalena, Besteiros, Gondalães and Bitarães. The population in 2011 was 19,834, in an area of 21.51 km².
