= Akbar Hermawan =

Indonesian footballer

Personal information
- Full name: Akbar Hermawan
- Date of birth: 29 July 1998 (age 28)
- Place of birth: Takalar, Indonesia
- Height: 1.72 m (5 ft 8 in)
- Position: Midfielder

Team information
- Current team: Persiba Balikpapan
- Number: 67

Youth career
- 2016: PSM Makassar
- 2017: Sidrap United
- 2018–2019: Gasta Takalar
- 2020: Alesha

Senior career*
Years	Team	Apps	(Gls)
2021–2022	Persela Lamongan	19	(2)
2024	RANS Nusantara	0	(0)
2024–2025	Persikabo 1973	6	(0)
2025–2026	Persiba Bantul	14	(0)
2026–	Persiba Balikpapan	1	(0)
- * Club domestic league appearances and goals as of 13 September 2026

Akbar Hermawan (born 29 July 1998) is an Indonesian professional footballer who plays as a midfielder for Championship club Persiba Balikpapan.

== Club career ==
=== Persela Lamongan ===
He was signed for Persela Lamongan to play in Liga 1 in the 2021 season. Akbar made his first-team debut on 4 September 2021 in a match against PSIS Semarang at the Wibawa Mukti Stadium, Cikarang.

== Career statistics ==
=== Club ===
As of 13 September 2026.

Club	Season	League			Cup		Continental		Other		Total	
Club	Season	Division	Apps	Goals	Apps	Goals	Apps	Goals	Apps	Goals	Apps	Goals
Persela Lamongan	2021	Liga 1	13	0	0	0	–		4 (Note: Appearances in Menpora Cup)	1	17	1
Persela Lamongan	2022	Liga 2	6	2	0	0	–		0	0	6	2
RANS Nusantara	2024–25	Liga 2	0	0	0	0	–		0	0	0	0
Persikabo 1973	2024–25	Liga 2	6	0	0	0	–		0	0	6	0
Persiba Bantul	2025–26	Liga Nusantara	14	0	0	0	–		0	0	14	0
Persiba Balikpapan	2026–27	Championship	1	0	0	0	–		0	0	1	0
Career total			40	2	0	0	0	0	4	1	44	3
