= Kim Jin-seong =

- Hangul: 김진성
- RR: Gim Jinseong
- MR: Kim Chinsŏng

Kim Jin-seong or Kim Jin-sung may refer to:

- Kim Jin-seong (actor)
- Kim Jin-sung (baseball)
- Kim Jin-sung (footballer, born 1999)
- Kim Jin-sung (footballer, born 1997)
