= Vitinho (footballer, born May 1993) =

Brazilian footballer

Personal information
- Full name: Victor Guilherme dos Santos Carvalho
- Date of birth: 10 May 1993 (age 33)
- Place of birth: Rio de Janeiro, Brazil
- Height: 1.74 m (5 ft 9 in)
- Position: Winger

Youth career
- 2010: Fênix
- 2011: Fluminense

Senior career*
Years	Team	Apps	(Gls)
2012	Tigres do Brasil	0	(0)
2013	Ceilândia	0	(0)
2014–2016	Raków Częstochowa	5	(0)
2017	Luziânia	3	(0)
2017	Eléctrico	8	(0)
2017–2018	Praiense	16	(1)
2018–2019	Mirandela	19	(3)
2019	Vizela	13	(1)
2019–2020	Cova da Piedade	22	(1)
2020–2021	Vilafranquense	21	(0)
2021	Motor Lublin	17	(0)
2022	Barra	8	(1)
2022	Vitória de Setúbal	6	(0)
2023–2024	PSIS Semarang	25	(2)
- * Club domestic league appearances and goals as of 5 February 2024

Victor Guilherme dos Santos Carvalho (born 10 May 1993), commonly known as Vitinho, is a Brazilian professional footballer who plays as a winger.

== Career statistics ==
=== Club ===
As of 5 February 2024

Club	Season	League			National Cup		League Cup		Other		Total	
Club	Season	Division	Apps	Goals	Apps	Goals	Apps	Goals	Apps	Goals	Apps	Goals
Ceilândia	2013	–			1 (Note: Appearances in the Copa do Brasil)	0	–		0	0	1	0
Raków Częstochowa	2013–14	II liga	4	0	0	0	–		0	0	4	0
Raków Częstochowa	2014–15	II liga	0	0	0	0	–		0	0	0	0
Raków Częstochowa	2015–16	II liga	1	0	0	0	–		0	0	1	0
Raków Częstochowa	Total		5	0	1	0	0	0	0	0	6	0
Luziânia	2017	Série D	3	0	0	0	–		0	0	3	0
Eléctrico	2017–18	Campeonato de Portugal	8	0	2 (Note: Appearances in the Taça de Portugal)	0	–		0	0	10	0
Praiense	2017–18	Campeonato de Portugal	16	1	1	0	–		0	0	17	1
Mirandela	2018–19	Campeonato de Portugal	19	3	3	0	–		0	0	22	3
Vizela	2018–19	Campeonato de Portugal	13	1	0	0	–		0	0	13	1
Cova da Piedade	2019–20	LigaPro	22	1	2	0	1 (Note: Appearances in the Taça da Liga)	0	0	0	25	1
Vilafranquense	2020–21	Liga Portugal 2	21	0	1	0	0	0	0	0	22	0
Motor Lublin	2021–22	II liga	17	0	3 (Note: Appearances in the Polish Cup)	0	0	0	0	0	20	0
Barra	2022	Campeonato Catarinense	8	1	0	0	0	0	0	0	8	1
Vitória de Setúbal	2022–23	Liga 3	6	0	1	0	0	0	0	0	7	0
PSIS Semarang	2022–23	Liga 1	10	1	–		–		0	0	10	1
PSIS Semarang	2023–24	Liga 1	15	1	–		–		0	0	15	1
Career total			163	9	14	0	1	0	0	0	178	9
