= Tolak Angin =

Herbal supplement product

- A 15ml sachet of Tolak Angin
- Product type: Herbal medicine
- Produced by: Sido Muncul
- Country: Indonesia
- Tagline: Orang Pintar Minum Tolak Angin lit. 'Smart People Drink Tolak Angin'
- Website: Official website

Tolak Angin (literally "Reject Wind") is a jamu herbal medicine dietary supplement produced in Indonesia by Sido Muncul. Sold as a syrup packaged in yellow sachets, it is one of the most popular brands in Indonesia.

== Product ==
The product contains, as ingredients, ginger, wild mint, fennel, cumin, screw tree, cloves, and honey, with a claimed secret recipe. It is typically sold in sachets, priced at less than $0.25 each in 2014. Generally, it is consumed in Indonesia by people experiencing masuk angin or common cold – a general description for common ailments resulting in weakened immune systems. Several variants are manufactured, including sugar-free and child-oriented variants, and separate products such as Tolak Angin branded candies and ointment.

== Brand ==
In Indonesia, Tolak Angin is ubiquitously used and is one of the most popular consumer brands, with the product being sold by millions of small vendors. The product is well-recognized because of its yellow sachet packaging, which has been copied by similar products of competitors. The brand's slogan is "Orang pintar minum Tolak Angin" (lit. '"Smart people take Tolak Angin'").

Outside of Indonesia, Tolak Angin is also sold in, for example, Philippines, Malaysia, Nigeria, Hong Kong, Australia, the Netherlands, and the United States. Exports outside Indonesia comprised around 5 percent of the product's sales in 2014. In 2016, it was reported that the annual production of the product was at 780 million sachets.

== History ==
The mixture was reportedly first developed by Rahmat Sulistyo in 1930 as a family recipe. It was first sold to the public at Yogyakarta in 1940 as a premixed jamu, although due to the Indonesian National Revolution the family moved to Semarang. There in 1951, the company Sido Muncul was founded. It was sold as a regular jamu until 1992, when it adopted 15 ml sachets as packaging instead. The product is also sold in powder sachets.

In 2015, Tolak Angin sachets sold in California were given Prop 65 warnings which indicated that they contained lead. The distributor later clarified that the warnings were due to "abundance of caution".

Sido Muncul opened a new production facility for Tolak Angin at Ungaran, Semarang in 2018 with a production capacity of 200 million sachets per month, compared to 80 million in its prior facility.
