= Zé Valente =

Portuguese footballer

Personal information
- Full name: José Pedro Magalhães Valente
- Date of birth: 14 May 1994 (age 32)
- Place of birth: Castelões de Cepeda, Portugal
- Height: 1.80 m (5 ft 11 in)
- Position: Attacking midfielder

Team information
- Current team: PSIM Yogyakarta
- Number: 10

Youth career
- 2002−2012: Paredes
- 2012−2013: Paços Ferreira

Senior career*
Years	Team	Apps	(Gls)
2012	Paredes	3	(0)
2013–2017	Aves	48	(3)
2017–2019	Vizela	48	(21)
2019–2020	Doxa	16	(0)
2020–2021	Estoril	24	(2)
2021–2022	Penafiel	29	(0)
2022	PSS Sleman	14	(1)
2023–2024	Persebaya Surabaya	29	(6)
2023–2024	→ Persik Kediri (loan)	15	(1)
2024–2025	Persik Kediri	28	(9)
2025–	PSIM Yogyakarta	33	(10)
- * Club domestic league appearances and goals as of 5 September 2026

José Pedro Magalhães Valente (born 14 May 1994 in Castelões de Cepeda, Paredes), commonly known as Zé Valente, is a Portuguese professional footballer who plays as an attacking midfielder for Super League club PSIM Yogyakarta.

== Honours ==
Estoril

- Liga Portugal 2: 2020–21
