= Gasta Takalar =

Indonesian football club

- Full name: Gabungan Sepakbola Takalar
- Nickname: Laskar Lipan Bajeng (The Bajeng Centipedes)
- Founded: 1980; 46 years ago
- Ground: Ranggong Stadium; Takalar Regency, South Sulawesi
- Capacity: 3,000
- Owner: Askab PSSI Takalar
- Coach: Syamsul Chaeruddin
- League: Liga 4
- 2021: 5th, (South Sulawesi zone)
Home colours	Away colours

Gabungan Sepakbola Takalar or Gasta is an Indonesian football club based in Takalar Regency, South Sulawesi. Club played in Liga 4.

== Players ==
As of 4 September 2021

Note: Flags indicate national team as defined under FIFA eligibility rules; some limited exceptions apply. Players may hold more than one non-FIFA nationality.

No.	Pos.	Nation	Player
—	GK	IDN	Teguh Wardana
—	GK	IDN	Anugerah Halil
—	GK	IDN	Arwal Assyad
—	DF	IDN	Awal Musyawwir
—	DF	IDN	Ari Ashari Handam
—	DF	IDN	Juswan
—	DF	IDN	Arianto
—	DF	IDN	Maxban
—	DF	IDN	Ilham Maulana
—	DF	IDN	Hasbullah
—	DF	IDN	Saddan
—	DF	IDN	Taufiq
—	DF	IDN	Gilang Ramadhan

No.	Pos.	Nation	Player
—	MF	IDN	M. Arfian
—	MF	IDN	Reza Rifki Irawan
—	MF	IDN	Ardiansyah
—	MF	IDN	Ainul Yaqien
—	MF	IDN	Jusman Jonatan
—	MF	IDN	Dwiki Z.P.
6	MF	IDN	Aan Sesario
—	FW	IDN	Zulkipli
—	FW	IDN	Zulfahri Kasim
—	FW	IDN	Sahar
—	FW	IDN	Muh. Agus Saputra
—	FW	IDN	Randy
—	FW	IDN	M. Aswandi
