= Henrique Motta =

Brazilian footballer (born 1991)

Personal information
- Full name: Henrique Marcelino Motta
- Date of birth: 10 January 1991 (age 35)
- Place of birth: Cravinhos, Brazil
- Height: 1.88 m (6 ft 2 in)
- Position: Centre-back

Youth career
- 2010: Votoraty

Senior career*
Years	Team	Apps	(Gls)
2010–2011	Comercial	3	(0)
2012–2014	Duque de Caxias	13	(2)
2014	Rio Branco	12	(0)
2014–2016	Mogi Mirim	34	(1)
2017	São Bento	0	(0)
2017	Mogi Mirim	2	(0)
2017–2018	Hoang Anh Gia Lai	8	(2)
2018	Olímpia	5	(0)
2018–2019	Portuguesa	6	(0)
2019	URT	6	(0)
2019–2020	Penapolense	10	(0)
2020–2021	Żejtun Corinthians	6	(0)
2021	Persipura Jayapura	6	(0)
2022	Sirens	10	(1)
2022	Żejtun Corinthians	13	(1)
2023	Zebbug Rangers	11	(1)
2024–2025	Melita	14	(1)
- * Club domestic league appearances and goals as of 00:10, 18 November 2025 (UTC)

Henrique Marcelino Motta (born 10 January 1991) is a Brazilian professional footballer who plays as a centre-back.

== Career ==
Motta started his career with Votoraty in 2010. In 2012, Motta joined Campeonato Paulista Série A3 club Comercial and appeared in three matches in the League.

He then signed with teams in the Brazilian League such as Duque de Caxias in 2014, Rio Branco in 2015, Mogi Mirim from 2015 to 2016 and São Bento in 2017. He briefly rejoined Mogi Morim in the same year.

=== Hoang Anh Gia Lai ===
In 2017, Motta signed a one-year contract with V.League 1 club Hoang Anh Gia Lai on a free transfer. and made his league debut for HAGL on 28 June in a 2–1 win against Becamex Binh Duong.

=== Persipura Jayapura ===
On 23 May 2021, Motta signed a one-year contract with Indonesian Liga 1 club Persipura Jayapura on a free transfer. On 29 September, Motta made his first league debut in a 1–0 loss against Arema as a substitute for Ricardo Salampessy in the 40th minute at the Gelora Bung Karno Madya Stadium.
