= Leonardo Medina (Mexican football manager) =

Mexican football manager (born 1970)

Personal information
- Full name: Leonardo Medina Arellano
- Date of birth: 30 October 1970 (age 55)
- Place of birth: Mexico City, Mexico

Managerial career
- Years: Team
- 2019–2023: Johor Darul Ta'zim (Assistant coach)
- 2023: Persis Solo

Leonardo Medina Arellano (born 30 October 1970) is a Mexican football manager who manages Persis Solo.

== Early life ==
Medina was born in 1970 in Mexico City, Mexico.

== Career ==
Medina worked as assistant manager of Malaysian side JDT, helping the club win the league.

== Personal life ==
Medina obtained a UEFA Pro License.

== Managerial statistics ==
As of match played 9 December 2023

Managerial record by team and tenure
Team	From	To	Record				
Team	From	To	P	W	D	L	Win %
Persis	6 December 2022	9 December 2023	35	12	11	12	34.3
Total			35	12	11	12	34.3
