= Tallysson Duarte =

Brazilian footballer

Personal information
- Full name: Tallysson Lucas Souza Duarte Vasconcelos
- Date of birth: 17 July 1995 (age 31)
- Place of birth: Brazil
- Height: 1.83 m (6 ft 0 in)
- Position: Centre-back

Team information
- Current team: Hidd Club

Senior career*
Years	Team	Apps	(Gls)
2017–2020	União Rondonópolis	12	(0)
2020–2022	Al-Fahaheel		
2022	Al-Sahel		
2022–2023	PSS Sleman	11	(2)
2024–	Hidd Club	0	(0)
- * Club domestic league appearances and goals as of 10 January 2023

Tallysson Lucas Souza Duarte Vasconcelos or simply Tallysson (born 17 July 1995) is a Brazilian professional footballer who plays as a centre-back. for Bahraini Premier League club Hidd Club.
