= Besteiros (Paredes) =

- Civil parish
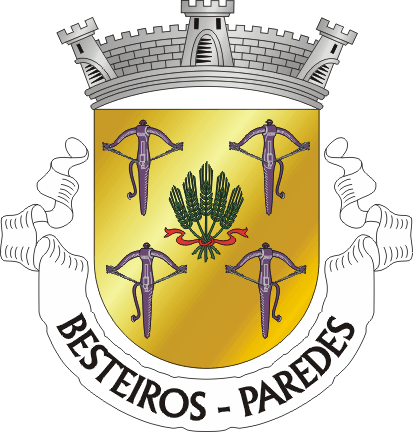
- Coat of arms

- Location in Portugal
- Coordinates: 41.219°N 8.350°W
- Country: Portugal
- Region: Norte
- Metropolitan area: Porto
- District: Porto
- Municipality: Paredes
- Disbanded: 2013

Area
  - Total: 2.13 km^{2} (0.82 sq mi)

Population (2011)
  - Total: 1,448
  - Density: 680/km^{2} (1,800/sq mi)
- Time zone: UTC+00:00 (WET)
  - Summer (DST): UTC+01:00 (WEST)

Besteiros is a former civil parish in the municipality of Paredes, Portugal. In 2013, the parish merged into the new parish Paredes. The population in 2011 was 1,448, in an area of 2.13 km².
