= Ibrahim Bahsoun =

Lebanese footballer

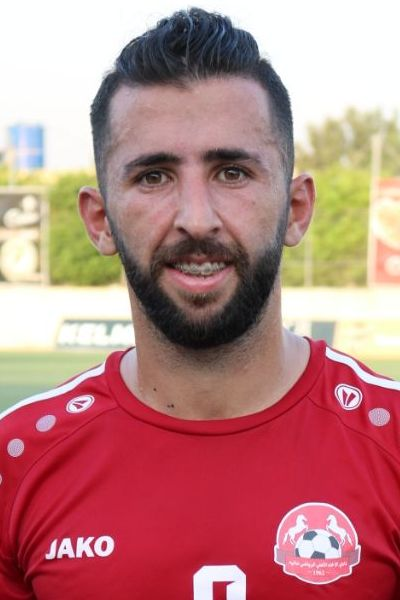
- Bahsoun with Akhaa Ahli Aley in 2020

Personal information
- Full name: Ibrahim Ali Bahsoun
- Date of birth: 1 January 1989 (age 37)
- Place of birth: Jwaya, Lebanon
- Height: 1.84 m (6 ft 0 in)
- Position: Forward

Senior career*
Years	Team	Apps	(Gls)
2009–2012	Tadamon Sour		
2012–2013	Nejmeh	4	(0)
2013	Al-Zawraa		
2013–2014	Nejmeh	5	(1)
2014–2015	Safa	10	(1)
2016	Al-Baqa'a		
2016–2018	Nabi Chit	38	(2)
2018–2019	Tripoli	10	(0)
2020–2021	Akhaa Ahli Aley	11	(2)
2021	Persik Kediri	2	(0)
2023	PSDS Deli Serdang		
2024–2025	Okhwa Kharayeb		
- * Club domestic league appearances and goals

Ibrahim Ali Bahsoun (Arabic: ابراهيم علي بحسون; born 1 January 1989) is a Lebanese former footballer who played as a forward.

== Club career ==
On 8 February 2013, Bahsoun joined Iraqi Premier League club Al-Zawraa. In January 2016, Bahsoun moved to Jordanian Pro League side Al-Baqa'a.

On 21 June 2021, Bahsoun moved to Persik Kediri in the Indonesian Liga 1. He made his debut on 27 August, as a starter in a 1–0 defeat to Bali United; he was subbed out in the 40th minute. Bahsoun's contract was ended on 2 November, after having played only two league games; the club cited family reasons behind the player's departure.

In November 2023, Bahsoun moved to PSDS Deli Serdang in the Liga 2.

== Honours ==
Nejmeh

- Lebanese Premier League: 2013–14
- Lebanese Elite Cup runner-up: 2013

Safa

- Lebanese Elite Cup runner-up: 2014
