= Castelões de Cepeda =

- Civil parish
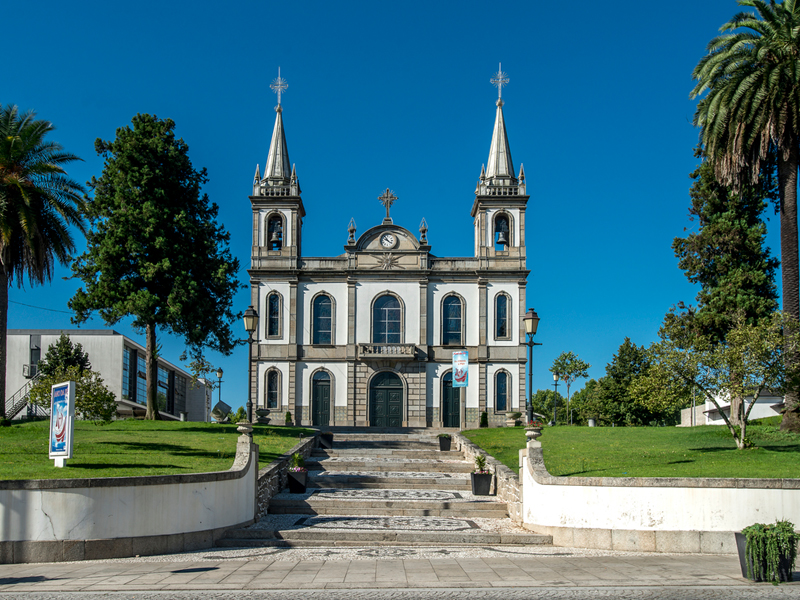
- Parish church in Castelões de Cepeda

- Location in Portugal
- Coordinates: 41.201°N 8.331°W
- Country: Portugal
- Region: Norte
- Metropolitan area: Porto
- District: Porto
- Municipality: Paredes
- Disbanded: 2013

Area
  - Total: 3.28 km^{2} (1.27 sq mi)

Population (2011)
  - Total: 8,755
  - Density: 2,670/km^{2} (6,910/sq mi)
- Time zone: UTC+00:00 (WET)
  - Summer (DST): UTC+01:00 (WEST)

Castelões de Cepeda is a former civil parish in the municipality of Paredes, Portugal. In 2013, the parish merged into the new parish Paredes. The population in 2011 was 8,755, in an area of 3.28 km². It contained the city centre of Paredes.
