= Arthur Silva (footballer, born 1990) =

Brazilian footballer

Arthur Félix
Personal information
- Full name: Arthur Félix Silva e Silva
- Date of birth: 20 February 1990 (age 36)
- Place of birth: Londrina, Brazil
- Height: 1.90 m (6 ft 3 in)
- Position: Centre-back

Youth career
- 2008: Paulista
- 2009: Cruzeiro

Senior career*
Years	Team	Apps	(Gls)
2010–2011	XV de Piracicaba	24	(2)
2012–2013	Barra Mansa	16	(2)
2013	Volta Redonda	3	(0)
2013–2014	Salgueiro Atlético	3	(0)
2014–2015	Icasa	4	(0)
2015–2016	Oman	21	(0)
2018–2019	Al-Qaisumah	8	(0)
2019	Al-Nahda Saudi	5	(0)
2019–2020	Al-Suwaiq	16	(0)
2021–2023	Persik Kediri	44	(1)
2023	Londrina	1	(0)
- * Club domestic league appearances and goals as of 26 February 2023

Arthur Félix Silva e Silva (born 20 February 1990) is a Brazilian professional footballer who plays as a centre-back.

== Career ==
=== Brazil ===
At the age of 19, Arthur was already played for Paulista in the Campeonato Paulista Segunda Divisão. In 2009, he joined Cruzeiro B and played for the team for two seasons.

He then played for several clubs in the Brazilian League, such as XV de Piracicaba, Barra Mansa, Volta Redonda, Salgueiro Atlético, and Icasa.

=== Middle East ===
In the 2015-2016 season, Arthur started his first career in the Asian League, especially in the Middle East. He joined Oman Professional League club Oman Club for three seasons.

After that, he often changed teams starting from Saudi Arabia club Al-Qaisumah, Al-Nahda, and returned to Oman to joined Suwaiq Club.

=== Indonesia ===
On 21 June 2021, Arthur moved to Indonesia. Arthur signed one-year contract with Indonesian Liga 1 club Persik Kediri. He made his debut on 27 August, as a starter in a 1–0 defeat to Bali United.

On 13 December 2022, Arthur scored his first goal for the club with the penalty kick in a 1–1 draw over Persebaya Surabaya.
