= Marco Heering =

Dutch footballer

Personal information
- Date of birth: 8 May 1970 (age 56)
- Place of birth: Apeldoorn, Netherlands
- Position: Winger

Youth career
- AGOVV Apeldoorn
- –1987: Vitesse

Senior career*
Years	Team	Apps	(Gls)
1987–1996	Go Ahead Eagles	184	(32)
1996–1998	Willem II	38	(6)
1998–2002	Fortuna Sittard	57	(5)
Total		279	(43)

Managerial career
- 2007: AGOVV (interim)
- 2012: AGOVV (interim)
- 2013-2018: Almere City (asst.)
- 2015: Almere City (interim)
- 2018-2020: Go Ahead Eagles (asst.)
- * Club domestic league appearances and goals

Marco Heering (born 8 May 1970) is a Dutch retired footballer who played as a forward for Go Ahead Eagles, Willem II and Fortuna Sittard.

== Career ==
Heering made his Eerste Divisie debut in March 1988 for Go Ahead Eagles against RBC and was part of the Deventer club's successful academy, playing alsongside the likes of Paul Bosvelt, Harry Decheiver and Marc Overmars. He would play 184 league games for the club. After a two-year spell at Willem II, he joined Fortuna Sittard in 1998.

He later worked as assistant manager at AGOVV and in the same position and as under-21 manager at Almere City and was named assistant to manager John Stegeman at Go Ahead Eagles in 2018. He joined FC Antwerp as a scout in 2022.
