= Kim Jin-sung (footballer, born 1997) =

Korean footballer

Personal information
- Full name: Kim Jin-sung
- Date of birth: 16 June 1997 (age 29)
- Place of birth: South Korea
- Height: 1.83 m (6 ft 0 in)
- Position: Centre-back

Team information
- Current team: Yeoju FC
- Number: 20

Youth career
- 2010–2015: Jeonnam Dragons
- 2016–2018: Hannam University

Senior career*
Years	Team	Apps	(Gls)
2019–2021	Jeonnam Dragons	4	(0)
2021	Madura United	15	(0)
2022	Barito Putera	13	(0)
2022	Paju Citizen	0	(0)
2023	Ulsan Citizen	12	(0)
2023	Changwon City	10	(0)
2024-	Yeoju FC	2	(0)
- * Club domestic league appearances and goals as of 9 September 2023

- Kim Jin-sung
- Hangul: 김진성
- Hanja: 金眞成
- RR: Gim Jinseong
- MR: Kim Chinsŏng

Kim Jin-sung (Korean: 김진성; born 16 June 1997) is a South Korean professional footballer who plays as a centre-back for K3 League club Yeoju FC.

== Career ==
=== Madura United ===
On 27 August 2021, Kim moved to Indonesia. He signed contract with Indonesian Liga 1 club Madura United. Kim made his debut on 12 September 2021 at Gelora Bung Karno Madya Stadium, as a starter, he provided an assist in a 1-1 league draw against PSM Makassar.

=== Barito Putera ===
In January 2022, Kim signed a contract with Liga 1 club Barito Putera. Kim made his league debut in a 3–0 lost against Bali United as a starter on 9 January 2022 at the Ngurah Rai Stadium, Denpasar.
