= Sido Muncul =

Indonesian herbal medicine company

PT Industri Jamu dan Farmasi Sido Muncul Tbk
- Type: Public
- Traded as: IDX: SIDO
- Industry: Herbs; Pharmaceuticals; Consumer goods
- Founded: 1940; 86 years ago Soerakarta, Central Java, Dutch East Indies
- Founder: Rakhmat Sulistio
- Headquarters: Semarang, Central Java, Indonesia
- Area served: Worldwide
- Key people: David Hidayat (CEO)
- Products: Herbal medicine, pharmaceuticals, weight management, dietary supplements, personal care, sports nutrition
- Revenue: ▲ Rp 3.3 trillion (2020)
- Net income: ▲ Rp 934 billion (2020)
- Total assets: ▲ Rp 3.8 trillion (2020)
- Total equity: ▲ Rp 3.2 trillion (2020)
- Owner: Hotel Candi Baru
- Number of employees: ▲4,088 (2019)
- Subsidiaries: Muncul Mekar; Semarang Herbal Indo Plant; Berlico Mulia Farma; Sido Muncul Pupuk Nusantara
- Website: www.sidomuncul.co.id

PT Industri Jamu dan Farmasi Sido Muncul Tbk, commonly known and doing business as Sido Muncul (lit. 'Dream comes True'), is an Indonesian herbal medicine and food products company based in Semarang, Indonesia, established in 1940. It produces and markets a variety of consumer products related to herbal medication, such as the jamu Tolak Angin.

== History ==
The company was founded in 1940 as a home business in Surakarta. Its founder, Rakhmat Sulistio, had formulated a recipe for a jamu, which she called "Tujuh Angin" (Seven Winds), later known as Tolak Angin (Reject Wind). Due to the Indonesian National Revolution, she moved to Semarang, where in 1951 she established production for the jamu in a house and later in a factory by 1953. It was in 1951 when the name "Sido Muncul" was adopted, and the product changed from liquid to powdered jamu. The firm was registered as a CV in 1970, and as a limited liability company (PT) in 1975.

In 1992, its primary product Tolak Angin began to be sold in sachets as a liquid, its current form. Sido Muncul launched a secondary line of energy drink products under the Kuku Bima Ener-G brand in 2004, at a time when the company was undergoing financial difficulties. Other lines of products outside of Tolak Angin were later launched, including candies, health drinks, and instant coffee. The company went public through an initial public offering at the Indonesian Stock Exchange on 18 December 2013, becoming the first herbal medicine company to list there. Six months after the IPO, the original founder's family held 81 percent of the company's shares.

Sido Muncul acquired Yogyakarta-based PT Berlico Mulia Farma, a pharmaceutical company which manufactured cough syrup, indigestion pills, and vitamins, in mid-2014, for Rp 125 billion. Sido Muncul's brands were then given to Berlico's products.
