= Hans de Koning =

Dutch footballer (born 1960)

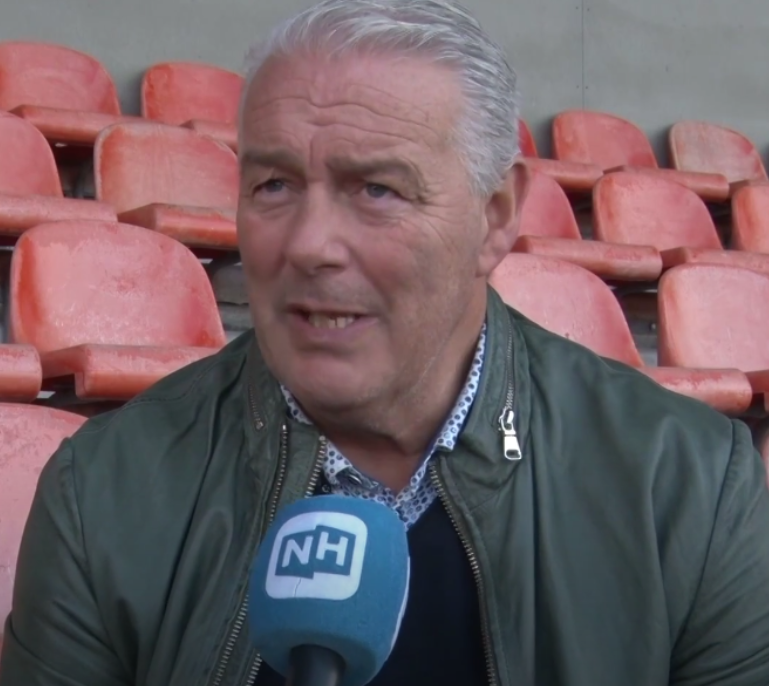
- de Koning in 2018

Personal information
- Date of birth: 5 April 1960 (age 66)
- Place of birth: Rotterdam, Netherlands
- Height: 1.94 m (6 ft 4 in)
- Position: Goalkeeper

Youth career
- RVV Blijdorp

Senior career*
| Years | Team | Apps | (Gls) |
| 1978–1988 | AZ'67/AZ | 147 | (0) |
| 1988–1993 | Twente | 140 | (0) |
| Total | | 287 | (0) |

Managerial career
- 1993–1996: Twente (goalkeeper coach)
- 1996–1997: AZ (assistant)
- 1997: AZ (interim)
- 1997–2000: AZ (goalkeeper coach)
- 2000–2001: Fortuna Sittard (assistant)
- 2000: Fortuna Sittard (interim)
- 2001–2004: Fortuna Sittard
- 2005: Dordrecht
- 2005–2010: TOP Oss/FC Oss
- 2010–2011: AGOVV Apeldoorn
- 2011–2012: Helmond Sport
- 2012–2015: Volendam
- 2016–2017: Go Ahead Eagles
- 2018: RKC Waalwijk
- 2018–2019: Volendam
- 2019–2021: VVV-Venlo
- * Club domestic league appearances and goals

Hans de Koning (Dutch pronunciation: [ˈɦɑnz də ˈkoːnɪŋ]; born 5 April 1960) is a Dutch professional football manager and former player. De Koning played as a goalkeeper.

== Playing career ==
De Koning played for AZ'67 for ten years, before moving to Twente, where he became known as "Hansje de King" (Hans the King) and played 140 games in five seasons with the club. He was forced to retire in 1993 after suffering a serious injury during Fred Rutten's farewell match.

== Managerial career ==
After retiring as a player, De Koning then became a goalkeeping coach for his former club AZ, also serving briefly as joint caretaker in 1997, and later on moved into head management at Eerste Divisie, making his debut at such role with Limburgish club Fortuna Sittard. De Koning then briefly served as interim coach of Dordrecht from March to July 2005 before being appointed at TOP Oss later that year until June 2010 when he was removed after he failed to save FC Oss from relegation to the newly established Topklasse level at the end of the 2009–10 season.

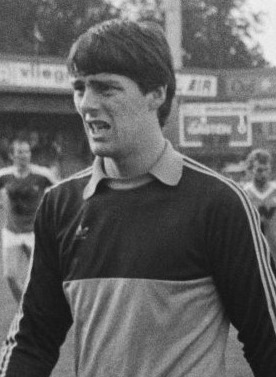
de Koning in 1981

From July 2010, De Koning was in charge of Eerste Divisie club AGOVV Apeldoorn. In March 2011, it was announced that AGOVV and him had parted ways at the end of the season; De Koning was then unveiled later in May as new head coach of Helmond Sport for the 2011–12 season. On 21 April 2012, it was confirmed that he would be in charge of Eerste Divisie club Volendam for the 2012–13 season, signing a two-year deal.

== Honours ==
=== Player ===
AZ

- Eredivisie: 1980–81
- KNVB Cup: 1977–78, 1980–81, 1981–82
