= Kalbe Farma =

Indonesian pharmaceutical, healthcare and nutrition company

PT Kalbe Farma Tbk
- Current logo since 6 March 2007
- Type: Public
- Traded as: IDX: KLBF
- Industry: Pharmaceuticals; Healthcare
- Founded: 10 September 1960; 65 years ago 10 September 1966; 59 years ago
- Headquarters: Jakarta, Indonesia
- Area served: Worldwide
- Key people: Vidjongtius (CEO); Bernadette Ruth Irawati Setiady (President)
- Products: Drugs, energy drinks, milk, baby food, healthy drinks, herbal supplements and nutrition products
- Revenue: ▲ Rp 26.261 trillion (2021)
- Net income: ▲ Rp 3.208 trillion (2021)
- Total assets: ▲ Rp 25.667 trillion (2021)
- Total equity: ▲ Rp 21.365 trillion (2021)
- Number of employees: 16,235 (2021)
- Subsidiaries: Bintang Toedjoe; Kalbe Nutritionals; Kalbe Genexine Biologics; Innogene Kalbiotech; Bifarma Adiluhung; Kalbe International; Innolab Sains Internasional; Pharma Metric Labs; Saka Farma Laboratories; Dankos Farma; Hexpharm Jaya Laboratories; Hale International; Finusolprima Farma Internasional; Kalbe Milko Indonesia; Enseval Putera; Indogravure; Kalbe Morinaga; Kalbe Vision; Kalventis
- Website: www.kalbe.co.id

PT Kalbe Farma Tbk, or simply known as Kalbe, is an Indonesian pharmaceutical, healthcare and nutrition company established in 1966. The company has expanded by strategic acquisitions of pharmaceutical companies, becoming an integrated consumer health and nutrition enterprise. The Kalbe Group has brands in the prescription drugs, OTC drugs, energy drink and nutrition products, with a distribution arm that reaches over one million outlets. Notably, the company produces misoprostol (sold under the brand name of Invitec), a drug which is used to treat stomach ulcers but is also widely used in Indonesia as an illegal abortifacient (abortion-inducing substance).

Company brands in healthcare and pharmaceutical segments include Promag, Mixagrip, Woods, Komix, Diabetasol, Prenagen, Extra Joss and Fitbar.

Kalbe is the largest publicly listed pharmaceutical company in Southeast Asia with around US$5 billion in market capitalization and revenues of over Rp 15 trillion. The name "Kalbe" is a syllabic abbreviation of its founder's name: Khouw Lip Boen.

== History ==
Kalbe Farma was founded on September 10, 1966, by 6 siblings, K.L. Tjoen, Theresia H. Setiady, Khouw Lip Swan, Khouw Lip Boen (Also Known As: Dr. Boenyamin Setiawan), Maria Karmila, and F. Bing Aryanto. Kalbe Farma first began operations in a house garage that was owned by the founders.

In May 2020, Kalbe Farma signed a Memorandum of Understanding with South Korean pharmaceuticals company Genexine Inc. to develop a vaccine for the new corona virus or COVID-19.
