= Joop Gall =

Dutch footballer and manager

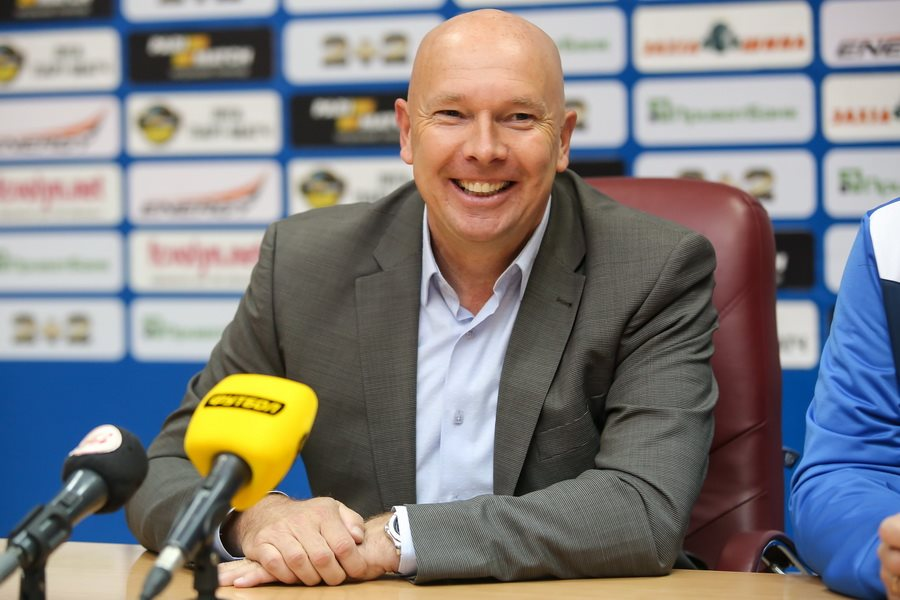

Personal information
- Date of birth: 25 December 1963 (age 62)
- Place of birth: Hoogezand-Sappemeer, Netherlands
- Height: 1.81 m (5 ft 11 1/2 in)
- Position: Defender

Team information
- Current team: PKC '83

Youth career
- De Vogels
- Velocitas

Senior career*
Years	Team	Apps	(Gls)
1983–1984	Groningen	4	(1)
1984–1986	Veendam	65	(11)
1986–1987	Groningen	25	(1)
1987–1990	Veendam	97	(15)
1990–1991	Heerenveen	27	(3)
1991–1997	Groningen	121	(3)
1997–1999	Veendam	42	(4)
Total		381	(36)

Managerial career
- 1999–2000: De Vogels
- 2001–2005: Groningen (assistant)
- 2005–2011: Veendam
- 2011–2012: Go Ahead Eagles
- 2012–2015: Emmen
- 2016: Stal Kamianske (assistant)
- 2016: Stal Kamianske (caretaker)
- 2016–2017: Stal Kamianske
- 2017: Spakenburg (caretaker)
- 2018: Pelikaan-S (caretaker)
- 2019: DFS (caretaker)
- 2021: Guangzhou City (asst.)
- 2021–2022: PSM Makassar
- * Club domestic league appearances and goals

Joop Gall (born 25 December 1963) is a Dutch football manager and former player.

== Playing career ==
Born in Hoogezand-Sappemeer, Groningen, Gall spent his entire career playing with three teams, all from the North of the Netherlands: BV Veendam, FC Groningen and SC Heerenveen. He retired in 1999 after a third spell with BV Veendam.

== Coaching career ==
From 2001 to 2005 Gall served as assistant coach at FC Groningen. In 2005, he was appointed head coach of Eerste Divisie club BV Veendam, a position he left six years later in 2011 to take over at Go Ahead Eagles. Gall was sacked by Go Ahead Eagles in March 2012, with the club in 11th place. Since July 2012 Gall is the FC Emmen manager.

In April 2018, he was announced as caretaker manager of VV Pelikaan-S until the end of the season. One year later, he was once again appointed as caretaker manager, this time for SV DFS. In November 2019, Gall moved to China to work for a football academy in Zhengzhou, but left the country during the COVID-19 outbreak. He returned to China to become assistant to manager Jean-Paul van Gastel at Guangzhou City in January 2021, only to leave them for Indonesian side PSM Makassar later that year.

In summer 2026, Gall took charge of amateur side PKC '83, leaving SC Stadskanaal because he could not combine coaching them with his work for the Achtkarspelen municipality.
