= 2026–27 Persis Solo season =

Persis Solo
2026–27 season
- Owner: PT Persis Solo Saestu
- President: Kaesang Pangarep
- Head coach: (Indonesia) Ricky Nelson
- Stadium: Manahan Stadium
- Championship: 2026–27 Championship
Home colours	Away colours
- All statistics correct as of 21 July 2026.

The 2026–27 season will be Persis Solo's 103rd season in existence and its 1st season in Championship, following its relegation from the 2025–26 Super League. This will be Persis Solo's first season under new head coach Ricky Nelson who replaced the previous coach, Milomir Šešlija.

== Squad ==
As of 21 July 2026

No.	Player	Nationality	Date of birth (age)	Previous club	Notes
Goalkeepers
20	Teguh Amiruddin	(Indonesia)	13 August 1993 (age 33)	(Indonesia) Semen Padang	
26	Muhammad Faza	(Indonesia)	6 August 2005 (age 21)	(Indonesia) Persis U-20	
91	Rizky Maulana Putra	(Indonesia)	9 September 1996 (age 30)	(Indonesia) Sumsel United F.C.	
31	Pualam Bahari	(Indonesia)	11 May 2002 (age 24)	(Indonesia) Kendal Tornado F.C.	
Defenders
2	Novan Sasongko	(Indonesia)	26 November 1989 (age 36)	(Indonesia) Madura United	
5	Slavko Damjanović	(Montenegro)	2 November 1992 (age 34)	(Indonesia) Bhayangkara Presisi	
13	Dodi Alekvan Djin	(Indonesia)	31 December 1998 (age 27)	(Indonesia) Persela Lamongan	
14	Oliver Leeming	(Indonesia)	27 February 2006 (age 20)	(Indonesia) Persija Jakarta	On loan from Persija Jakarta
15	Hasyim Kipuw	(Indonesia)	9 May 1988 (age 38)	(Indonesia) Adhyaksa F.C.	
16	Daffa Habibullah	(Indonesia)	16 September 2005 (age 21)	(Indonesia) Persis U-20	
30	Eky Taufik	(Indonesia)	15 February 1991 (age 35)	(Indonesia) Persela Lamongan	
32	Kadek Raditya	(Indonesia)	13 June 1999 (age 27)	(Indonesia) Persebaya Surabaya	On loan from Persebaya Surabaya
44	Riswan Lauhin	(Indonesia)	8 August 1998 (age 28)	(Indonesia) Persebaya Surabaya	
95	Rafa Abdurahman	(Indonesia)	20 August 2007 (age 19)	(Indonesia) Persija U-20	
Midfielders
3	Andrean Rindorindo	(Indonesia)	2 May 2004 (age 22)	(Indonesia) Persita Tangerang	
4	Asep Berlian	(Indonesia)	19 July 1990 (age 36)	(Indonesia) Garudayaksa F.C.	
6	Wbeymar Angulo	(Armenia)	6 March 1992 (age 34)	(Indonesia) Malut United	
8	Fandi Ahmad Muzaki	(Indonesia)	1 January 2008 (age 18)	(Indonesia) Persija Jakarta	On loan from Persija Jakarta
10	Vico Duarte	(Brazil)	3 December 1996 (age 29)	(Indonesia) Java United F.C.	
25	Rizky Nasution	(Indonesia)	16 July 1997 (age 29)	(Indonesia) Bekasi City	
41	Samuel Balinsa	(Indonesia)	8 March 1999 (age 27)	(Indonesia) Arema F.C.	
78	Alkelvin Bhaghi	(Indonesia)	31 August 2006 (age 20)	(Indonesia) Persija Jakarta	On loan from Persija Jakarta
99	Oktafianus Fernando	(Indonesia)	4 October 1993 (age 33)	(Indonesia) Persebaya Surabaya	
Forwards
7	Feby Eka Putra	(Indonesia)	12 February 1999 (age 27)	(Indonesia) Garudayaksa F.C.	
9	Saddam Gaffar	(Indonesia)	24 September 2001 (age 25)	(Indonesia) F.C. Bekasi City	
11	Bernard Doumbia	(Ivory Coast)	11 November 1992 (age 34)	(Indonesia) Bhayangkara Presisi	
18	Saldi Amiruddin	(Indonesia)	9 March 1995 (age 31)	(Indonesia) F.C. Bekasi City	
19	Ahmad Mujadid	(Indonesia)	18 October 2007 (age 19)	(Indonesia) Persija Jakarta	On loan from Persija Jakarta
21	Theodore Leeming	(Indonesia)	20 December 2007 (age 18)	(Indonesia) Persija Jakarta	On loan from Persija Jakarta
28	Terens Puhiri	(Indonesia)	13 October 1996 (age 30)	(Indonesia) PSS Sleman	
22	Andy Harjito	(Indonesia)	27 September 2001 (age 25)	(Indonesia) PSPS Pekanbaru	
29	Yohanes Baghi	(Indonesia)	4 December 2004 (age 21)	(Indonesia) Persebata Lembata	
88	Irsyad Maulana	(Indonesia)	27 September 1993 (age 33)	(Indonesia) Semen Padang	
24	Faizul Mukhlisin	(Indonesia)	8 October 2007 (age 19)	(Indonesia) Persis U-20	

== Coaching staff ==
Position	Name
Head coach	(Indonesia) Ricky Nelson
Assistant coach	(Indonesia) Nurcholis Majid
Assistant coach	(Indonesia) Febi Aji
Assistant coach	(Indonesia) Dedy Gusmawan
Assistant coach	(Indonesia) Arif Rachman
Goalkeeper coach	(Indonesia) Hendro Kartiko
Fitness coach	(Indonesia) Randy Adam
Analyst	(Indonesia) Rochmat Setiawan
Team Doctor	(Indonesia) dr. Iwan Utomo
Physiotherapist	(Indonesia) M. Ramdhani
Masseur	(Indonesia) Adam Tri Nugroho
Masseur	(Indonesia) Kusman

== Transfers ==
=== In ===
Date	Position	No	Player	From	Fee	Ref.
Pre-season
2 July 2026	DF	2	(Indonesia) Novan Sasongko	(Indonesia) Madura United		
8 July 2026	GK	20	(Indonesia) Teguh Amiruddin	(Indonesia) Semen Padang		
9 July 2026	MF	23	(Indonesia) Badrian Ilham	(Indonesia) Persita Tangerang		
10 July 2026	MF	3	(Indonesia) Andrean Rindorindo	(Indonesia) Persita Tangerang		
10 July 2026	MF	71	(Indonesia) Luthfi Kamal	(Indonesia) Persikad Depok		
11 July 2026	FW	18	(Indonesia) Saldi Amiruddin	(Indonesia) Bekasi City		
11 July 2026	MF	4	(Indonesia) Asep Berlian	(Indonesia) Garudayaksa F.C.		
11 July 2026	DF	15	(Indonesia) Hasyim Kipuw	(Indonesia) Adhyaksa F.C.		
12 July 2026	GK	97	(Indonesia) Mario Londok	(Indonesia) PSIS Semarang		
12 July 2026	MF	25	(Indonesia) Rizky Nasution	(Indonesia) Bekasi City		
16 July 2026	MF	10	(Spain) Juan Mera	(Indonesia) Persiraja Banda Aceh		
17 July 2026	FW	7	(Indonesia) Feby Eka Putra	(Indonesia) Dewa United		
20 July 2026	FW	28	(Indonesia) Terens Puhiri	(Indonesia) PSS Sleman		
1 August 2026	DF	5	(Montenegro) Slavko Damjanović	(Indonesia) Bhayangkara Presisi		
2 August 2026	FW	11	(Ivory Coast) Bernard Henry Doumbia	(Indonesia) Bhayangkara Presisi		
12 August 2026	FW	9	(Indonesia) Saddam Gaffar	(Indonesia) Bekasi City		
12 August 2026	GK		(Indonesia) Rizky Maulana	(Indonesia) Sumsel United F.C.		
21 August 2026	MF		(Indonesia) Samuel Balinsa	(Indonesia) Arema F.C.		
23 August 2026	DF		(Indonesia) Riswan Lauhin	(Indonesia) Malut United		
23 August 2026	MF		(Indonesia) Oktafianus Fernando	(Indonesia) Persebaya Surabaya		
26 August 2026	GK		(Indonesia) Pualam Bahari	(Indonesia) Kendal Tornado F.C.		
26 August 2026	FW		(Indonesia) Andy Harjito	(Indonesia) PSPS Pekanbaru		
26 August 2026	FW		(Indonesia) Yohanes Baghi	(Indonesia) Persebata Lembata		
28 August 2026	MF		(Armenia) Wbeymar Angulo	(Indonesia) Java United F.C.		
28 August 2026	FW		(Indonesia) Irsyad Maulana	(Indonesia) Semen Padang		
22 September 2026	MF		(Brazil) Vico Duarte	(Indonesia) Java United F.C.		
Mid-season

=== Out ===
Date	Position	No	Player	To	Fee	Ref.
Pre-season
24 June 2026	MF	22	(Indonesia) Sutanto Tan	(Indonesia) Persita Tangerang		
26 June 2026	MF	26	(Indonesia) Rian Miziar	-		
4 July 2026	FW	18	(Indonesia) Febri Hariyadi	(Indonesia) Persib bandung	End of loan	
4 July 2026	DF	40	(Indonesia) Ikhwan Tanamal	(Indonesia) Persib bandung	End of loan	
4 July 2026	FW	11	(Indonesia) Yabes Roni	(Indonesia) Bali United	End of loan	
4 July 2026	DF	56	(Indonesia) Alfriyanto Nico	(Indonesia) Persija Jakarta	End of loan	
4 July 2026	FW	97	(Indonesia) Septian Bagaskara	(Indonesia) Dewa United	End of loan	
4 July 2026	DF		(Indonesia) Faqih Maulana	(Indonesia) Adhyaksa F.C. Bekasi		
4 July 2026	FW	9	(Brazil) Bruno Gomes	(Malta) Valletta F.C.	End of Contract	
4 July 2026	MF	5	(Brazil) Andrei Alba	-	End of Contract	
4 July 2026	DF	6	(Croatia) Luka Dumančić	(Azerbaijan) Araz-Naxçıvan PFK	End of Contract	
4 July 2026	GK	54	(Serbia) Vukašin Vraneš	-	End of Contract	
4 July 2026	DF	6	(Serbia) Dušan Mijić	(Romania) CSM Reșița	End of Contract	
4 July 2026	FW	4	(Liberia) Abu Kamara	-	End of Contract	
4 July 2026	FW	77	(Brazil) Jefferson Carioca	(Bolivia) Independiente Petrolero	End of Contract	
4 July 2026	FW	99	(Ukraine) Roman Paparyha	(Uzbekistan) Qizilqum FC	End of Contract	
4 July 2026	MF	88	(Serbia) Miroslav Maričić	(Serbia) FK Javor Ivanjica	End of Contract	
4 July 2026	MF	10	(Brazil) Dimitri Lima Souza	-	End of Contract	
9 July 2026	FW		(Indonesia) Althaf Indie	(Indonesia) Persik Kediri		
10 July 2026	MF		(Indonesia) Zanadin Fariz	(Indonesia) Persik Kediri		
30 September 2026	MF	10	(Spain) Juan Mera	-	Mutual Termination	
30 September 2026	MF	23	(Indonesia) Badrian ilham	-	Mutual Termination	
30 September 2026	MF	71	(Indonesia) Luthfi Kamal	-	Mutual Termination	
30 September 2026	GK	97	(Indonesia) Mario Londok	-	Mutual Termination	
30 September 2026	DF	27	(Indonesia) Rizky Syahputra	-	Mutual Termination	
Mid-season

=== Loans in ===
Date	Position	No	Player	From	Until	Ref.
Pre-season
22 June 2026	FW		(Indonesia) Ahmad Mujadid	(Indonesia) Persija Jakarta	End of season	
7 July 2026	MF		(Indonesia) Fandi Ahmad Muzaki	(Indonesia) Persija Jakarta	End of season	
9 July 2026	FW		(Indonesia) Theodore Leeming	(Indonesia) Persija Jakarta	End of season	
9 July 2026	DF		(Indonesia) Oliver Leeming	(Indonesia) Persija Jakarta	End of season	
10 July 2026	MF		(Indonesia) Alkelvin Bhaghi	(Indonesia) Persija Jakarta	End of season	
Mid-season

=== Loans out ===
Date	Position	No	Player	From	Until	Ref.
Pre-season
14 August 2026	FW		(Serbia) Dejan Tumbas	(Malaysia) Penang F.C.	End of season	
Mid-season

== Pre-season ==
Win Draw Loss

=== Friendly matches ===
2 August 2026 Friendly Match	Dewa United	1–3	Persis Solo	Tangerang
15:30 UTC+7				Stadium: Dewa United Arena; Attendance: 0

5 August 2026 Friendly Match	Persis Solo	0–2	PSPS Pekanbaru	Bekasi
15:30 UTC+7				Stadium: Garudayaksa Training Center; Attendance: 0

18 August 2026 Friendly Match	Persis Solo	0–1	Java United F.C.	Boyolali
15:30 UTC+7				Stadium: Stadion Kebogiro; Attendance: 0

23 August 2026 Friendly Match	Persis Solo	3–0	Persekabpas Pasuruan	Boyolali
15:30 UTC+7				Stadium: Stadion Kebogiro; Attendance: 0

27 August 2026 Friendly Match	Persis Solo	0–1	PSMS Medan	Boyolali
15:30 UTC+7				Stadium: Stadion Kebogiro; Attendance: 0

4 September 2026 Friendly Match	Persis Solo	0–0	Persiku Kudus	Boyolali
15:30 UTC+7				Stadium: Stadion Kebogiro; Attendance: 0

== Competitions ==
=== Overview ===
Competition	First match	Last match	Starting round	Final position	Record							
Competition	First match	Last match	Starting round	Final position	Pld	W	D	L	GF	GA	GD	Win %
2026–27 Championship (Indonesia)	13 September 2026	-	Matchday 1	8th	9	1	4	4	15	14	+1	11.11
Indonesia League Cup	3 November 2026	-	Group stage	TBD	1	0	0	1	0	2	−2	0.00
Total					10	1	4	5	15	16	−1	10.00

Source: Competitions

=== East Group ===
Pos	Team	Pld	W	D	L	GF	GA	GD	Pts	Promotion, qualification or relegation
1	Kendal Tornado (Note: Kendal Tornado had 1 point deduction due to licensing issues.)	9	5	4	0	20	5	+15	18	Promotion to the 2027–28 Super League and qualification for the final
2	Barito Putera	9	5	2	2	17	10	+7	17	Qualification for the promotion play-off
3	RANS Nusantara	9	4	4	1	19	12	+7	16 (Note: Ranked on head-to-head points: RANS Nusantara 3, Persela 0.)	
4	Persela (Note: Persela had 1 point deduction due to licensing issues.)	9	5	2	2	17	9	+8	16	
5	Deltras	9	4	3	2	19	13	+6	15	
6	Persipura (Note: Persipura had 1 point deduction due to licensing issues.)	9	4	2	3	21	14	+7	13	
7	de Red	9	3	3	3	13	11	+2	12	
8	Persis	9	1	4	4	15	14	+1	7	
9	Persiba (Note: Persiba had 4 points deduction due to licensing issues.)	9	2	0	7	8	19	−11	2	Qualification for the relegation play-off
10	PSBS (Note: PSBS had 4 points deduction due to licensing issues.)	9	0	0	9	3	45	−42	−4	Relegation to the 2027–28 Liga Nusantara

Updated to match(es) played on 8 November 2026. Source: Championship 2026–27
Rules for classification: 1) Points; 2) Head-to-head points; 3) Head-to-head goal difference; 4) Head-to-head goals scored; 5) Goal difference; 6) Goals scored; 7) Fair-play points; 8) Draw.

=== Results summary ===
Overall								Home						Away					
Pld	W	D	L	GF	GA	GD	Pts	W	D	L	GF	GA	GD	W	D	L	GF	GA	GD
9	1	4	4	15	14	+1	7	1	2	2	10	6	+4	0	2	2	5	8	−3

==== Results by matchday ====
Matchday	1	2	3	4	5	6	7	8	9	10	11	12	13	14	15	16	17	18	19	20	21
Ground	A	H	A	H	H	A	H	A	H												
Result	L	W	D	L	D	D	D	L	L												
Position	7	4	5	5	6	7	7	8	8												

Updated to match(es) played on 22 November 2025. Source: Matches
A = Away; H = Home; W = Win; D = Draw; L = Loss; P = Postponed

=== Matches ===
Win Draw Loss Rescheduled

==== First round ====
13 September 2026 1	Persela Lamongan	2-0	Persis Solo	Lamongan
15:30 UTC+7	Hambali 33' (yellow card) 52'; Risqki 44'	(LIB) (ILMS)	Novan (yellow card) 17'; Alkelvin (yellow card) 38'	Stadium: Surajaya; Attendance: 10,615; Referee: Choirudin

20 September 2026 2	Persis Solo	7-0	PSBS Biak	Surakarta
19:00 UTC+7	Doumbia 11' 38' 57' 90+2'; Theo 12'; Balinsa (yellow card) 13'; Olie (yellow card) 44' (goal) 62' 72'	(LIB) (ILMS)		Stadium: Manahan Stadium; Attendance: 7,062; Referee: Yongky Pratama

26 September 2026 3	Persipura Jayapura	1-1	Persis Solo	Sidoarjo
19:00 UTC+7	Lima (yellow card) 34'; Alexsandro 61'	(LIB) (ILMS)	Kadek 36'; Angulo (yellow card) 48'; Rizky (yellow card) 82'; Harjito (yellow card) 90+5'	Stadium: Gelora Delta Stadium; Attendance: 0 Referee: Totok Fitrianto

3 October 2026 4	Persis Solo	0-2	Kendal Tornado	Surakarta
19:00 UTC+7	Rafa (yellow card) 14'; Terens (yellow card) 45'	(LIB) (ILMS)	Ibnu (yellow card) 40' (yellow-red card) 71'; Cruz 63'; Aprianto (yellow card) 69'; Maiket (yellow card) 83' (goal) 90+3'	Stadium: Manahan Stadium; Attendance: 5,598; Referee: Fadli Nurdiana

11 October 2026 5	Persis Solo	0-0	de Red	Surakarta
19:00 UTC+7	Theo (yellow card) 23'; Oktafianus (yellow card) 54'; Andrean (yellow card) 81'	(LIB) (ILMS)	Adam (yellow card) 19'; Ahmad (yellow card) 51'; Wisal (yellow card) 57'	Stadium: Manahan Stadium; Attendance: 1,215; Referee: Marjukih

18 October 2026 6	Deltras F.C.	3-3	Persis Solo	Sidoarjo
15:30 UTC+7	Shulton (red card) 22'; Irman 29'; Gading (yellow card) 38'; Mohcine 52' (yellow card) 84'; Nathan 69'; Bagus (yellow card) 81'; Marckho (yellow card) 90+6'	(LIB) (ILMS)	Doumbia 17' 74' 90+4' (yellow card) 90+4'; Theo (yellow card) 63'; Andrean (yellow card) 67'; Vico (yellow card) 84'	Stadium: Gelora Delta Stadium; Attendance: 11,206; Referee: Heru Cahyono

24 October 2026 7	Persis Solo	2-2	RANS Nusantara	Surakarta
19:00 UTC+7	Vico 45+6' (pen.); Feby (yellow card) 45+8'; Eky (yellow card) 53'; Theo (yellow card) 56'; Doumbia (yellow card) 64'; Andy 82' (yellow card) 88'; Andrean (yellow card) 90+2'	(LIB) (ILMS)	Refan 11'; Bayu (yellow card) 26'; Andersen 68'	Stadium: Manahan Stadium; Attendance: 1,877; Referee: Louis Ridho Muhammad

30 October 2026 8	Barito Putera	2-1	Persis Solo	Banjarmasin
15:30 UTC+7	Renan 6'; Murilo 15'; Bayu (yellow card) 47'; Aditiya (yellow card) 58'; Syamsul (yellow card) 74'	(LIB) (ILMS)	Rafa (yellow card) 62'; Saldi 79'	Stadium: 17th May Stadium; Attendance: 4,091; Referee: Gedion Dapaherang

7 November 2026 9	Persis Solo	1-2	Persiba Balikpapan	Surakarta
19:00 UTC+7	Fandi (yellow card) 54'; Hasyim (red card) 58'; Feby (red card) 70'; Doumbia 74'	(LIB) (ILMS)	Ardi 34'; Andi (yellow card) 49'; Jay (yellow card) 59'; Evan 66'; Cerilus (yellow card) 88'	Stadium: Manahan Stadium; Attendance: 8,294; Referee: Hamim Thohari

=== Indonesia League Cup ===
==== Group H ====
Pos	Team	Pld	W	D	L	GF	GA	GD	Pts	Qualification
1	Persik (1)	1	1	0	0	2	0	+2	3	Advance to round of 12
2	Deltras (2)	0	0	0	0	0	0	0	0	
3	Persis (2)	1	0	0	1	0	2	−2	0	

Updated to match(es) played on 4 November 2026. Source: 2026–27 I.League Cup
Rules for classification: 1) Points; 2) Head-to-head points; 3) Head-to-head goal difference; 4) Head-to-head goals scored; 5) Goal difference; 6) Goals scored; 7) Fair-play points; 8) Draw.

4 November 2026	Persik (1)	2–0	Persis (2)	Kediri
19:00	Toral 4'; Enrique 8'	Summary; Report	Balinsa (yellow card) 46'	Stadium: Brawijaya Stadium; Attendance: 3,845; Referee: Nendi Rohaendy

2 December 2026	Persis (2)	v	Deltras (2)	Surakarta
19:00		Report		Stadium: Manahan Stadium

== Statistics ==
=== Squad appearances and goals ===
Last updated on 20 September 2026

Players with no appearances are not included on the list.

No.	Pos	Nat	Player	Total		Super League		Piala Indonesia	
No.	Pos	Nat	Player	Apps	Goals	Apps	Goals	Apps	Goals
Goalkeepers
20	GK	(Indonesia) IDN	Teguh Amiruddin	4	0	4	0	0	0
31	GK	(Indonesia) IDN	Pualam Bahari	5	0	5	0	0	0
Defenders
2	DF	(Indonesia) IDN	Novan Sasongko	4	0	4	0	0	0
3	DF	(Indonesia) IDN	Andrean Rindorindo	5	0	3+2	0	0	0
5	DF	(Montenegro) MNE	Slavko Damjanović	1	0	1	0	0	0
13	DF	(Indonesia) IDN	Dodi Alekvan Djin	8	0	4+4	0	0	0
14	DF	(Indonesia) IDN	Oliver Leeming	4	2	4	2	0	0
15	DF	(Indonesia) IDN	Hasyim Kipuw	6	0	6	0	0	0
16	DF	(Indonesia) IDN	Daffa Habibullah	3	0	2+1	0	0	0
30	DF	(Indonesia) IDN	Eky Taufik	4	0	4	0	0	0
32	DF	(Indonesia) IDN	Kadek Raditya	8	1	8	1	0	0
95	DF	(Indonesia) IDN	Rafa Abdurahman	5	0	1+4	0	0	0
Midfielders
4	MF	(Indonesia) IDN	Asep Berlian	2	0	1+1	0	0	0
6	MF	(Colombia) COL	Wbeymar Angulo	9	0	9	0	0	0
8	MF	(Indonesia) IDN	Fandi Ahmad Muzaki	6	0	6	0	0	0
10	MF	(Brazil) BRA	Vinicius Duarte	6	1	6	1	0	0
25	MF	(Indonesia) IDN	Rizky Yusuf Nasution	2	0	0+2	0	0	0
41	MF	(Indonesia) IDN	Samuel Balinsa	9	0	3+6	0	0	0
78	MF	(Indonesia) IDN	Alkelvin Bhaghi	2	0	1+1	0	0	0
99	MF	(Indonesia) IDN	Oktafianus Fernando	1	0	0+1	0	0	0
Forwards
7	FW	(Indonesia) IDN	Feby Eka Putra	8	0	5+3	0	0	0
11	FW	(Ivory Coast) CIV	Bernard Doumbia	9	8	9	8	0	0
18	FW	(Indonesia) IDN	Saldi Amiruddin	5	1	4+1	1	0	0
19	FW	(Indonesia) IDN	Ahmad Mujadid	2	0	1+1	0	0	0
21	FW	(Indonesia) IDN	Theodore Leeming	7	1	6+1	1	0	0
22	FW	(Indonesia) IDN	Andy Harjito	7	1	0+7	1	0	0
28	FW	(Indonesia) IDN	Terens Puhiri	8	0	2+6	0	0	0
29	FW	(Indonesia) IDN	Yohanes Baghi	2	0	0+2	0	0	0
88	FW	(Indonesia) IDN	Irsyad Maulana	1	0	0+1	0	0	0

Last updated: 08 November 2026.
Source: Soccerway
