= 2023–24 Arema F.C. season =

Arema F.C.
2023–24 season
- CEO: Iwan Budianto
- Head coach: Joko Susilo (until 10 August 2023); Kuncoro (caretaker, from 10 to 23 August 2023); Fernando Valente (from 23 August 2023 to 9 February 2024); Widodo Cahyono Putro (from 9 February 2024)
- Stadium: Kapten I Wayan Dipta Stadium
- Liga 1: 15th
- Top goalscorer: Gustavo (14)
- Highest home attendance: 349 (vs. PSS, 30 September 2023)
- Lowest home attendance: 34 (vs. Dewa United, 2 November 2023)
- Average home league attendance: 131
Home colours	Away colours

The 2023–24 Arema F.C. season is Arema's 34th competitive season. The club will compete in Liga 1. Arema Football Club a professional football club based in Malang, East Java, Indonesia.

== Squad information ==
=== First team squad ===
Note: Flags indicate national team as defined under FIFA eligibility rules; some limited exceptions apply. Players may hold more than one non-FIFA nationality.

No.	Pos.	Nation	Player
3	DF	IDN	Bayu Aji
4	DF	IDN	Syaeful Anwar
5	DF	IDN	Bagas Adi
6	MF	COL	Julián Guevara
7	MF	ARG	Ariel Lucero
8	MF	IDN	Arkhan Fikri
10	FW	IDN	Muhammad Rafli
11	FW	AUS	Charles Lokolingoy
12	DF	IDN	Rifad Marasabessy
14	MF	IDN	Jayus Hariono
17	FW	IDN	Ginanjar Wahyu (on loan from Persija Jakarta)
18	GK	PHI	Julian Schwarzer

No.	Pos.	Nation	Player
19	DF	IDN	Achmad Maulana (on loan from Persija Jakarta)
20	MF	IDN	Samuel Balinsa
21	FW	IDN	Flabio Soares
22	GK	IDN	Dicki Agung
23	GK	IDN	Teguh Amiruddin
26	DF	IDN	Achmad Figo
27	FW	IDN	Dedik Setiawan
32	MF	BRA	Charles Almeida
41	FW	IDN	Dendi Santoso (vice-captain)
86	FW	IDN	Greg Nwokolo
87	DF	IDN	Johan Alfarizi (captain)

== Transfers ==
=== In ===
No.	Pos	Player	Transferred From	Fee	Date	Source
12	DF	(Indonesia) Rifad Marasabessy	(Indonesia) Borneo Samarinda	Free	12 May 2023	
20	MF	(Indonesia) Samuel Balinsa	(Indonesia) Persewar	Free	12 May 2023	
21	FW	(Indonesia) Flabio Soares	(Indonesia) Putra Delta Sidoarjo	Free	12 May 2023	
24	MF	(Indonesia) Rendra Teddy	(Indonesia) Putra Delta Sidoarjo	Free	12 May 2023	
79	DF	(Indonesia) Hamdi Sula	(Indonesia) PSMS	Free	12 May 2023	
—	DF	(Indonesia) Fardan Harahap	(Indonesia) PSMS	Free	12 May 2023	
66	FW	(Indonesia) Gufroni Al Maruf	(Indonesia) Dewa United	Free	19 May 2023	
22	GK	(Indonesia) Dicki Agung	(Indonesia) Deltras	Free	23 May 2023	
97	FW	(Indonesia) Samsudin	(Indonesia) Deltras	Free	23 May 2023	
70	FW	(Brazil) Gustavo	(Kuwait) Al-Nasr	Free	24 May 2023	
11	FW	(Australia) Charles Lokolingoy	(Malta) Żebbuġ Rangers	Free	30 May 2023	
15	DF	(Mali) Ichaka Diarra	(Lebanon) Ansar	Free	30 May 2023	
29	GK	(Indonesia) Adixi Lenzivio	(Indonesia) PSMS	Free	13 June 2023	
25	DF	(Indonesia) Asyraq Gufron	(Indonesia) Bhayangkara	Free	26 June 2023	
7	MF	(Argentina) Ariel Lucero	(Argentina) All Boys	Free	26 June 2023	
58	DF	(Indonesia) Mikael Tata	(Indonesia) Waanal Brothers	Free	26 June 2023	
32	MF	(Brazil) Charles Almeida	(Brazil) Manaus	Free	27 June 2023	
18	GK	(Philippines) Julian Schwarzer	(Malaysia) Kuching City	Undisclosed	20 July 2023	
86	FW	(Indonesia) Greg Nwokolo	Free agent	Free	21 July 2023	
6	MF	(Colombia) Julián Guevara	(Colombia) Jaguares de Córdoba	Free	16 November 2023	
91	FW	(Bolivia) Gilbert Álvarez	(Bolivia) Palmaflor del Trópico	Undisclosed	25 November 2023	

=== Out ===
No.	Pos	Player	Transferred To	Fee	Date	Source
4	DF	(Portugal) Sérgio Silva	(Portugal) Gondomar	Free	4 May 2023	
24	DF	(Indonesia) Andik Rendika Rama	(Indonesia) Madura United	Free	8 May 2023	
29	FW	(Guinea-Bissau) Abel Camará	(Portugal) Sintrense	Free	17 May 2023	
90	GK	(Brazil) Adilson Maringá	(Indonesia) Bali United	Free	18 May 2023	
11	MF	(Indonesia) Gian Zola	(Indonesia) PSIS	Free	21 May 2023	
33	GK	(Indonesia) Andriyas Francisco	(Indonesia) Persijap	Free	4 June 2023	
30	FW	(Indonesia) Ilham Armaiyn	(Indonesia) Malut United	Free	22 June 2023	
—	DF	(Indonesia) Fardan Harahap	(Indonesia) PSMS	Free	26 June 2023	
99	FW	(Indonesia) Kushedya Hari Yudo	(Indonesia) RANS Nusantara	Free	29 June 2023	
2	DF	(Indonesia) Joko Susilo	(Indonesia) PSMS	Free	30 June 2023	
28	MF	(Indonesia) Seiya Da Costa Lay	Free agent	Free	11 July 2023	
78	FW	(Indonesia) Bramntio Ramadhan	(Indonesia) PSCS	Free	21 July 2023	
—	MF	(Japan) Renshi Yamaguchi	(Indonesia) Gresik United	Free	17 August 2023	
16	MF	(Indonesia) Muhammad Faiz	(Indonesia) Persijap	Free	1 September 2023	
58	DF	(Indonesia) Mikael Tata	(Indonesia) Persebaya	Free	8 November 2023	
15	DF	(Mali) Ichaka Diarra	(Lebanon) Al Ansar	Free	16 December 2023	
91	FW	(Bolivia) Gilbert Álvarez	(Bolivia) Oriente Petrolero	Free	7 March 2024	

=== Loan In ===
No.	Pos	Player	Loaned From	Start	End	Source
17	FW	(Indonesia) Ginanjar Wahyu	(Indonesia) Persija	11 June 2023	30 June 2024	
19	DF	(Indonesia) Achmad Maulana	(Indonesia) Persija	11 June 2023	30 June 2024	

=== Loan Out ===
No.	Pos	Player	Loaned To	Start	End	Source
—	DF	(Indonesia) Rizky Dwi Febrianto	(Indonesia) Borneo Samarinda	11 May 2023	30 June 2024	
13	FW	(Indonesia) Hamzah Titofani	(Indonesia) Sada Sumut	11 July 2023	30 June 2024	
18	MF	(Indonesia) Kevin Armedyah	(Indonesia) Sada Sumut	11 July 2023	30 June 2024	
24	MF	(Indonesia) Rendra Teddy	(Indonesia) Deltras	11 July 2023	30 June 2024	
37	DF	(Indonesia) Ikhfanul Alam	(Indonesia) Persikab	13 July 2023	30 June 2024	
66	FW	(Indonesia) Gufroni Al Maruf	(Indonesia) Persikab	13 July 2023	30 June 2024	
—	MF	(Indonesia) Ahmad Bustomi	(Indonesia) Persikab	13 July 2023	30 June 2024	
—	MF	(Indonesia) Iman Budi Hernandi	(Indonesia) Persikab	13 July 2023	30 June 2024	
29	GK	(Indonesia) Adixi Lenzivio	(Indonesia) PSMS	1 August 2023	30 June 2024	
79	DF	(Indonesia) Hamdi Sula	(Indonesia) PSMS	1 November 2023	30 June 2024	
97	FW	(Indonesia) Samsudin	(Indonesia) Persikab	1 November 2023	30 June 2024	
25	DF	(Indonesia) Asyraq Gufron	(Indonesia) Persikab	1 November 2023	30 June 2024	
70	FW	(Brazil) Gustavo	(Indonesia) Persija	9 November 2023	30 June 2024	
9	MF	(Indonesia) Evan Dimas	(Indonesia) PSIS	14 November 2023	30 June 2024	

== Pre-seasons and friendlies ==
=== Friendlies ===
Date	Opponents	H / A	Result F–A	Scorers	Attendance
9 June 2023	Persikabo 1973	A	3–1	Dedik (3)	0
18 June 2023	Bali United	A	0–0 (5–4p)		0
25 June 2023	RANS Nusantara	N	1–2	Gufron	

== Match results ==
=== Reguler Series ===
==== Matches ====
Date	Opponents	H / A	Result F–A	Scorers	Attendance	League position
2 July 2023	Dewa United	A	0–1		957	15th
7 July 2023	Persib	H	3–3	Gustavo (3) 6', 17' (pen.), 88' (pen.)	305	13th
15 July 2023	Persik	A	2–5	Gustavo (2) 45+1', 66'	5,872	17th
21 July 2023	Bali United	H	1–3	Gustavo 14'	288	17th
30 July 2023	Persis	A	1–1	Gustavo 19' (pen.)	0	17th
5 August 2023	Barito Putera	H	0–4		87	18th
9 August 2023	PSIS	A	0–2		4,138	18th
14 August 2023	RANS Nusantara	H	0–1		131	18th
20 August 2023	Persija	A	2–2	Gustavo (2) 38', 88'	21,211	18th
28 August 2023	Persikabo 1973	H	1–0	Dedik 30'	84	17th
1 September 2023	Bhayangkara	A	2–0	Ginanjar 13', Lokolingoy 90+2'	154	16th
16 September 2023	Persita	H	0–0		59	16th
23 September 2023	Persebaya	A	1–3	Dedik 65'	27,000	16th
30 September 2023	PSS	H	2–1	Gustavo (2) 45+1' (pen.), 85' (pen.)	349	16th
6 October 2023	Borneo Samarinda	H	0–1		119	16th
20 October 2023	PSM	A	0–3		4,429	16th
28 October 2023	Madura United	H	1–1	Gustavo 78' (pen.)	60	16th
2 November 2023	Dewa United	H	2–1	Gustavo 57' (pen.), Dedik 67'	34	16th
8 November 2023	Persib	A	2–2	Dedik 16', Gustavo 55'	24,106	16th
27 November 2023	Persik	H	0–1		108	16th
4 December 2023	Bali United	A	2–3	Guevara 43', Dedik 61'	2,526	16th
9 December 2023	Persis	H	3–1	Dedik 10' (pen.), Álvarez 14' (pen.), Charles 90+3'	110	16th
17 December 2023	Barito Putera	A	0–1		4,950	16th
5 February 2024	PSIS	H	1–4	Lokolingoy 56'	76	16th
22 February 2024	RANS Nusantara	A	3–2	Lokolingoy (2) 17', 22', Álvarez 86'	0	16th
26 February 2024	Persija	H	3–2	Dedik (2) 20', 36' (pen.), Lokolingoy 78'	154	16th
1 March 2024	Persikabo 1973	A	1–0	Lokolingoy 48'	0	15th
6 March 2024	Bhayangkara	H	0–0		83	14th
13 March 2024	Persita	A	3–4	Alfarizi 5', Lokolingoy 24', Dedik 56' (pen.)	1,746	15th
27 March 2024	Persebaya	H	0–1		0	16th
15 April 2024	PSS	A	1–4	Charles 30'	11,654	16th
21 April 2024	Borneo Samarinda	A	2–1	Guevara 43', Lokolingoy 53'	4,717	15th
25 April 2024	PSM	H	3–2	Lokolingoy (2) 30' (pen.), 73' (pen.), Guevara 45+1'	177	13th
30 April 2024	Madura United	A	0–0		0	15th

==== League table ====
Pos	Team	Pld	W	D	L	GF	GA	GD	Pts	Qualification or relegation
13	PSS	34	9	12	13	49	53	−4	39 (Note: Ranked on head-to-head points: PSS 4, Persita 1.)	
14	Persita	34	10	9	15	44	63	−19	39	
15	Arema	34	10	8	16	42	60	−18	38	
16	RANS Nusantara (R)	34	8	11	15	36	52	−16	35	Relegation to 2024–25 Liga 2
17	Bhayangkara (R)	34	5	11	18	42	56	−14	26	Relegation to 2024–25 Liga 2

Source: BRI Liga 1 2023–24
Rules for classification: 1) Points; 2) Head-to-head points; 3) Head-to-head goal difference; 4) Head-to-head goals scored; 5) Goal difference; 6) Goals scored; 7) Fair-play points; 8) Draw.
(R) Relegated

== Statistics ==
=== Squad appearances and goals ===
No.	Pos	Nat	Player	Total		Liga 1	
No.	Pos	Nat	Player	Apps	Goals	Apps	Goals
Goalkeepers
18	GK	(Philippines) PHI	Julian Schwarzer	26	0	26	0
22	GK	(Indonesia) IDN	Dicki Agung	1	0	0+1	0
23	GK	(Indonesia) IDN	Teguh Amiruddin	7	0	7	0
Defenders
3	DF	(Indonesia) IDN	Bayu Aji	8	0	2+6	0
4	DF	(Indonesia) IDN	Syaeful Anwar	20	0	16+4	0
5	DF	(Indonesia) IDN	Bagas Adi	25	0	21+4	0
12	DF	(Indonesia) IDN	Rifad Marasabessy	15	0	7+8	0
19	DF	(Indonesia) IDN	Achmad Maulana	28	0	24+4	0
26	DF	(Indonesia) IDN	Achmad Figo	12	0	5+7	0
87	DF	(Indonesia) IDN	Johan Alfarizi	17	1	17	1
Midfielders
6	MF	(Colombia) COL	Julián Guevara	14	3	14	3
7	MF	(Argentina) ARG	Ariel Lucero	26	0	22+4	0
8	MF	(Indonesia) IDN	Arkhan Fikri	26	0	12+14	0
14	MF	(Indonesia) IDN	Jayus Hariono	28	0	25+3	0
20	MF	(Indonesia) IDN	Samuel Balinsa	16	0	3+13	0
32	MF	(Brazil) BRA	Charles Almeida	29	2	25+4	2
Forwards
10	FW	(Indonesia) IDN	Muhammad Rafli	25	0	13+12	0
11	FW	(Australia) AUS	Charles Lokolingoy	28	10	20+8	10
17	FW	(Indonesia) IDN	Ginanjar Wahyu	18	1	11+7	1
21	FW	(Indonesia) IDN	Flabio Soares	15	0	0+15	0
27	FW	(Indonesia) IDN	Dedik Setiawan	32	9	27+5	9
41	FW	(Indonesia) IDN	Dendi Santoso	32	0	27+5	0
86	FW	(Indonesia) IDN	Greg Nwokolo	10	0	0+10	0
Players transferred or loaned out during the season the club
9	MF	(Indonesia) IDN	Evan Dimas	6	0	3+3	0
13	FW	(Indonesia) IDN	Hamzah Titofani	0	0	0	0
15	DF	(Mali) MLI	Ichaka Diarra	10	0	8+2	0
16	MF	(Indonesia) IDN	Muhammad Faiz	0	0	0	0
18	MF	(Indonesia) IDN	Kevin Armedyah	0	0	0	0
24	MF	(Indonesia) IDN	Rendra Teddy	0	0	0	0
25	DF	(Indonesia) IDN	Asyraq Gufron	3	0	2+1	0
28	MF	(Indonesia) IDN	Seiya Da Costa Lay	0	0	0	0
29	GK	(Indonesia) IDN	Adixi Lenzivio	1	0	1	0
37	DF	(Indonesia) IDN	Ikhfanul Alam	0	0	0	0
58	DF	(Indonesia) IDN	Mikael Tata	12	0	9+3	0
66	FW	(Indonesia) IDN	Gufroni Al Maruf	0	0	0	0
70	FW	(Brazil) BRA	Gustavo	16	14	15+1	14
78	FW	(Indonesia) IDN	Bramntio Ramadhan	0	0	0	0
79	DF	(Indonesia) IDN	Hamdi Sula	8	0	5+3	0
91	FW	(Bolivia) BOL	Gilbert Álvarez	7	2	3+4	2
97	FW	(Indonesia) IDN	Samsudin	5	0	2+3	0
—	MF	(Indonesia) IDN	Ahmad Bustomi	0	0	0	0
—	MF	(Indonesia) IDN	Iman Budi Hernandi	0	0	0	0
—	MF	(Japan) JPN	Renshi Yamaguchi	0	0	0	0

=== Top scorers ===
The list is sorted by shirt number when total goals are equal.

Rnk	Pos	No.	Player	Liga 1	Total
1	FW	70	(Brazil) Gustavo	14	14
2	FW	11	(Australia) Charles Lokolingoy	10	10
3	FW	27	(Indonesia) Dedik Setiawan	9	9
4	MF	6	(Colombia) Julián Guevara	3	3
5	MF	32	(Brazil) Charles Almeida	2	2
5	FW	91	(Bolivia) Gilbert Álvarez	2	2
7	FW	17	(Indonesia) Ginanjar Wahyu	1	1
7	DF	87	(Indonesia) Johan Alfarizi	1	1
Total				42	42
