= Agung Prasetyo (footballer, born 1978) =

Indonesian footballer (born 1978)

Personal information
- Full name: Agung Prasetyo
- Date of birth: 16 January 1978 (age 48)
- Place of birth: Surabaya, Indonesia
- Height: 1.75 m (5 ft 9 in)
- Position: Goalkeeper

Team information
- Current team: Arema (Goalkeeper Coach)

Senior career*
Years	Team	Apps	(Gls)
1999–2003	Arema	77	(0)
2004–2005	Deltras	36	(0)
2006–2007	PKT Bontang	24	(0)
2007–2008	Persis Solo	38	(0)
2008–2010	Mitra Kukar	27	(0)
2010–2012	Persisam Putra	28	(0)
2012–2014	Gresik United	29	(0)
- * Club domestic league appearances and goals as of 11 July 2012

Agung Prasetyo (born 16 January 1978, in Surabaya) is an Indonesian former footballer.

== Club statistics ==
Club	Season	Super League		Premier Division		Piala Indonesia		Total	
Club	Season	Apps	Goals	Apps	Goals	Apps	Goals	Apps	Goals
Persisam Putra Samarinda	2010-11	4	0	-		-		4	0
Persisam Putra Samarinda	2011-12	23	0	-		-		23	0
Total		27	0	-		-		27	0
