= Samsudin =

Indonesian footballer

Personal information
- Date of birth: 27 March 1997 (age 29)
- Place of birth: Indonesia
- Height: 1.67 m (5 ft 6 in)
- Position: Winger

Team information
- Current team: Persikota Tangerang
- Number: 11

Senior career*
Years	Team	Apps	(Gls)
2019–2020	Babel United	8	(0)
2020	PSG Gresik	0	(0)
2021–2022	Persekat Tegal	10	(1)
2022–2023	Deltras	5	(1)
2023–2024	Arema	5	(0)
2023	→ Persikab Bandung (loan)	12	(0)
2024–2025	Persikota Tangerang	21	(2)
2025–2026	Persekat Tegal	7	(0)
2026–	Persikota Tangerang	1	(0)
- * Club domestic league appearances and goals as of 13 November 2026 (UTC)

Samsudin (born 27 March 1997) is an Indonesian professional footballer who plays as a winger for Liga Nusantara club Persikota Tangerang.

== Club career ==
=== Babel United ===
In 2019, Samsudin signed a contract with Liga 2 club Babel United. He made his league debut on 23 June 2019 in a match against Cilegon United at the Krakatau Steel Stadium. On 7 July 2019, He marked his first win with Babel United in 2019 Liga 2 in a 2–1 home win over PSGC Ciamis.

=== PSG Gresik ===
On 29 January 2020, Samsudin was signed for PSG Gresik to play in Liga 2 in the 2020 season. This season was suspended on 27 March 2020 due to the COVID-19 pandemic. The season was abandoned and was declared void on 20 January 2021.

=== Persekat Tegal ===
Ahead of the 2021–22 season, Samsudin signed a contract with Persekat Tegal. He made his league debut on 27 September, coming on as a starter in a 3–1 win against Badak Lampung. On 18 October 2021, Samsudin scored his first league goal for Persekat, opening the scoring in a 1–3 win against Perserang Serang. He contributed with 10 league appearances, and scored one goal during his 2021–22 season.

=== Deltras ===
Ahead of 2022–23 season, Samsudin joined and signed a contract with Deltras. Samsudin made his league debut on 29 August 2022 in a match against Persewar Waropen at the Gelora Delta Stadium. On 9 September 2022, Samsudin scored his first league goal for Deltras in a 5–0 home win against Kalteng Putra. In his first season with Deltras, Samsudin only went on to make 5 appearances and scored one goal, because Liga 2 was suspended due to a tragedy.

=== Arema ===
On 23 May 2023, Samsudin signed one-year contract with Liga 1 club Arema alongside Brazilian Adilson Maringá. He made his debut on 2 July 2023 in a match against Dewa United at the Indomilk Arena, Tangerang.

== Career statistics ==
=== Club ===
As of 13 November 2026

Club	Season	League			Cup		Continental		Other		Total	
Club	Season	Division	Apps	Goals	Apps	Goals	Apps	Goals	Apps	Goals	Apps	Goals
Babel United	2019	Liga 2	8	0	0	0	–		0	0	8	0
PSG Gresik	2020	Liga 2	0	0	0	0	–		0	0	0	0
Persekat Tegal	2021–22	Liga 2	10	1	0	0	–		0	0	10	1
Deltras	2022–23	Liga 2	5	1	0	0	–		0	0	5	1
Arema	2023–24	Liga 1	5	0	0	0	–		0	0	5	0
Persikab Bandung (loan)	2023–24	Liga 2	12	0	0	0	–		0	0	12	0
Persikota Tangerang	2024–25	Liga 2	21	2	0	0	–		0	0	21	2
Persekat Tegal	2025–26	Liga 2	7	0	0	0	–		0	0	7	0
Persikota Tangerang	2026–27	Liga Nusantara	1	0	0	0	–		0	0	1	0
Career total			69	4	0	0	0	0	0	0	69	4
