= 2020 in Indonesian football =

Football in Indonesia
- Season: 2020

The following article was a summary of the 2020 football season in Indonesia, which was the 22nd competitive season in its history. All of domestic competitions were cancelled due to COVID-19 pandemic.

== Domestic leagues ==
=== Promotion and relegation ===
Promoted to Liga 1

- Persik
- Persita
- Persiraja

Promoted to Liga 2

- Persijap
- PSKC
- Tiga Naga
- Persekat
- Putra Sinar Giri
- Hizbul Wathan (formerly Semeru)

Relegated to Liga 2

- Badak Lampung
- Semen Padang
- Kalteng Putra

Relegated to Liga 3

- PSGC
- Persibat
- Bandung United
- Madura
- Persatu
- PSMP

==== Name changes ====
- Semeru relocated to Sidoarjo and were renamed to Hizbul Wathan.

=== Liga 1 ===
The season was abandoned and declared void on 20 January 2021.

Pos	Team	Pld	W	D	L	GF	GA	GD	Pts	Qualification or relegation
1	Persib	3	3	0	0	7	2	+5	9	
2	Bali United	3	2	1	0	5	2	+3	7	Qualification for the 2021 AFC Cup group stage (Note: Bali United qualified for the 2021 AFC Cup group stage as the 2019 Liga 1 champions.)
3	Borneo	3	2	0	1	6	4	+2	6	
4	Persipura	3	2	0	1	6	5	+1	6	Qualification for the 2021 AFC Cup play-off round (Note: Persipura qualified for the 2021 AFC Cup play-off round as the 2019 Liga 1 third place.)
5	PSIS	3	2	0	1	5	4	+1	6	
6	PSM	3	1	2	0	4	3	+1	5	
7	Persiraja	3	1	2	0	1	0	+1	5	
8	Madura United	3	1	1	1	5	3	+2	4	
9	Persija	2	1	1	0	5	4	+1	4	
10	TIRA-Persikabo	3	1	1	1	3	3	0	4	
11	Bhayangkara	3	0	3	0	3	3	0	3	
12	Arema	3	1	0	2	3	4	−1	3	
13	Persik	3	0	2	1	2	3	−1	2	
14	Persita	3	0	2	1	2	4	−2	2	
15	Persebaya	2	0	1	1	4	5	−1	1	
16	PSS	3	0	1	2	2	4	−2	1	
17	Barito Putera	3	0	1	2	2	7	−5	1	
18	Persela	3	0	0	3	3	8	−5	0	

Source: Shopee Liga 1 2020, Soccerway
Rules for classification: 1) Points; 2) Head-to-head; 3) Goal difference; 4) Goals scored; 5) Drawing.

=== Liga 2 ===
The season was abandoned and declared void on 20 January 2021.

=== Liga 3 ===
The season was abandoned and declared void on 20 January 2021.

== Domestic cups ==
=== Piala Indonesia ===
The tournament was cancelled.

== Continental competitions ==
=== AFC Champions League ===
The 2020 AFC Champions League began on 14 January and was scheduled to end on 28 November 2020. But due to the coronavirus pandemic, the AFC Champions League competition is scheduled to finish on 5 December 2020 with the revised schedule released on 9 July 2020. Bali United were representing Indonesia in the competition, having won the 2019 Liga 1.

==== Bali United ====
14 January 2020 Preliminary round 1	Tampines Rovers (Singapore)	3–5 (a.e.t.)	(Indonesia) Bali United	Kallang, Singapore
18:30 UTC+7	Kopitović 43'; Webb 53'; Rahmat 67' (o.g.)	Report	Platje 8', 13'; Rahmat 82'; Lilipaly 100'; Saimima 115'	Stadium: Jalan Besar Stadium; Attendance: 1,400; Referee: Ahmad Yacoub Ibrahim (Jordan)

21 January 2020 Preliminary round 2	Melbourne Victory (Australia)	5–0	(Indonesia) Bali United	Melbourne, Australia
15:35 UTC+7	Basha 14'; Hope 37'; Kruse 59'; Toivonen 81'; Kamsoba 90'	Report		Stadium: AAMI Park; Attendance: 5,387; Referee: Mohammed Al-Hoish (Saudi Arabia)

=== AFC Cup ===
The 2020 AFC Cup began on 21 January and was scheduled to end on 7 November 2020. But due to the coronavirus pandemic, the AFC Cup competition is scheduled to finish on 12 December 2020 with the revised schedule released on 9 July 2020. PSM were representing Indonesia in the competition, having won the 2018–19 Piala Indonesia. Bali United were also representing Indonesia in the competition after failed to qualify for AFC Champions League group stage. The season was abandoned on 10 September and was declared void the following day due to the COVID-19 pandemic in Asia.

==== PSM ====
22 January 2020 Play-off round 1st leg	Lalenok United (Timor-Leste)	1–4	(Indonesia) PSM	Gianyar, Indonesia
14:30 UTC+7	Adade 2'	Report	Ferdinand 12', 69', 72'; Giancarlo 41'	Stadium: Kapten I Wayan Dipta Stadium; Attendance: 335; Referee: Chen Hsin-chuan (Chinese Taipei)

29 January 2020 Play-off round 2nd leg	PSM (Indonesia)	3–1 (7–2 agg.)	(Timor-Leste) Lalenok United	Cibinong, Indonesia
15:30 UTC+7	Giancarlo 5'; Ferdinand 29'; Irsyad 84'	Report	Da Costa 60'	Stadium: Pakansari Stadium; Attendance: 686; Referee: Hasan Akrami (Iran)

12 February 2020 Group stage	Tampines Rovers (Singapore)	2–1	(Indonesia) PSM	Kallang, Singapore
18:45 UTC+7	Webb 24'; Kopitović 64'	Report	Sinaga 68'	Stadium: Jalan Besar Stadium; Referee: Mooud Bonyadifar (Iran)

26 February 2020 Group stage	PSM (Indonesia)	3–1	(Myanmar) Shan United	Jakarta, Indonesia
15:30 UTC+7	Giancarlo 3'; Sayuri 53'; Sinaga 90+5'	Report	Htet Phyo Wai 78'	Stadium: Gelora Bung Karno Madya Stadium; Referee: Yudai Yamamoto (Japan)

10 March 2020 Group stage	PSM (Indonesia)	1–1	(Philippines) Kaya–Iloilo	Jakarta, Indonesia
15:30 UTC+7	Saha 22'	Report	Giganto 50'	Stadium: Gelora Bung Karno Madya Stadium; Attendance: 0 Referee: C. R. Srikrishna (India)

23 September 2020 Group stage	Kaya–Iloilo (Philippines)	Cancelled	(Indonesia) PSM	TBD
		Report		Stadium: TBD

26 September 2020 Group stage	PSM (Indonesia)	Cancelled	(Singapore) Tampines Rovers	TBD
		Report		Stadium: TBD

29 September 2020 Group stage	Shan United (Myanmar)	Cancelled	(Indonesia) PSM	TBD
		Report		Stadium: TBD

==== Bali United ====
11 February 2020 Group stage	Bali United (Indonesia)	4–1	(Vietnam) Than Quảng Ninh	Gianyar, Indonesia
18:30 UTC+7	Rahmat 46'; Platje 50', 77'; Spasojević 73' (pen.)	Report	Lynch 20'	Stadium: Kapten I Wayan Dipta Stadium; Attendance: 5,750; Referee: Masoud Tufayelieh (Syria)

25 February 2020 Group stage	Svay Rieng (Cambodia)	2–1	(Indonesia) Bali United	Phnom Penh, Cambodia
18:00 UTC+7	Phallin 12'; Mbarga 19'	Report	Spasojević 59'	Stadium: Phnom Penh Olympic Stadium; Attendance: 2,106; Referee: Mahmood Al-Majarafi (Oman)

11 March 2020 Group stage	Ceres–Negros (Philippines)	4–0	(Indonesia) Bali United	Manila, Philippines
18:30 UTC+7	Porteria 35'; Marañón 54' (pen.), 69'; Lopez Mendy 73'	Report		Stadium: Rizal Memorial Stadium; Attendance: 0 Referee: Sadullo Gulmurodi (Tajikistan)

23 September 2020 Group stage	Bali United (Indonesia)	Cancelled	(Philippines) Ceres–Negros	Quảng Ninh, Vietnam
		Report		Stadium: Cẩm Phả Stadium

26 September 2020 Group stage	Than Quảng Ninh (Vietnam)	Cancelled	(Indonesia) Bali United	Quảng Ninh, Vietnam
		Report		Stadium: Cẩm Phả Stadium

29 September 2020 Group stage	Bali United (Indonesia)	Cancelled	(Cambodia) Svay Rieng	Quảng Ninh, Vietnam
		Report		Stadium: Cẩm Phả Stadium

== National teams ==
=== Men's senior ===
==== Friendlies ====
The following is a list of friendlies (to be) played by the men's senior national team in 2020.

21 February 2020 Friendly	Indonesia	1–4	(Indonesia) Persita	Jakarta, Indonesia
	Pora	Report	Irianto (o.g.); Arif; Hasanović; Al Achya	Stadium: Gelora Bung Karno Madya Stadium; Attendance: 0

=== Men's under-19 ===
==== Friendlies ====
The following is a list of friendlies (to be) played by the men's under-19 national team in 2020.

24 January 2020 Friendly	Indonesia	0–2	(South Korea) Kyung Hee University	Chiang Mai, Thailand
		Report		Stadium: Alpine Football Camp Training

25 January 2020 Friendly	Indonesia	0–2	(South Korea) Seongnam	Chiang Mai, Thailand
		Report		Stadium: Alpine Football Camp Training

27 January 2020 Friendly	Indonesia	1–5	(South Korea) Busan IPark	Chiang Mai, Thailand
	Jauhari	Report		Stadium: Alpine Football Camp Training

29 January 2020 Friendly	Indonesia	2–1	(South Korea) Kyung Hee University	Chiang Mai, Thailand
	Ridho; Trisnanda	Report		Stadium: Alpine Football Camp Training

31 January 2020 Friendly	Indonesia	0–2	(South Korea) Bucheon 1995	Chiang Mai, Thailand
		Report		Stadium: Alpine Football Camp Training

5 September 2020 Friendly tournament	Bulgaria	3–0	Indonesia	Sveti Martin na Muri, Croatia
22:00 UTC+7	Petkov 78', 88'; Shopov 82'	Report		Stadium: Igraliste NK Polet Stadium

8 September 2020 Friendly tournament	Croatia	7–1	Indonesia	Čakovec, Croatia
20:30 UTC+7	Zrilić 26'; Brković 31'; Boras 44'; Marin 46', 73'; Zdunić 66'; Brnić 90' (pen.)	Report	Bagas 70'	Stadium: SRC Mladost Stadium

11 September 2020 Friendly tournament	Indonesia	3–3	Saudi Arabia	Sveti Martin na Muri, Croatia
21:00 UTC+7	Jauhari 45+1'; Saddam 53'; Braif 90+2'	Report	Alabsi 27' (pen.); Marran 33' (pen.); Althekralla 37'	Stadium: Igraliste NK Polet Stadium

17 September 2020 Int'l Friendly	Qatar	1–2	Indonesia	Čakovec, Croatia
21:00 UTC+7	Al Mehairi 12'	Report	Brylian 18' (pen.); Supriadi 84'	Stadium: SRC Mladost Stadium

20 September 2020 Int'l Friendly	Indonesia	1–1	Qatar	Velika Gorica, Croatia
21:00 UTC+7	Saddam 62'	Report	Altairi 90' (pen.)	Stadium: Stadion Radnik

25 September 2020 Int'l Friendly	Indonesia	0–1	Bosnia and Herzegovina	Sveti Martin na Muri, Croatia
21:00 UTC+7		Report	Komang Tri 19' (o.g.)	Stadium: Igraliste NK Polet Stadium

28 September 2020 Friendly	Indonesia	1–0	(Croatia) Dinamo Zagreb U19s	Zagreb, Croatia
21:00 UTC+7	Witan 38'	Report		Stadium: Stadion Maksimir Complex

8 October 2020 Friendly	Indonesia	3–0	(Croatia) Dugopolje U19s	Split, Croatia
20:00 UTC+7	Braif 3'; Brylian 15' (pen.); Witan 21'	Report		Stadium: NK Uskok Klis Stadium

11 October 2020 Int'l Friendly	Indonesia	4–1	North Macedonia	Sinj, Croatia
20:00 UTC+7	Witan 13'; Brown 58', 69'; Jauhari 83'	Report	Todorovski 46' (pen.)	Stadium: NK Junak Sinj Stadium

14 October 2020 Int'l Friendly	Indonesia	0–0	North Macedonia	Sinj, Croatia
19:45 UTC+7		Report		Stadium: NK Junak Sinj Stadium

20 October 2020 Friendly	Indonesia	4–0	(Croatia) Hajduk Split U19s	Split, Croatia
16:00 UTC+7	Bagas 19'; Arhan 48' (pen.); Beckham 53' (pen.); Brown 78'	Report		Stadium: Sloga Mravince Stadium

=== Men's under-16 ===
==== Friendlies ====
The following is a list of friendlies (to be) played by the men's under-16 national team in 2020.

23 January 2020 Friendly	Indonesia	5–1	(Indonesia) PSBK U17s	Sidoarjo, Indonesia
17:00 UTC+7	Marselino 4', 21'; Wahyu 12'; Athallah 42'; Frezy 64'	Report	Nova 67'	Stadium: Gelora Delta Stadium

29 January 2020 Friendly	Indonesia	4–0	(Indonesia) YLT Probolinggo	Sidoarjo, Indonesia
		Report		Stadium: Gelora Delta Stadium
Note: Trofeo format.

29 January 2020 Friendly	Indonesia	4–0	(Indonesia) GSI East Java	Sidoarjo, Indonesia
		Report		Stadium: Gelora Delta Stadium
Note: Trofeo format.

22 February 2020 Friendly	Indonesia	0–0	(Indonesia) PSS U16s	Sleman, Indonesia
		Report		Stadium: Islamic University of Indonesia Football Field
Note: Trofeo format.

22 February 2020 Friendly	Indonesia	4–0	(Indonesia) PPU East Kalimantan	Sleman, Indonesia
		Report		Stadium: Islamic University of Indonesia Football Field
Note: Trofeo format.

28 February 2020 Friendly	Indonesia	1–1	(Indonesia) PSS U16s	Sleman, Indonesia
		Report		Stadium: Islamic University of Indonesia Football Field

13 March 2020 Friendly	Indonesia	1–1	(Indonesia) Porda Bekasi	Bekasi, Indonesia
	Kamuru 77'	Report		Stadium: Patriot Candrabhaga Stadium

24 July 2020 Friendly	Indonesia	5–0	(Indonesia) Askab Bekasi U18s	Bekasi, Indonesia
	Marcell 30'; Athallah 40'; Valentino 48'; Wahyu 69', 73'	Report		Stadium: Patriot Candrabhaga Stadium

28 July 2020 Friendly	Indonesia	0–0	(Indonesia) Bina Taruna U18s	Bekasi, Indonesia
		Report		Stadium: Patriot Candrabhaga Stadium

14 August 2020 Friendly	Indonesia	2–0	(Indonesia) SSB POR Uni Bandung	Bekasi, Indonesia
	Athallah 60'; Faizal 42'	Report		Stadium: Patriot Candrabhaga Stadium

24 August 2020 Friendly	Indonesia	4–1	(Indonesia) Askab Bandung U18s	Bekasi, Indonesia
	Faizal 20'; Athallah 30'; Raka 35'; Valeron 68'	Report		Stadium: Patriot Candrabhaga Stadium

28 August 2020 Friendly	Indonesia	1–0	(Indonesia) Student National Team	Bekasi, Indonesia
		Report		Stadium: Patriot Candrabhaga Stadium

21 October 2020 Int'l Friendly	United Arab Emirates	3–2	Indonesia	Dubai, United Arab Emirates
	Adill 25', 52', 74'	Report	Raka 5'; Athallah 40'	Stadium: UEA FA Field

24 October 2020 Int'l Friendly	United Arab Emirates	4–0	Indonesia	Dubai, United Arab Emirates
	Ahmed 16'; Alali 26'; Adill 75'; Ali 79'	Report		Stadium: UEA FA Field
