= 2020 Piala Indonesia =

Indonesian football tournament

Tournament details
- Country: Indonesia

The 2020 Piala Indonesia was intended as the eighth edition of the Piala Indonesia football tournament Like many other events of the time, the tournament was postponed then cancelled due to the COVID-19 pandemic.

PSM was unable to defend its 2019 title.

== See also ==
- 2020 Liga 1
- 2020 Liga 2
- 2020 Liga 3
