= Gufroni Al Maruf =

Indonesian association footballer

Personal information
- Full name: Gufroni Al Maruf
- Date of birth: 30 November 1996 (age 29)
- Place of birth: Malang, Indonesia
- Height: 1.72 m (5 ft 8 in)
- Position: Winger

Team information
- Current team: Isenmulang Kalteng
- Number: 66

Senior career*
Years	Team	Apps	(Gls)
2017	Persegres Gresik United	18	(1)
2018	Madura	21	(4)
2019–2021	Madura United	8	(0)
2020	→ Persis Solo (loan)	0	(0)
2021	TIRA-Persikabo	0	(0)
2021–2023	Dewa United	16	(2)
2023–2024	Arema	0	(0)
2023–2024	→ Persikab Bandung (loan)	15	(1)
2024–2025	PSKC Cimahi	16	(2)
2025–2026	Kendal Tornado	20	(2)
2026–	Isenmulang Kalteng	3	(0)
- * Club domestic league appearances and goals as of 22:00, 19 September 2026 (UTC)

Gufroni Al Maruf (born 30 November 1996) is an Indonesian professional footballer who plays as a right winger for Super League club Isenmulang Kalteng.

== Club career ==
=== Gresik United ===
He made his professional debut in the Liga 1 on 18 April 2017, against Persipura Jayapura at the Mandala Stadium, Jayapura.

=== Madura FC ===
In 2018 Gufroni signed with Madura for the 2018 Liga 2. He made 21 league appearances and scored 4 goals for Madura FC.

=== Madura United ===
He was signed for Madura United to play in Liga 1 in the 2019 season.

==== Persis Solo (loan) ====
He was signed for Persis Solo to play in Liga 2 in the 2020 season, on loan from Madura United. This season was suspended on 27 March 2020 due to the COVID-19 pandemic. The season was abandoned and was declared void on 20 January 2021.

=== Persikabo 1973 ===
In 2021, Gufroni signed a contract with Indonesian Liga 1 club Persikabo 1973.

=== Dewa United FC ===
In 2021, Gufroni signed a contract with Indonesian Liga 2 club Dewa United. He made his league debut on 28 September against RANS Cilegon at the Gelora Bung Karno Madya Stadium, Jakarta.

== Honours ==
=== Club ===
Dewa United

- Liga 2 third place (play-offs): 2021
