= Mikael Tata =

Indonesian footballer

Personal information
- Full name: Mikael Alfredo Tata
- Date of birth: 10 May 2004 (age 22)
- Place of birth: Serui, Indonesia
- Height: 1.74 m (5 ft 9 in)
- Position: Left-back

Team information
- Current team: Persebaya Surabaya
- Number: 15

Youth career
- 2019–2021: Persipura Jayapura

Senior career*
Years	Team	Apps	(Gls)
2021–2022	Waanal Brothers	5	(0)
2023	Arema	12	(0)
2023–	Persebaya Surabaya	41	(1)

International career^{‡}
2019	Indonesia U16	5	(0)
2022	Indonesia U20	7	(0)
2025–	Indonesia U23	5	(0)
2024–	Indonesia	1	(0)
Medal record
Men's football
Representing Indonesia
AFF U-16 Youth Championship
Third place	2019 Thailand
- * Club domestic league appearances and goals as of 9 May 2026 ‡ National team caps and goals as of 18 November 2025

Mikael Alfredo Tata (born 10 May 2004) is an Indonesian professional footballer who plays as a left-back for Super League club Persebaya Surabaya and the Indonesia national team.

== Club career ==
Tata started his career by joining amateurs club Waanal Brothers to play in Liga 3.

=== Arema ===
On 26 June 2023, Tata signed a contract with Liga 1 club Arema, he will join fellow new signings Asyraq Gufron. Tata made his professional debut on 2 July 2023 as a starter in a 0–1 away lose over Dewa United.

== International career ==
In February 2022, it was reported that Tata received a call-up from the Indonesia U-20 for a training camp, in South Korea. On 29 March 2022, Tata made his debut for Indonesia U-20 against South Korea U-20, in a 5–1 defeat in a friendly match.

On 25 November 2024, Tata received a called up to the preliminary squad to the Indonesia national senior team for the 2024 ASEAN Championship.

== Career statistics ==
=== International ===
As of match played 15 December 2024

Appearances and goals by national team and year
National team	Year	Apps	Goals
Indonesia	2024	1	0
Total		1	0

== Honours ==
Persebaya Surabaya

- Piala Presiden: 2026
