= Andy Harjito =

Indonesian footballer

Personal information
- Full name: Muhammad Andy Harjito
- Date of birth: 27 September 2001 (age 25)
- Place of birth: Kudus, Indonesia
- Height: 1.80 m (5 ft 11 in)
- Position: Forward

Team information
- Current team: Persis Solo
- Number: 22

Youth career
- 2017–2018: Persiku Kudus

Senior career*
Years	Team	Apps	(Gls)
2019–2021	Persiku Kudus	8	(0)
2022–2024	Borneo Samarinda	11	(2)
2023–2024	→ PSM Makassar (loan)	12	(1)
2025	Borneo Samarinda	2	(0)
2025–2026	PSPS Pekanbaru	10	(1)
2026	→ Kendal Tornado (loan)	7	(0)
2026–	Persis Solo	6	(1)

International career
2023	Indonesia U23	1	(0)
- * Club domestic league appearances and goals as of 24 October 2026

Muhammad Andy Harjito (born 27 September 2001) is an Indonesian professional footballer who plays as a forward for Championship club Persis Solo.

== Club career ==
=== Borneo Samarinda ===
He was signed for Borneo Samarinda to play in Liga 1 in the 2022 season. Harjito made his professional debut on 13 September 2022 and scored his first league in injury time of second half and saved Borneo Samarinda from losing to Bhayangkara. score draw 2–2. The goal he scored was the first in his career as a professional footballer. He scored his league goal for the club, opening the scoring in a 1–3 won against Bali United on 15 December 2022 at Sultan Agung Stadium.

==== Loan to PSM Makassar ====
Harjito was signed for PSM Makassar to play in Liga 1 in the 2023–24 season, on loan from Borneo Samarinda. He made his debut on 3 July 2023 in a match against Persija Jakarta at the Gelora Bung Karno Stadium, Jakarta.

== International career ==
In April 2023, Harjito was called up to the Indonesia U22 for the training centre in preparation for 2023 SEA Games. Harjito made his international debut on 14 April 2023 in a friendly match against Lebanon U22 at Gelora Bung Karno Stadium, Jakarta.

== Career statistics ==
=== Club ===
As of 24 October 2026

Club	Season	League			Cup		Continental		Other		Total	
Club	Season	Division	Apps	Goals	Apps	Goals	Apps	Goals	Apps	Goals	Apps	Goals
Persiku Kudus	2019	Liga 3	4	0	0	0	–		0	0	4	0
Persiku Kudus	2020	Liga 3	0	0	0	0	–		0	0	0	0
Persiku Kudus	2021	Liga 3	4	0	0	0	–		0	0	4	0
Borneo Samarinda	2022–23	Liga 1	11	2	0	0	–		0	0	11	2
PSM Makassar (loan)	2023–24	Liga 1	12	1	0	0	3	0	0	0	15	1
PSM Makassar	2024–25	Liga 1	0	0	0	0	0	0	0	0	0	0
Borneo Samarinda	2024–25	Liga 1	2	0	0	0	0	0	0	0	2	0
PSPS Pekanbaru	2025–26	Championship	10	1	0	0	–		0	0	10	1
Kendal Tornado (loan)	2025–26	Championship	7	0	0	0	–		0	0	7	0
Persis Solo	2026–27	Championship	6	1	0	0	–		0	0	6	1
Career total			56	5	0	0	3	0	0	0	59	5

== Honours ==
Borneo Samarinda

- Piala Presiden runner-up: 2022
