= 2020 Liga 2 (Indonesia) =

Liga 2
- Season: 2020
- Champions: Not awarded
- Promoted: None
- Relegated: None

The 2020 Liga 2 was the fourth season of the Liga 2 under its current name and the 11th season under its current league structure. The season was suspended on 27 March 2020 due to the COVID-19 pandemic. The season was abandoned and was declared void on 20 January 2021.

== Overview ==
=== Original format changes ===
Major changes occur in the league format this season. The second round, which consisting of eight teams (the best four from each region) will be removed this season. The winner of each region will be immediately promoted and qualified for the final. While the second place in each region will be qualified for the third place playoff and the last promotion place. The season started on 14 March and is scheduled to finish on 3 October 2020.

== Teams ==
=== Team changes ===
The following teams have changed division since the 2019 season.

To Liga 2

Relegated from Liga 1

- Badak Lampung
- Kalteng Putra
- Semen Padang

Promoted from Liga 3

- Persijap
- PSKC
- Tiga Naga
- Persekat
- Putra Sinar Giri
- Hizbul Wathan (formerly Semeru)
From Liga 2

Promoted to Liga 1

- Persik
- Persita
- Persiraja

Relegated to Liga 3

- PSGC
- Persibat
- Bandung United
- Madura
- Persatu
- PSMP

=== Name changes ===
- Semeru relocated to Sidoarjo and were renamed to Hizbul Wathan.
- Babel United merged with Muba United into Muba Babel United and relocated to Musi Banyuasin.
- Putra Sinar Giri (PSG Gresik) relocated to Pati and were renamed to Putra Safin Group Pati (PSG Pati).

=== Personnel and kits ===
Note: Flags indicate national team as has been defined under FIFA eligibility rules. Players and coaches may hold more than one non-FIFA nationality.

Team	Head coach	Captain	Kit manufacturer	Shirt Sponsor(s)
Badak Lampung	(Spain) Rafael Berges	(Indonesia) Saepulloh Maulana	Mar10	Sunpride^{1}, Indofood^{1}, M-150^{1}, Bukalapak^{2}, Kredit Plus^{2}
Cilegon United	(Indonesia) Herry Kiswanto		Mattch	PT Krakatau Industrial Estate Cilegon^{1}, PT Cilegon Putra Mandala^{2}
Kalteng Putra	(Indonesia) Eko Tamamie	(Indonesia) Fauzan Jamal	Adhoc	Halo Dayak^{1}, Bank Kalteng^{1}
Hizbul Wathan	(Indonesia) Yusuf Ekodono	(Indonesia) Juan Revi	Made by club	Muhammadiyah University of Malang^{1}, Muhammadiyah University of Sidoarjo^{1}, Muhammadiyah University of Surabaya^{1}, Muhammadiyah University of Gresik^{1}, Muhammadiyah University of Jember^{1}, Muhammadiyah University of Purwokerto^{1}, Muhammadiyah University of Lamongan^{1}, Muhammadiyah East Java^{2}
Martapura	(Indonesia) Frans Sinatra Huwae		Trops	
Mitra Kukar	(Indonesia) Jafri Sastra	(Indonesia) Anindito Wahyu	Joma	ABP Energy^{1}
Muba Babel United	(Indonesia) Bambang Nurdiansyah	(Indonesia) Rian Miziar	GW	Muba Corporate Forum^{1}, J&F Coffee^{3}
Persekat	(Indonesia) Nazal Mustofa	(Indonesia) Qischil Minny	Grande	Triplogic^{1}, Plus Enam Dua^{1}, P3B^{1}, RS Mitra Siaga^{1}, Bhamada^{3}, Yapora^{3}
Perserang	(Indonesia) Putut Wijanarko	(Indonesia) Idang Novriza Ali	XCollabs	Next Gen^{1}, BookMyShow^{2}
Persewar	(Indonesia) Elie Aiboy	(Indonesia) Victor Pae	Sevstar	
Persiba	(Argentina) Alfredo Vera	(Indonesia) Bryan Cesar	GW	Indika Energy^{1}, Pancoran Soccer Field^{2}
Persijap	(Indonesia) Widyantoro	(Indonesia) Asri Akbar	Trops	Oasis Waters^{1}, MNC Vision Networks^{1}, RCTI+^{1}
Persis	(Indonesia) Salahudin	(Indonesia) Bruno Casimir	DJ Sport	
PSBS	(Argentina) Marcelo Cirelli	(Indonesia) Patrias Rumere	Artland	Bank Papua^{1}, Pemerintah Kabupaten Biak Numfor^{1}, Pesona Biak^{2}
PSCS	(Indonesia) Jaya Hartono	(Indonesia) Mochamad Arifin	Artland	S2P^{1}, Bank Jateng^{1}
PSIM	(Indonesia) Seto Nurdiantoro	(Indonesia) Purwaka Yudhi	Made by club	Krating Daeng^{1}, Teh Kotak^{1}, Bank Mandiri^{1}, Tolak Angin^{2}
PSKC	(Indonesia) Robby Darwis	(Indonesia) Atep Rizal	MBB	BNI^{1}
PSMS	(Brazil) Gomes de Olivera	(Indonesia) Legimin Raharjo	Adhoc	Pelindo 1^{1}, Bank Sumut^{1}
PSPS	Vacant	(Indonesia) Danil Junaidi	Curva Sport	OSO Group^{1}, Sportivo^{1}
Putra Sinar Giri	(Indonesia) Ibnu Grahan		Mills	
Semen Padang	(Portugal) Eduardo Almeida	(Indonesia) Nur Iskandar	Ghanior	Semen Indonesia Group^{1}
Sriwijaya	(Indonesia) Budiardjo Thalib	(Indonesia) Ambrizal	Calci	Bukit Asam^{1}, Bank Sumsel Babel^{1}, Perusahaan Gas Negara^{2}, TEL^{2}, PT Oki Pulp & Paper^{2}
Sulut United	(Indonesia) Ricky Nelson	(Indonesia) Yudi Khoerudin	Classico	Bukalapak^{1}, Smartfren^{1}, PT Minahasa Cahaya Lestari^{1}
Tiga Naga	(Indonesia) Feryandes Rozialta	(Indonesia) Ghulam Fatkhur	Maknorukun	Skor.id^{1}

Notes:

1. On the front of shirt.
2. On the back of shirt.
3. On the sleeves.
4. On the shorts.

=== Coaching changes ===
Team	Outgoing coach	Manner of departure	Date of vacancy	Position in table	Incoming coach	Date of appointment
PSMS	(Indonesia) Jafri Sastra	End of contract	20 December 2019	Pre-season	(Indonesia) Philip Hansen	3 January 2020
Sriwijaya	(Indonesia) Kas Hartadi	End of contract	25 December 2019	Pre-season	(Indonesia) Budiardjo Thalib	25 December 2019
Perserang	(Indonesia) Jaya Hartono	Signed by PSCS	27 December 2019	Pre-season	(Indonesia) Putut Wijanarko	7 February 2020
PSCS	(Indonesia) Djoko Susilo	End of contract	27 December 2019	Pre-season	(Indonesia) Jaya Hartono	27 December 2019
Persiba	(Indonesia) Satia Badgja	End of contract	30 December 2019	Pre-season	(Argentina) Alfredo Vera	30 December 2019
Badak Lampung	(Slovenia) Milan Petrović	End of contract	31 December 2019	Pre-season	(Spain) Rafael Berges	22 January 2020
Hizbul Wathan	(Indonesia) Stefan Keeltjes	End of contract	31 December 2019	Pre-season	(Indonesia) Yusuf Ekodono	26 February 2020
PSBS	(Indonesia) Slamet Riyadi	End of contract	31 December 2019	Pre-season	(Argentina) Marcelo Cirelli	27 February 2020
Cilegon United	(Indonesia) Imam Riyadi	End of contract	31 December 2019	Pre-season	(Indonesia) Herry Kiswanto	1 March 2020
Kalteng Putra	(Brazil) Gomes de Olivera	End of contract	31 December 2019	Pre-season	(Indonesia) Eko Tamamie	3 March 2020
Persekat	(Indonesia) Lukman Afif	Demoted to assistant coach	2 January 2020	Pre-season	(Indonesia) Nazal Mustofa	2 January 2020
Mitra Kukar	(Spain) Rafael Berges	Signed by Badak Lampung	22 January 2020	Pre-season	(Indonesia) Jafri Sastra	7 February 2020
Muba Babel United	(Indonesia) I Putu Gede	Signed by Putra Sinar Giri	25 January 2020	Pre-season	(Indonesia) Bambang Nurdiansyah	10 March 2020
Putra Sinar Giri	(Indonesia) Khoirul Anam	Demoted to assistant coach	25 January 2020	Pre-season	(Indonesia) I Putu Gede	25 January 2020
PSIM	(Indonesia) Liestiadi	End of contract	29 January 2020	Pre-season	(Indonesia) Seto Nurdiantoro	29 January 2020
Persijap	(Indonesia) Sahala Saragih	Resigned	5 February 2020	Pre-season	(Indonesia) Widyantoro	8 February 2020
PSMS	(Indonesia) Philip Hansen	Resigned	17 September 2020	Pre-season	(Brazil) Gomes de Olivera	17 September 2020
PSPS	(Malaysia) Raja Isa	Signed by Muktijoddha Sangsad	24 December 2020	Pre-season		
Putra Sinar Giri	(Indonesia) I Putu Gede	Released	26 December 2020	Pre-season	(Indonesia) Ibnu Grahan	26 December 2020

== Preliminary round (Original format before the first abandonment) ==
=== West region ===
Pos	Team	Pld	W	D	L	GF	GA	GD	Pts	Qualification or relegation
1	Muba Babel United	1	1	0	0	3	0	+3	3	Promoted to Liga 1 and advanced to the final
2	PSPS Riau	1	1	0	0	3	0	+3	3	Advance to the third place playoff
3	Badak Lampung	1	1	0	0	2	0	+2	3	
4	Perserang	1	1	0	0	2	0	+2	3	
5	PSMS	1	1	0	0	2	1	+1	3	
6	Sriwijaya	1	1	0	0	2	1	+1	3	
7	PSIM	1	0	0	1	1	2	−1	0	
8	Tiga Naga	1	0	0	1	1	2	−1	0	
9	Cilegon United	1	0	0	1	0	2	−2	0	
10	PSKC	1	0	0	1	0	2	−2	0	Relegation to Liga 3
11	Persekat	1	0	0	1	0	3	−3	0	Relegation to Liga 3
12	Semen Padang	1	0	0	1	0	3	−3	0	Relegation to Liga 3

Updated to match(es) played on 15 March 2020. Source: Standings Liga 2 Group Barat
Rules for classification: 1) Points; 2) Head-to-head; 3) Goal difference; 4) Goals scored; 5) Drawing.

Home \ Away	BDL	CLG	MBU	KAT	SER	YOG	PKC	MED	RIA	SPD	SRI	TNG
Badak Lampung	—						2–0					
Cilegon United		—			0–2							
Muba Babel United			—	3–0								
Persekat				—								
Perserang					—							
PSIM						—						
PSKC							—					
PSMS								—				2–1
PSPS Riau									—	3–0		
Semen Padang										—		
Sriwijaya						2–1					—	
Tiga Naga												—

Updated to match(es) played on 15 March 2020. Source: Fixtures Liga 2
Legend: Blue = home team win; Yellow = draw; Red = away team win.
For upcoming matches, an "a" indicates there is an article about the rivalry between the two participants.

=== East region ===
Pos	Team	Pld	W	D	L	GF	GA	GD	Pts	Qualification or relegation
1	Mitra Kukar	1	1	0	0	2	0	+2	3	Promoted to Liga 1 and advanced to the final
2	Persiba	1	1	0	0	3	2	+1	3	Advance to the third place playoff
3	Persijap	1	1	0	0	1	0	+1	3	
4	Sulut United	1	1	0	0	1	0	+1	3	
5	Persewar	0	0	0	0	0	0	0	0	
6	Persis	0	0	0	0	0	0	0	0	
7	PSCS	0	0	0	0	0	0	0	0	
8	Putra Sinar Giri	0	0	0	0	0	0	0	0	
9	Kalteng Putra	1	0	0	1	2	3	−1	0	
10	Hizbul Wathan	1	0	0	1	0	1	−1	0	Relegation to Liga 3
11	PSBS	1	0	0	1	0	1	−1	0	Relegation to Liga 3
12	Martapura	1	0	0	1	0	2	−2	0	Relegation to Liga 3

Updated to match(es) played on 15 March 2020. Source: Standings Liga 2 Group Timur
Rules for classification: 1) Points; 2) Head-to-head; 3) Goal difference; 4) Goals scored; 5) Drawing.

Home \ Away	HZW	KTP	MTP	MKU	PWR	PBA	PJP	SOL	BIA	CLP	PSG	SUL
Hizbul Wathan	—											
Kalteng Putra		—										
Martapura			—									
Mitra Kukar			2–0	—								
Persewar					—							
Persiba		3–2				—						
Persijap	1–0						—					
Persis								—				
PSBS									—			0–1
PSCS										—		
Putra Sinar Giri											—	
Sulut United												—

Updated to match(es) played on 15 March 2020. Source: Fixtures Liga 2
Legend: Blue = home team win; Yellow = draw; Red = away team win.
For upcoming matches, an "a" indicates there is an article about the rivalry between the two participants.

== Effects of the COVID-19 pandemic ==
The season was suspended on 15 March 2020 after finishing the matchday one due to the COVID-19 pandemic. The initial suspension was until the end of March, which was then extended to 29 May.

On 7 August 2020, PT Liga Indonesia Baru made several announcements. The season will be restarted from the beginning with a different format. In the first round, 24 teams will be drawn into four groups consisting of six teams. All groups will be played a home tournament format where teams play each other once. Group winners and runners-ups will be advance to the second round, which will be drawn into two groups of four. Two best teams will be qualified to the semi-finals. Semi-finals and final will be played a single-legged fixtures. Two finalists will be promoted to Liga 1. All matches will be held and played behind closed doors.

The draw of the second format was held on 19 August 2020 virtually. The draw resulted in the following groups, but because of COVID-19 pandemic no single match has been played :

Group A
Pos	Team
A1	Badak Lampung (Host)
A2	Muba Babel United
A3	Perserang
A4	PSBS
A5	Cilegon United
A6	Persewar

Group B
Pos	Team
B1	PSCS (Host)
B2	Kalteng Putra
B3	Persiba
B4	PSKC
B5	Persis
B6	Hizbul Wathan

Group C
Pos	Team
C1	PSPS (Host)
C2	Mitra Kukar
C3	Martapura
C4	Putra Sinar Giri
C5	Tiga Naga
C6	PSIM

Group D
Pos	Team
D1	PSMS (Host)
D2	Sulut United
D3	Semen Padang
D4	Persekat
D5	Persijap
D6	Sriwijaya

After failing to obtain government and police permissions for the umpteenth time, PSSI on 29 September 2020 announced the second postponement of the 2020 season of Liga 1 and Liga 2. This time the initial suspension had a one-month period. After the end date was reached, PSSI on 29 October 2020 declared the 2020 football seasons could not be held in 2020. There was an attempt to resume the 2020 season in 2021. However, on 15 January 2021, PSSI decided to cancel the 2020 season of all football competitions and declared them void.

== See also ==
- 2020 Liga 1
- 2020 Liga 3
- 2020 Piala Indonesia
