= Vico (footballer) =

Brazilian footballer

Personal information
- Full name: Vinicius Duarte
- Date of birth: 3 December 1996 (age 29)
- Place of birth: Cascavel, Brazil
- Height: 1.74 m (5 ft 9 in)
- Positions: Winger; attacking midfielder

Team information
- Current team: Persis Solo
- Number: 10

Youth career
- Grêmio

Senior career*
Years	Team	Apps	(Gls)
2017–2019	Grêmio	5	(0)
2019	→ Ponte Preta (loan)	13	(3)
2020–2022	Vitória	33	(5)
2022	CRB	8	(0)
2022	Dhofar Club	0	(0)
2023	Atlético Goianiense	4	(0)
2023	Mirassol	8	(0)
2023–2024	Ipatinga	9	(0)
2024	Confiança	17	(2)
2025	PSS Sleman	16	(2)
2025–2026	Java United	12	(0)
2026	→ Dewa United Banten (loan)	7	(2)
2026–	Persis Solo	4	(1)
Medal record
Grêmio
Winner	Campeonato Gaúcho	2018
- * Club domestic league appearances and goals as of 24 October 2026

Vinicius Duarte (born 3 December 1996), commonly known as Vico, is a Brazilian professional footballer who plays as a winger or attacking midfielder for Championship club Persis Solo.

== Career statistics ==
=== Club ===
As of 13 May 2020.

Club	Season	League			State League		Cup		Continental		Other		Total	
Club	Season	Division	Apps	Goals	Apps	Goals	Apps	Goals	Apps	Goals	Apps	Goals	Apps	Goals
Grêmio	2017	Série A	1	0	0	0	0	0	–		0	0	1	0
Grêmio	2018	Série A	1	0	1 (Note: Appearances in the Campeonato Gaúcho)	0	1 (Note: Appearances in the Copa do Brasil)	0	0	0	0	0	3	0
Grêmio	2019	Série A	0	0	2	0	1	0	0	0	0	0	3	0
Grêmio	Total		2	0	3	0	2	0	0	0	0	0	7	0
Ponte Preta (loan)	2019	Série B	13	3	0	0	0	0	–		0	0	13	3
Vitória	2020	Série B	0	0	0	0	3	2	–		5 (Note: Appearances in the Copa do Nordeste)	1	8	3
Career total			15	3	3	0	5	2	0	0	5	1	28	6
