= Bernard Doumbia =

Ivorian footballer

Personal information
- Full name: Bernard Henry Cédric Doumbia
- Date of birth: 11 November 1992 (age 34)
- Place of birth: Duékoué, Ivory Coast
- Height: 1.80 m (5 ft 11 in)
- Position: Forward

Team information
- Current team: Persis Solo
- Number: 11

Senior career*
Years	Team	Apps	(Gls)
2015	Saraburi	20	(3)
2016–2017	Angthong		
2017–2018	Chainat Hornbill	34	(15)
2018–2019	Nakhon Ratchasima	28	(12)
2020–2021	Al-Arabi SC		
2021–2022	Al-Fahaheel		
2022–2023	Qadsia SC		
2023	Khaitan		
2023–2024	Al-Wehdat		
2024–2025	Emirates Club	13	(2)
2025	Al-Ittihad Almisraty	6	(0)
2025	PDRM	7	(4)
2026	Bhayangkara Presisi	17	(8)
2026–	Persis Solo	7	(7)
- * Club domestic league appearances and goals as of 24 October 2026

Bernard Henry Cédric Doumbia (born 11 November 1992) is an Ivorian professional footballer who plays as a forward for Championship club Persis Solo.

== Club career ==
=== Bhayangkara Presisi ===
On 9 January 2026, Indonesian Super League club Bhayangkara Presisi announced the signing of Doumbia.

=== Persis Solo ===
On 2 August 2026, Doumbia officially completed a transfer to Championship club Persis Solo.
