= Hamdi Sula =

Indonesian footballer

Personal information
- Full name: Hamdi Sula Umanailo
- Date of birth: 3 November 1997 (age 29)
- Place of birth: North Halmahera, Indonesia
- Height: 1.70 m (5 ft 7 in)
- Position: Right back

Team information
- Current team: Deltras
- Number: 23

Senior career*
Years	Team	Apps	(Gls)
2017–2018	Perse Ende	10	(0)
2019–2020	Persekat Tegal	25	(1)
2020–2022	PSMS Medan	17	(0)
2023–2024	Arema	8	(0)
2023–2024	→ PSMS Medan (loan)	7	(0)
2024–2025	Persekat Tegal	22	(3)
2025	Semen Padang	2	(0)
2026	Persekat Tegal	10	(2)
2026–	Deltras	0	(0)
- * Club domestic league appearances and goals as of 8 May 2026

Hamdi Sula Umanailo (born 3 November 1997) is an Indonesian professional footballer who plays as a right back for Championship club Deltras.

== Club career ==
Sula started his career by joining Liga 3 club Perse Ende. He played for 2 season for Perse Ende. He then joined Persekat Tegal in 2019 season, and successfully brought Persekat Tegal promoted to Liga 2 next season.

=== PSMS Medan ===
In 2020, Sula signed a contract with PSMS Medan for a free transfer. Sula made his league debut on 7 October 2021 in a match against KS Tiga Naga at the Gelora Sriwijaya Stadium. On 11 October 2021, He marked his first win with PSMS in 2021–22 Liga 2 in a 0–1 away win over Muba Babel United. He made 12 league appearances, for PSMS Medan during the 2021–22 season, without scoring. In his second season at PSMS, Sula only made five appearances, because Liga 2 was suspended due to a tragedy.

=== Arema ===
Sula was signed for Arema to play in Liga 1 in the 2023–24 season. He made his debut on 2 July 2023 in a match against Dewa United at the Indomilk Arena, Tangerang.
