= Oktafianus Fernando =

Indonesian association football player

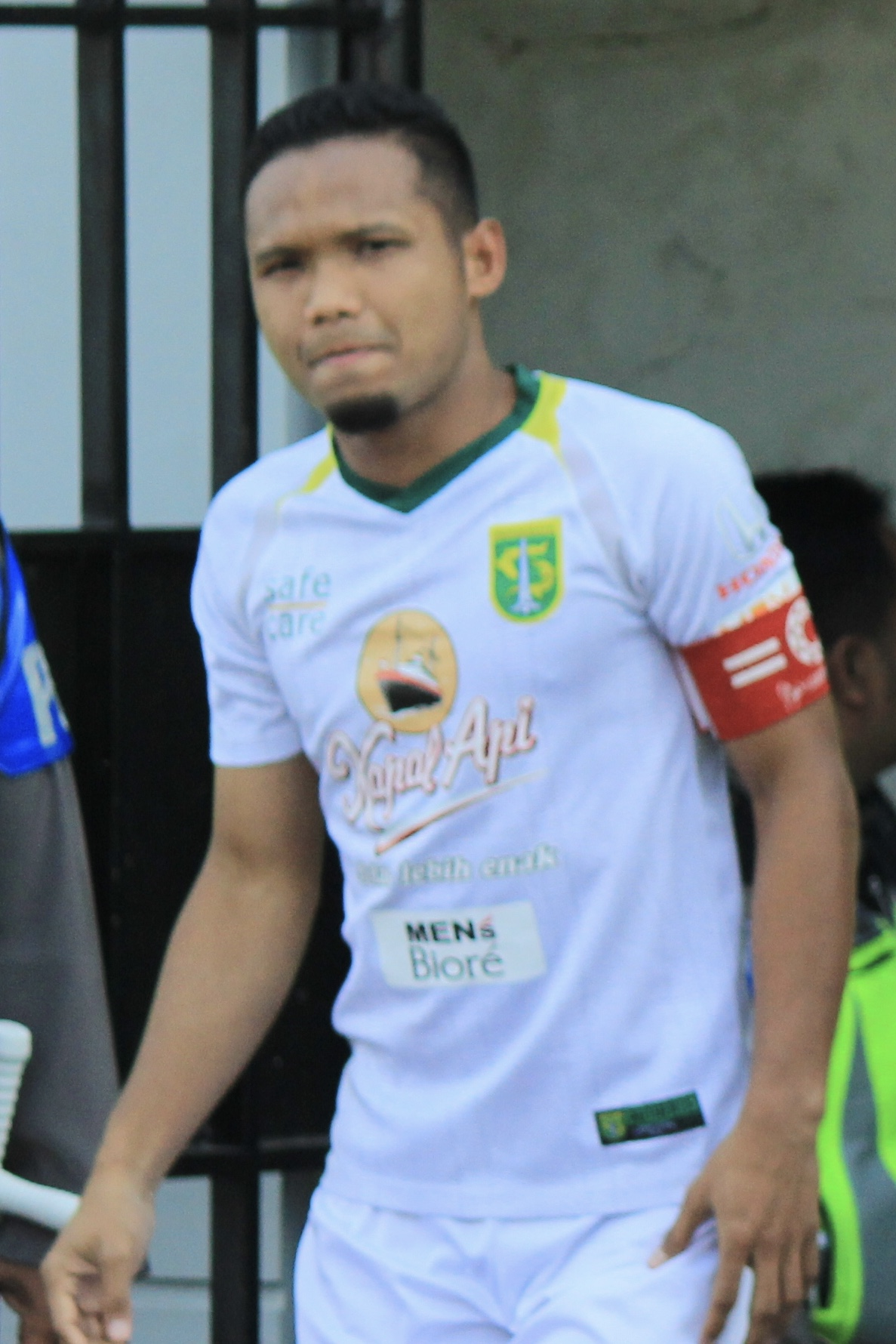
- Oktafianus playing for Persebaya in 2018

Personal information
- Full name: Oktafianus Fernando
- Date of birth: 4 October 1993 (age 33)
- Place of birth: Jakarta, Indonesia
- Height: 1.68 m (5 ft 6 in)
- Position: Winger

Team information
- Current team: Persis Solo
- Number: 99

Youth career
- Indonesia Muda
- 2014–2015: Persebaya Surabaya

Senior career*
Years	Team	Apps	(Gls)
2016	Persita Tangerang	15	(0)
2017–2022	Persebaya Surabaya	69	(9)
2022–2023	PSIS Semarang	23	(0)
2023	Persipal Palu	6	(1)
2023–2026	Persebaya Surabaya	20	(0)
2026–	Persis Solo	2	(0)
- * Club domestic league appearances and goals as of 11 October 2026

Oktafianus Fernando (born 4 October 1993), is an Indonesian professional footballer who plays as a winger for Championship club Persis Solo. He is the older brother of Marselino Ferdinan.

== Career statistics ==
=== Club ===
As of 11 October 2026

Club	Season	League			Cup (Note: Includes Piala Indonesia)		Other (Note: Appearances in Indonesia President's Cup)		Total	
Club	Season	Division	Apps	Goals	Apps	Goals	Apps	Goals	Apps	Goals
Persita Tangerang	2016	ISC B	15	0	0	0	0	0	15	0
Persita Tangerang	Total		15	0	0	0	0	0	15	0
Persebaya Surabaya	2017	Liga 2	20	5	0	0	0	0	17	5
Persebaya Surabaya	2018	Liga 1	26	1	0	0	4	0	30	1
Persebaya Surabaya	2019	Liga 1	20	3	4	0	5	0	29	3
Persebaya Surabaya	2020	Liga 1	2	0	0	0	0	0	2	0
Persebaya Surabaya	2021–22	Liga 1	4	0	0	0	4 (Note: Appearances in Menpora Cup)	0	8	0
Persebaya Surabaya	Total		69	9	4	0	13	0	86	9
PSIS Semarang	2022–23	Liga 1	23	0	0	0	6	1	29	1
Persipal Palu	2023–24	Liga 2	6	1	0	0	0	0	6	1
Persebaya Surabaya	2023–24	Liga 1	9	0	0	0	0	0	9	0
Persebaya Surabaya	2024–25	Liga 1	8	0	0	0	0	0	8	0
Persebaya Surabaya	2025–26	Super League	3	0	0	0	0	0	3	0
Persis Solo	2026–27	Championship	2	0	0	0	0	0	2	0
Career total			135	10	4	0	19	1	158	11

== Honours ==
Persebaya Surabaya

- Liga 2: 2017
- Liga 1 runner-up: 2019
- Indonesia President's Cup runner-up: 2019
- East Java Governor Cup: 2020
