= Samuel Balinsa =

Indonesian footballer (born 1999)

Personal information
- Full name: Samuel Gideon Balinsa
- Date of birth: 8 March 1999 (age 27)
- Place of birth: Sorong, Indonesia
- Height: 1.80 m (5 ft 11 in)
- Position: Midfielder

Team information
- Current team: Persis Solo
- Number: 41

Youth career
- SSB Bola Mania
- 2017–2018: Persipura U19
- 2019: PPLP Papua
- 2021: PON Papua

Senior career*
| Years | Team | Apps | (Gls) |
| 2019 | Persewar Waropen | 7 | (2) |
| 2022–2023 | Persewar Waropen | 6 | (0) |
| 2023–2026 | Arema | 59 | (0) |
| 2026– | Persis Solo | 5 | (0) |
- * Club domestic league appearances and goals as of 11 October 2026

Samuel Gideon Balinsa (born 8 March 1999) is an Indonesian professional footballer who plays as a midfielder for Championship club Persis Solo.

== Club career ==
Born in Sorong, Southwest Papua, Indonesia, Balinsa started his early career by playing for Bola Mania Soccer School and Persipura Jayapura U18.

=== Persewar Waropen ===
In 2019, he was signed for Persewar Waropen to play in Liga 2 in the 2019 season. Balinsa made his first-team debut on 22 June 2019 in a 0–1 win against Persatu Tuban. On 14 July 2019, Balinsa scored his first league goal for Persewar Waropen with scored a brace against Persik Kediri in a 0–2 win, the latter result saw Persewar move to 1st position in the league table of East Group. Balinsa finished the first season with 2 goals in 7 games.

=== Return to Persewar Waropen ===
After last season without a club and playing for Papua in the 2021 Pekan Olahraga Nasional, the following season, he rejoined Persewar Waropen. On 29 August 2022, he started his match in the 2022–23 season for Persewar in a 3–1 lose over Deltras. He finished his season in 2022–23 with only 6 appearances.

== Others ==
In 2019, He became part of the PPLP Papua team. In 2021, Balinsa participated in the 2021 Pekan Olahraga Nasional, representing Papua. He successfully represented Papua to win the gold medal after winning the final match in a 2–0 victory over the team from Aceh. After impressively representing Papua at the 2021 Pekan Olahraga Nasional, in January 2022, he almost joined Thai League 2 club Lampang, but that fell through due to administrative issues.

== Career statistics ==
=== Club ===
As of 11 October 2026

| Club | Season | League | | | Cup | | Continental | | Other | | Total | |
| Club | Season | Division | Apps | Goals | Apps | Goals | Apps | Goals | Apps | Goals | Apps | Goals |
|---|---|---|---|---|---|---|---|---|---|---|---|---|
| Persewar Waropen | 2019 | Liga 2 | 7 | 2 | 0 | 0 | – | | 0 | 0 | 7 | 2 |
| Persewar Waropen | 2022–23 | Liga 2 | 6 | 0 | 0 | 0 | – | | 0 | 0 | 6 | 0 |
| Arema | 2023–24 | Liga 1 | 16 | 0 | 0 | 0 | – | | 0 | 0 | 16 | 0 |
| Arema | 2024–25 | Liga 1 | 24 | 0 | 0 | 0 | – | | 4 (Note: Appearance(s) in Piala Presiden) | 0 | 28 | 0 |
| Arema | 2025–26 | Super League | 19 | 0 | 0 | 0 | – | | 1 | 0 | 20 | 0 |
| Arema | Total | | 59 | 0 | 0 | 0 | — | | 5 | 0 | 64 | 0 |
| Persis Solo | 2026–27 | Championship | 5 | 0 | 0 | 0 | – | | 0 | 0 | 5 | 0 |
| Career total | | | 77 | 2 | 0 | 0 | 0 | 0 | 5 | 0 | 82 | 2 |

== Honours ==
Arema

- Piala Presiden: 2024
