= Asyraq Gufron =

Indonesian association football player

Personal information
- Full name: Asyraq Gufron Ramadhan
- Date of birth: 19 February 1996 (age 30)
- Place of birth: Surabaya, Indonesia
- Height: 1.75 m (5 ft 9 in)
- Position: Centre back

Team information
- Current team: PSMS Medan
- Number: 55

Youth career
- 2016–2017: Bhayangkara

Senior career*
Years	Team	Apps	(Gls)
2016	PS Mojokerto Putra	8	(0)
2017–2018	Persis Solo	33	(0)
2018–2022	PSS Sleman	64	(1)
2022–2023	Bhayangkara	7	(0)
2023–2024	Arema	3	(0)
2023–2024	→ Persikab Bandung (loan)	5	(1)
2024–2025	PSIM Yogyakarta	4	(0)
2026	Semen Padang	10	(0)
2026–	PSMS Medan	1	(0)
- * Club domestic league appearances and goals as of 13 September 2026

Asyraq Gufron Ramadhan (born 19 February 1996), is an Indonesian professional footballer who plays as a centre back for Championship club PSMS Medan.

== Honours ==
=== Club ===
PSS Sleman

- Liga 2: 2018
- Menpora Cup third place: 2021

PSIM Yogyakarta

- Liga 2: 2024–25
