= Saldi Amiruddin =

Indonesian footballer

Personal information
- Full name: Saldi Amiruddin
- Date of birth: 9 March 1995 (age 31)
- Place of birth: Bantaeng, South Sulawesi, Indonesia
- Height: 1.70 m (5 ft 7 in)
- Positions: Winger; forward

Team information
- Current team: Persis Solo
- Number: 18

Youth career
- 2016: PON South Sulawesi
- 2017: PSM Makassar

Senior career*
Years	Team	Apps	(Gls)
2017	Madura United	13	(0)
2018–2022	PSM Makassar	30	(2)
2019	→ PSIM Yogyakarta (loan)	9	(1)
2022–2024	Bekasi City	24	(8)
2024–2025	PSIM Yogyakarta	16	(1)
2025–2026	Bekasi City	25	(5)
2026–	Persis Solo	3	(0)
- * Club domestic league appearances and goals as of 3 October 2026

Saldi Amiruddin (born 9 March 1995), known mononymously as Saldi, is an Indonesian professional footballer who plays as a winger or forward for Championship club Persis Solo.

== Club career ==
=== Madura United ===
He started playing professionally with Liga 1 club Madura United in 2017. Saldi made his league debut on 16 April 2017 in a match against Bali United at the Gelora Ratu Pamelingan Stadium, Pamekasan.

=== PSM Makassar ===
He transferred to PSM Makassar in 2018 to play in Liga 1. Saldi made his debut on 23 May 2018 in a match against Persib Bandung. On 23 September 2018, Saldi scored his first goal for PSM against Sriwijaya in the 21st minute at the Andi Mattalatta Stadium, Makassar.

==== PSIM Yogyakarta (loan) ====
He was signed for PSIM Yogyakarta to play in the Liga 2 in the 2019 season, on loan from PSM Makassar.

=== Bekasi City ===
On 6 June 2022, it was announced that Saldi would be joining Bekasi City for the 2022-23 Liga 2 campaign.

== Career statistics ==
=== Club ===
As of match played 3 October 2026

Appearances and goals by club, season and competition
Club	Season	League			Cup (Note: Includes Piala Indonesia)		Continental		Other (Note: Appearances in Indonesia President's Cup)		Total	
Club	Season	Division	Apps	Goals	Apps	Goals	Apps	Goals	Apps	Goals	Apps	Goals
Madura United	2017	Liga 1	13	0	0	0	–		0	0	13	0
PSM Makassar	2018	Liga 1	14	1	0	0	–		2	0	16	1
PSM Makassar	2019	Liga 1	2	0	1	0	3 (Note: Appearances in AFC Cup)	1	2	0	8	1
PSM Makassar	2020	Liga 1	0	0	0	0	–		0	0	0	0
PSM Makassar	2021	Liga 1	14	1	0	0	–		7 (Note: Appearances in Menpora Cup)	1	21	2
PSM Makassar	2022–23	Liga 1	0	0	0	0	0	0	0	0	0	0
PSM Makassar	Total		30	2	1	0	3	1	11	1	45	4
PSIM Yogyakarta (loan)	2019	Liga 2	9	1	0	0	–		0	0	9	1
Bekasi City	2022–23	Liga 2	7	2	0	0	–		0	0	7	2
Bekasi City	2023–24	Liga 2	17	6	0	0	–		0	0	17	6
Bekasi City	Total		24	8	0	0	0	0	0	0	24	8
PSIM Yogyakarta	2024–25	Liga 2	16	1	0	0	–		0	0	16	1
Bekasi City	2025–26	Liga 2	25	5	0	0	–		0	0	25	5
Persis Solo	2026–27	Championship	3	0	0	0	–		0	0	3	0
Career total			120	17	1	0	3	1	11	1	135	19

== Honours ==
PSIM Yogyakarta

- Liga 2: 2024–25
