= Marckho Sandy =

Indonesian footballer (born 1994)

Marckho Sandy Meraudje
Personal information
- Full name: Marckho Sandy Meraudje
- Date of birth: 4 December 1994 (age 31)
- Place of birth: Jayapura, Indonesia
- Height: 1.78 m (5 ft 10 in)
- Position: Right-back

Team information
- Current team: Deltras
- Number: 26

Youth career
- 2016–2017: Persipura Jayapura

Senior career*
Years	Team	Apps	(Gls)
2017–2018	Sriwijaya	57	(4)
2019–2021	Madura United	30	(0)
2021–2022	Borneo Samarinda	19	(0)
2022–2023	PSS Sleman	23	(0)
2023–2024	RANS Nusantara	25	(0)
2024–2025	PSBS Biak	29	(1)
2025–2026	Persipura Jayapura	20	(0)
2026–	Deltras	1	(0)

International career
2021	Indonesia	1	(0)
Medal record
Men's football
Representing Indonesia
AFF Championship
Runner-up	2020 Singapore	Team
- * Club domestic league appearances and goals as of 13 September 2026

Marckho Sandy Meraudje (born 4 December 1994) is an Indonesian professional footballer who plays as a right-back for Championship club Deltras.

== Club career ==
=== Sriwijaya ===
In 2017, Merauje signed a year contract with Sriwijaya. He made his debut on 3 May 2017 in a match against Bhayangkara. On 26 September 2017, Merauje scored his first goal for Sriwijaya against Persela Lamongan in the 47th minute at the Bumi Sriwijaya Stadium, Palembang.

=== Madura United ===
He was signed for Madura United to play in Liga 1 in the 2019 season. Marckho made his league debut on 17 May 2019 in a match against Persela Lamongan at the Surajaya Stadium, Lamongan. In two seasons with Madura United, Merauje made 30 league appearances.

=== Borneo Samarinda ===
In 2021, Marckho signed a contract with Indonesian Liga 1 club Borneo Samarinda. Marckho made his league debut on 4 September 2021 in a match against Persebaya Surabaya at the Wibawa Mukti Stadium, Cikarang.

=== PSS Sleman ===
Meraudje was signed for PSS Sleman to play in Liga 1 in the 2022–23 season. He made his league debut on 29 July 2022 in a match against RANS Nusantara at the Pakansari Stadium, Cibinong.

=== RANS Nusantara ===
Marckho was signed for RANS Nusantara to play in Liga 1 in the 2023–24 season. He made his debut on 3 July 2023 in a match against Persikabo 1973 at the Maguwoharjo Stadium, Sleman.

== International career ==
In November 2021, Indonesian coach, Shin Tae-yong sent Marckho his first call up to the full national side replace Vava Mario Yagalo, for the friendly matches against Afghanistan and Myanmar in Turkey. He made his official international debut on 25 November 2021, against Myanmar in a friendly match in Antalya.

== Career statistics ==
=== Club ===
As of match played 13 September 2026

Club	Season	League			Cup (Note: Includes Piala Indonesia)		Continental		Other (Note: Appearances in Indonesia President's Cup)		Total	
Club	Season	Division	Apps	Goals	Apps	Goals	Apps	Goals	Apps	Goals	Apps	Goals
Sriwijaya	2017	Liga 1	27	2	0	0	–		4	0	31	2
Sriwijaya	2018	Liga 1	30	2	0	0	–		6	0	36	2
Sriwijaya	Total		57	4	0	0	–		10	0	67	4
Madura United	2019	Liga 1	27	0	5	0	–		6	0	32	0
Madura United	2020	Liga 1	3	0	0	0	–		0	0	3	0
Madura United	2021–22	Liga 1	0	0	0	0	–		3 (Note: Appearances in Menpora Cup)	0	3	0
Madura United	Total		30	0	5	0	–		9	0	44	0
Borneo	2021–22	Liga 1	19	0	0	0	–		0	0	19	0
PSS Sleman	2022–23	Liga 1	23	0	0	0	–		7	0	30	0
RANS Nusantara	2023–24	Liga 1	25	0	0	0	–		0	0	25	0
PSBS Biak	2024–25	Liga 1	29	1	0	0	–		0	0	29	1
PSBS Biak	2024–25	Liga 1	29	1	0	0	–		0	0	29	1
Persipura Jayapura	2025–26	Championship	20	0	0	0	–		0	0	20	0
Deltras	2026–27	Championship	1	0	0	0	–		0	0	1	0
Career total			204	5	5	0	0	0	26	0	235	5

=== International ===
As of match played 25 November 2021

Appearances and goals by national team and year
National team	Year	Apps	Goals
Indonesia	2021	1	0
Total		1	0

== Honours ==
=== Club ===
Sriwijaya

- East Kalimantan Governor Cup: 2018

=== International ===
Indonesia

- AFF Championship runner-up: 2020
