= Ariel Lucero =

Argentine professional footballer

Personal information
- Full name: Pablo Ángel Ariel Lucero
- Date of birth: 16 April 1999 (age 27)
- Place of birth: Buenos Aires, Argentina
- Height: 1.70 m (5 ft 7 in)
- Position: Attacking midfielder

Team information
- Current team: Olimpo

Youth career
- All Boys

Senior career*
Years	Team	Apps	(Gls)
2018–2023	All Boys	45	(2)
2022	→ Almirante Brown (loan)	0	(0)
2022	→ Budućnost Podgorica (loan)	15	(2)
2023–2024	Arema	26	(0)
2025–	Olimpo	1	(0)
- * Club domestic league appearances and goals as of 16:31, 21 June 2025 (UTC)

Pablo Ángel Ariel Lucero (born 16 April 1999) is an Argentine professional footballer who plays as an attacking midfielder for Olimpo.

== Career ==
All Boys gave Lucero his beginning in senior football. Pablo De Muner chose him off the substitutes bench in Primera Nacional matches against Comunicaciones, Acassuso and Barracas Central from November 2018 in 2018–19. Lucero's first start came during a 1–1 draw at home to San Miguel on 25 January 2019. In January 2022, Lucero joined Almirante Brown on a one-year loan deal.
