= Julian Schwarzer =

Filipino footballer (born 1999)

Personal information
- Full name: Julian Schwarzer Garcia
- Date of birth: October 26, 1999 (age 27)
- Place of birth: Harrogate, England
- Height: 1.82 m (6 ft 0 in)
- Position: Goalkeeper

Youth career
- 2016–2018: Fulham

Senior career*
Years	Team	Apps	(Gls)
2018–2019	Pipinsried	0	(0)
2019	Harlow Town		
2019	Slough Town	0	(0)
2019–2020	Chipstead		
2020	Harrow Borough		
2020	Basingstoke Town	14	(0)
2020–2022	Fulham	0	(0)
2022	→ Kingstonian (loan)	1	(0)
2022–2023	Azkals Development Team	10	(0)
2023	Kuching City	5	(0)
2023–2024	Arema	26	(0)
2025	Newtown	9	(0)

International career
2022	Philippines	3	(0)
- * Club domestic league appearances and goals

Julian Schwarzer Garcia (born October 26, 1999) is a former professional footballer who played as a goalkeeper. Born in England, he represented the Philippines at international level.

== Early life ==
Schwarzer was born in Harrogate, England. His father, Mark Schwarzer, is a renowned goalkeeper of Australia who made more than 500 Premier League appearances and played at two FIFA World Cups, while his mother, Paloma García, migrated with her family from the Philippines to Australia. Paloma is the daughter of Arturo García, a former footballer who played for De La Salle University. She is also the grandniece of Albert M.G. García, a former Filipino international footballer in the 1960s.

== Club career ==
=== Fulham ===
In 2016, Schwarzer signed a two-year scholarship deal with Fulham and joined the U18 squad. In his first season with the U18 team, he failed to make a single appearance. He made his debut for Fulham U18 the next season in a 2–2 draw against Norwich City U18.

In February 2018, Schwarzer was called up to the first team as the third goalkeeper in their match against Bolton Wanderers in the EFL Championship.

Schwarzer was released in the summer of 2018 after failing to secure a new contract.

=== Germany ===
A couple of months later, Schwarzer went overseas and joined Regionalliga Bayern club Pipinsried.

=== Returned to train with Fulham ===
After as short stint in Germany, Schwarzer returned to England to train with Fulham FC U23s.

In October 2019, Schwarzer joined Isthmian League club Chipstead. He made his debut for the club in a 1–1 draw against Tooting & Mitcham United in the Alan Turvey Trophy.

In August 2020, Schwarzer signed a short-term deal with Isthmian League club Basingstoke Town.

=== Return to Fulham ===
Schwarzer re-signed for Fulham as a backup goalkeeper for the U23 squad, sitting on the bench for several of their league matches.

In March 2022, Schwarzer was sent out on loan to Kingstonian until the end of the 2021–22 season.

In May 2022, Schwarzer was once again, released by the club.

=== Azkals Development Team ===
Schwarzer joined Philippines Football League club Azkals Development Team. He made his debut for ADT in a 0–1 defeat against Kaya–Iloilo.

=== Kuching City ===
On January 11, 2023, Schwarzer signed for Super League club Kuching for 2023–24 season.

=== Arema ===
On July 20, 2023, Schwarzer signed for Liga 1 club Arema for 2023–24 season.

=== Newtown ===
On January 15, 2025, it was announced that Schwarzer had signed for Newtown AFC in the Cymru Premier League as their first choice goalkeeper for phase two of the 2024–25 season.

== International career ==
Schwarzer was eligible to represent England (his birthplace), Germany (through his father's side), and Philippines (through his mother).

Schwarzer was considered for playing for the Philippines in the U23 national team for the 2019 and 2021 Southeast Asian Games, but was unable to secure a Philippine passport. He made his debut for the Philippines national team in a 4–1 friendly win against Timor Leste in Indonesia, coming on as a second-half substitute.
