= Rizky Yusuf Nasution =

Indonesian association football player

Personal information
- Full name: Muhammad Rizky Yusuf Nasution
- Date of birth: 16 July 1997 (age 29)
- Place of birth: Aceh Timur, Indonesia
- Height: 1.67 m (5 ft 6 in)
- Position: Midfielder

Team information
- Current team: Persis Solo
- Number: 25

Senior career*
Years	Team	Apps	(Gls)
2016	Persiraja Banda Aceh	6	(0)
2017	Borneo	5	(0)
2017	PSBL Langsa	6	(0)
2018	Persika Karawang	11	(0)
2018–2019	Persiraja Banda Aceh	12	(0)
2020	Persijap Jepara	0	(0)
2022	Persiraja Banda Aceh	14	(0)
2022	Putra Delta Sidoarjo	4	(0)
2023–2025	Persiraja Banda Aceh	38	(1)
2025–2026	Bekasi City	14	(0)
2026–	Persis Solo	2	(0)
- * Club domestic league appearances and goals as of 26 September 2026

Muhammad Rizky Yusuf Nasution (born 16 July 1997) is an Indonesian professional footballer who plays as a midfielder for Persis Solo. A product of Persiraja youth system in 2016, he rejoined Persiraja from Persika during 2018 mid season transfer windows in August 2018. In 2017, he played for Borneo in Liga 1.

== Club career ==
=== Persijap Jepara ===
Nasution signed with Persijap Jepara to play in the Indonesian Liga 2 for the 2020 season. This season was suspended on 27 March 2020 due to the COVID-19 pandemic. The season was abandoned and was declared void on 20 January 2021.

=== Persiraja Banda Aceh ===
He was signed for Persiraja Banda Aceh to play in the Liga 1 in the 2021 season. Nasution made his league debut on 7 January 2022 in a match against PSS Sleman at the Ngurah Rai Stadium, Denpasar.

== Controversy ==
In the away match against PSPS Pekanbaru on 11 February 2025 at Kaharudin Nasution Stadium. Rizky, who at that time happened to be the Persiraja captain, did not accept the referee's decision and tried to strangle and provoke his friends to hit the referee's head by holding the neck and holding the body, fortunately at that time there were military police and the fourth referee. The referee on duty at that time was Amri Nurhadi who is the referee of the highest caste league in Indonesia BRI Liga 1.
