= Ichaka Diarra =

Malian footballer (born 1995)

Personal information
- Full name: Ichaka Diarra
- Date of birth: 18 January 1995 (age 31)
- Place of birth: Bamako, Mali
- Height: 1.91 m (6 ft 3 in)
- Position: Centre-back

Team information
- Current team: Al Ansar (on loan from Tadamon Sour)
- Number: 15

Senior career*
Years	Team	Apps	(Gls)
2012–2013	Onze Créateurs	21	(4)
2013–2014	Stade Malien	28	(3)
2014–2015	Djoliba	25	(6)
2015–2016	Espérance de Tunis	4	(0)
2016–2017	Speranța Nisporeni	3	(0)
2017–2018	Buildcon	38	(7)
2018–2019	ASC Jaraaf	0	(0)
2020	Al-Thoqbah	24	(1)
2020–2021	Al-Arabi	20	(1)
2021–2022	Sahab SC	0	(0)
2022–2023	Ansar	29	(2)
2023	Arema	10	(0)
2024	Ansar	5	(0)
2024	Al-Wehdat	3	(0)
2025	Jamus	0	(0)
2025–	Tadamon Sour	14	(2)
2026–	→ Al Ansar (loan)	0	(0)

International career^{‡}
2013–2015	Mali U20	19	(2)
2021	Mali	1	(0)
- * Club domestic league appearances and goals as of 8 March 2026 ‡ National team caps and goals as of 24 March 2021

Ichaka Diarra (born 18 January 1995) is a Malian professional footballer who plays as a centre-back for Lebanese Premier League club Al Ansar on loan from Tadamon Sour.

== Club career ==
Diarra signed for Ansar in the 2021–22 Lebanese Premier League, and renewed his contract in summer 2022 for one year.

He signed for Arema of Indonesian league first tier on 30 May 2023 for 2023–24 Liga 1 season.

== International career ==
Diarra made his debut for Mali on 24 March 2021 in an Africa Cup of Nations qualifier against Guinea.

== Honours ==
Ansar

- Lebanese FA Cup: 2023–24; runner-up: 2021–22
