= Riswan Lauhin =

Indonesian footballer

Personal information
- Full name: Riswan Hi Lauhin
- Date of birth: 8 August 1998 (age 28)
- Place of birth: Ternate, Indonesia
- Height: 1.75 m (5 ft 9 in)
- Position: Centre-back

Team information
- Current team: Persis Solo
- Number: 44

Youth career
- 2017: Porprov Halmahera Utara
- 2020–2021: PON Maluku Utara

Senior career*
Years	Team	Apps	(Gls)
2019	Persiter Ternate		
2020	Cilegon United	0	(0)
2022–2025	Persebaya Surabaya	55	(0)
2025–2026	Malut United	6	(0)
2026–	Persis Solo	0	(0)
- * Club domestic league appearances and goals as of 23 May 2026

Riswan Hi Lauhin (born 8 August 1998) is an Indonesian professional footballer who plays as a centre-back for Championship club Persis Solo.

== Club career ==
=== Persebaya Surabaya ===
He was signed for Persebaya Surabaya and played in Liga 1 in 2022–2023 season. Lauhin made his league debut on 25 July 2022 in a match against Persikabo 1973 at the Pakansari Stadium, Cibinong.
