= Syamsul Rifai =

Indonesian footballer (born 2006)

Personal information
- Full name: Muhammad Syamsul Rifai
- Date of birth: 10 August 2006 (age 20)
- Place of birth: Bogor, Indonesia
- Height: 1.65 m (5 ft 5 in)
- Position: Defensive midfielder

Team information
- Current team: Barito Putera
- Number: 66

Youth career
- SSB Cikeas Junior
- CIP Taruna 1987
- 2022: RANS Nusantara
- 2023: Persikabo 1973

Senior career*
Years	Team	Apps	(Gls)
2023–2025	Persikabo 1973	16	(0)
2025–2026	PSPS Pekanbaru	12	(0)
2026–	Barito Putera	3	(0)

International career^{‡}
2023	Indonesia U17	0	(0)
2024	Indonesia U20	1	(0)
- * Club domestic league appearances and goals as of 4 October 2026 ‡ National team caps and goals as of 30 January 2024

Muhammad Syamsul Rifai (born 10 August 2006) is an Indonesian professional footballer who plays as a defensive midfielder for Championship club Barito Putera.

== Early life ==
Rifai was born in Bogor Regency, West Java. He grew up in the district of Gunung Putri of the regency.

== Club career ==
=== Persikabo 1973 ===
Rifai began his professional career with Persikabo 1973, prior to that, he played for the Persikabo U20 team and earned a promotion to the senior team. He made his professional debut for Laskar Padjajaran on 13 August 2023, coming on as a starter in a 3–2 lost against Borneo Samarinda. During the 2023–24 season, he registered 4 league appearances and without scoring with Persikabo 1973.

Following the club's relegation, he will play in Liga 2 with Persikabo 1973 this upcoming season. On 6 October 2024, he started his match in the 2024–25 Liga 2 season for Persikabo 1973, playing as a starter in an away 5–1 loss over Sriwijaya. Rifai finished the 2024–25 season with 12 appearances.

=== PSPS Pekanbaru ===
On 25 July 2025, Rifai moved to Championship club PSPS Pekanbaru. He made his debut on 12 September 2025 in a match against Bekasi City, coming on as a starter in a 4–0 loss. He secured 12 league appearances throughout the 2025–26 season.

=== Barito Putera ===
On 27 July 2026, Championship club Barito Putera officially signed Rifai ahead of the 2026–27 season.

== International career ==
In September 2023, Rifai received a call-up from coach Bima Sakti to participate in the Indonesia U17 training camp in Germany in preparation for the 2023 FIFA U-17 World Cup.

Rifai made his international debut for Indonesia U20 on 30 January 2024, playing as a starter in a friendly match against Uzbekistan U20 at Gelora Bung Karno Madya Stadium, Jakarta.

== Career statistics ==
=== Club ===
As of 4 October 2026

Club	Season	League			Cup		Continental		Other		Total	
Club	Season	Division	Apps	Goals	Apps	Goals	Apps	Goals	Apps	Goals	Apps	Goals
Persikabo 1973	2023–24	Liga 1	4	0	—		—		—		4	0
Persikabo 1973	2024–25	Liga 2	12	0	—		—		—		12	0
Persikabo 1973	Total		16	0	—		—		—		16	0
PSPS Pekanbaru	2025–26	Championship	12	0	—		—		—		12	0
Barito Putera	2026–27	Championship	3	0	—		—		—		3	0
Career total			31	0	0	0	0	0	0	0	31	0
