= Saddam Gaffar =

Indonesian footballer (born 2001)

Personal information
- Full name: Saddam Emiruddin Gaffar
- Date of birth: 24 September 2001 (age 25)
- Place of birth: Jepara, Indonesia
- Height: 1.87 m (6 ft 2 in)
- Position: Striker

Team information
- Current team: Persis Solo
- Number: 9

Youth career
- 2017: Persiku Kudus
- 2018: PPLP Jawa Tengah
- 2019: PSS Sleman

Senior career*
Years	Team	Apps	(Gls)
2020–2024	PSS Sleman	19	(1)
2024–2025	Bekasi City	10	(3)
2026–	Persis Solo	0	(0)

International career
2019–2020	Indonesia U19	10	(2)
2021	Indonesia	1	(0)
Medal record
Men's football
Representing Indonesia
AFF U-19 Youth Championship
Third place	2019 Vietnam
- * Club domestic league appearances and goals as of 15 November 2024

Saddam Emiruddin Gaffar (born 24 September 2001) is an Indonesian professional footballer who plays as a striker for Championship club Persis Solo.

== Club career ==
=== PSS Sleman ===
Gaffar made his first-team debut for Sleman in the 2021 Menpora Cup, a pre-season tournament ahead of the 2021 Liga 1 season, in which he scored two goals.

== International career ==
Gaffar debuted for the Indonesia U-19 team in the 2019 AFF U-19 Youth Championship and scored his first goal in the U-19 squad when it faced Saudi Arabia U-19 in a friendly on 11 September 2020. He received a call up to the senior Indonesia national football team in May 2021.

He earned his first senior cap in a 25 May 2021 friendly match in Dubai against Afghanistan.

== Career statistics ==
=== Club ===
As of 15 November 2024

Appearances and goals by club, season and competition
Club	Season	League		Cup		Continental		Other		Total	
Club	Season	Apps	Goals	Apps	Goals	Apps	Goals	Apps	Goals	Apps	Goals
PSS Sleman	2020	0	0	0	0	0	0	0	0	0	0
PSS Sleman	2021–22	2	0	0	0	0	0	4 (Note: Appearances in Menpora Cup.)	2	6	2
PSS Sleman	2022–23	11	0	0	0	0	0	0	0	11	0
PSS Sleman	2023–24	6	1	0	0	0	0	0	0	6	1
Bekasi City	2024–25	10	3	0	0	0	0	0	0	10	3
Career total		29	4	0	0	0	0	4	2	33	6

=== International ===
As of match played 11 June 2021

Appearances and goals by national team and year
National team	Year	Apps	Goals
Indonesia	2021	1	0
Total		1	0

== Honours ==
PSS Sleman

- Menpora Cup third place: 2021

Indonesia U-19

- AFF U-19 Youth Championship third place: 2019
