= 2020 Liga 3 (Indonesia) =

Fourth season of the Liga 3 in Indonesia

Liga 3
- Season: 2020
- Dates: Qualifying: Cancelled; National round: Cancelled

The 2020 Liga 3 would be the fourth season of the Liga 3 under its current name, the fifth season under its current league structure, and the only amateur league football competition in Indonesia. It was cancelled due to the COVID-19 pandemic in Indonesia.

== Teams ==
=== Team changes ===
The following teams have changed division since the 2019 season.

==== To Liga 3 ====
Relegated from Liga 2

- PSGC
- Persibat
- Bandung United
- Madura
- Persatu
- PSMP

==== From Liga 3 ====
Promoted to Liga 2

- Persijap
- PSKC
- Tiga Naga
- Persekat
- Putra Sinar Giri
- Semeru

== Qualifying round ==
In contrast to last season, the teams that managed to advance to the second round in the previous season will start from their respective provincial round. First, each province held their provincial league followed by unlimited amateur teams with different competition format. Then qualified teams from provincial league will be competing in their respective region to earn 32 slots in national round.

=== Province round ===
These teams will be the representatives from their provincial league to be competing in regional round.

Sumatra Region
Province	Teams
Aceh
North Sumatra
Riau
Riau Islands	
West Sumatra
Jambi
Bengkulu	
(Bangka Belitung Islands) Bangka Belitung	
South Sumatra
Lampung

Kalimantan Region
Province	Teams
West Kalimantan
Central Kalimantan	
South Kalimantan	
East Kalimantan	
North Kalimantan	

Java Region
Province	Teams
Banten
Jakarta
West Java
Central Java
(Special Region of Yogyakarta) Yogyakarta
East Java

Lesser Sunda Islands Region
Province	Teams
Bali
West Nusa Tenggara
East Nusa Tenggara

Sulawesi Region
Province	Teams
Gorontalo	
North Sulawesi	
Central Sulawesi	
West Sulawesi	
Southeast Sulawesi	
South Sulawesi	

Maluku Region
Province	Teams
(Maluku (province)) Maluku	
North Maluku	

Papua Region
Province	Teams
(West Papua (province)) West Papua	
(Papua (province)) Papua	

Notes:

- BOLD: Winner of each provincial league.
- Grey background denotes provinces that did not held province round due to COVID-19 pandemic.

== See also ==
- 2020–21 Liga 1
- 2020–21 Liga 2
- 2020 Piala Indonesia
