= Deltras F.C. =

Association football club in Sidoarjo, Indonesia

Deltras
- Full name: Delta Raya Sidoarjo Football Club
- Nickname: The Lobsters
- Short name: DTS
- Founded: 1989; 37 years ago (as PS Gelora Dewata 89)
- Ground: Gelora Delta Stadium
- Capacity: 19,400
- Owner: PT Delta Raya Sidoarjo
- Chairman: Amir Burhannudin
- Coach: Leonard Tupamahu
- League: Championship
- 2025–26: 5th (2nd Group)
Home colours	Away colours

Delta Raya Sidoarjo Football Club or Deltras FC is an Indonesian professional football club based in Sidoarjo, East Java. They play in the Championship. The club's home stadium is the Gelora Delta Stadium.

== History ==
Founded in 1989 by a businessman named H.M. Mislan as PS Gelora Dewata 89 with home base in Bali, they moved to Sidoarjo in 2001 and changed their name to Gelora Putra Delta after playing some matches in the early 2001–2002 season. Some time later, still in 2001, the club renamed as Deltras, an acronym to Delta Putra Sidoarjo.

In 2003, the ownership status of the club changed from HM Mislan to the Government of Sidoarjo Regency, making Deltras another official football club of Sidoarjo after Persida Sidoarjo. In 2011, after the club's financial problem during the 2010–2011 season, the Government of Sidoarjo Regency established PT Delta Raya Sidoarjo, a limited liability firm owning Deltras Sidoarjo to fully professionalize the club's management.

The establishment of the firm in 2011 brought a great deal of change to the club. In late 2011, the club's management decided to change the club's name from Deltras Sidoarjo to Deltras Football Club. The term Putra in Deltra Putra Sidoarjo which means 'boys' was changed to Raya which means 'great'.

== Players ==
=== Current squad ===
As of September 2026

Note: Flags indicate national team as defined under FIFA eligibility rules; some limited exceptions apply. Players may hold more than one non-FIFA nationality.

No.	Pos.	Nation	Player
3	DF	IDN	Bagus Nirwanto
4	DF	IRI	Taher Jahanbakhsh
5	MF	IDN	Ichlasul Qadri
6	MF	IDN	Manda Cingi
8	MF	IDN	Ananta Krisna (on loan from Bali United)
9	FW	IDN	Muhammad Irman
10	FW	POR	Mohcine Nader
11	FW	IDN	Wigi Pratama
13	DF	IDN	Muhammad Idris
14	MF	IDN	Hariono
15	FW	IDN	Achmad Dwi
16	MF	IDN	Raditya Rahardjo
17	DF	IDN	Marsel Usemahu
18	FW	IDN	Martinus Novianto
19	MF	IDN	Rizky Pellu
20	FW	IDN	Aulia Rahman
21	GK	IDN	Havizd Muzaki
22	MF	IDN	Ichsan Pratama
23	DF	IDN	Hamdi Sula

No.	Pos.	Nation	Player
25	MF	IDN	I Ketut Dedi
26	DF	IDN	Marckho Sandy
27	FW	IDN	Rafly Juniar
28	MF	IDN	Gading Kritanto
29	GK	IDN	Samuel Reimas
30	FW	IDN	Nathan Ari (on loan from Bali United)
31	DF	IDN	Christian Deo
32	FW	IDN	Aqil Agustian
33	GK	IDN	Abdul Rohim
35	DF	IDN	Reza Wili Saputra
45	DF	IDN	Dani Ibrohim (on loan from Persija Jakarta)
77	FW	BRA	Rian Lopes
81	GK	IDN	Rafi Ardiono
87	MF	IDN	Shulton Fajar

=== Other players under contract ===
Note: Flags indicate national team as defined under FIFA eligibility rules; some limited exceptions apply. Players may hold more than one non-FIFA nationality.

No.	Pos.	Nation	Player
—	MF	IDN	Faizal Maulana
—	FW	IDN	Flabio Soares

== Coaching staff ==
Position	Name	Nationality
Head coach	Leonard Tupamahu	Indonesia
Assistant coach	Nurul Huda	Indonesia
Assistant coach	Muhammad Kusen	Indonesia
Goalkeeping coach	Agung Prasetyo	Indonesia
Fitness coach	Muh Akmal Almy, M.Or	Indonesia

== Management ==
Office	Name
Chairman	Amir Burhannudin

== Honours ==
Cup

- Piala Galatama
  - Winners (1): 1994

== Season-by-season records ==
=== As Gelora Dewata ===
Season	League/Division	Tms.	Pos.	Piala Indonesia	AFC competition(s)	
1994–95	Premier Division	34	5 in West Div.	Champions	Asian winners cup	Second round
1995–96	Premier Division	31	Second round	–	–	–
1996–97	Premier Division	33	Second round	–	–	–
1997–98	Premier Division	31	did not finish	–	–	–
1998–99	Premier Division	28	5 in Central Div. (PO Winners)	–	–	–
1999–2000	Premier Division	28	12 in East Div.	–	–	–

=== As Deltras Sidoarjo ===
Season	League/Division	Tms.	Pos.	Piala Indonesia	I-League Cup	AFC competition(s)	
2001	Premier Division	28	9 in East Div.	–	–	–	–
2002	Premier Division	24	5 in East Div.	–	–	–	–
2003	Premier Division	20	12	–	–	–	–
2004	Premier Division	18	18	–	–	–	–
2005	Premier Division	28	13 in West Div. (PO Winners)	Second round	–	–	–
2006	Premier Division	28	12 in East Div.	Quarter-finals	–	–	–
2007–08	Premier Division	36	Second round	Quarter-finals	–	–	–
2008–09	Super League	18	16	3rd Place	–	–	–
2009–10	Premier Division	33	2	Group stage	–	–	–
2010–11	Super League	18	13	–	–	–	–
2011–12	Super League	18	17	did not participated	–	–	–
2013	Premier Division	39	4 in Group 3	–	–	–	–
2014	Premier Division	60	8 in Group 6	–	–	–	–
2015	Liga Nusantara	≤100	did not finish	–	–	–	–
2016	Indonesian Soccer Championship C	≤100	Qualifying round East Java Provinces	–	–	–	–
2017	Liga 3	≤100	Round of 16; National round	–	–	–	–
2018	Liga 3	≤100	Qualifying round East Java Provinces	First round	–	–	–
2019	Liga 3	≤100	Qualifying round East Java Provinces	First round	–	–	–
2020	Liga 3	≤100	did not finish	–	–	–	–
2021–22	Liga 3	≤100	Round of 16; National Round (Promoted)	–	–	–	–
2022–23	Liga 2	28	did not finish	–	–	–	–
2023–24	Liga 2	28	2nd in Championship round	–	–	–	–
2024–25	Liga 2	26	4th in Championship round	–	–	–	–
2025–26	Championship	20	5th, Group 2	–	–	–	–
2026–27	Championship	20	TBD	–	TBD	–	–

Key

- Tms. = Number of teams
- Pos. = Position in league

== Performance in AFC competitions ==
- Asian Cup Winners' Cup: 1 appearance

1994–95: Second round

Season	Competition	Round	Nat	Club	Home	Away
1994–95	Asian Cup Winners' Cup	First round		bye	–	–
1994–95	Asian Cup Winners' Cup	Second round^{1}	(Malaysia)	Kuala Lumpur	2–0	2–1

^{1} Gelora Dewata disqualified due to fielding two ineligible players

== Asian club ranking ==
As of 26 April 2026.

Current Rank	Country	Team
311	(Indonesia)	Deltras
312	(Iran)	Naft Masjed Soleyman
313	(Indonesia)	Persijap
314	(Jordan)	Mansheyat Bani Hasan
315	(Indonesia)	PSMS

== Supporters ==
Deltras supporters are referred to as Deltamania.

== Affiliated clubs ==
- (Chinese Taipei) Tainan City
