= Persis Solo =

Association football team in Indonesia

- Full name: Persatuan Sepakbola Indonesia Soerakarta
- Nicknames: Laskar Sambernyawa (The Grim Reapers); Alap-Alap Kawah Jawa (Peregrine Falcon)
- Short name: PSO
- Founded: 8 November 1923; 102 years ago; (as Vorstenlandsche Voetbal Bond); 1935; 91 years ago (as PERSIS)
- Ground: Manahan Stadium
- Capacity: 20,000
- Owner: PT Persis Solo Saestu
- President: Kaesang Pangarep
- Manager: Yahya Alkatiri
- Coach: Ricky Nelson
- League: Championship
- 2025–26: Super League, 16th of 18 (relegated)
- Website: www.persissolo.id
Home colours	Away colours

Persatuan Sepakbola Indonesia Surakarta (lit. 'Indonesian Football Association of Surakarta'), commonly known as Persis Solo, is an Indonesian football club based in the Central Java city of Surakarta. Founded on 8 November 1923 as Vorstenlandschen Voetbal Bond (English: Royal Football Union; abbreviated as VVB), it was officially renamed to its current brand in 1935. They will compete in the Championship next season, following relegation from the 2025–26 Super League.

Persis returned to top-flight football after a decade in 2022 following its success in winning the 2021 Liga 2 title. The club plays its Super League home games at Manahan Stadium, which has a capacity of 20,000 spectators. The 2021 revival of the club was driven by its new, politically connected owners – Kaesang Pangarep, the youngest son of President Joko Widodo who acts as the club's chairman, and State-Owned Enterprises Minister Erick Thohir.

== History ==
Persis Solo was established on 8 November 1923, Sastrosaksono from the M.A.R.S club and Raden Ngabehi Reksohadiprojo and Sutarman from the Romeo club initiated the formation of the Vorstenlandsche Voetbal Bond (VVB) as the forerunner of a football club that is the pride of the people of Solo. It is based on the belief of the three figures that the game of football can be played by anyone without any certain limitations.

On 28 October 1928, VVB reacted to the moment of the Youth Pledge of 1928, since 12 May 1933 then VVB changed its name to Persatuan Sepakraga Indonesia Soerakarta (Persis). This name change is a form of appreciation for the values of struggle and unity contained in the contents of the youth oath. Informally, the name Persis began to be used by the club.

On 19 April 1930, they participated in the founding of the Indonesian football federation called PSSI (In Indonesian: Persatuan Sepakbola Seluruh Indonesia) with six clubs, Bandoengsche Inlandsche Voetbal Bond (Persib Bandung), Indonesische Voetbal Bond Magelang (PPSM Magelang), Madioensche Voetbal Bond (PSM Madiun), Persatuan Sepakraga Mataram (PSIM Yogyakarta), Soerabajasche Indonesische Voetbal Bond (Persebaya Surabaya), and Voetbalbond Indonesische Jacarta (Persija Jakarta). The establishment of PSSI came from the spirit of the Indonesian people's struggle against Dutch imperialism at that time, and on 12 May 1933, Persis began to be inaugurated by the club through internal deliberation and began to be used officially.

Persis Solo began to be known by the people of Solo. Then, they began to be based at the Manahan Stadium and Sriwedari Stadium which were used as the team's training center, they also won several PSSI Perserikatan competitions seven times, namely in 1935, 1936, 1939, 1940, 1941, 1942, and 1943. Not only did they excel in the 1990s. Persis Solo started appearing in national football in 2006.

The momentum for Persis Solo's revival was only felt that year. The local government took them seriously and succeeded in being promoted to the highest caste at the time, Liga Indonesia Premier Division. Persis Solo was able to produce talented young players at that time, two of whom were goalkeeper Wahyu Tri Nugroho and defender Wahyu Wijiastanto. Both managed to enter the Indonesia national team.

Persis Solo became its own strength in 2007–08 Liga Djarum. They brought in big-name players, Greg Nwokolo, Harry Saputra, Rudi Widodo, Alvin Kie, and Frank Seator. Unfortunately, being in the highest caste only lasted a short time. In the following season, PSSI compiled the highest level competition under the name Indonesia Super League in 2008. Persis Solo was only able to finish in 10th place in the western group and failed to survive at the main level.

== Grounds ==
=== Stadium ===
Persis Solo plays their home matches at Manahan Stadium. Manahan Stadium's design adheres to the international standards for stadium design, which is completed with 20,000 individual seats. The grass used is Grass Dactylon Cynodon, which is of FIFA standard class. The stadium is equipped with: a football pitch, international-standard athletics, a dressing room, a heating room, a health room, a secretariat, a journalist and a press conference room, and some offices.

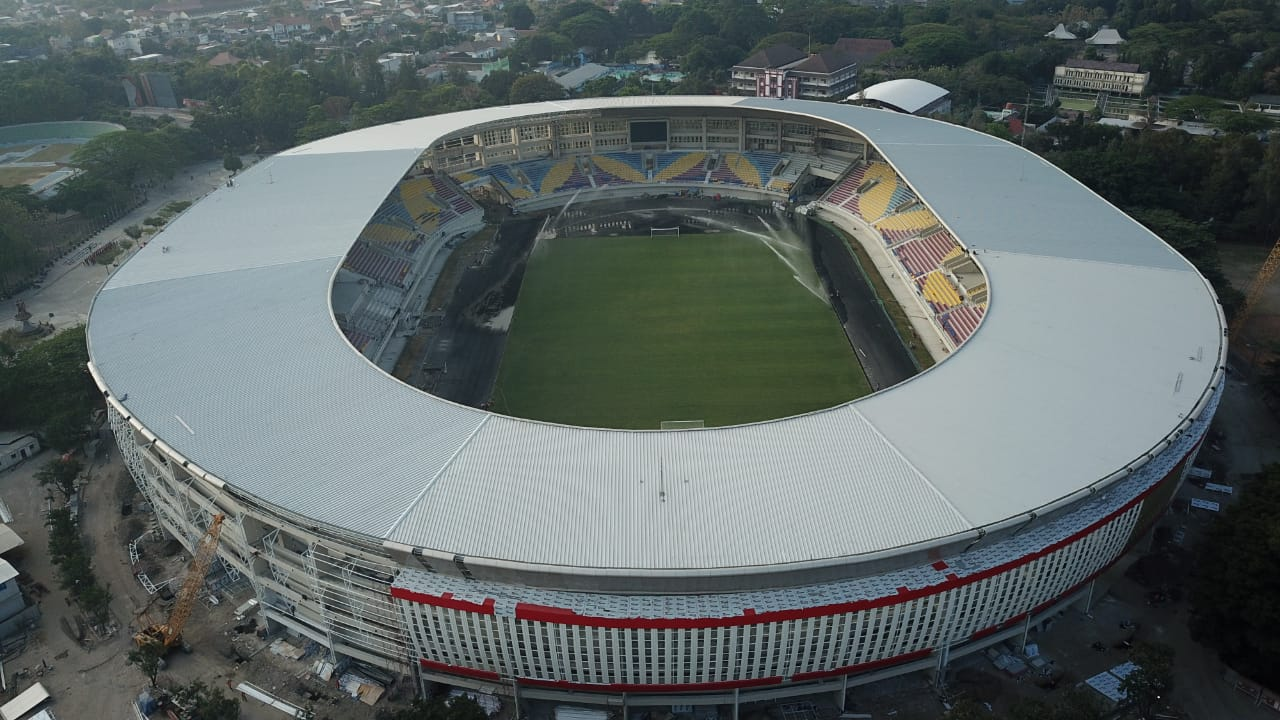
Manahan Stadium

== Sponsorship ==
The complete sponsors are as follow.

Main sponsors (2025–2026)

- Call of Duty Mobile
- Aladin Bank

== Supporters and rivalries ==
=== Supporters ===
Persis Solo's supporters are called Pasoepati. Founded in 2000 with red color as their identity. Pasoepati is one of the biggest football club supporters in Central Java.

Surakartans are the most loyal supporters of Persis, since the first time they were formed, they are supporting Persis and only Persis. They're known for their British casual culture.

Ultras 1923 are Persis Solo's supporters who are renowned for their fanatical support, with black color just like the Italian ultras.

=== Rivalries ===
Persis Solo and PSIM Yogyakarta has a classic tendencious match called the Mataram Derby.

Another rivalry called Central Java Derby, against PSIS Semarang. It's renowned for being the healthiest rivalry in Indonesian football.

== Personnel ==
=== Technical staff ===
Position	Name
Head coach	(Indonesia) Ricky Nelson
Assistant coach	(Indonesia) Randy Adam
Assistant coach	(Indonesia) Dedy Gusmawan
Goalkeeper coach	(Indonesia) Hendro Kartiko
Fitness coach	(Malaysia) Khairulanwar Md Isa
Chief Analyst	(Indonesia) Rochmat Setiawan
Analyst	(Indonesia) Taufik Novianto
Team Doctor	(Indonesia) dr. Iwan Utomo
Physiotherapist	(Indonesia) Rudi Suseno
Physiotherapist	(Indonesia) Deka Bagus Kurniagung
Masseur	(Indonesia) Fernando Nugroho

=== Head coach history ===
Years	Name	Notes
1994	(Indonesia) Hong Widodo	
2000–2001	(Indonesia) Hartono Ruslan	
2003	(Indonesia) John Lesnussa	
2006	(Indonesia) Hanafi	
2007–2008	(Indonesia) Suharno	
2009–2010	(Indonesia) Abdul Hafid Djamado	
2010	(Indonesia) Isman Jasulmei	
2011	(Serbia) Branko Babić	
2011–2012	(Indonesia) Didik Listyantoro	
2012–2013	(Indonesia) Junaedi	
2013–2015	(Indonesia) Widyantoro	
2015-2016	(Indonesia) Aris Budi Sulistyo	
2016–2017	(Indonesia) Widyantoro	
2017–2018	(Indonesia) Freddy Muli	
2018	(Indonesia) Jafri Sastra	
2018–2019	(Indonesia) Agus Yuwono	
2019	(Indonesia) Choirul Huda	
2019–2020	(Indonesia) Salahudin	
2021–2022	(Indonesia) Eko Purdjianto	
2022	(Brazil) Jacksen F. Tiago	
2022	(Indonesia) Rasiman	
2022–2023	(Mexico) Leonardo Medina	
2024	(Bosnia and Herzegovina) Milomir Šešlija	
2024–2025	(Malaysia) Ong Kim Swee	
2025	(Netherlands) Peter de Roo	
2025–	(Bosnia and Herzegovina) Milomir Šešlija	

== Players ==
=== Current squad ===
As of September 2026

Note: Flags indicate national team as defined under FIFA eligibility rules; some limited exceptions apply. Players may hold more than one non-FIFA nationality.

No.	Pos.	Nation	Player
2	DF	IDN	Novan Sasongko
3	MF	IDN	Andrean Rindorindo
4	MF	IDN	Asep Berlian
5	DF	MNE	Slavko Damjanović
6	MF	ARM	Wbeymar Angulo
7	FW	IDN	Feby Eka Putra
8	MF	IDN	Fandi Ahmad (on loan from Persija Jakarta)
9	FW	IDN	Saddam Gaffar
10	MF	BRA	Vico Duarte
11	FW	CIV	Bernard Doumbia
13	DF	IDN	Dodi Alekvan Djin
14	DF	IDN	Oliver Leeming (on loan from Persija Jakarta)
15	DF	IDN	Hasyim Kipuw
16	DF	IDN	Daffa Habibullah
18	FW	IDN	Saldi Amiruddin
19	FW	IDN	Ahmad Mujadid (on loan from Persija Jakarta)
20	GK	IDN	Teguh Amiruddin

No.	Pos.	Nation	Player
21	FW	IDN	Theodore Leeming (on loan from Persija Jakarta)
22	FW	IDN	Andy Harjito
24	FW	IDN	Faizul Mukhlisin
25	MF	IDN	Rizky Yusuf Nasution
28	MF	IDN	Terens Puhiri
29	MF	IDN	Yohanes Baghi
30	DF	IDN	Eky Taufik
31	GK	IDN	Pualam Bahari
32	DF	IDN	Kadek Raditya (on loan from Persebaya Surabaya)
40	GK	IDN	Risnanda Rafa
41	MF	IDN	Samuel Balinsa
44	DF	IDN	Riswan Lauhin
71	MF	IDN	Luthfi Kamal
78	MF	IDN	Alkelvin Bhaghi (on loan from Persija Jakarta)
88	FW	IDN	Irsyad Maulana
91	GK	IDN	Rizky Maulana Putra
95	DF	IDN	Rafa Abdurahman
99	MF	IDN	Oktafianus Fernando

=== Retired numbers ===
- 12 – The 12th man
- 17 – Ferry Anto (posthumous)
- 33 – Diego Mendieta (posthumous)

== Season-by-season records ==
Season(s)	League/Division	Tms.	Pos.	Piala Indonesia	I-League Cup	AFC/AFF competition(s)	
1994–95	First Division	16	4	–	–	–	–
1995–96	First Division	24	4th, Second round	–	–	–	–
1996–97	First Division	19	3rd, Group 2	–	–	–	–
1997–98	First Division	season abandoned		–	–	–	–
1998–99	First Division	14	5th, Group 3	–	–	–	–
1999–2000	Second Division			–	–	–	–
2001	Second Division			–	–	–	–
2002	Second Division		2nd, Third round	–	–	–	–
2003	Second Division	28	3rd, Second round	–	–	–	–
2004	Second Division	41	4th, Group F	–	–	–	–
2005	Second Division	24	3rd, Group 3	–	–	–	–
2006	First Division	36	2	–	–	–	–
2007–08	Premier Division	36	11th, East division	–	–	–	–
2008–09	Premier Division	29	11th, Group 2	–	–	–	–
2009–10	Premier Division	33	11th, Group 2	–	–	–	–
2010–11	Premier Division	39	13th, Group 2	–	–	–	–
2011–12	Premier Division (LPIS)	28	8th, Group 2	–	–	–	–
2011–12	Premier Division (LI)	22	7th, Group 1	–	–	–	–
2013	Premier Division (LI)	39	3rd, Group 5	–	–	–	–
2014	Premier Division	60	4th, Third round	–	–	–	–
2015	Premier Division	55	did not finish	–	–	–	–
2016	Indonesia Soccer Championship B	53	5th, Group 3	–	–	–	–
2017	Liga 2	61	4th, Third round	–	–	–	–
2018	Liga 2	24	5th, West region	1st round	–	–	–
2019	Liga 2	24	5th, East region	1st round	–	–	–
2020	Liga 2	24	did not finish	–	–	–	–
2021–22	Liga 2	24	1	–	–	–	–
2022–23	Liga 1	18	10	–	–	–	–
2023–24	Liga 1	18	7	–	–	–	–
2024–25	Liga 1	18	14	–	–	–	–
2025–26	Super League	18	16th	–	–	–	–
2026–27	Championship	20	TBD	–	TBD	–	–

== Honours ==
Domestic
1st tier	Titles	Runners-up	Seasons won	Seasons runners-up
Perserikatan	7	1	1935, 1936, 1939, 1940, 1941, 1942, 1943	1937
2nd tier	Titles	Runners-up	Seasons won	Seasons runners-up
Liga 2	1	0	2021–22	
First Division	0	1		2006
Perserikatan Second Division	1	0	1994	
