= 2026–27 Arema F.C. season =

Arema F.C.
2026–27 season
- CEO: Iwan Budianto
- Head coach: Marquinhos Santos (until 23 October 2026); Andre Caldas (interim, from 23 October 2026)
- Stadium: Kanjuruhan Stadium; Kapten I Wayan Dipta Stadium (only on 29 November 2026)
- Super League: 11th
- League Cup: Group stage
- Top goalscorer: League: Careca (6); All: Careca (6)
- Highest home attendance: 4,084 (vs. Persik, 18 September 2026)
- Lowest home attendance: 1,106 (vs. Dewa United Banten, 25 October 2026)
- Average home league attendance: 2,227
| Home colours | Away colours |

The 2026–27 Arema F.C. season is Arema's 37th competitive season. The club will compete in Super League. Arema Football Club a professional football club based in Malang, East Java, Indonesia.

== Squad information ==
=== First team squad ===
Note: Flags indicate national team as defined under FIFA eligibility rules; some limited exceptions apply. Players may hold more than one non-FIFA nationality.

| No. | Pos. | Nation | Player |
|---|---|---|---|
| 3 | DF | BRA | Diego Landis |
| 4 | DF | IDN | Leo Guntara |
| 5 | DF | BRA | Walisson Maia |
| 6 | MF | COL | Julián Guevara |
| 7 | FW | BRA | Gabriel Silva |
| 8 | MF | IDN | Arkhan Fikri (vice-captain) |
| 9 | FW | IDN | Mauro Zijlstra (on loan from Persija Jakarta) |
| 10 | MF | BRA | Gustavo França |
| 11 | FW | IDN | Salim Tuharea |
| 13 | FW | IDN | Hamzah Titofani |
| 14 | DF | IDN | Alfiansyah |
| 16 | GK | IDN | Erlangga Setyo |
| 17 | MF | IDN | Hanif Sjahbandi |
| 18 | MF | BRA | Betinho |
| 19 | DF | IDN | Achmad Maulana |

| No. | Pos. | Nation | Player |
|---|---|---|---|
| 21 | FW | IDN | Fikri Arjidan |
| 22 | FW | IDN | Dimas Aryaguna |
| 24 | MF | IDN | Robi Darwis |
| 25 | MF | BRA | Matheus Blade |
| 26 | GK | IDN | Syahrul Trisna |
| 29 | FW | BRA | Gustavo Henrique |
| 30 | GK | IDN | Adi Satryo |
| 31 | GK | IDN | Gianluca Pandeynuwu (on loan from Persis Solo) |
| 34 | FW | NGR | Samuel Otusanya |
| 41 | FW | IDN | Dendi Santoso |
| 66 | DF | IDN | Hansamu Yama |
| 85 | MF | IDN | Alfeandra Dewangga |
| 87 | DF | IDN | Johan Alfarizi (captain) |
| 95 | MF | BRA | Careca |
| 98 | FW | BRA | Marcos Vinicius |

=== Reserves and academy ===
Note: Flags indicate national team as defined under FIFA eligibility rules; some limited exceptions apply. Players may hold more than one non-FIFA nationality.

| No. | Pos. | Nation | Player |
|---|---|---|---|
| 23 | DF | IDN | Azmiy Aziz HS |
| 40 | MF | IDN | Abyan Adwitya Wisnu Pratista |

== Transfers ==
=== In ===
| Date | Pos. | Name | From | Fee | Ref. |
|---|---|---|---|---|---|
| 17 June 2026 | DF | (Indonesia) Hansamu Yama | (Indonesia) Persija | Free | |
| 23 June 2026 | GK | (Indonesia) Syahrul Trisna | (Indonesia) Borneo Samarinda | Free | |
| 26 June 2026 | GK | (Indonesia) Erlangga Setyo | (Indonesia) Persis | Free | |
| 30 June 2026 | MF | (Indonesia) Robi Darwis | (Indonesia) Persib | Free | |
| 5 July 2026 | DF | (Indonesia) Alfeandra Dewangga | (Indonesia) Persib | Undisclosed | |
| 6 July 2026 | MF | (Indonesia) Abyan Adwitya Wisnu Pratista | Youth sector | Promoted | |
| 6 July 2026 | DF | (Indonesia) Azmiy Aziz HS | Youth sector | Promoted | |
| 10 July 2026 | DF | (Brazil) Diego Landis | (Malaysia) Terengganu | Free | |
| 17 July 2026 | MF | (Brazil) Careca | (Malaysia) Terengganu | Free | |
| 17 July 2026 | FW | (Brazil) Marcos Vinicius | (Brazil) Volta Redonda | Undisclosed | |
| 17 July 2026 | FW | (Brazil) Gustavo Henrique | (Vietnam) Ninh Binh | Free | |
| 14 September 2026 | FW | (Nigeria) Samuel Otusanya | (Brazil) Criciúma | Free | |
| 18 September 2026 | MF | (Indonesia) Hanif Sjahbandi | (Indonesia) Persija | Free | |

=== Out ===
| Date | Pos. | Name | To | Fee | Ref. |
|---|---|---|---|---|---|
| 25 May 2026 | GK | (Brazil) Lucas Frigeri | (Indonesia) Isenmulang Kalteng (Note: Joined on 8 October 2026.) | Free | |
| 28 May 2026 | DF | (Indonesia) Rifad Marasabessy | (Indonesia) Borneo Samarinda (Note: Joined on 19 July 2026.) | Free | |
| 31 May 2026 | MF | (Brazil) Valdeci | Free agent | Free | |
| 5 June 2026 | DF | (Indonesia) Iksan Lestaluhu | (Indonesia) Java United (Note: Joined on 24 August 2026.) | Free | |
| 6 June 2026 | FW | (Indonesia) Agusti Ardiansyah | (Indonesia) RANS Nusantara (Note: Joined on 3 September 2026.) | Free | |
| 7 June 2026 | MF | (Indonesia) Aswin | (Indonesia) RANS Nusantara (Note: Joined on 20 August 2026.) | Free | |
| 8 June 2026 | GK | (Indonesia) Andrian Casvari | (Indonesia) RANS Nusantara (Note: Joined on 20 August 2026.) | Free | |
| 9 June 2026 | DF | (Indonesia) Anwar Rifai | (Indonesia) Semen Padang (Note: Joined on 26 June 2026.) | Free | |
| 9 June 2026 | DF | (Indonesia) Achmad Figo | (Indonesia) Borneo Samarinda (Note: Joined on 19 July 2026.) | Free | |
| 9 June 2026 | MF | (Indonesia) Shulton Fajar | (Indonesia) Deltras (Note: Joined on 10 August 2026.) | Free | |
| 9 June 2026 | DF | (Indonesia) Bayu Aji | (Indonesia) RANS Nusantara (Note: Joined on 27 July 2026.) | Free | |
| 10 June 2026 | FW | (Indonesia) Dedik Setiawan | (Indonesia) RANS Nusantara (Note: Joined on 31 July 2026.) | Free | |
| 11 June 2026 | FW | (Brazil) Dalberto | (Brunei) DPMM (Note: Joined on 20 July 2026.) | Free | |
| 12 June 2026 | MF | (Brazil) Pablo Oliveira | Free agent | Free | |
| 15 June 2026 | MF | (Indonesia) Samuel Balinsa | (Indonesia) Persis (Note: Joined on 21 August 2026.) | Free | |
| 15 June 2026 | DF | (Brazil) Luiz Gustavo | Free agent | Free | |
| 30 June 2026 | DF | (Brazil) Thales Lira | Free agent | Free | |
| 1 August 2026 | FW | (Indonesia) Muhammad Rafli | (Indonesia) RANS Nusantara | Free | |
| 24 August 2026 | FW | (Brazil) Joel Vinícius | (Iraq) Al-Talaba | Free | |
| 3 November 2026 | FW | (Indonesia) Razzaa Fachrezi | Retired | | |

=== Loan In ===
| Date from | Date to | Pos. | Name | From | Ref. |
|---|---|---|---|---|---|
| 24 June 2026 | End of season | GK | (Indonesia) Gianluca Pandeynuwu | (Indonesia) Persis | |
| 22 August 2026 | End of season | FW | (Indonesia) Mauro Zijlstra | (Indonesia) Persija | |

=== Loan Out ===
| Date from | Date to | Pos. | Name | To | Ref. |
|---|---|---|---|---|---|
| 24 July 2026 | End of season | MF | (Indonesia) Jayus Hariono | (Indonesia) Persiraja | |
| 25 July 2026 | End of season | FW | (Indonesia) Dwiki Mardiyanto | (Indonesia) Persiraja | |
| 20 August 2026 | End of season | DF | (Indonesia) Bayu Setiawan | (Indonesia) RANS Nusantara | |

== Pre-seasons and friendlies ==
=== Friendlies ===
| Date | Opponents | H / A | Result F–A | Scorers | Attendance |
|---|---|---|---|---|---|
| 22 August 2026 | RANS Nusantara | H | 2–0 | Diego 63', França 68' | 4,495 |
| 26 August 2026 | Persipura | H | Cancelled | | |
| 26 August 2026 | Deltras | H | 2–0 | Alfarizi, Tito | 0 |

=== Piala Presiden ===
==== Group stage ====
| Date | Opponents | H / A | Result F–A | Scorers | Attendance | Group position |
|---|---|---|---|---|---|---|
| 25 July 2026 | Persib | N | 0–1 | | 23,576 | 4th |
| 28 July 2026 | Tampines Rovers | N | 2–1 | Gustavo (2) 27', 34' | | 2nd |
| 31 July 2026 | DPMM | N | 2–0 | Gustavo (2) 35', 45+1' | | 2nd |

| Pos | Team | Pld | W | D | L | GF | GA | GD | Pts | Qualification |
|---|---|---|---|---|---|---|---|---|---|---|
| 1 | (Indonesia) Persib (H) | 3 | 3 | 0 | 0 | 3 | 0 | +3 | 9 | Advance to the Semi-Final |
| 2 | (Indonesia) Arema | 3 | 2 | 0 | 1 | 4 | 2 | +2 | 6 | Advance to the Semi-Final |
| 3 | (Singapore) Tampines Rovers | 3 | 0 | 1 | 2 | 3 | 5 | −2 | 1 | |
| 4 | (Brunei) DPMM | 3 | 0 | 1 | 2 | 2 | 5 | −3 | 1 | |

Source: Piala Presiden 2026
Rules for classification: Tiebreakers
(H) Hosts

==== Knockout phase ====
| Date | Round | Opponents | H / A | Result F–A | Scorers | Attendance |
|---|---|---|---|---|---|---|
| 4 August 2026 | Semi-finals | Persebaya | N | 0–1 | | 0 |
| 6 August 2026 | Third place play-off | Persija | N | 1–3 | Tuharea 28' | 0 |

== Competitions ==
=== Overview ===
| Competition | First match | Last match | Starting round | Final position | Record | | | | | | | |
| Competition | First match | Last match | Starting round | Final position | Pld | W | D | L | GF | GA | GD | Win % |
|---|---|---|---|---|---|---|---|---|---|---|---|---|
| Super League | 4 September 2026 | June 2027 | Matchday 1 | TBD | 10 | 3 | 3 | 4 | 20 | 20 | +0 | 30.00 |
| League Cup | 3 November 2026 | TBD | Group stage | TBD | 1 | 1 | 0 | 0 | 4 | 0 | +4 | 100.00 |
| Total | | | | | 11 | 4 | 3 | 4 | 24 | 20 | +4 | 36.36 |

Source: Competitions

=== Super League ===
==== Matches ====
| Date | Opponents | H / A | Result F–A | Scorers | Attendance | League position |
|---|---|---|---|---|---|---|
| 4 September 2026 | Isenmulang Kalteng | H | 4–0 | Alfarizi 6', Diego 14', MV 45', Mauro 85' | 1,767 | 1st |
| 13 September 2026 | PSM | A | 3–3 | Gabi 29', França 35' (pen.), Careca 60' | 0 | 4th |
| 18 September 2026 | Persik | H | 1–1 | Careca 30' (pen.) | 4,084 | 7th |
| 10 October 2026 | Bhayangkara Presisi | H | 2–2 | MV 52', Otusanya 60' | 1,528 | 9th |
| 17 October 2026 | Garudayaksa | A | 1–3 | Blade 5' | 1,882 | 10th |
| 21 October 2026 | Persija | A | 1–5 | Gabi 88' | 22,269 | 12th |
| 25 October 2026 | Dewa United Banten | H | 4–0 | Careca (2) 30', 52', Otusanya 65', Guevara 90+5' | 1,106 | 10th |
| 31 October 2026 | Bali United | H | 1–3 | Careca 79' | 2,652 | 11th |
| 6 November 2026 | Madura United | A | 0–3 | | 2,971 | 14th |
| 20 November 2026 | PSS | A | 3–0 | Alfarizi 1', Careca 44', Mauro 90+4' | 13,578 | 11th |
| 29 November 2026 | Persebaya | H | | | | |
| 5 December 2026 | Persijap | A | | | | |
| 9 December 2026 | Java United | H | | | | |
| 14 December 2026 | PSIM | A | | | | |
| 20 December 2026 | Persib | H | | | | |
| 24 December 2026 | Borneo Samarinda | A | | | | |
| 28 December 2026 | Persita | H | | | | |
| 17 January 2027 | Persebaya | A | | | | |
| 24 January 2027 | Persik | A | | | | |
| 2 February 2027 | PSM | H | | | | |
| 15 February 2027 | Dewa United Banten | A | | | | |
| 20 February 2027 | Garudayaksa | H | | | | |
| 24 February 2027 | Persita | A | | | | |
| 4 March 2027 | PSS | H | | | | |
| 21 March 2027 | Persib | A | | | | |
| 4 April 2027 | Persijap | H | | | | |
| 11 April 2027 | Bhayangkara Presisi | A | | | | |
| 18 April 2027 | Bali United | A | | | | |
| 24 April 2027 | Persija | H | | | | |
| 4 May 2027 | Java United | A | | | | |
| 10 May 2027 | PSIM | H | | | | |
| 15 May 2027 | Borneo Samarinda | H | | | | |
| 23 May 2027 | Isenmulang Kalteng | A | | | | |
| TBD | Madura United | H | | | | |

==== League table ====
| Pos | Team | Pld | W | D | L | GF | GA | GD | Pts |
|---|---|---|---|---|---|---|---|---|---|
| 9 | Persebaya | 10 | 3 | 5 | 2 | 11 | 9 | +2 | 14 |
| 10 | Garudayaksa | 10 | 4 | 2 | 4 | 13 | 16 | −3 | 14 |
| 11 | Arema | 10 | 3 | 3 | 4 | 20 | 20 | 0 | 12 |
| 12 | Borneo Samarinda | 9 | 3 | 2 | 4 | 8 | 10 | −2 | 11 |
| 13 | PSM | 10 | 2 | 5 | 3 | 11 | 15 | −4 | 11 |

Updated to match(es) played on 22 November 2026. Source: Super League 2026–27
Rules for classification: 1) Points; 2) Head-to-head points; 3) Head-to-head goal difference; 4) Head-to-head goals scored; 5) Goal difference; 6) Goals scored; 7) Fair-play points; 8) Draw.

=== League Cup ===
==== Group stage ====
| Date | Opponents | H / A | Result F–A | Scorers | Attendance | Group position |
|---|---|---|---|---|---|---|
| 3 November 2026 | RANS Nusantara | A | 4–0 | Otusanya (3) 26', 35', 53', Hanif 68' | 886 | 1st |
| 25 November 2026 | Isenmulang Kalteng | H | | | | |

| Pos | Team | Pld | W | D | L | GF | GA | GD | Pts | Qualification |
|---|---|---|---|---|---|---|---|---|---|---|
| 1 | Arema | 1 | 1 | 0 | 0 | 4 | 0 | +4 | 3 | Advance to round of 12 |
| 2 | Isenmulang Kalteng | 0 | 0 | 0 | 0 | 0 | 0 | 0 | 0 | |
| 3 | RANS Nusantara | 1 | 0 | 0 | 1 | 0 | 4 | −4 | 0 | |

Updated to match(es) played on 3 November 2026. Source: 2026–27 I.League Cup
Rules for classification: 1) Points; 2) Head-to-head points; 3) Head-to-head goal difference; 4) Head-to-head goals scored; 5) Goal difference; 6) Goals scored; 7) Fair-play points; 8) Draw.

== Statistics ==
=== Squad appearances and goals ===
| No. | Pos | Nat | Player | Total | | Super League | | League Cup | |
| No. | Pos | Nat | Player | Apps | Goals | Apps | Goals | Apps | Goals |
Goalkeepers
| 18 | GK | (Indonesia) IDN | Erlangga Setyo | 0 | 0 | 0 | 0 | 0 | 0 |
| 26 | GK | (Indonesia) IDN | Syahrul Trisna | 2 | 0 | 2 | 0 | 0 | 0 |
| 30 | GK | (Indonesia) IDN | Adi Satryo | 9 | 0 | 8 | 0 | 1 | 0 |
| 31 | GK | (Indonesia) IDN | Gianluca Pandeynuwu | 0 | 0 | 0 | 0 | 0 | 0 |
Defenders
| 3 | DF | (Brazil) BRA | Diego Landis | 10 | 1 | 10 | 1 | 0 | 0 |
| 4 | DF | (Indonesia) IDN | Leo Guntara | 10 | 0 | 2+7 | 0 | 0+1 | 0 |
| 5 | DF | (Brazil) BRA | Walisson Maia | 8 | 0 | 8 | 0 | 0 | 0 |
| 14 | DF | (Indonesia) IDN | Alfiansyah | 0 | 0 | 0 | 0 | 0 | 0 |
| 19 | DF | (Indonesia) IDN | Achmad Maulana | 10 | 0 | 10 | 0 | 0 | 0 |
| 23 | DF | (Indonesia) IDN | Azmiy Aziz HS | 0 | 0 | 0 | 0 | 0 | 0 |
| 66 | DF | (Indonesia) IDN | Hansamu Yama | 7 | 0 | 4+2 | 0 | 1 | 0 |
| 87 | DF | (Indonesia) IDN | Johan Alfarizi | 11 | 2 | 8+2 | 2 | 1 | 0 |
Midfielders
| 6 | MF | (Colombia) COL | Julián Guevara | 6 | 1 | 0+5 | 1 | 1 | 0 |
| 8 | MF | (Indonesia) IDN | Arkhan Fikri | 11 | 0 | 7+3 | 0 | 1 | 0 |
| 10 | MF | (Brazil) BRA | Gustavo França | 10 | 1 | 2+7 | 1 | 1 | 0 |
| 17 | MF | (Indonesia) IDN | Hanif Sjahbandi | 1 | 1 | 0 | 0 | 0+1 | 1 |
| 18 | MF | (Brazil) BRA | Betinho | 7 | 0 | 7 | 0 | 0 | 0 |
| 24 | MF | (Indonesia) IDN | Robi Darwis | 4 | 0 | 0+3 | 0 | 1 | 0 |
| 25 | MF | (Brazil) BRA | Matheus Blade | 8 | 1 | 7+1 | 1 | 0 | 0 |
| 40 | MF | (Indonesia) IDN | Abyan Adwitya Wisnu Pratista | 0 | 0 | 0 | 0 | 0 | 0 |
| 85 | MF | (Indonesia) IDN | Alfeandra Dewangga | 4 | 0 | 1+2 | 0 | 1 | 0 |
| 95 | MF | (Brazil) BRA | Careca | 10 | 6 | 10 | 6 | 0 | 0 |
Forwards
| 7 | FW | (Brazil) BRA | Gabriel Silva | 10 | 2 | 9+1 | 2 | 0 | 0 |
| 9 | FW | (Indonesia) IDN | Mauro Zijlstra | 9 | 2 | 1+7 | 2 | 0+1 | 0 |
| 11 | FW | (Indonesia) IDN | Salim Tuharea | 3 | 0 | 1+1 | 0 | 1 | 0 |
| 13 | FW | (Indonesia) IDN | Hamzah Titofani | 3 | 0 | 0+2 | 0 | 0+1 | 0 |
| 21 | FW | (Indonesia) IDN | Fikri Arjidan | 1 | 0 | 0 | 0 | 0+1 | 0 |
| 22 | FW | (Indonesia) IDN | Dimas Aryaguna | 0 | 0 | 0 | 0 | 0 | 0 |
| 29 | FW | (Brazil) BRA | Gustavo Henrique | 0 | 0 | 0 | 0 | 0 | 0 |
| 34 | FW | (Nigeria) NGR | Samuel Otusanya | 9 | 5 | 4+4 | 2 | 1 | 3 |
| 41 | FW | (Indonesia) IDN | Dendi Santoso | 1 | 0 | 0 | 0 | 1 | 0 |
| 98 | FW | (Brazil) BRA | Marcos Vinicius | 10 | 2 | 9+1 | 2 | 0 | 0 |
Players transferred or loaned out during the season the club
| 20 | FW | (Indonesia) IDN | Razzaa Fachrezi | 0 | 0 | 0 | 0 | 0 | 0 |

=== Top scorers ===
The list is sorted by shirt number when total goals are equal.

| Rnk | Pos | No. | Player | Super League | League Cup | Total |
|---|---|---|---|---|---|---|
| 1 | MF | 95 | (Brazil) Careca | 6 | 0 | 6 |
| 2 | FW | 34 | (Nigeria) Samuel Otusanya | 2 | 3 | 5 |
| 3 | FW | 7 | (Brazil) Gabriel Silva | 2 | 0 | 2 |
| 3 | FW | 9 | (Indonesia) Mauro Zijlstra | 2 | 0 | 2 |
| 3 | DF | 87 | (Indonesia) Johan Alfarizi | 2 | 0 | '2 |
| 3 | FW | 98 | (Brazil) Marcos Vinicius | 2 | 0 | 2 |
| 7 | DF | 3 | (Brazil) Diego Landis | 1 | 0 | 1 |
| 7 | MF | 6 | (Colombia) Julián Guevara | 1 | 0 | 1 |
| 7 | MF | 10 | (Brazil) Gustavo França | 1 | 0 | 1 |
| 7 | MF | 17 | (Indonesia) Hanif Sjahbandi | 0 | 1 | 1 |
| 7 | MF | 25 | (Brazil) Matheus Blade | 1 | 0 | 1 |
| Total | | | | 20 | 4 | 24 |
