= Arema F.C. =

Indonesian association football club in Malang Regency

Arema
- Full name: Arema Football Club
- Nicknames: Singo Edan (The Mad Lions); Aremania (supporters)
- Short name: AFC
- Founded: 11 August 1987; 39 years ago
- Ground: Kanjuruhan Stadium
- Capacity: 21,603
- Owner: PT Arema Aremania Bersatu Berprestasi Indonesia
- CEO: Iwan Budianto
- Head coach: Andre Caldas (interim)
- League: Super League
- 2025–26: Liga 1, 9th of 18
- Website: www.aremafc.com
Home colours	Away colours

Arema Football Club, commonly known as Arema, is an Indonesian professional football club based in Malang, East Java. The club competes in the Super League, the top flight of Indonesian Football. They are considered one of the best and most successful football clubs in the country, and are nicknamed "Singo Edan" ('The Mad Lions' in Javanese).

== History ==
=== The fabled origin of Arema's name ===
The name Arema refers to a legendary figure in Malang folklore called Kebo Arema who was a knight in King Kertanegara of Singhasari's court when the latter ruled the kingdom in the 13th century. The kingdom's name relates to the contemporary Singosari district of Malang Regency, located a few miles north of Malang city. According to the folklore song of Panji Wijayakrama, Kebo Arema quashed a revolt by Kelana Bhayangkara until all the rebels were crushed like leaves eaten by caterpillars. In the ancient book of Negarakertagama, Kebo Arema also was cited as the one who ended the Cayaraja rebellion. Kebo Arema also led expansionary campaigns for Kertanegara. Together with Mahisa Anengah, Kebo Arema conquered the Pamalayu Kingdom on Sumatra island centered in what is now known as Jambi province in order to have access to the Malacca Strait. The heroism of Kebo Arema is little known because history books focus on the achievements of Kertanegara as the most prominent Singhasari king.

=== In the '80s ===
The name Arema reappeared in Malang around the 1980s. While it is unclear that the revival had anything to do with Kebo Arema, the name became popular among the youth in Malang who had developed a subculture. Arema is an acronym of Arek Malang, which means Youths of Malang. The Arema subculture has distinct identities, symbols and even languages that differentiates it from the main culture in the East Java province. It is often seen as a cultural challenge to the youth culture in the provincial capital of Surabaya.

Arema was established during the peak of this subculture, on 11 August 1987, with a goal of developing professional football club in Malang. At that time, the existing Malang club, Persema Malang, depended on government budget. A professional Malang club was the brainchild of Indonesian Army Brigadier General Acub Zaenal, who was active in the PSSI, and administered the country's first professional football competition Galatama, and Dirk Sutrisno, the founder of the Armada'86, who wanted to upgrade his team. The original name was Aremada, a combination of Armada and Arema, before becoming Arema'86. However, financial difficulties delayed the official incorporation of the Arema Football Club, until Acub Zaenal rescued the cause and paved way for Arema's participation in Galatama.

Because its establishment was during the horoscope period of Leo, Arema chose the symbol of the lion, or singo (in Javanese language), which also constitutes the front part of the Singhasari or Singosari kingdom's name.

=== Galatama era ===
At the beginning of Arema's Galatama participation, the guerrilla-style search for professional-quality players took place. Arema tried to convince players of existing clubs to join, including Maryanto from Persema, Kusnadi Kamaludin from Armada, Mahdi Haris from Arseto, Jamrawi and Yohanes Geohera from Mitra Surabaya and goalkeeper Dony Latuperisa who was then undergoing PSSI suspension. A former national team coach Sinyo Aliandoe also agreed to join. For their first accommodation, Arema players used military barracks provided by the air force at Malang's Abdul Rachman Saleh Airport. The airbase's field was also used as a training ground.

Arema's Galatama achievements were initially erratic, although it never inhabited the bottom of the table. Nevertheless, Arema won the 1992 Galatama competition. At that time, the players included Indonesia national football team regulars Aji Santoso, Mecky Tata, Singgih Pitono and Jamrawi. Ever since, Arema has been considered part of the elite group with fanatical supporters, especially those who embody the youth sub-culture in Malang.

=== Liga Indonesia era ===
During the Liga Indonesia (abbreviated as Ligina) years from 1994 to 2007, Arema entered the advanced round seven times, including six times in the top 8 (1999–2000, 2001, 2002, 2005, 2006, and 2007). Despite its stable achievements, Arema was not free from financial problems. In 2003, Arema experienced severe financial difficulties, which affected the team's performance. This led to the management being handed over to the cigarette manufacturing company Bentoel Group, which runs a factory near Malang, in the middle of the 2003 season. However, Arema still could not escape relegation to the Ligina's second-tier. That said, Bentoel financing helped Arema to bounce back and win promotion in 2004. After its return to the top league, Arema won the national cup consecutively in 2005 and 2006. Arema's U-18 team also won the Soeratin Cup, the country's main youth tournament, in 2007. In 2006 and 2007, Arema and its coach Benny Dollo received awards from Tabloid Bola, Indonesia's leading sports publication.

=== Indonesia Super League era ===

2009–10 Indonesia Super League-winning team

After another conflict in Indonesia's football league administration, the first Indonesia Super League competition, the 2008–09 edition came with Arema disappointingly finishing 10th. Two months later, the Bentoel Group sold Arema to a group of fans and investors concerned about the club's performance and future. The release was also a by-product of the sale of majority shares owned by the Bentoel Group to the British American Tobacco (BAT). Before that, there was a discourse of merging Arema with Persema Malang, but supporters objected this plan. In the 2009–10 season of ISL, Arema, which was coached by Robert Alberts, won the title. Arema had a knack of coming back stronger after taking a hit, which endears it to its loyal band of supporters who accompany the team wherever they go.

=== Dualism era (2011–2014) ===
Indonesian football experienced its worst spell of management after Arema's 2010 victory with a schism within the country's football management. PSSI in 2011 endorsed a newly founded league to rebrand the ISL and launched the Liga Prima Indonesia (Indonesia Premier League/IPL) as its direct replacement. However, ISL administrators rebelled against this move and continued the ISL series. Arema was also divided into two separate entities, Arema Indonesia in IPL and Arema Indonesia (later Arema F.C.) in ISL. In 2012, Bakrie Group bought Arema after selling their ISL club Pelita Jaya (which was renamed to Pelita Bandung Raya; the club then dropped the "Pelita" name and currently competes as Madura United). The ownership change cancelled a plan to merge the two clubs.

Arema Indonesia's founders claimed they had been given permission from Lucky Acub Zaenal, the son of Acub Zaenal, the club's co-founder. Meanwhile, the Aremania fanclub rejected this, leading to the formation of Arema Cronus, which eventually became Arema FC.

=== Post dualism era ===
The dualism ended in 2014 with the PSSI taking over the rebellious group that held onto the ISL series. FIFA also intervened and punished Indonesia for its poor management, leading to a competition vacuum in 2015. During the break, the Arema factions merged and agreed to use the name Arema Cronus for the resumption of the ISL in 2016. Prior to the 2017 season, the club changed its name again from to Arema FC amid fan protests.

=== Liga 1 era ===
In the first Liga 1 season in 2017, Arema appointed Aji Santoso as the coach and introduced the "Pandawa 5", which consists of five club legends appointed as coaching staff. However, this concept did not last long, because coach Aji Santoso resigned. Joko Susilo, who became the successing coach, brought Arema to finish at 9th place with 49 points. Arema's management also maintained Susilo, is familiarly called as Gethuk, in the 2018 Liga 1 season.

In the 2018 Liga 1 season, Arema performed poorly at the start, with only one win from the first 6 matches, leading to the sacking of Joko Susilo. Milan Petrović was appointed as Arema's coach, who previously serving as assistant. Arema's performance improved by finishing at 6th position.

In the 2019 Liga 1 season, Milomir Šešlija was appointed as the new head coach. He had led the team at 2016 Indonesia Soccer Championship A. The performance of Singo Edan's squad in the season was good at the beginning, but continued to decline at the end of the competition. At the end of the season, Arema occupied the 9th position in the final standings.

The change in the composition of the players was quite extreme and Arema welcomed the 2020 Liga 1 season with the entry of the former coach of Borneo F.C., Mario Gómez. However, the competition was stopped due to the COVID-19 pandemic, and Arema was at 12th place.

Under Eduardo Almeida, Arema experienced the longest unbeaten run in the 2021–22 season, 23 matches. It started at matchday 4 and ended at matchday 27, when they lost in the Super East Java Derby against bitter rivals Persebaya Surabaya with the final score of 1–0 at Kapten I Wayan Dipta Stadium. Despite this achievement, Arema ended 4th in the Liga 1 standings for the 2021–22 season.

On 23 August 2022, Arema ceased their sponsorship deal with Bola88.fun, a sports betting website, after national investigation of clubs featuring sponsorship from alleged gambling sites. As a result of Kanjuruhan Stadium disaster on 1 October 2022, which killed 135 fans, the club was fined Rp. 250 million, required to hold home matches behind closed doors and away from at least 250 km from their home base, and two Arema officials were banned from the sport by PSSI. On 29 October 2022, Gilang Widya, the club's chairman in office at the time, announced his resignation from the job.

== Club ownership ==
At the time Arema was managed by Bentoel Group, the legal entity name used was PT. Arema Indonesia. The legal entity name was still used by the Arema Foundation ownership after Bentoel returned club management to the Arema Foundation in 2009 to 2015. When it was returned to the Arema Foundation in 2009, the composition of the shareholders of PT. Arema Indonesia was the Arema Foundation with 13 shares (93%, majority) and Lucky Andriandana Zainal with one share (7%), which was given as a tribute to him as the founder of Arema. President Director of PT. Arema Indonesia was Iwan Budianto and the General Manager was Ruddy Widodo.

Since 2015, Iwan Budianto has formed a new legal entity as the manager of Arema FC as a result of the ban on using PT. Arema Indonesia from Badan Olahraga Profesional (Professional Sports Bureau/BOPI) because Arema FC is not under the auspices of PT. Arema Indonesia. The new legal entity used and registered by Arema since 2015 is PT. Arema Aremania Bersatu Berprestasi Indonesia (AABBI).

Since 6 June 2021, Arema entered a new era ahead of the launch of the 2021–22 season, after the directors of the club appointed entrepreneur Gilang Widya Pramana (commonly known as "Juragan99") as club president. Gilang appointed Ali Rifki as the club's general manager. On 29 October 2022, Gilang and Ali Rifki publicly declared his resignation from the board management of Arema FC. The club owned by PSSI vice president Iwan Budianto again through newly appointed PT. AABBI commissioner Tatang Dwi Arifianto, NZR Group owner Wiebie Dwi Andriyas chosen as club's new general manager.

== Stadium ==
In 2004 Arema started playing their home matches in the Kanjuruhan Stadium which replaced the Gajayana Stadium. The stadium initially had a capacity of 42,449 (without single seats) and use grass is Lamuran grass (Polytrias). But after the Kanjuruhan Stadium disaster, Kanjuruhan Stadium renovated with a reduced capacity to 21,603 and use grass is Zoysia matrella.

=== Kanjuruhan Stadium Disaster ===
On 1 October 2022, in the Super East Java derby between Arema and Persebaya Surabaya, there was a crowd crush after the match due to the police over-using tear gas. As a result of the disaster, all Liga 1 matches were suspended for a week. At least 135 died and 583 injured in the disaster. Besides that, Arema had to play their home matches behind closed doors until the end of the 2022–23 season.

== Kit suppliers ==
Year(s)	Manufacturer(s)
1995–1998	(Germany) Adidas
1999–2000	(United Kingdom) Reebok
2001	(United States) Nike
2007–2009	(Germany) Puma
2009–2010	(Italy) Diadora
2010–2011	(Italy) Lotto
2011	(Indonesia) Axl
2012–2013	(Indonesia) Ultras
2013–2014	(Spain) Joma
2015–2018	(Indonesia) Specs
2019	(Spain) Munich
2019–2024	(Indonesia) Singo Edan Apparel
2024–	(Indonesia) Etams

== Crest and colours ==
The nickname for Arema FC is "Singo Edan" ("The Mad Lions" in Javanese), in line with the lion symbol and spirited nature of its fans. There have been several color changes throughout Arema's turbulent history but the official colors now are blue and red.

== Sponsorship ==
The complete sponsors are as follow

Main sponsors

- balé by BTN

Other sponsors

- TCT

== Supporters and rivalries ==
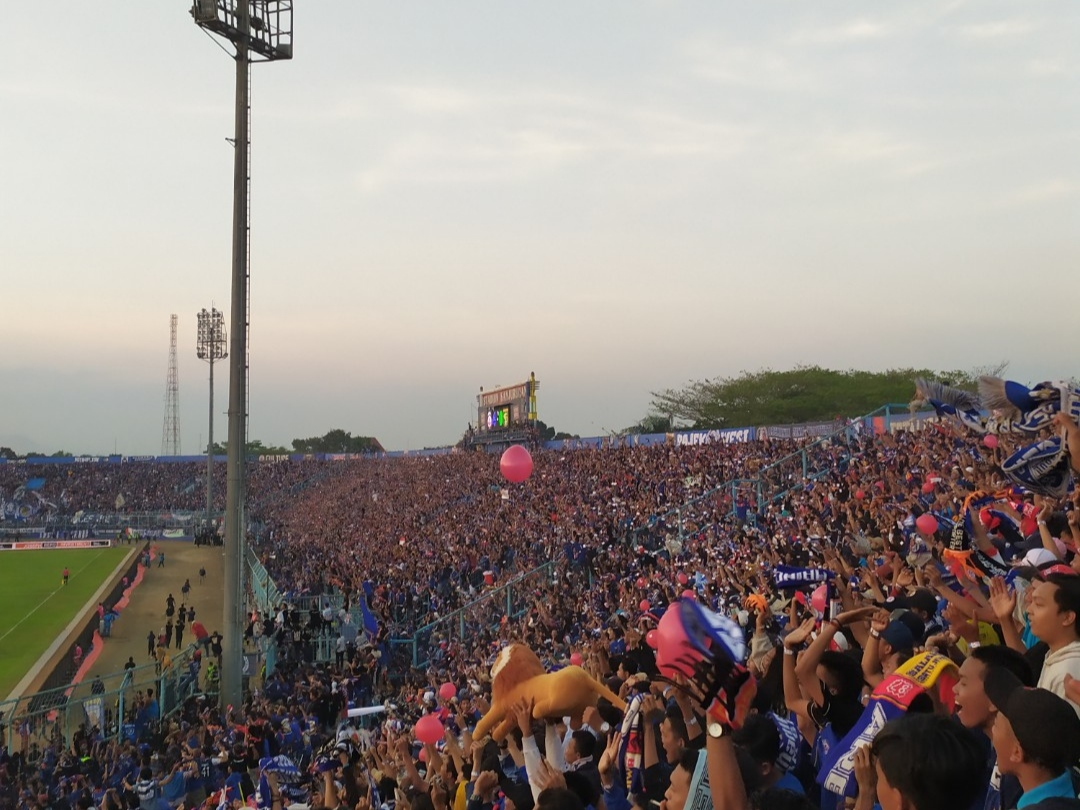
Aremania in the derby at their home on 15 August 2019

=== Supporters ===
Arema's supporters are known as Aremania and Aremanita. After the Liga Indonesia began in 1997, Aremania emerged as a support group with an aggressive reputation nationwide.

=== Rivalries ===
Aremania have a very strong rivalry with supporters of Persebaya Surabaya, who are known as Bonek during games between the two sides, which is known as the Super East Java derby. These meetings often escalates into violence.

== Players ==
=== Current squad ===
As of 3 November 2026

Note: Flags indicate national team as defined under FIFA eligibility rules; some limited exceptions apply. Players may hold more than one non-FIFA nationality.

No.	Pos.	Nation	Player
3	DF	BRA	Diego Landis
4	DF	IDN	Leo Guntara
5	DF	BRA	Walisson Maia
6	MF	COL	Julián Guevara
7	FW	BRA	Gabriel Silva
8	MF	IDN	Arkhan Fikri (vice-captain)
9	FW	IDN	Mauro Zijlstra (on loan from Persija Jakarta)
10	MF	BRA	Gustavo França
11	FW	IDN	Salim Tuharea
13	FW	IDN	Hamzah Titofani
14	DF	IDN	Alfiansyah
16	GK	IDN	Erlangga Setyo
17	MF	IDN	Hanif Sjahbandi
18	MF	BRA	Betinho
19	DF	IDN	Achmad Maulana

No.	Pos.	Nation	Player
21	FW	IDN	Fikri Arjidan
22	FW	IDN	Dimas Aryaguna
24	MF	IDN	Robi Darwis
25	MF	BRA	Matheus Blade
26	GK	IDN	Syahrul Trisna
29	FW	BRA	Gustavo Henrique
30	GK	IDN	Adi Satryo
31	GK	IDN	Gianluca Pandeynuwu (on loan from Persis Solo)
34	FW	NGR	Samuel Otusanya
41	MF	IDN	Dendi Santoso
66	DF	IDN	Hansamu Yama
85	MF	IDN	Alfeandra Dewangga
87	DF	IDN	Johan Alfarizi (captain)
95	MF	BRA	Careca
98	MF	BRA	Marcos Vinicius

=== Out on loan ===
Note: Flags indicate national team as defined under FIFA eligibility rules; some limited exceptions apply. Players may hold more than one non-FIFA nationality.

No.	Pos.	Nation	Player
27	DF	IDN	Bayu Setiawan (at RANS Nusantara)
—	MF	IDN	Jayus Hariono (at Persiraja Banda Aceh)

No.	Pos.	Nation	Player
—	FW	IDN	Dwiki Mardiyanto (at Persiraja Banda Aceh)

=== Reserves and academy ===
Note: Flags indicate national team as defined under FIFA eligibility rules; some limited exceptions apply. Players may hold more than one non-FIFA nationality.

No.	Pos.	Nation	Player
23	DF	IDN	Azmiy Aziz HS
40	MF	IDN	Abyan Adwitya Wisnu Pratista

=== Retired numbers ===
- 1 – Kurnia Meiga
- 47 – Achmad Kurniawan (posthumous)

== Club officials ==
=== Coaching staff ===
Position	Name
Technical director	(Indonesia) Yeyen Tumena
Head coach	(Brazil) Andre Caldas (interim)
Assistant coach	(Indonesia) Doni Suherman
Assistant coach	(Indonesia) Siswantoro
Goalkeeper coach	(Portugal) Tiago Simoes
Assistant goalkeeper coach	(Indonesia) Galih Firmansyah
Physical Coach	(Brazil) Carlos Airon
Team doctor	(Indonesia) Nanang Tri Wahyudi
Nutritionist	(Indonesia) Syeh Alfin Abdullah
Physiotherapist	(Indonesia) Reta Arroyan
Masseur	(Indonesia) Ahmad Salik
Masseur	(Indonesia) Samsul Hidayat
Kitman	(Indonesia) Eko Slamet Riyadi
Kitman	(Indonesia) Moch. Saiful
Kitman	(Indonesia) Rendik Hermawan
Analyst	(Brazil) Matheus Lacerda

=== Management ===
Position	Name
Chief executive officer	(Indonesia) Iwan Budianto
Chief business and commercial officer	(Indonesia) Irma Prianti
Team manager	(Indonesia) Muhammad Yusrinal Fitriandi
Assistant team manager	(Indonesia) Son Haji
Marketing communication & public relations	(Indonesia) Munif Bagaskara Wakid
Club secretary	(Indonesia) Rahmad Taufiq Hentihu
Media officer	(Indonesia) Toby Himawan Pratiko

== Season-by-season records ==
=== Past seasons ===
Season	League/Division	Tms.	Pos.	Piala Indonesia	I-League Cup	ACLE	ACL 2	ACGL	ACC
1994–95	Premier Division	34	6 in East Div.	–	–	–	–	–	–
1995–96	Premier Division	31	12 in East Div.	–	–	–	–	–	–
1996–97	Premier Division	33	Second round	–	–	–	–	–	–
1997–98	Premier Division	31	did not finish	–	–	–	–	–	–
1998–99	Premier Division	28	3 in Central Div.	–	–	–	–	–	–
1999–2000	Premier Division	28	Second round	–	–	–	–	–	–
2001	Premier Division	28	Second round	–	–	–	–	–	–
2002	Premier Division	24	Second round	–	–	–	–	–	–
2003	Premier Division	20	17	–	–	–	–	–	–
2004	First Division	22	1	–	–	–	–	–	–
2005	Premier Division	28	Second round	Champions	–	–	–	–	–
2006	Premier Division	28	Second round	Champions	–	–	–	–	–
2007–08	Premier Division	36	Second round	Second round	–	Group Stage	–	–	–
2008–09	Super League	18	10	First round	–	–	–	–	–
2009–10	Super League	18	1	Runners-up	–	–	–	–	–
2010–11	Super League	18	2	–	–	Group Stage	–	–	–
2011–12	Super League	18	12	Quarter-finals	–	–	Quarter-finals	–	–
2013	Super League	18	2	–	–	–	–	–	–
2014	Super League	22	Semi-finals	–	–	–	Round of 16	–	–
2015	Super League	18	did not finish	–	–	–	–	–	–
2016 (Note: Not an official competition affiliated with PSSI, AFC & FIFA)	Soccer Championship A	18	2	–	–	–	–	–	–
2017	Liga 1	18	9	–	–	–	–	–	–
2018	Liga 1	18	6	Round of 16	–	–	–	–	–
2019	Liga 1	18	9	Round of 16	–	–	–	–	–
2020	Liga 1	18	did not finish	–	–	–	–	–	–
2021–22	Liga 1	18	4	–	–	–	–	–	–
2022–23	Liga 1	18	12	–	–	–	–	–	–
2023–24	Liga 1	18	15	–	–	–	–	–	–
2024–25	Liga 1	18	10	–	–	–	–	–	–
2025–26	Super League	18	9	–	–	–	–	–	–
2026–27	Super League	18	TBD	–	TBD	–	–	–	–

Key

- Tms. = Number of teams
- Pos. = Position in league

=== Continental record ===
Season	Competition	Round	Nat	Club	Home	Away	Aggregate
1993–94	Asian Club Championship	Preliminary round	(Vietnam)	Quang Nam (Da Nang)	1–0	1–2	3–1
1993–94	Asian Club Championship	First round	(Thailand)	Thai Farmers Bank	2–2	4–1	3–6
2007	AFC Champions League	Group F	(Japan)	Kawasaki Frontale	1–3	3–0	3rd
2007	AFC Champions League	Group F	(South Korea)	Chunnam Dragons	0–1	2–0	3rd
2007	AFC Champions League	Group F	(Thailand)	Bangkok University	1–0	0–0	3rd
2011	AFC Champions League	Group G	(Japan)	Cerezo Osaka	0–4	2–1	4th
2011	AFC Champions League	Group G	(South Korea)	Jeonbuk Hyundai Motors	0–4	6–0	4th
2011	AFC Champions League	Group G	(China)	Shandong Luneng	1–1	5–0	4th
2012	AFC Cup	Group H	(Myanmar)	Ayeyawady United	1–1	0–3	2nd
2012	AFC Cup	Group H	(Vietnam)	Navibank Sài Gòn	6–2	3–1	2nd
2012	AFC Cup	Group H	(Malaysia)	Kelantan	1–3	3–0	2nd
2012	AFC Cup	Round of 16	(Hong Kong)	Kitchee	0–2		
2012	AFC Cup	Quarter-finals	(Saudi Arabia)	Al-Ettifaq	0–2	2–0	0–4
2014	AFC Cup	Group F	(Malaysia)	Selangor	1–0	1–1	2nd
2014	AFC Cup	Group F	(Vietnam)	Hà Nội T&T	1–3	2–1	2nd
2014	AFC Cup	Group F	(Maldives)	Maziya	3–2	1–3	2nd
2014	AFC Cup	Round of 16	(Hong Kong)	Kitchee	2–0		

=== Performance in AFC competitions ===
- Asian Club Championship/AFC Champions League
  - 1993–94 – First round
  - 2007 – Group stage
  - 2011 – Group stage
- AFC Cup
  - 2012 – Quarter-finals
  - 2014 – Round of 16

== Head coach's history ==
Head Coach by years (1987–present)

Years	Name
1987–1989	(Indonesia) Sinyo Aliandoe
1989–1992	(Indonesia) Andi M. Teguh
1992–1993	(Indonesia) M. Basri
1993–1994	(Indonesia) Gusnul Yakin
1994–1995	(Indonesia) Halilintar Gunawan
1995–1996	(Indonesia) Gusnul Yakin
1996–1997	(Indonesia) Suharno
1997–1998	(Indonesia) Gusnul Yakin
1998	(Indonesia) Hamid Asnan
1998–1999	(Indonesia) Winarto
2000	(Indonesia) M. Basri
2001–2002	(Indonesia) Daniel Roekito
2003	(Indonesia) Gusnul Yakin
2003	(Australia) Terry Wetton
2003	(Netherlands) Henk Wullems
2004–2006	(Indonesia) Benny Dollo
2006–2007	(Czech Republic) Miroslav Janů
2008	(Indonesia) Bambang Nurdiansyah
2008–2009	(Indonesia) Gusnul Yakin
2009–2010	(Netherlands) Robert Alberts
2010–2011	(Czech Republic) Miroslav Janů
2011–2012	(Bosnia and Herzegovina) Milomir Šešlija (IPL)
2012	(Indonesia) Abdul Rahman Gurning (IPL)
2012	(Serbia) Dejan Antonić (IPL)
2011–2012	(Austria) Wolfgang Pikal (ISL)
2012	(Indonesia) Joko Susilo (ISL)
2012	(Indonesia) Suharno (ISL)
2012–2013	(Indonesia) Rahmad Darmawan
2013–2015	(Indonesia) Suharno
2015–2016	(Indonesia) Joko Susilo
2016	(Bosnia and Herzegovina) Milomir Šešlija
2017	(Indonesia) Aji Santoso
2017–2018	(Indonesia) Joko Susilo
2018	(Slovenia) Milan Petrović
2019	(Bosnia and Herzegovina) Milomir Šešlija
2020	(Argentina) Mario Gómez
2020–2021	(Brazil) Carlos Oliviera
2021	(Indonesia) Kuncoro
2021–2022	(Portugal) Eduardo Almeida
2022–2023	(Chile) Javier Roca
2023	(Indonesia) Joko Susilo
2023	(Indonesia) Kuncoro
2023–2024	(Portugal) Fernando Valente
2024	(Indonesia) Putu Gede Suwi Santoso
2024	(Indonesia) Widodo Cahyono Putro
2024	(Brazil) Joel Cornelli
2024–2025	(Indonesia) Kuncoro
2025	(Portugal) Zé Gomes
2025–2026	(Brazil) Marquinhos Santos
2026–	(Brazil) Andre Caldas

Notes:

1. Coaches in italic indicate the caretaker position.

== Honours ==
=== National League ===
- Indonesia Super League
  - Champions (1): 2009–10
  - Runners-up (2): 2010–11, 2013
- Galatama
  - Champions (1): 1992–93
- Liga Indonesia First Division
  - Winners (1): 2004

=== National Cups ===
- Copa/Piala Indonesia
  - Winners (2): 2005, 2006
  - Runners-up (1): 2010
- Menpora Cup
  - Winners (1): 2013
- Inter Island Cup
  - Winners (1): 2014/15
- Piala Presiden
  - Winners (4): 2017, 2019, 2022, 2024
- Indonesian Community Shield
  - Runners-up (1): 2010

=== Others Tournament ===
- Piala Gubernur Jatim, East Java
  - Winners (1): 2013
  - Runners-up (2): 2008, 2012
- SCM Cup
  - Winners (1): 2015
- Bali Island Cup
  - Winners (2): 2015, 2016
- Bhayangkara Cup
  - Winners (2): 2016, 2017

== Ranking ==
World clubs ranking

As of 4 August 2024.

Current Rank	Country	Team	Points
1381	(Ecuador)	Gualaceo S.C.	1310
1382	(Belgium)	R.A.E.C. Mons (1910)	1310
1383	(Indonesia)	Arema FC	1310
1384	(Japan)	Kyoto Sanga FC	1309
1385	(Egypt)	Telephonat Beni Suef SC	1309

AFC clubs ranking

As of 4 August 2024.

Current Rank	Country	Team	Points
142	(South Korea)	Seongnam FC	1310
143	(Indonesia)	Bhayangkara FC	1310
144	(Indonesia)	Arema FC	1310
145	(Japan)	Kyoto Sanga FC	1309
146	(South Korea)	Busan I'Park	1308
