= Super East Java derby =

Match between two Indonesian football clubs in East Java

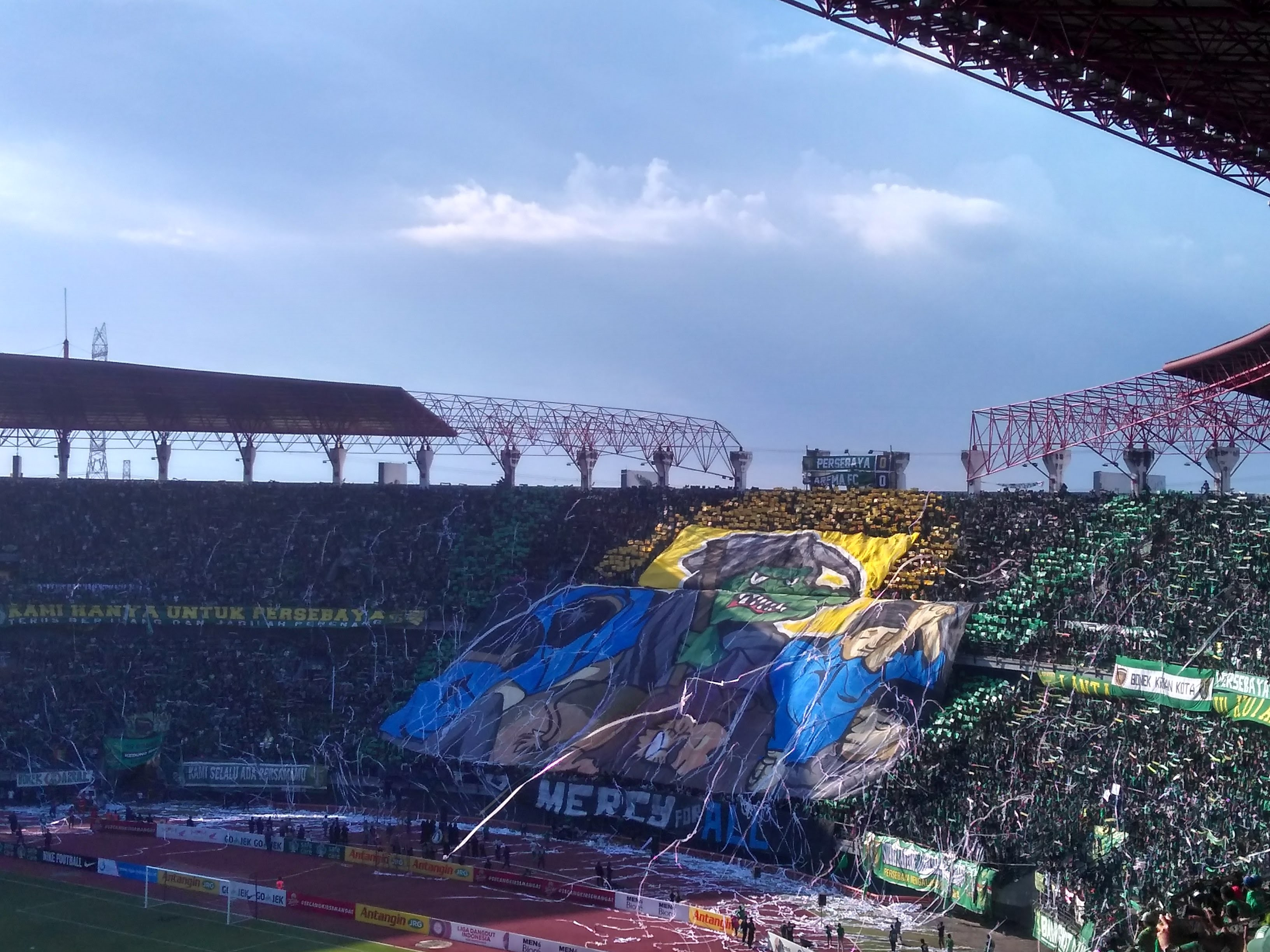
- Super East Java Derby of 6 May 2018 at the Gelora Bung Tomo Stadium in Surabaya
- Location: East Java
- Teams: Arema; Persebaya Surabaya
- First meeting: 29 August 1992; Arema 2–0 Persebaya
- Latest meeting: 4 August 2026; 2026 Piala Presiden; Persebaya 1–0 Arema
- Next meeting: 29 November 2026; Super League; Arema v Persebaya
- Stadiums: Kanjuruhan Stadium (Arema); Gelora Bung Tomo Stadium (Persebaya)

Statistics
- Total meetings: 40
- Most wins: Persebaya (18)
- All-time series: Arema: 13; Draw: 9 Persebaya: 18
- Largest victory: 26 March 1997; Premier Division; Persebaya 6–1 Arema
- Longest win streak: 6 games Persebaya (2022–2024)
- Longest unbeaten streak: 13 games Persebaya (2019–present)
- Current unbeaten streak: 13 games Persebaya (2019–present)

Super East Java derby is the name given in football rivalries to any match between two Indonesian football clubs based in East Java, Arema and Persebaya Surabaya. The fierce competition between both teams began in 1992 when Arema and Persebaya were grouped together in a tournament celebrating the former's anniversary in 1992.

Arema and Persebaya Surabaya were established on different era, at which Arema was formed in 1987, while Persebaya in 1927. Both teams have groups of fans who are equally well-known fanatics, namely Aremania (Arema) and Bonek (Persebaya Surabaya). Both fans have also been known for their psywar, conducted throughout the game, making the rivalrous match much awaited.

== History ==
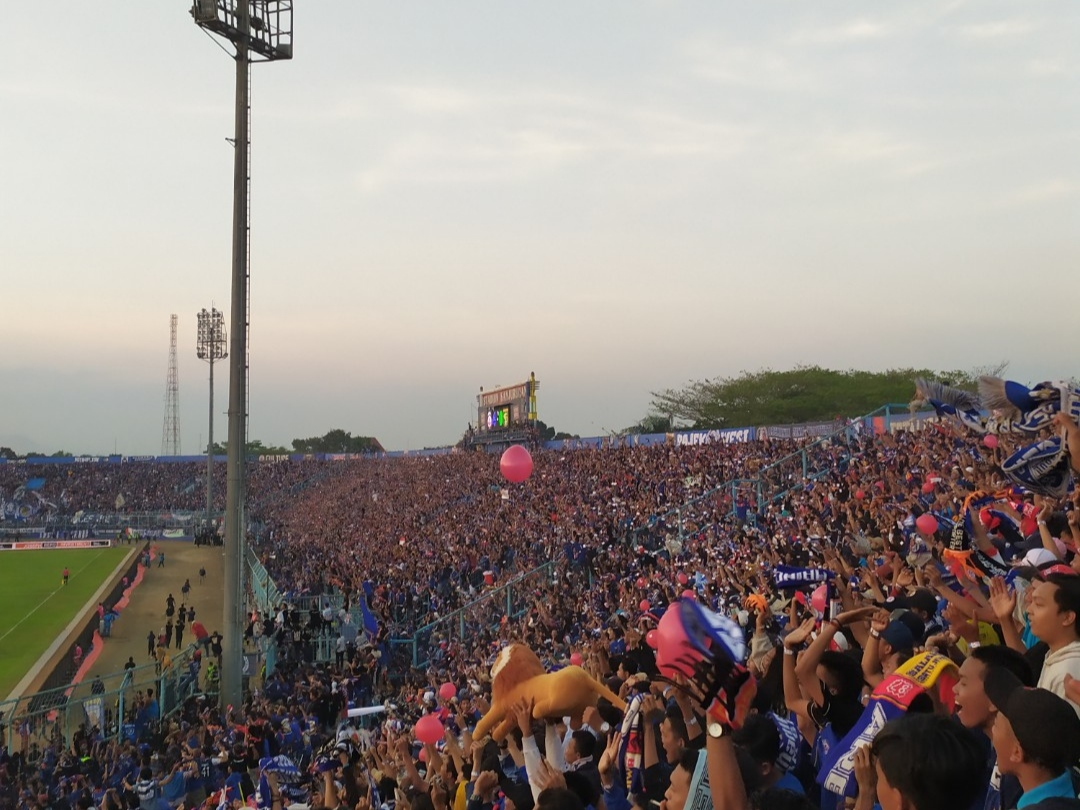
Aremania in the derby at their home on 15 August 2019

The atmosphere on the first meeting between Arema and Persebaya was mediocre, most probably as a result of both teams playing in different competitions. Persebaya was competing in Perserikatan, while Arema participated in Galatama.

Initially, the feud was not between Arema and Persebaya. Persebaya's rival was Persema Malang in Perserikatan, whereas Arema was against Mitra Surabaya (formerly known as Niac Mitra) in Galatama.

The situation had changed since Perserikatan and Galatama were merged into Liga Indonesia in 1994. Although Persema and Mitra Surabaya were still in the competition at that time, Persebaya and Arema were gaining much attention from their fans. Therefore, the East Java derby began.

As time has gone by, Persema's achievement was no better than Arema and Mitra Surabaya was disbanded. As a result, many football fans decided to support Arema and Persebaya instead. Because the competition between the two teams is remarkably intense, Arema and Persebaya have to be separated into different region groups (east and west) in the league. It was intended to avoid friction between fans in the event of the derby. The East Java derby remains inevitable in the absence of the region separation system, however. A joint agreement signed in 1998 forbade the two fan groups from meeting in a stadium, although it was rarely practiced.

On 1 October 2022, at least 135 people were killed in a stampede inside the stadium.

== Incidents ==
=== Kantata Takwa concert ===
On 23 January 1990, Iwan Fals launched the Kantata Takwa album in Tambaksari Stadium, the previous home base of Persebaya. In the first 30 minutes of this concert, Bonek fans felt upset because the festival area was occupied by Aremania, which made pro-Arema chants. Nevertheless, the Aremania keep trying to defend themselves in the festival area, although the Bonek tried to throw out the Aremania from the concert. After the concert ended, riots broke out outside the stadium, which went as far as the Gubeng train station.

=== Sepultura's Indonesia tour ===
In July 1992, Sepultura, a Brazilian heavy metal band, took part in a series of world tour concerts in Indonesia by holding a roadshow at Jakarta and Surabaya. The Surabaya roadshow was hosted at the Tambaksari Stadium, the venue of the Iwan Fals' concert two years prior. In return for the Iwan Fals concert, the Bonek fans occupied the festival area and dispelled the arrival of Aremania from the Tambaksari Stadium to watch the concert. Riots also broke out outside the stadium.

=== Nurkiman's incident ===
On 26 December 1995, Persebaya played an away match against Persema Malang. The match ended with a draw score, 1–1. On the way home to Surabaya, Persema's fans, the Ngalamania, threw rocks into Persebaya's buses. The rocks damaged the mirror of the bus, resulting in permanent left eye blindness to Nurkiman, Persebaya's attacking midfielder, that affected their ultimately victorious 1996/1997 season.

=== Aremania's awaydays in Surabaya ===
On 15 November 1997, Arema played an away match against Persebaya in Tambaksari Stadium, with the Aremania occupying the VIP tribune with a police escort. The match took place safely without any on-stadium incidents; apart from a brawl between the Bonek and Mitra's fans against Aremania and Ngalamania. As the host, Bonek also made several chants critical of the referee.

=== Asuemper case ===
On 4 September 2006, the second leg of a Copa Indonesia quarter-finals match between Persebaya against Arema in Tambaksari Stadium ended with a draw score, 1–1, knocking Persebaya out of the semi-finals as the club had lost in the previous leg held in Malang.

This resulted in a riot called "Asuemper" ("Amuk Suporter Empat September" – "September Fourth Supporters Riots"), one of the biggest fan riots in East Java and Indonesian football history, until the 2022 Kanjuruhan Stadium disaster. In the riots, the Bonek burned three cars, and injured 14 in the riots including 13 police officers.

=== Kanjuruhan Stadium disaster ===
The deadliest incident in the Super East Java derby history occurred in Kanjuruhan Stadium on 1 October 2022, when Persebaya won Arema 3–2 at the end of the match. After the police took harsh measures on some spectators, who take photos with Arema players, approximately 3,000 Arema fans invaded the pitch and wreaked havoc along their way, causing Persebaya's players to hide inside police Armoured personnel carriers before they could leave the stadium. Indonesian police tackled the situation using tear gas in order to dispersed the fans, but the situation worsened when tear gas being trapped in wind conditions, asphyxiating Arema fans invading the pitch. According to official police accounts, the tear gas caused the Arema fans to rush for the single exit point, resulting in a stampede and further asphxiations along the way.

Early reports stated that the disaster caused 182 fatalities, with later reports showing 131 fatalities, and final report from Muhadjir Effendy showed that the fatalities count was 125. However, according to Malang Regency government's Postmortem Crisis Center Post, their fatalities count was initially 133, but their final report stated that the fatalities count was 131. Confirmed casualties from police reports were 125 Arema fans and 2 Indonesian police officers. Approximately 180–310 others were injured from the disaster in early reports, but Effendy's report stated that 323 others were injured in the disaster, including 21 who were in serious conditions. Until 24 October 2022, the reported number of casualties have been adjusted to 135 fatalities and 583 injuries, became the second deadliest incident in association football worldwide, and the deadliest in Asia, Indonesia and the eastern hemisphere.

As a result of this disaster, all Liga 1 matches were suspended for initially a week, but were extended to 2 weeks with the addition of Liga 2 matches, until the joint fact-finding team decided to suspend all PSSI leagues until the president's approval of normalization was approved. The Football Association of Indonesia banned Arema from hosting home matches until the end of the season, with further life bans from PSSI Disciplinary Commission to Arema FC match organizing committee Abdul Haris and Arema security officer Suko Sutrisno being issued. Additionally, Arema was also banned from holding matches with spectators as host, and their matches had to be held far from Malang's home base being also issued. Indonesian President Joko Widodo instructed the association to suspend all Liga 1 matches until an "evaluation of improvement of security procedures" was carried out. The decision to hold the match by the organizer of Liga 1 was agreed upon by shareholders. Compensations for victims who were affected by this disaster were provided by the Governor of East Java Khofifah Indar Parawansa, with compensation for deceased's relatives being 10 million rupiah (US$698.9), and injured victims being 5 million rupiah (US$349.45).

Investigations toward Indonesian police were issued after the disaster: the usage of tear gas by the police was also under scrutiny by the National Commission on Human Rights of Indonesia and Deputy Chairman of Commission III of the DPR-RI Ahmad Sahroni because their usage was prohibited according to FIFA, with a further request from Sahroni to National Police Chief General Listyo Sigit Prabowo to take firm action against the officers responsible for the use of tear gas. As a response to their request, the chief of regional police defended its use, citing the threats posed by the rioters to the team's players and officials, however they also stated that they would evaluate the use of tear gas. A joint fact-finding team headed by Coordinating Minister for Political, Legal and Security Affairs Mahfud MD and Minister of Youth and Sports Zainudin Amali was also formed, but none from the Football Association of Indonesia joined. On 6 October 2022, Prabowo announced 6 suspects responsible for the disaster: the organizer of Liga 1, Arema head of security officer, the Arema match organising committee for negligence and 3 police officers for tear gas usage.

Legal proceedings from third party organizations were also issued: the Institute for Security and Strategic Studies (ISESS), an Indonesian defence and security think tank, and the Indonesian Police Watch (IPW) ordered to dismiss the Malang police chief, Adjunct Chief Commissioner Ferli Hidayat, with further calls for dismissal of the East Java police chief Inspector General Nico Afinta in the ISESS side, and the request for Afinta to bring the organizers of the match to trial in the IPW side. As a result, Prabowo dismissed Hidayat and 9 officers from East Java Mobile Brigade Corps on 3 October 2022.

FIFA announced that they would not issue any sanctions to PSSI, instead they would work with AFC and PSSI to establish security procedures and standards in comply to international standards. They will discuss to local football clubs and experts for suggestions, advices and commitments, re-assess the schedule and performing risk–benefit analysis. A special office in Indonesia was also established. FIFA also agreed with Indonesian government to reforming the system, infrastructure, football standards and fan culture to ensure that all aspects in Indonesian football is comply to FIFA standards, while managing the run of 2023 FIFA U-20 World Cup as scheduled with the government. In addition, Joko Widodo also issued orders to rebuild Kanjuruhan Stadium according to FIFA standards.

== Results ==
=== Match results ===
The record counts all competitions (league, official tournament and pre-season tournament). This list does not include matches involving Arema IPL side which played in the Indonesian Premier League (2011–2013), Liga 3 (2017–2023), and Liga 4 (2024–now) because the ruling court had decided that the team had no right to the Arema trademark and change its name became Arek Malang Indonesia and Persebaya DU (PT. MMIB) side which played in the Indonesian Premier Division (2010–2013) and Indonesia Super League (2014–2015) because the ruling court had decided that the team had no right to the Persebaya trademark and change its name became Bhayangkara Presisi Lampung.

Competition	Date	Home team	Result	Away team	Venue	City
1992 Arema Anniversary Cup	29 August 1992	Arema	2–0	Persebaya	Gajayana Stadium	Malang
1992 Premier Cup (Note: The Premier Cup was tournament created by PSSI in 1990 that brought together each of the four best clubs from both Galatama dan Perserikatan.)	25 October 1992 (Note: Pertemuan pertama Arema vs Persebaya. Archived 18 June 2019 at the Wayback Machine. vamosarema.com. Accessed date 30/09/2019.)	Arema	2–1	Persebaya	Andi Mattalatta Stadium	Makassar
1994–95 Premier Division	29 March 1995	Arema	1–0	Persebaya	Gajayana Stadium	Malang
1994–95 Premier Division	30 April 1995	Persebaya	3–2	Arema	Gelora 10 November Stadium	Surabaya
1995–96 Premier Division	1995	Persebaya	3–0	Arema	Gelora 10 November Stadium	Surabaya
1995–96 Premier Division	1996	Arema	3–0	Persebaya	Gajayana Stadium	Malang
1996–97 Premier Division	19 February 1997	Arema	1–1	Persebaya	Gajayana Stadium	Malang
1996–97 Premier Division	26 March 1997	Persebaya	6–1	Arema	Gelora 10 November Stadium	Surabaya
1997–98 Premier Division	16 November 1997	Persebaya	0–0	Arema	Gelora 10 November Stadium	Surabaya
1997–98 Premier Division	12 April 1998	Arema	0–0	Persebaya	Gajayana Stadium	Malang
1999–2000 Premier Division	19 March 2000	Persebaya	1–0	Arema	Gelora 10 November Stadium	Surabaya
1999–2000 Premier Division	10 May 2000	Arema	1–0	Persebaya	Gajayana Stadium	Malang
2001 Premier Division	18 January 2001	Persebaya	1–0	Arema	Gelora 10 November Stadium	Surabaya
2001 Premier Division	18 July 2001	Arema	1–0	Persebaya	Gajayana Stadium	Malang
2002 East Java Governor Cup	22 December 2002 (Note: Group A piala gubernur Jatim 2002: Persebaya kalahkan Arema 2-1. Archived 18 June 2019 at the Wayback Machine. vamosarema.com. Accessed date 30/09/2019)	Arema	1–2	Persebaya	Gelora Delta Stadium	Sidoarjo
2006 Copa Indonesia	1 September 2006	Arema	1–0	Persebaya	Kanjuruhan Stadium	Malang
2006 Copa Indonesia	4 September 2006	Persebaya	0–0	Arema	Gelora 10 November Stadium	Surabaya
2007 Premier Division	13 February 2007	Arema	1–0	Persebaya	Kanjuruhan Stadium	Malang
2007 Premier Division	30 December 2007	Persebaya	1–1	Arema	Gelora 10 November Stadium	Surabaya
2009–10 Indonesia Super League	16 January 2010	Persebaya	2–0	Arema	Gelora 10 November Stadium	Surabaya
2009–10 Indonesia Super League	21 February 2010	Arema	1–0	Persebaya	Kanjuruhan Stadium	Malang
2018 East Kalimantan Governor Cup	2 March 2018	Persebaya	0–2	Arema	Palaran Stadium	Samarinda
2018 Liga 1	6 May 2018	Persebaya	1–0	Arema	Gelora Bung Tomo Stadium	Surabaya
2018 Liga 1	6 October 2018	Arema	1–0	Persebaya	Kanjuruhan Stadium	Malang
2019 Indonesia President's Cup finals	9 April 2019	Persebaya	2–2	Arema	Gelora Bung Tomo Stadium	Surabaya
2019 Indonesia President's Cup finals	12 April 2019	Arema	2–0	Persebaya	Kanjuruhan Stadium	Malang
2019 Liga 1	15 August 2019	Arema	4–0	Persebaya	Kanjuruhan Stadium	Malang
2019 Liga 1	12 December 2019	Persebaya	4–1	Arema	Batakan Stadium (Note: Persebaya hosted Arema at Batakan because Gelora Bung Tomo did not receive a security permit from the police.)	Balikpapan
2020 East Java Governor Cup	18 February 2020	Persebaya	4–2	Arema	Gelora Supriyadi Stadium (Note: Organizers moved the venue initially from Kanjuruhan Stadium to neutral venue in Blitar.)	Blitar
2021–22 Liga 1	6 November 2021	Arema	2–2	Persebaya	Manahan Stadium	Surakarta
2021–22 Liga 1	23 February 2022	Persebaya	1–0	Arema	Kapten I Wayan Dipta Stadium	Gianyar
2022–23 Liga 1	1 October 2022	Arema	2–3	Persebaya	Kanjuruhan Stadium	Malang
2022–23 Liga 1	11 April 2023	Persebaya	1–0	Arema	PTIK Stadium (Note: Persebaya hosted Arema at the PTIK Stadium because Gelora Joko Samudro did not receive a security permit from the police.)	South Jakarta
2023–24 Liga 1	23 September 2023	Persebaya	3–1	Arema	Gelora Bung Tomo Stadium	Surabaya
2023–24 Liga 1	27 March 2024	Arema	0–1	Persebaya	Kapten I Wayan Dipta Stadium (Note: Arema hosted Persebaya at the Kapten I Wayan Dipta Stadium since their home stadium, Kanjuruhan Stadium, was closed, demolished, and rebuilt after the 2022 disaster.)	Gianyar
2024–25 Liga 1	7 December 2024	Persebaya	3–2	Arema	Gelora Bung Tomo Stadium	Surabaya
2024–25 Liga 1	28 April 2025	Arema	1–1	Persebaya	Kapten I Wayan Dipta Stadium	Gianyar
2025–26 Super League	22 November 2025	Persebaya	1–1	Arema	Gelora Bung Tomo Stadium	Surabaya
2025–26 Super League	28 April 2026	Arema	0–4	Persebaya	Kapten I Wayan Dipta Stadium (Note: Arema hosted Persebaya at the Kapten I Wayan Dipta Stadium because Kanjuruhan did not receive a security permit from the police.)	Gianyar
2026 Piala Presiden	4 August 2026	Persebaya	1–0	Arema	Kapten I Wayan Dipta Stadium	Gianyar
2026–27 Super League	29 November 2026	Arema		Persebaya	Kapten I Wayan Dipta Stadium (Note: Arema hosted Persebaya at the Kapten I Wayan Dipta Stadium because Kanjuruhan did not receive a security permit from the police.)	Gianyar
2026–27 Super League	17 January 2027	Persebaya		Arema	Gelora Bung Tomo Stadium	Surabaya

== Players in both teams ==
Notes:

- Players in **bold** are still active.
- NOT COUNTING players from Arema IPL and Persebaya DU (PT. MMIB) due to ruling court decision stated both teams had no right to the trademark of Arema and Persebaya.

=== Arema then Persebaya ===
Player	Arema	Persebaya
(Indonesia) **Mikael Tata**	2023	2023–
(Indonesia) Rivaldi Bawuo	2018–2019	2021
(Mali) Makan Konaté	2018–2019	2020
(Indonesia) Reky Rahayu	2018	2018
(Indonesia) Mochammad Zaenuri	2017–2018	2022
(Indonesia) Nasir	2017–2019	2020–2021
(Indonesia) Raphael Maitimo	2016–2017	2018
(Indonesia) Ahmad Nufiandani	2015–2016	2022–2023
(Indonesia) Samsul Arif	2013–2015	2021–2022
(Cameroon) Alain N'Kong	2012	2013
(Indonesia) Talaohu Musafri	2010–2011	2013
(Indonesia) Jefri Prasetyo	2008–2009	2011–13
(Chile) Patricio Morales	2007–2009	2010
(Liberia) Anthony Ballah	2006–2007	2007–2009
(Indonesia) Deny Marcel	2005–2006	2009–2010
(Indonesia) Erol Iba	2004–2006	2010–2012
(Indonesia) Kurnia Sandy	2003–2006	2008–2009
(Indonesia) Khusnul Yuli	2001–2002, 2011–2012	2011
(Nigeria) Bob Bamidelle	2001–2002	2005
(Indonesia) Rustanto Sri Wahono	1998–1999, 2003	2008
(Indonesia) Muhammad Ikhsan	1998–1999	?
(Indonesia) Aji Santoso	1987–1995	1995–1999

=== Persebaya then Arema ===
Player	Persebaya	Arema
(Indonesia) **Hansamu Yama**	2019–2021	2026–
(Indonesia) Ricky Kayame	2017–2018	2019
(Indonesia) Rachmat Latief	2017	2019
(North Macedonia) Goran Ganchev	2013	2016
(Indonesia) Yohan Ibo	2011	2011–2012
(Indonesia) Syaifudin	2009–10	2010–2011
(Indonesia) Sutikno	2005	2011–2012
(Indonesia) Arif Ariyanto	2005–2011	2011–2012
(Indonesia) Ranu Tri Sasongko	2004–2006	2008–2009
(Indonesia) Erik Setiawan	2003–2004	2008–2009
(Indonesia) Hendro Kartiko	2004–2005	2006–2008
(Indonesia) Gendut Doni	2004–2005	2005–2006
(Indonesia) Rahmat Affandi	2003–2004	2009–2010
(Indonesia) Hamka Hamzah	2002–2003	2015–2016, 2018–2019
(Indonesia) Suroso	2001	2007–2009, 2014–2015
(Indonesia) Aris Susanto	1996–1999	2001–2003
(Indonesia) Sutaji	1996–1997	2004–2008
(Indonesia) Harianto	1996	1999
(Indonesia) I Putu Gede	1994–1996, 2008	1999–2001, 2004–2006
(Indonesia) Muhammad Khoiful Ajid	1994–1996	1997–1999
(Indonesia) Ahmad Junaidi	1994–1995, 2002	2001
(Indonesia) Bambang HS	1993	1994–1996
(Indonesia) Bagong Iswahyudi	1992, 1994	1993
(Indonesia) Totok Anjik	1989	1992

=== Head coaches who coached for both clubs ===
Head coach	Arema	Persebaya
(Indonesia) Aji Santoso	2016–2017	2009, 2010–2011, 2019–2023
(Austria) Wolfgang Pikal	2011	2019

== Honours ==
Arema	Competition	Persebaya
Domestic
2	League competitions	6
1	First Division	3
4	Piala Presiden	1
2	Piala Indonesia	—
9	Aggregate	10

== See also ==
- List of association football club rivalries in Indonesia
