= Kanjuruhan Stadium disaster =

2022 association football match disaster

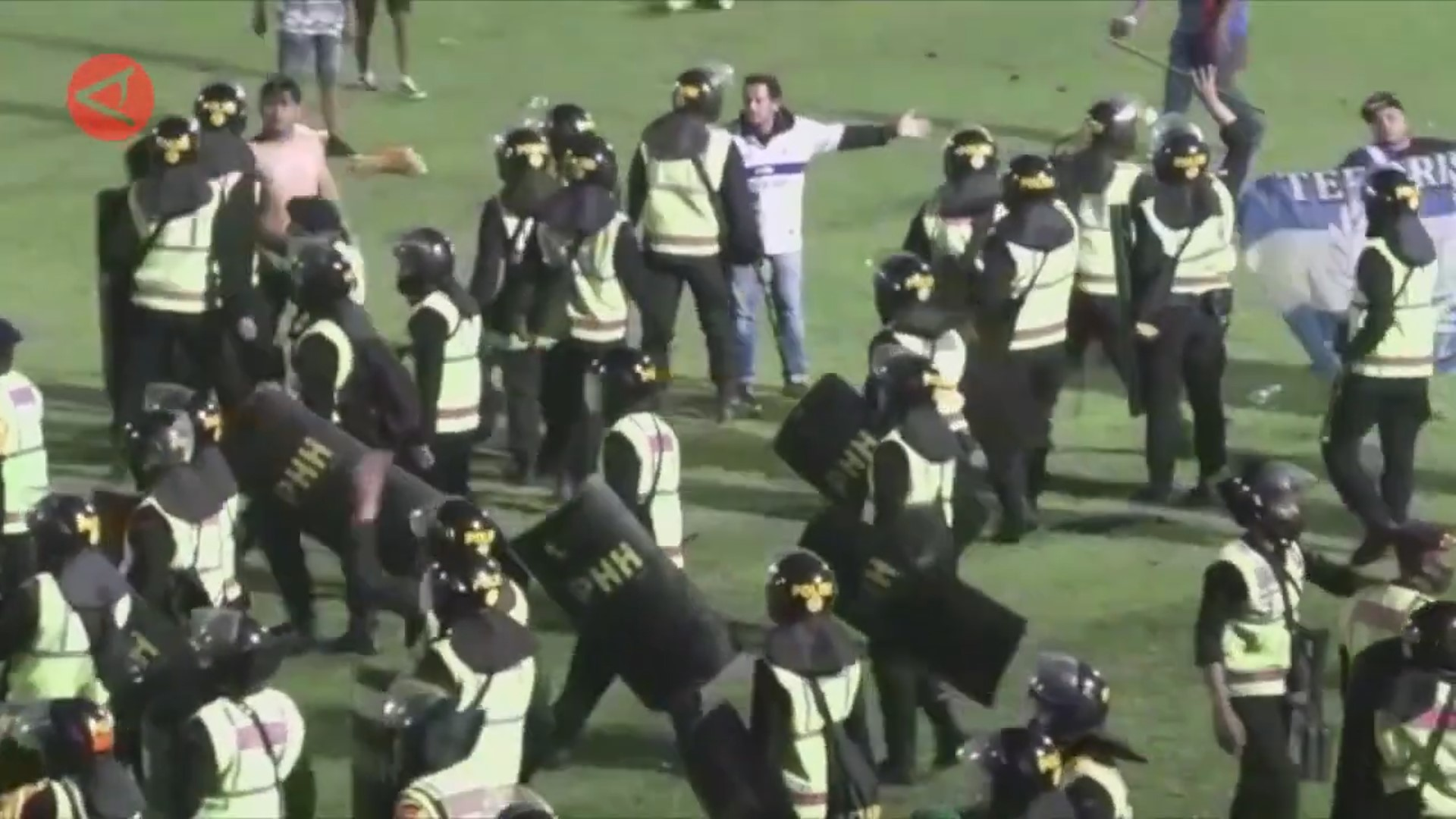
- Security officials and policemen forcing supporters off the ground
- Date: 1 October 2022
- Location: Kanjuruhan Stadium, Malang Regency, East Java, Indonesia; 08°09′01″S 112°34′26″E
- Type: crowd crush, football hooliganism, police misconduct, negligence
- Cause: Misuse of tear gas
- Deaths: 135
- Injuries: 583
- Accused: Ahmad Hadian Lukita; Abdul Haris; Suko Sutrisno; Wahyu Setyo Pranoto; Hasdarman; Bambang Sidik Achmadi
- Charges: Violation of the stadium's safety rules (Lukita, Haris and Sutrisno); Negligence of tear gas usage rule (Wahyu, Hasdarman and Achmadi)
- Verdict: See § Trial below

On 1 October 2022, a fatal crowd crush occurred following an association football match at Kanjuruhan Stadium in Malang Regency, East Java, Indonesia. Following a loss by home side Arema to their rivals Persebaya Surabaya, around 3,000 Arema supporters invaded the pitch. Police said that the rioting supporters attacked the players and the team officials. The police attempted to protect the players and stop the riot, but the crowds clashed with security forces. In response, riot police units deployed tear gas, which triggered a stampede of people in the stadium trying to escape the gas. A crush formed at one exit, resulting in fans being asphyxiated.

As of 24 October 2022, 135 people had lost their lives, and 583 others were injured as a result of the accident. This is the second deadliest stadium disaster in association football history, right behind the 1964 Estadio Nacional disaster in Peru which killed 328 people. It is also the second deadliest crowd crush of 2022 behind the Seoul Halloween crowd crush on 29 October that killed 159. It is therefore also the deadliest football-related disaster in both Asia and the Eastern Hemisphere.

On 6 October 2022, Indonesian police chief Police-General Listyo Sigit Prabowo announced that six different individuals and groups had been placed under suspicion: the director of the match organizer PT Liga Indonesia Baru (LIB), the Arema head of security officer, the members of the Arema match organizing committee for negligence, and three police officers for the use of tear gas.

On 16 January 2023, almost three months after the disaster, the first trial over events related to the Kanjuruhan disaster was held in Surabaya, East Java.

Six people were prosecuted. Three defendants received prison sentences, while one was released due to insufficient evidence. Two police officers who were initially acquitted were later sentenced by the Indonesian Supreme Court on 23 August 2023.

== Background ==
Football hooliganism has had a long history in Indonesia, with at least 95 football-related deaths between 2005 and 2018. Several teams' fan clubs have so-called "commanders", and riot police units are present at many matches, with flares often being used to disperse rioting crowds invading the pitch. In 2018, riots at Kanjuruhan following a match between Malang's Arema and Persib Bandung resulted in a fatality after riot police employed tear gas to disperse crowds.

Although FIFA regulation 19b states that tear gas should not be used in stadiums by pitchside stewards or police, Indonesian police riot units do make use of it to secure football matches. FIFA regulations are optional when an association or confederation arranges an event under its own competition regulations. The FIFA regulations therefore only serve as guidelines in those cases. (Note: FIFA regulations 1 through 3 state when the regulations should apply.)

Arema and Persebaya Surabaya, longstanding rival clubs at the Super East Java Derby, were scheduled to play a Liga 1 regular season match at Malang's 42,000-capacity Kanjuruhan Stadium on 1 October. Due to security concerns, police had requested that the match be held earlier in the afternoon at 15:30 WIB (08:30 UTC) instead of at 20:00 (13:00 UTC), and that only 38,000 people be allowed in the stadium. However, that request was not met by Liga 1 officials and match organisers, and 42,000 tickets were printed. Nevertheless, following police advice, Persebaya supporters – known as Bonek – received no tickets to the match.

The Malang Police Chief had held a phone conversation with the Director of Operations of LIB, Sujarno, who said the match still had to be held at night.

== Disaster ==
Tear gas projectile and smoke bombs position that shot in the night of the disaster.

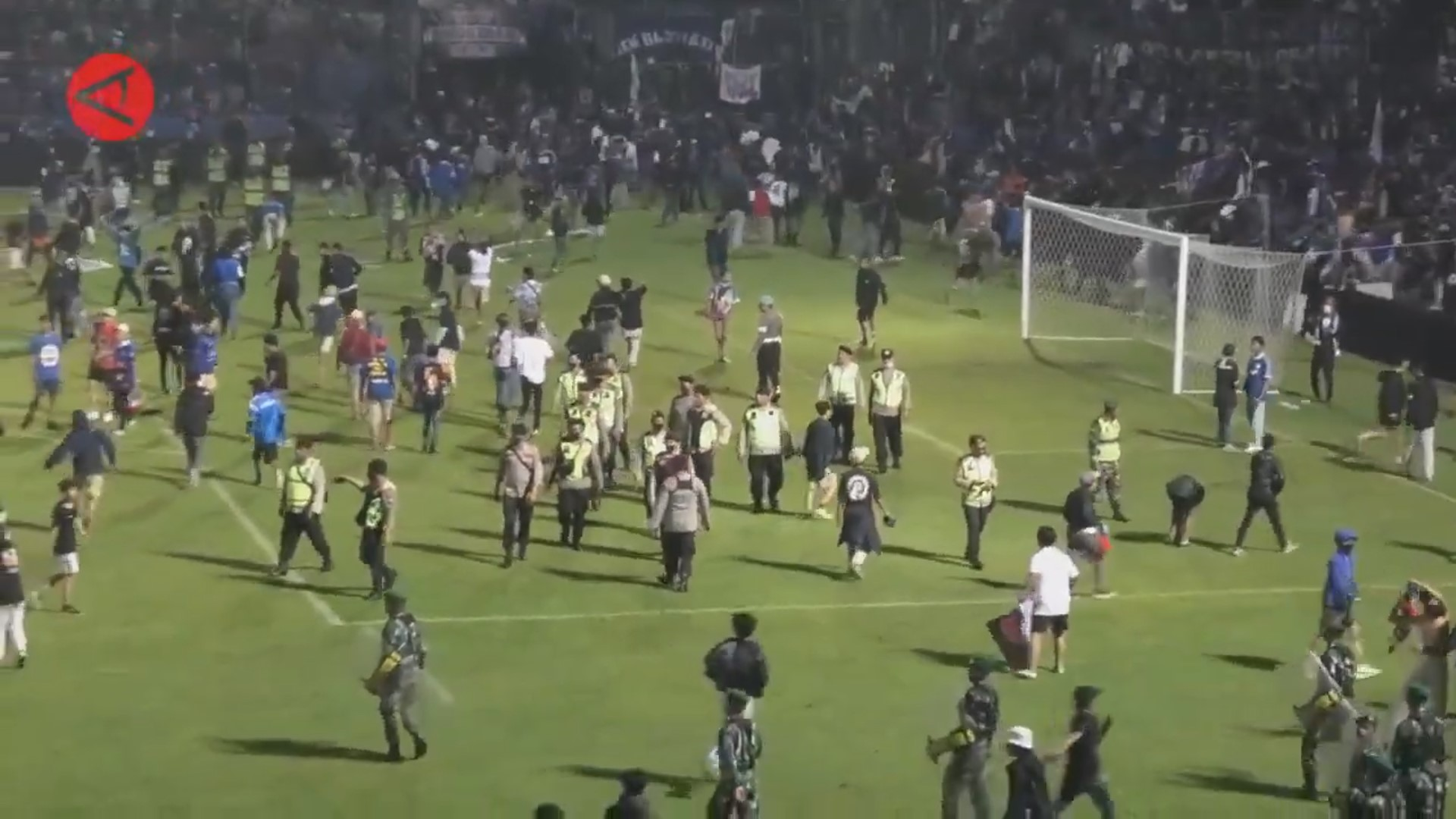
The moment before tear gas was fired into the crowd

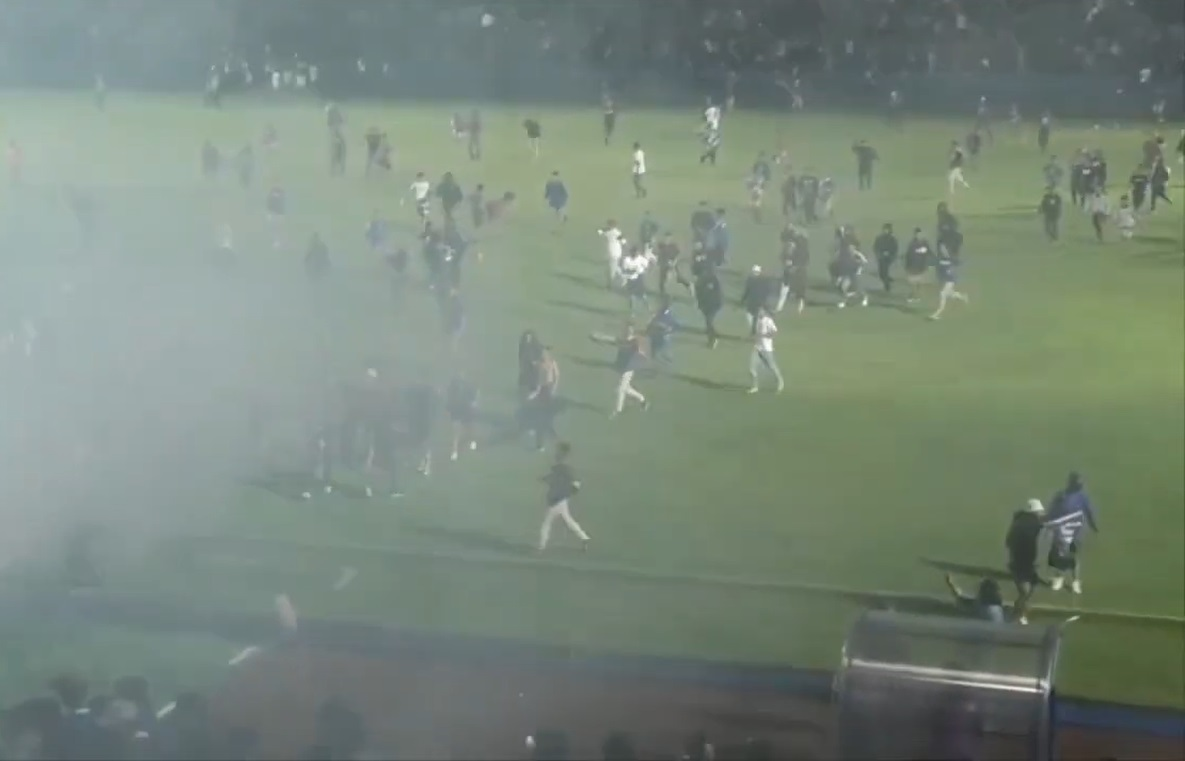
The moment tear gas was fired into the crowd, leading to a crush

Throughout the match itself, the security situation was smooth and without major incidents. Following the end of the match, in which Persebaya defeated Arema 3–2 – Persebaya's first ever win away at Arema – four spectators from stands 9 and 10 entered the field to provide encouragement to Arema players after their defeat. According to a witness, they were chased by the police, who pulled off their shirts and beat them; this triggered other supporters to enter the field area.

Approximately 3,000 supporters of Arema, nicknamed Aremania, invaded the pitch. The first group of spectators to invade the pitch came from stand 12. They scattered around, looking for their team's players and officials, and demanding their explanation of the defeat "after 23 years of undefeated home matches" against its rival Persebaya.

Security officials and police tried to divert more Aremania away from the pitch, but to no avail, forcing the Indonesian Army (TNI-AD) and Mobile Brigade Corps' Anti Riot Unit (PHH) to be called in to assist with the dispersal of the angry supporters. Aremania then proceeded to throw objects, damage police vehicles and start fires in the stadium, forcing Persebaya's players to rush for cover inside locker rooms, and subsequently be kept in police armoured personnel carriers for an hour before they could leave the stadium.

After failed "preventive measures", the police began using tear gas in an attempt to disperse the rioters on the pitch. Initially, the police fired tear gas towards stand 12, followed by stands 10, 11, and 14, and finally the south and north stands. This affected both the Aremania invading the pitch and other people there, causing Aremania in the south stand to run for the single exit point (gates 12–14) to avoid the tear gas. All gates were locked except gate 14, with most victims later found at gates 13 and 14, resulting in a crowd crush and the asphyxiation of many people. Tear gas was also deployed outside the stadium. Listyo claimed a total of 11 shots of tear gas were fired (7 to the south, 1 to the north and 3 onto the pitch), while The Washington Post reported that police fired at least 40 rounds of tear gas at the crowd within 10 minutes. The police said that ten police vehicles and three private vehicles were destroyed by the Aremania.

In the immediate aftermath of the riot, the players' lobby and changing rooms were used as makeshift evacuation posts, with Arema players and officials helping to evacuate victims still in the stadium. The victims were taken to hospitals by ambulances and Indonesian Army trucks. Many died on the way to or during treatment.

== Casualties ==
On 5 October 2022, the Indonesian National Police confirmed 131 deaths from this disaster. This echoed the previous report of 131 deaths from the Malang Regency Office of Health. Meanwhile, 133 deaths were reported by the Postmortem Crisis Center Post, established by the government of Malang Regency. Aremania disputed the official numbers, alleging that more than 200 people may have perished, as the bodies of some of those who died were immediately returned to their families instead of being transported to hospitals. Thirty-nine children aged 3 to 17 are also included in the death toll. The number was expected to increase as some of the treated victims were "deteriorating". As of 18 October 2022, the reported number of casualties was 583 injured and 133 killed. The 135th victim died on 24 October 2022.

The municipal government of Malang paid for the medical treatment of the victims. Kepanjen Regional Hospital and Wava Hospital were reported to be full of disaster victims, leading to some being sent to other hospitals around the city.

The governor of East Java, Khofifah Indar Parawansa, announced that the government of East Java would provide financial compensation to the victims' families. Each next-of-kin of the deceased would receive Rp 10 million (USD 699), while the wounded victims would receive Rp 5 million (USD 349) each. On 4 October 2022, Widodo announced the provision of additional financial compensation in the amount of Rp 50 million (USD 3495) from the central government to each deceased's next-of-kin.

The disaster is the second deadliest in the history of association football worldwide, after the 1964 Estadio Nacional disaster in Peru, which killed 328 people.

=== Ages and genders ===
Of those who died, 38 were aged under 17. The youngest who died was 3 years old and the oldest was 45 years old.

Age range in 2022	Total
0–9	1
10–19	71
20–29	50
30–39	9
40–49	4
Total	135

Gender	Total
Male	93
Female	42
Total	135

== Aftermath ==
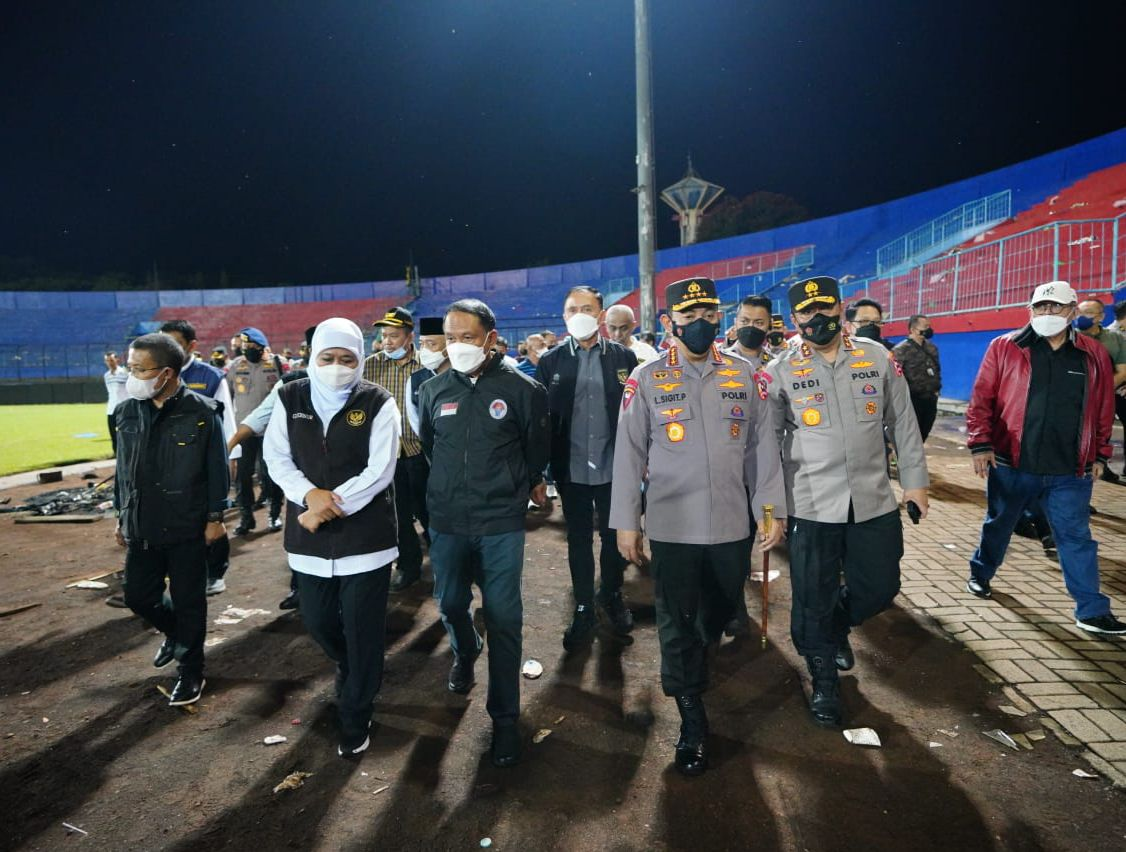
Chief of the Indonesian National Police Listyo Sigit Prabowo and East Java governor Khofifah Indar Parawansa at Kanjuruhan Stadium after the disaster.

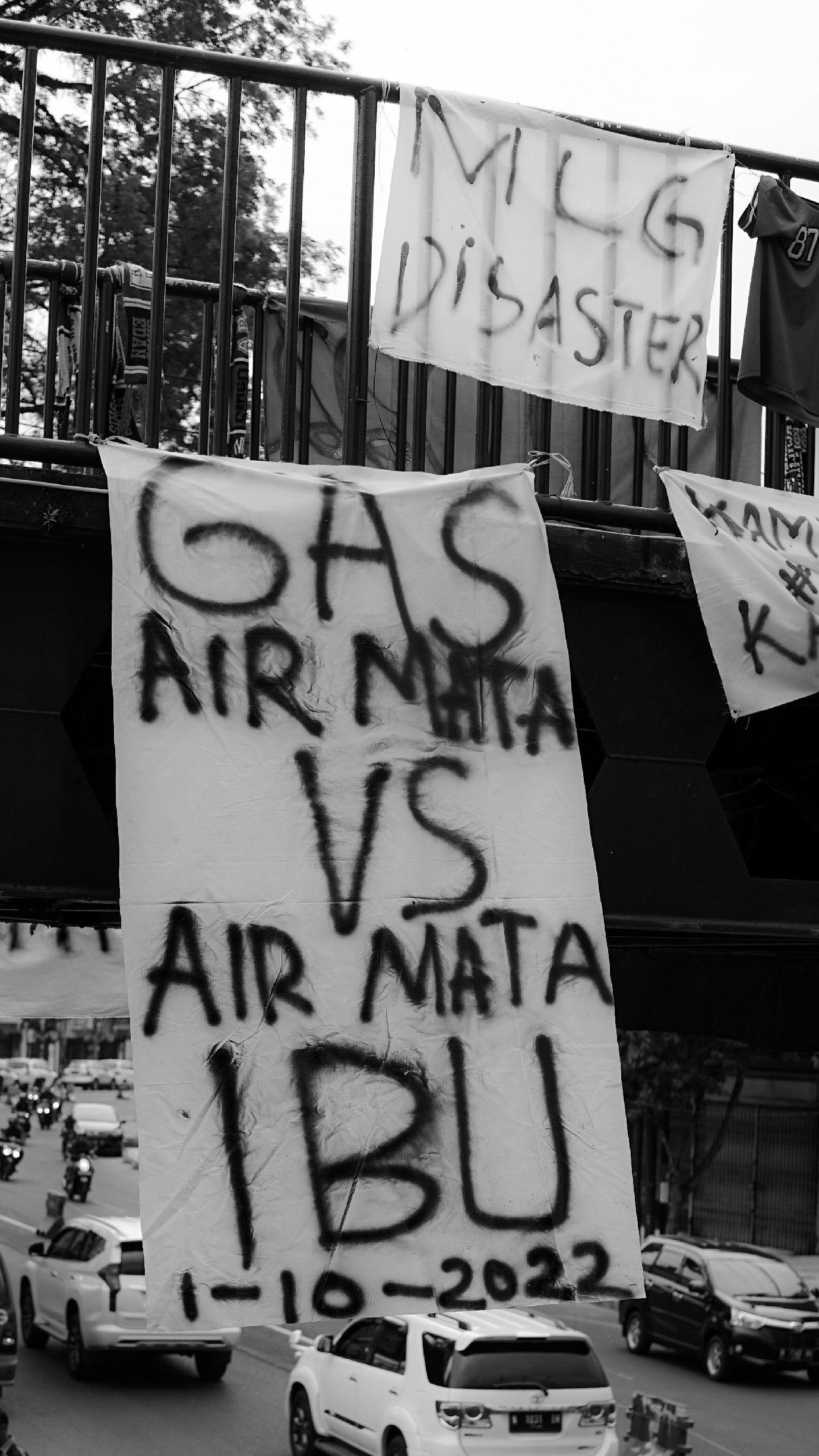
Banner ("TEAR GAS VS A MOTHER'S TEARS") in Malang after the disaster

As a result of the incident, President Joko Widodo later instructed the association to suspend all Liga 1 matches until a full "evaluation of improvement of security procedures" had been carried out, and this was followed by a joint fact-finding team deciding that all football leagues matches (Liga 1, Liga 2 and Liga 3) were temporarily suspended until the President said it could be normalised. The Indonesian Football Association (PSSI) apologised for the incident and announced a ban on home matches for Arema for the rest of the season. PSSI also stated that the decision by PT Liga Indonesia Baru, the organiser, to hold the match had been agreed to by other stakeholders of Indonesian football. In addition, Widodo also ordered all Liga 1, 2 and 3 stadiums to be fully audited by Minister of Public Works and Public Housing (PUPR) Basuki Hadimuljono.

On 3 October 2022, two days after the incident, the Head of Indonesian police Listyo Sigit Prabowo removed the Head of Police of Malang, Police Adjunct Chief Commissioner Ferli Hidayat, from his duties. Nine officers from East Java Mobile Brigade Corps were also removed.

Also on 3 October 2022, PSSI announced that the 2023 AFC U-17 Asian Cup qualification group B matches, which was held in Indonesia, would be played behind closed doors starting that night.

On 4 October 2022, a police officer was held in custody for 21 days for making defamatory tweets about the incident using the official Twitter account of Bantul's Srandakan police in the Special Region of Yogyakarta. He responded to criticism of the police with "Die!", "Who are you defending?" and "I salute the soldiers! Exterminate!".

After the incident, a video showing Indonesian soldiers beating and kicking Arema supporters surfaced. Commander of the Indonesian National Armed Forces Andika Perkasa promised that the act would not be considered self-defence, and the soldiers involved would be charged under criminal law.

After his meeting with FIFA President Gianni Infantino on 18 October 2022, Widodo issued orders to deactivate Kanjuruhan Stadium, demolish it and rebuild it according to FIFA standards.

On 5 December 2022, the imposed suspension of Liga 1 was lifted and competition resumed, with all remaining matches of the Liga 1 2022–23 first round (game weeks 12 until 17) being held behind closed doors.

Rebuilding of Kanjuruhan Stadium was completed on 21 January 2025. The process cost Rp 350 billion, making the new Kanjuruhan Stadium the most expensive stadium ever built in Indonesia. Minister of Public Works Dody Hanggodo expected the stadium to be strong enough for 30–40 years.

== Legal ==
Following the incident, there were calls from the Institute for Security and Strategic Studies (ISESS), an Indonesian defence and security think tank, and the Indonesian Police Watch (IPW) to dismiss the Malang police chief, Adjunct Chief Commissioner Ferli Hidayat. ISESS also demanded the dismissal of the East Java police chief Inspector General Nico Afinta, while IPW requested Afinta to bring the organisers of the match to trial.

The PSSI Disciplinary Commission imposed a lifetime ban on football activities on the chairman of the Arema match organising committee, Abdul Haris, and the Arema head of security officer, Suko Sutrisno. In addition, Arema was subjected to a Rp 250 million (US$16,000) fine, and prohibited from holding home matches with spectators. Matches were to be played far from the Malang home base, up to 250 km (155.34 mi) from the location.

== Investigation ==
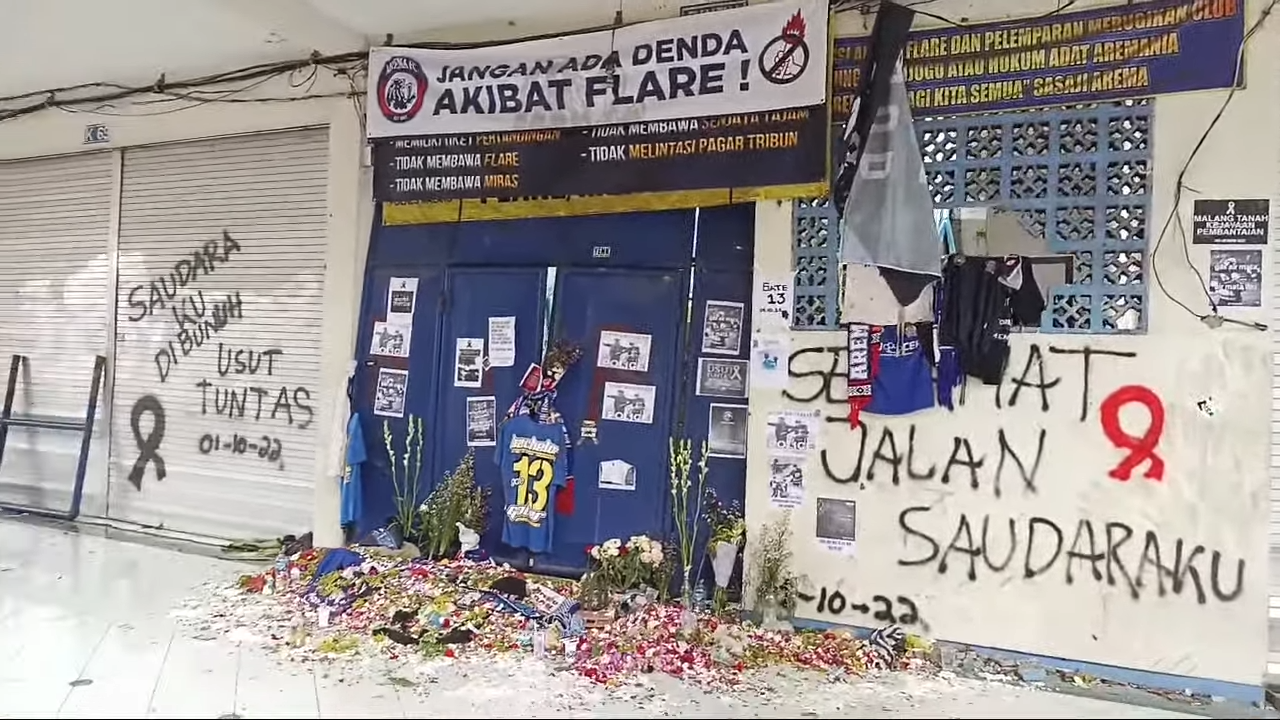
Gate 13 of Kanjuruhan Stadium on 5 October 2022, with memorial flowers and graffities, saying "Farewell, my brothers" (right) and "My brothers are killed, investigate thoroughly" (left)

The National Commission on Human Rights of Indonesia (KOMNAS HAM) announced plans to investigate the incident and the use of tear gas by police. Although FIFA's rules say that tear gas should not be used inside stadiums, the chief of regional police defended its use, citing the threats posed by the rioters to players and officials. However, the police also stated that they would evaluate the use of tear gas. Investigators are also examining the role of 18 police officers who operated the tear gas launcher. On 12 October 2022, KOMNAS HAM published their findings. On 14 October 2022, Narasi, an Indonesian independent news office, released a visual investigation detailing how the disaster unfolded, and highlighting the over-zealous use of tear gas. The account was compiled by Narasi from more than 80 amateur video recordings.

=== Police ===
Police investigated CCTV footage from six of the gates at the Kanjuruhan Stadium on 4 October. Gates 3 and 9 to 13 received special attention because the results of a preliminary analysis indicated that most of the victims were at those gates.

On 6 October 2022, Head of Indonesian police Listyo Sigit Prabowo announced six accused. Ahmad Hadi Lukita, the director of PT Liga Indonesia Baru, was charged for his negligence of stadium verification. Abdul Haris, Arema match organising committee chairman, was charged for not fulfilling the obligation of creating a set of safety rules or guidelines for spectators, as well as allowing ticket sales above stadium capacity. Suko Sutrisno, Arema head of security officer, was charged for not creating risk assessment document, and ordering gate stewards to leave stadium gates in the wake of the disaster. Three police officers were also charged: Wahyu Setyo Pranoto, Chief of Operations of Malang Regency Police; Hasdarman, Commander of 3rd Mobile Brigade Company of East Java Police, and Bambang Sidik Achmadi, Head of Prevention Unit of Malang Regency Police. Wahyu was charged for not prohibiting the use of tear gas, despite being aware of its prohibition by FIFA regulations, while Hasdarman and Achmadi were charged for ordering the use of tear gas by their subordinates. They were charged under Articles 359 and 360 of the Indonesian Criminal Code, as well as Article 103 juncto Article 52 of Indonesian Law No. 11/2022 on Sports.

On 10 October 2022, police admitted using expired tear gas. The fact-finding team submitted tear gas samples to National Research and Innovation Agency (BRIN) to analyze tear gas used by police to find possible toxins or other compounds in the tear gas, to determine the compounds causing injury or death of the victims. The tear gas samples originated from three separate Police stockpiles, from Brimob, Samapta Corps, and Malang Regency Police. Due to expired tear gas issue, the parents of two victims who died in the tragedy submitted a request for a re-autopsy on the bodies of their daughters, the father questioning the cause of the death of his two daughters.

On 15 November 2022, The East Java Police called Dr. Harun, a doctor from Wava Husada Hospital, Kepanjen, to present evidence against the suspects for violating the Indonesian Criminal Code articles 359 and 360, which deal with causing someone to suffer a serious injury or death caused by negligence, as well as Article 103 Paragraph 1 in conjunction with Article 52 Indonesian Law number 11/2022 on sports, which the charges were announced on 6 October. Until 15 November 2022, eleven doctors had already been questioned by the police.

=== Joint fact-finding team ===
On 3 October 2022, a joint independent fact-finding team, headed by the Coordinating Minister for Political, Legal, and Security Affairs Mahfud MD and Minister of Youth and Sports Zainudin Amali, was formed. No members of the Football Association of Indonesia (PSSI) joined the fact-finding team.

On 14 October 2022, the fact-finding team submitted a 124-page final report on the investigation to the president. While the full report was classified at that time, a summary and excerpt of the report was made available. The report put blames six parties involved in the incident: PSSI, LIB, match organizing committee, match security officers, the Police and Indonesian Army, and Arema supporters. From the involved parties, PSSI was blamed by the fact-finding team as major cause of the incident. The fact-finding team assessed that there were eight occurrences of PSSI misconduct, and that the PSSI chairman and executive committee members should resign over the Kanjuruhan disaster. On the other hand, PSSI refused to do the joint fact-finding team recommendation for PSSI to reshuffle the management through the Extraordinary Congress (KLB). PSSI claimed those were recommendations only. On 28 October 2022, PSSI executive commissioners announced that they would hold an extraordinary congress, after club representatives and members of PSSI invoked Article 34 of the PSSI Statute.

At the time of the fact-finding team announced the final report, BRIN had not yet finished analysis of the tear gas samples and was still assessing the toxicity and performing complete toxin profiling. Nonetheless, the BRIN report produced and later submitted as addendum of the fact-finding team's final report, the fact-finding team insisting that the high concentration of the tear gas was the main cause of the injury and death. On 21 October 2022, the tear gas laboratory analysis results were submitted to TGIPF by BRIN. However, TGIPF through Mahfud MD was hesitant to publish the findings to public. According to Mahfud, TGIPF came to the conclusion that the root cause of the panic that resulted in the deaths of hundreds of people was tear gas. Due to delays in the report's release, Aremania held a protest on 27 October 2022 demanded many things including the release of the BRIN report. On 15 November 2022, TGIPF released a statement that the BRIN report was reserved for investigative and prosecutorial purposes. The report was also submitted for the case submission; thus, the release of the report to the public is unlikely.

The fact-finding team also found CCTV footage at Kanjuruhan Stadium which was thought to be deleted, indicating a possible cover-up attempt. The footage came from the main lobby and parking area with a duration of 3 hours 21 minutes.

The declassified, 164-page final full report of TGIPF eventually released to public sometime later in late October 2022, although the extent of the redaction, information addition, and difference between the 124-page version of TGIPF report submitted to the president and that 164-page version which available to public, if any, are unknown.

=== Autopsies ===
On 5 November 2022, an independent team from the Indonesian Forensic Doctors Association performed autopsies on the bodies of two disaster victims after they were postponed. The victim's family said that the police had intimidated them. Devi Athok, the father of two exhumed victims, also reported being threatened at gunpoint by an unidentified person after having been repeatedly visited by police officers at his home in the days prior. The exhumation of two females, aged 16 and 13, took place at the Sukolilo, Wajak public cemetery.

On 30 November 2022, Indonesian Forensic Doctors Association announced the conclusion of the autopsies in Airlangga University. They stated that the victims' lungs did not contain any tear gas residue. Instead, the two victims' deaths were due to bleeding and fractures of the rib and chest. They also stated that the corpse had decomposed when they took the samples. The victim's lawyer claims that when the victims were found in the disaster, they had blackened faces, foam flowing from their mouths, and were dripping urine.

== Trial ==
The first trial of the disaster was held on 16 January 2023. All the trial procedures were held in Surabaya, East Java, including the reconstruction, which was held on 19 October 2022. The trial was led by judge Abu Achmad Sidqi Amsya. It was held behind closed doors and was not livestreamed, although the media crews were able to enter the courtroom, which was under security procedure.

The trial, initially, was to be held in Malang, in accordance with the jurisdiction of the disaster. However, the Regional Leaders' Coordination Forum of Malang (Forkopimda Malang; consisting of regional leaders from Malang Raya) submitted a request to relocate the trial to Surabaya for security reasons. The Supreme Court, as a judicial body, approved the request.

During the trial of five individuals who were charged, members of Brimob attempted to disrupt the trial. Video footage circulating on social media depicted these officers, identifiable by their distinctive navy-blue berets, mocking and taunting the prosecutors as they arrived on 14 February 2023 for the ongoing trial at the Kanjuruhan Stadium in Malang.

=== Result ===
Only six people faced prosecution for their part in the disaster, even though the government through TGIPF had promised to name more defendants as the investigation carried on. Despite the fact that independent sources (including Narasi, Antara News, and The Washington Post) reported that a large number of tear gas projectiles were discovered in the stands, a presiding judge in the court case stated that "the wind is guilty for the fatalities" in the disaster. The two police officials, Wahyu Setyo Pranoto and Bambang Sidik Achmadi, were acquitted for this reason.

On 23 August 2023, the Indonesian Supreme Court annulled the initial verdicts of the two police officers, Bambang Sidik Achmadi and Wahyu Setyo Pranoto. They were then sentenced to prison; Achmadi for two years, and Pranoto for two years and six months.

Name	Position	Charge	Date of verdict	Sentence	Note	Ref.
Ahmad Hadian Lukita	Director of PT.LIB	–	–	Released	Released on 23 December 2022 due to incomplete case file and mens rea not yet found.	
Suko Sutrisno	Head of security officer of Arema	6 years and 8 months	9 March 2023	1 year	Violating Article 359 and Article 360 paragraph 1 and 2 of the Criminal Code (KUHP) and Article 1 paragraph 1 Juncto Article 52 of Law Number 11 of 2022 concerning Sports.	
Abdul Haris	Match organising committee chairman of Arema	6 years and 8 months	9 March 2023	1 year and 6 months	Violating Article 359 and Article 360 paragraph 1 and 2 of the Criminal Code (KUHP) and Article 1 paragraph 1 Juncto Article 52 of Law Number 11 of 2022 concerning Sports.	
Hasdarman	Commander of 3rd Mobile Brigade Company of East Java	3 years	16 March 2023	1 year and 6 months	Violating Article 359, Article 360 paragraph 1, and Article 360 paragraph 2 of the Criminal Code (KUHP), namely as a result of his negligence causing the death of another person or injuring others.	
Wahyu Setyo Pranoto	Chief of Operations of Malang Regency Police	3 years	23 August 2023	2 years and 6 months (formerly Acquitted)	Violating Article 359, Article 360 paragraph 1, and Article 360 paragraph 2 of the Criminal Code (KUHP), namely as a result of his negligence causing the death of another person or injuring others.	
Bambang Sidik Achmadi	Head of Prevention Unit of Malang Regency Police	3 years	23 August 2023	2 years (formerly Acquitted)	Violating Article 359, Article 360 paragraph 1, and Article 360 paragraph 2 of the Criminal Code (KUHP), namely as a result of his negligence causing the death of another person or injuring others.	

=== Restitution ===
On 31 December 2024, following the verdict from the Surabaya District Court, the responsible party was ordered to pay restitution to 71 petitioners. The court set the restitution amount at IDR 1.02 billion, a significant reduction from the initial request of IDR 17.2 billion. In response to the ruling, the petitioners announced their intention to appeal the decision. Prior to this, the victims had already received financial assistance in the form of donations from Arema FC, as well as support from the central and regional governments through the KIS program.

== Reactions ==
Commission III of the People's Representative Council's deputy chairman, Ahmad Sahroni, condemned the actions of the officers throwing tear gas at the stands, which were filled with people. According to him, the use of tear gas in stadiums is prohibited by FIFA and is not included in the standard operating procedures for securing football matches. Sahroni asked the National Police Chief General Listyo Sigit Prabowo to take firm action against the officers responsible for the use of tear gas.

=== FIFA ===
On 6 October 2022, Widodo sent a letter to FIFA President Gianni Infantino through Minister of State Owned Enterprises Erick Thohir. FIFA replied to the letter on 7 October 2022 as follows:

1. No sanction given to Indonesia and Indonesia National Team from FIFA.
2. Collaboration between Indonesian government, FIFA, AFC and PSSI will be formed with goals of:
  1. Establishing stadium security standards for all football stadiums in Indonesia.
  2. Formulating security protocols and procedures performed by the police to meet international standards.
  3. Fostering discussions between Indonesian football clubs and supporter representatives to collect input and joint commitments.
  4. Re-assessing football game schedules and performing risk–benefit analysis.
  5. Inviting experts for guidance and advising purposes.
3. Establishment of a special FIFA office in Indonesia

On 18 October 2022, Infantino met Widodo in Istana Merdeka. In the meeting, the Indonesian government and FIFA agreed to:

1. Fix the Indonesian football system, infrastructures, and fan culture.
2. Ensure all aspects in Indonesian football competitions will be run under FIFA standards.
3. Ensure all aspects in match safety will be run under FIFA standards.
4. Re-assess all stadiums worthiness and applying up to date technologies.
5. Comprehensively transform Indonesian football standards in accordance with FIFA standards. Assessments of all Indonesian football stakeholders will be jointly performed by the Indonesian government and FIFA.
6. Run the 2023 FIFA U-20 World Cup (later removed to Argentina due to protests against Israel's participation), with Indonesia as the host of the tournament as planned and scheduled. The tournament will be jointly managed by the Indonesian government and FIFA.

FIFA Office for Indonesia opened on 10 November 2023.

=== International ===
- Several football leagues hold a minute's silence to express sympathy for the victims of the tragedy. (Note: LaLiga of Spain, Eredivisie of the Netherlands, A-League of Australia, and J.League of Japan.)
- UEFA hold a moment of silence before every UEFA Champions League, UEFA Europa League, and UEFA Europa Conference League matchday three games.
- Malaysian Minister of Youth and Sports Ahmad Faizal Azumu conveyed condolences to family members of victims of the tragedy. He also added that Malaysia is ready to provide any assistance if required by the Indonesian government.
- (Philippines) Philippine president Bongbong Marcos expressed his heartfelt condolences to Indonesian people and Indonesian government in aftermath of the disaster.
- (United Kingdom) King Charles III and Queen Camilla expressed their heartfelt condolences to Indonesian people and Indonesian government in aftermath of the disaster.
- (Germany) German president Frank-Walter Steinmeier wrote a letter to President Joko Widodo expressing his sympathy to the victims of the disaster. Chancellor Olaf Scholz also expressed his condolences to the victims.
- (Malaysia) Johor Darul Ta'zim's ultra group, Boys of Straits, showed solidarity across nation borders by ordering and sending a funeral flower wreath directly to the Kanjuruhan Stadium. The condolence message on the wreath translated to English as "We are with you, in our deepest sympathy & may we stand strong together in facing this.".
- (Germany) In the UEFA Champions League match between Bayern Munich and Viktoria Plzeň, Bayern's supporters showed a banner that reads "more than 100 people killed by the police! Remember the dead of Kanjuruhan!"
- (Germany) In the Bundesliga match against Bayern Munich at the Signal Iduna Park, Borussia Dortmund's supporters displayed a solidarity banner written in Indonesian that reads "Malang Kamu Tidak Sendirian. Justice for Kanjuruhan" (transl. "Malang You Are Not Alone. Justice for Kanjuruhan").
- (Spain) In the La Liga match between Rayo Vallecano and Elche CF, Rayo Vallecano's prominent ultra group, Bukaneros, displayed a massive banner that reads "No son muertes, son asesinatos" (transl. "They are not deaths, they are murders") to demand justice for the victims and condemn the actions of the Indonesian police.
- (Scotland) Prior to their UEFA Champions League fixture against RB Leipzig, Celtic observed a stadium-wide minute of silence in memory of the victims, while their ultra group, Green Brigade, later displayed a solidarity banner at Celtic Park reading "Justice for Kanjuruhan".
- Many European football clubs expressed condolences, including Chelsea, Liverpool, Manchester United, Manchester City, and Barcelona.
- Borussia Dortmund's tour to Indonesia was cancelled due to government regulations to improve safety measures.

=== Police ===
On 28 October 2022, to provide security for the organizing of sporting events after the Kanjuruhan Stadium disaster, the police issued Chief on the National Police Decree No. 10/2022. The new regulation becomes effective on 4 November 2022. In the new regulation, uses of offensive weapons such as tear gases, smoke grenades, guns in securing the sporting events are forbidden, and police will no longer permitted to carry such weapons in sporting events. As replacement, the police only authorized the use of hand-to-hand martial arts and defensive tools such as riot shields and batons for securing the sporting events. To deter any further pitch invasion events, defensive barricades will be installed in the stadium to separate the team supporters and pitch in all stadiums in Indonesia. The defensive barricades will also be erected in other designated protected areas inside and outside the stadium to ensure the safety of the team supporters, spectators, players, and officials.

=== Abandoned leagues ===
Several Provincial Liga 3 (third division; regional leagues) were annulled as a result of noncompliance of National Police Decree No. 10/2022. (Note: See Police reaction section to read more.) Per 1 January 2023, East Java and Yogyakarta 2022–2023 Liga 3 season were abandoned.

Following PSSI's exco meeting which took place on 12 January 2023, the rest of 2022–23 season of Liga 2 were abandoned. In general, the requests of the clubs, inadequate infrastructure, and police permits prevented the competition from being restarted. There were three statement points announced by PSSI that led to the abandonment of the league:

1. The majority of Liga 2 clubs (20 of 28 clubs) filed demands to have the competition discontinued. This happened because Liga 2 was very difficult to be restarted due to 2023 U-20 World Cup beginning on 20 May 2023, and there was no alignment in the idea of maintaining the competition between clubs and operators.
2. Recommendations by the Indonesian football transformation team in regard to the infrastructure and facilities that did not meet standards after the Kanjuruhan tragedy.
3. In accordance with National Police Decree No. 10/2022, the organizer of a match was required to submit new permits at a specific time and obtain security assistance.

The 2022–23 Liga 1 season continued without relegations because the second tier was abandoned. PSSI also forced PT Liga Indonesia Baru (leagues' operator) to establish new league operator for Liga 2.

=== PSSI ===
In response of the disaster, extraordinary congress is finally invoked and scheduled to be held 16 February 2023. The extraordinary congress will replace the President of PSSI, Vice Presidents of PSSI, and PSSI Executive Committees.

In compliance with TGIPF recommendation, the President of PSSI, Mochamad Iriawan, confirmed that he will step down from PSSI leadership. He re-affirmed his decision on 15 January 2023. He said that he will no longer pursuing the bid for extending his PSSI presidency, claimed that he was "enough" and he admitted his responsibility for the disaster.

== Commemoration and memorials ==
Every year on 1 October, Malang locals and Aremania held memorial event to remember the event in Kanjuruhan. On the 9 November 2022, 40 days after the disaster, 135 half-masted Indonesian flags were erected as symbol of the victims.

There are three memorials built to commemorate the victim of the disaster. Originally, these memorials management and operation were to be under the victim relief organization, Yayasan Keadilan Tragedi Kanjuruhan (Justice for Kanjuruhan Stadium Disaster Foundation), but later the surviving victims and their families eventually chose Malang Regency Department of Youth and Sports to manage and operate these memorials, while keeping the financial rights, museum collection curation, rights for organizing memorial events to the relief foundation for the victims and theirs surviving family.

- Gate 13, the fatal iron gate due to its locked state at the time of police tear gas shooting resulted in crush and body pile-up is preserved within the stadium. The gate located at the south part of the stadium. The gate and stairway leading to the tribune made eternally locked and inaccessible in perpetual. The gate itself adorned by flowers, pamphlets, and personal effects of unknown victims of the disaster on the gate pieces. The gate structure was initially demolished by Ministry of Public Works and Housing contractors during the stadium demolition, before restored to its original ruined state at its original place, and become the sole original part of Kanjuruhan stadium that survived the demolition. The Gate 13 is consecrated by local Nadhlatul Ulama ulamas on the 3rd death anniversary of the disaster on 1 October 2025.
- Kanjuruhan Disaster Museum, a small museum exhibiting several personal effects of the victims, located near the Gate 13, side-by-side.
- Kanjuruhan Disaster Monument, a larger memorial listed names of 135 victims, and features diorama and memorial placard depicting chaotic events on the day of disaster. It located at the southern outer side of the stadium, not far from the Southern Gate. The monument was built by Ministry of Public Works and Housing and Indonesian state-owned construction companies Waskita Karya and Brantas Abipraya.

== In popular culture ==
=== Symbolisms ===
On social media, the number 135 or 135+ is often used as a symbol to commemorate the disaster. It serves as a shorthand for remembrance, solidarity, and calls for justice. Since 2023, number 135 written in Javanese numerology ꧑꧓꧕ became a permanent feature in Arema F.C.'s football jersey.

=== Drama ===
- In 2023, Message of Kanjuruhan, a film based on the disaster, directed by Oy Abadi and Alfie Awra was released.

== See also ==
- List of human stampedes and crushes:
  - Heysel Stadium disaster – a similar disaster in Belgium in 1985 also caused by rioting football fans.
  - Hillsborough disaster – a similar disaster at a football game in the United Kingdom in 1989 due to police failings rather than supporters' behavior.
  - PhilSports Stadium stampede – a similar disaster in Pasig, Metro Manila, Philippines in 2006 that involved the participation of first anniversary episode of ABS-CBN's former noontime show Wowowee.
  - Port Said Stadium riot – a similar disaster in Egypt in 2012 that involved the use of tear gas toward rioting supporters.
  - Seoul Halloween crowd crush – a similar disaster in Itaewon, Seoul, South Korea that occurred exactly four weeks later.
  - San Salvador crowd crush – a similar disaster in El Salvador that took place seven months later.
  - Nzérékoré stampede – a similar disaster in Guinea in December 2024 also caused by rioting football fans.
