= Aremania =

Supporters of an Indonesian football club, Arema FC

- Established: 1994
- Type: Supporters' group
- Team: Arema
- Location: Malang, East Java
- Key people: Yuli Sompel; Sukarno (Cak No); El Kepet; Ovan Tobing
- Colours: Blue, Red

Aremania are a group of supporters of the Indonesian association football club, Arema FC. They are known for their fanaticism, and their rivalry against Bonek, ultras of Persebaya.

== History ==
The group came to prominence in the late 1990s, and Aremania name appears as a supporting community name Arema. They do not have a structure and a leader by following a term, "No leader, just together" since its inception. Before Aremania was established, Arema (as a club) founded its own fans association named Arema Fans Club, but it folded due to lack of support from the people.

Since then they have been praised for their input into Indonesian football and supporter culture and in 2006, they were awarded "The Best Indonesian Football Supporters" by Football Association of Indonesia.

Despite the Arema's dualism in 2012, the community name (Aremania) never split to every side. Every 11 August, the club's anniversary, they gather at one point to celebrate together. In the private music community, every side's bands are often found performing on the same stage. In the 35th Arema anniversary event which was held at Kayutangan, Malang on 10 August 2022, bands that affiliated to both sides performed in front of thousand fans, being the first public collaborated music scene from both sides.

In 2014 the ultras during a game against Persib Bandung made a tifo consisting of a banner 15000m² large, considered to be one of the biggest ever made.

=== 2022 Kanjuruhan Stadium disaster ===
On 1 October 2022, at least 135 people, including 2 police officers, were killed from fractures, trauma to the head and neck, and asphyxia, and more than 500 others injured after tear gases deployed in to the stand and caused stampede in the stadium. Following the disaster, Arema was officially banned from using Kanjuruhan Stadium in home matches and cannot be attended by spectators until the end of 2022–23 season. Aremania has consistently staged protests since mid-October, included silence demonstration, "rally of justice", demonstration in front of the courthouse, and blocking the street, demanding for a faster decision to the investigation into the disaster.

== Rivalries ==
Aremania have a very strong rivalry with supporters of Persebaya Surabaya, who are known as Bonek and the games between the two sides, known as the Super East Java Derby, often escalates into violence.

== Songs ==
Aremania has been known to sing many songs before even the game begins. These songs have been recorded by the local rappers and musicians. These songs are:

- "Salam Satu Jiwa" by APA Rapper
- "Arema Juara" by ARRO
- "Selalu Setia" by Arema Voice
- "We are the Champions" by Arema Voice
- "Untuk-mu Arema" by B-Qini
- "Arema Milik Kita Semua" by Djanoer
- "Singo Edan" by Peace Maker
- "Aremania" by The Klokid
- "Cinta Bola Cinta Arema" by Tropical Forest
- "Sang Juara" by Vitruvian
- "Tanah Kejayaan" by Corner Side

== See also ==
- Arema–Persib Bandung rivalry
