= Mauro Zijlstra =

Indonesian footballer (born 2004)

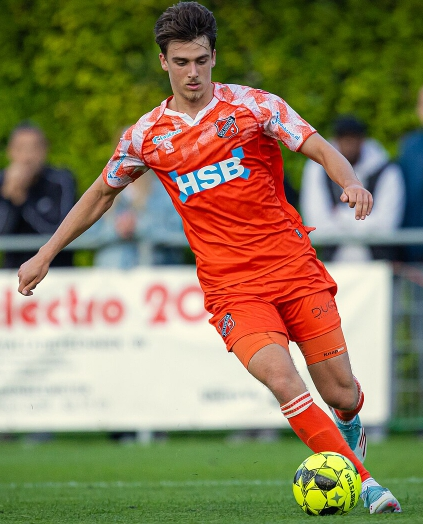
- Zijlstra playing for Volendam in 2025

Personal information
- Full name: Mauro Nils Zijlstra
- Date of birth: 9 November 2004 (age 22)
- Place of birth: Zaandam, Netherlands
- Height: 1.89 m (6 ft 2 in)
- Position: Forward

Team information
- Current team: Arema (on loan from Persija Jakarta)
- Number: 9

Youth career
- –2019: AZ
- 2019–2023: AFC
- 2023–2024: NEC
- 2024–2026: Volendam

Senior career*
| Years | Team | Apps | (Gls) |
| 2024–2026 | Volendam | 6 | (0) |
| 2026– | Persija Jakarta | 4 | (0) |
| 2026– | → Arema (loan) | 8 | (2) |

International career^{‡}
| 2025– | Indonesia U23 | 4 | (1) |
| 2025– | Indonesia | 5 | (1) |
Medal record
Men's football
Representing Indonesia
FIFA Series
| Runner-up | 2026 Indonesia |
- * Club domestic league appearances and goals as of 20 November 2026 ‡ National team caps and goals as of 5 June 2026

Mauro Nils Zijlstra (born 9 November 2004) is a professional footballer who plays as a forward for Super League club Arema, on loan from Persija Jakarta. Born in the Netherlands, he represents the Indonesia national team.

== Club career ==
=== Volendam ===
Zijlstra joined FC Volendam from NEC Nijmegen in June 2024.

On 19 December 2024, he made his first team debut as a substitute in a 2–0 loss against Rijnsburgse Boys in the KNVB Beker. Approximately one month later, Zijlstra made his league debut in a match against FC Eindhoven.

=== Persija Jakarta ===
On 4 February 2026, Zijlstra officially joined Persija Jakarta on a two and a half-year contract.

==== Loan to Arema ====
On 22 August 2026, Zijlstra was loaned to fellow Super League club, Arema for the 2026–27 season. On 4 September 2026, Ziljstra made his debut for the club as a substitute playing in the 81th minute, and scored his first professional goal, three minutes later in a 4–0 victory against Isenmulang Kalteng in the opening of the season.

== International career ==
In July 2025, it was announced that Zijlstra had decided to represent Indonesia at international level. On 3 September 2025, he received a call-up from Indonesia national team for two friendlies against Chinese Taipei and Lebanon. On 5 September 2025, he made his debut in a friendlies match against Chinese Taipei in a 6–0 win.

On 27 March 2026, Zijlstra scored his first international goal against Saint Kitts and Nevis in the 2026 FIFA Series at the Gelora Bung Karno Stadium.

== Personal life ==
Born in the Netherlands, Zijlstra is of Indonesian descent.

On 29 August 2025, Zijlstra officially obtained Indonesian citizenship.

== Career statistics ==
=== Club ===
As of match played 20 November 2026

Appearances and goals by club, season and competition
| Club | Season | League | | | National cup | | League cup | | Other | | Total | |
| Club | Season | Division | Apps | Goals | Apps | Goals | Apps | Goals | Apps | Goals | Apps | Goals |
|---|---|---|---|---|---|---|---|---|---|---|---|---|
| Volendam | 2024–25 | Eerste Divisie | 6 | 0 | 1 | 0 | – | | 0 | 0 | 7 | 0 |
| Volendam | 2025–26 | Eredivisie | 0 | 0 | 0 | 0 | – | | 0 | 0 | 0 | 0 |
| Persija Jakarta | 2025–26 | Super League | 4 | 0 | – | | – | | 0 | 0 | 4 | 0 |
| Arema (loan) | 2026–27 | Super League | 8 | 2 | – | | 1 | 0 | 0 | 0 | 9 | 2 |
| Career total | | | 18 | 2 | 0 | 0 | 1 | 0 | 0 | 0 | 20 | 2 |

=== International ===
As of match played 5 June 2026

Appearances and goals by national team and year
| National team | Year | Apps | Goals |
|---|---|---|---|
| Indonesia | 2025 | 3 | 0 |
| Indonesia | 2026 | 2 | 1 |
| Total | | 5 | 1 |

As of match played 27 March 2026
Scores and results list Indonesia's goal tally first, score column indicates score after each Zijlstra goal.

List of international goals scored by Mauro Zijlstra
| No. | Date | Venue | Cap | Opponent | Score | Result | Competition |
|---|---|---|---|---|---|---|---|
| 1 | 27 March 2026 | Gelora Bung Karno Stadium, Jakarta, Indonesia | 4 | Saint Kitts and Nevis | 4–0 | 4–0 | 2026 FIFA Series |

== Honours ==
Volendam

- Eerste Divisie: 2024–25

Indonesia

- FIFA Series runner-up: 2026

== See also ==
- List of Indonesia international footballers born outside Indonesia
