= Erlangga Setyo =

Indonesian footballer

Personal information
- Full name: Erlangga Setyo Dwi Saputra
- Date of birth: 16 April 2003 (age 23)
- Place of birth: Jember, Indonesia
- Height: 1.95 m (6 ft 5 in)
- Position: Goalkeeper

Team information
- Current team: Arema
- Number: 16

Youth career
- 2014–2019: SSB Anak Manja Jember
- 2019–2021: Persib Bandung
- 2020–2020: → Garuda Select (loan)
- 2021–2023: Persis Solo

Senior career*
Years	Team	Apps	(Gls)
2023–2026	Persis Solo	0	(0)
2023–2026	→ PSPS Pekanbaru (loan)	25	(0)
2026–	Arema	0	(0)

International career^{‡}
2020–2022	Indonesia U20	2	(0)
2025	Indonesia U23	1	(0)
- * Club domestic league appearances and goals as of 19 April 2026 ‡ National team caps and goals as of 13 October 2025

Erlangga Setyo Dwi Saputra (born 16 April 2003) is an Indonesian professional footballer who plays as a goalkeeper for Super League club Arema.

== International career ==
In August 2020, Erlangga was included on Indonesia national under-19 football team 30-man list for Training Center in Croatia.

On 25 November 2024, Erlangga received a called-up to the preliminary squad to the Indonesia national team for the 2024 ASEAN Championship.
