= Samuel Otusanya =

Nigerian footballer (born 2004)

Personal information
- Full name: Oluwasegun Samuel Otusanya
- Date of birth: 27 June 2004 (age 22)
- Place of birth: Lagos, Nigeria
- Height: 1.87 m (6 ft 2 in)
- Position: Forward

Team information
- Current team: Arema
- Number: 34

Youth career
- Stars Builders Academy

Senior career*
Years	Team	Apps	(Gls)
2023	Haugesund	3	(0)
2024	América-PE	16	(3)
2025	→ Náutico (loan)	10	(2)
2025–2026	Criciúma	7	(0)
2025–2026	→ Náutico (loan)	12	(3)
2026	→ Athletic Club (loan)	6	(0)
2026–	Arema	8	(2)
- * Club domestic league appearances and goals as of 20 November 2026

Oluwasegun Samuel Otusanya (born 27 June 2004) is a Nigerian professional footballer who plays as a centre-forward for Super League club Arema.

== Club career ==
=== Early career and Brazil ===
Otusanya began his youth career with the Stars Builders Academy in Nigeria. In March 2023, he moved to Europe and joined the Norwegian Eliteserien club Haugesund, where he made three league appearances.

In Brazil, he signed for América-PE where he scored three goals in 16 appearances. In January 2025, he was presented at Náutico on loan.

In April 2025, Otusanya signed with Campeonato Brasileiro Série B club Criciúma. On 18 April 2025, Otusanya made his Série B debut for the team as a substitute in a 4–0 win over Athletic Club. In August 2025, he returned to Náutico on loan to prepare for the 2025 Série C.

In March 2026, he was loaned out to fellow Brazilian side Athletic Club until the end of the regional season, where he made six league appearances.

=== Arema ===
In September 2026, Otusanya moved to Southeast Asia and signed for Indonesian Super League club Arema on a free transfer from Criciúma to fill the slot left by Joel Vinicius. His arrival alongside Hanif Sjahbandi concluded Arema's transfer window for the early 2026–27 season. He made his official debut on 18 September 2026 in a 1–1 draw against Persik Kediri. On 10 October 2026, he netted his first goal for the club in a 2–2 home draw against Bhayangkara Presisi.
