= Wolfgang Pikal =

Austrian football manager (born 1967)

Personal information
- Date of birth: 1 November 1967 (age 58)
- Place of birth: Vienna, Austria

Managerial career
- Years: Team
- 2010–2011: Indonesia (assistant)
- 2011–2012: Arema Malang
- 2013–2014: Indonesia (assistant)
- 2016: Indonesia (assistant)
- 2019: Persebaya Surabaya (caretaker)
- 2023: Perak FC (assistant)

Wolfgang Pikal (born 1 November 1967) is an Austrian football manager.

In his career as a football player, Pikal played for SR Donaufeld. At the age of 22, he suffered a broken ankle and decided to retire as a player.

Since 1999, Pikal trained a number of clubs in Bali. He then studied coaching at several European clubs and now has a 20 certificate coaching, In Bali Pikal handles the Academy of Real Madrid Asia junior team.
