= Sinyo Aliandoe =

Indonesian footballer (1940–2015)

Sebastian Sinyo Aliandoe (1 July 1940 – 18 November 2015) was an Indonesian football player and manager.

== Career ==
Aliandoe managed the Indonesia national team from 1982 to 1983.
