= M. Basri =

Indonesian footballer and manager (1942–2026)

Muhammad Basri (5 October 1942 – 23 July 2026) was an Indonesian football player and manager, best known for managing Persiba Bantul.

Basri managed the Indonesia national team. He died on 23 July 2026, at the age of 83.
