= MV (footballer) =

Brazilian footballer (born 1998)

Personal information
- Full name: Marcos Vinicius Silvestre Gaspar
- Date of birth: 10 July 1998 (age 28)
- Place of birth: Rio de Janeiro, Brazil
- Height: 1.72 m (5 ft 8 in)
- Position: Forward

Team information
- Current team: Arema
- Number: 98

Youth career
- 2013–2019: Resende

Senior career*
Years	Team	Apps	(Gls)
2019	Paraíba do Sul	13	(9)
2020	Pérolas Negras	20	(7)
2021–2026	Volta Redonda	126	(21)
2022	→ Pérolas Negras (loan)	26	(6)
2023	→ Ypiranga-RS (loan)	33	(2)
2026–	Arema	10	(2)
- * Club domestic league appearances and goals as of 20 November 2026

Marcos Vinicius Silvestre Gaspar (born 10 July 1998), better known by the nickname MV, is a Brazilian professional footballer who plays as a forward for Super League club Arema.

== Career ==
Revealed in the youth sectors of Resende FC, MV began his professional career at Paraíba do Sul. The following year, he gained prominence returning to the city of Resende, this time at Academia Pérolas Negras, where he won the Série B (third tier) in Rio de Janeiro. MV was signed by Volta Redonda in 2021, and was later loaned again to Pérolas Negras in 2022 and to Ypiranga de Erechim in 2023.

On 16 August 2025, MV reached the milestone of 100 matches for Volta Redonda.

Following his extensive tenure in Brazil, MV sought a new challenge abroad, on 17 July 2026, he officially transferred to Indonesian side Arema for the 2026–27 season.

== Honours ==
Pérolas Negras

- Campeonato Carioca Série B: 2020

Volta Redonda

- Campeonato Carioca Série A2: 2022
- Campeonato Brasileiro Série C: 2024
