= Diego Landis =

Brazilian footballer (born 1998)

Personal information
- Full name: Diego Luiz Landis
- Date of birth: 3 May 1998 (age 28)
- Place of birth: Paranavaí, Brazil
- Height: 1.95 m (6 ft 5 in)
- Position: Centre back

Team information
- Current team: Arema
- Number: 3

Youth career
- –2014: Paranavaí
- 2015: São Paulo
- 2016–2017: Desportivo Brasil

Senior career*
Years	Team	Apps	(Gls)
2017–2021	Desportivo Brasil	43	(3)
2018–2019	→ Porto B (loan)	19	(2)
2021–2022	Mirassol	10	(0)
2022	→ Villa Nova (loan)	10	(0)
2022–2024	Chiangrai United	47	(1)
2024–2025	Khon Kaen United	25	(1)
2025–2026	Terengganu	15	(1)
2026–	Arema	10	(1)
- * Club domestic league appearances and goals as of 20 November 2026

Diego Luiz Landis (born 3 May 1998) is a Brazilian professional footballer who plays as a centre back for Super League club Arema.

== Career statistics ==
=== Club ===
As of 26 May 2024.

Appearances and goals by club, season and competition
Club	Season	League			State League		National Cup		League Cup		Other		Total	
Club	Season	Division	Apps	Goals	Apps	Goals	Apps	Goals	Apps	Goals	Apps	Goals	Apps	Goals
Desportivo Brasil	2017	Paulista A3	—		15	0	—		—		19 (Note: Appearances in the Copa Paulista)	3	34	3
Desportivo Brasil	2018	Paulista A3	—		21	3	—		—		—		21	3
Desportivo Brasil	2020	Paulista A3	—		3	0	—		—		—		3	0
Desportivo Brasil	2021	Paulista A3	—		1	0	—		—		—		1	0
Desportivo Brasil	Total		—		40	3	—		—		19	3	59	6
Porto B (loan)	2018–19	LigaPro	11	0	—		—		—		—		11	0
Porto B (loan)	2019–20	LigaPro	4	1	—		—		—		—		4	1
Porto B (loan)	Total		15	1	—		—		—		—		15	1
Mirassol	2020	Série C	7	0	—		—		—		—		7	0
Mirassol	2021	Série C	3	0	—		—		—		—		3	0
Mirassol	Total		10	0	—		—		—		—		10	0
Villa Nova (loan)	2022	Mineiro	—		10	0	—		—		—		10	0
Chiangrai United	2022–23	Thai League 1	21	0	—		2	0	1	0	—		24	0
Chiangrai United	2023–24	Thai League 1	26	1	—		2	0	3	0	—		31	1
Chiangrai United	Total		47	1	—		4	0	4	0	—		55	1
Career total			72	2	50	3	4	0	4	0	19	3	149	8
