= Syahrul Trisna =

Indonesian footballer

Personal information
- Full name: Syahrul Trisna Fadillah
- Date of birth: 26 November 1995 (age 30)
- Place of birth: Sleman, Indonesia
- Height: 1.85 m (6 ft 1 in)
- Position: Goalkeeper

Team information
- Current team: Arema
- Number: 26

Youth career
- 2016: PS TNI

Senior career*
Years	Team	Apps	(Gls)
2017	PSS Sleman	16	(0)
2018–2024	Persikabo 1973	74	(0)
2024–2025	PSIS Semarang	15	(0)
2025–2026	Borneo Samarinda	0	(0)
2026–	Arema	2	(0)

International career
2021–2024	Indonesia	8	(0)
Medal record
Men's football
Representing Indonesia
AFF Championship
Runner-up	2020 Singapore	Team
- * Club domestic league appearances and goals as of 31 October 2026

Syahrul Trisna Fadillah (born 26 November 1995) is an Indonesian professional footballer who plays as a goalkeeper for Super League club Arema.

== Club career ==
=== PS TNI/Persikabo 1973 ===
He was signed for PS TNI to play in Liga 1 in the 2018 season. Syahrul made his league debut on 26 March 2018 in a match against Persib Bandung at the Gelora Bandung Lautan Api Stadium, Bandung.

=== PSIS Semarang ===
On 11 July 2024, PSIS Semarang brought in Syahrul ahead of the start of the 2024–25 Liga 1 competition. Syahrul at PSIS will be under contract for the next season. On 9 June 2025, Syahrul officially left PSIS Semarang.

== International career ==
In November 2021, Indonesian coach, Shin Tae-yong sent Syahrul his first call up to the full national side, for the friendly matches in Turkey against Afghanistan and Myanmar. In December 2021, he was named in Indonesian's squad for the 2020 AFF Championship in Singapore. On 9 December 2021, Syahrul earned his first cap, starting in a 2020 AFF Championship against Cambodia at Bishan Stadium, Bishan, Singapore. He stopped a penalty from Timor-Leste international Mouzinho in his second international senior team match in a 4–1 win against Timor-Leste on 27 January 2022.

In September 2022, Syahrul was part of the starting eleven in a friendly match against Curaçao which resulted in a 2–1 win. In November 2022, Syahrul received a call-up from the national team for a training camp, in preparation for the 2022 AFF Championship. On 2 January 2023, Syahrul substituted Nadeo Argawinata who got an injury at the 24th minute and made his second appearance at the AFF Championship.

== Career statistics ==
=== Club ===
As of 31 October 2026

Club	Season	League			Cup (Note: Includes Piala Indonesia.)		League cup (Note: Includes I-League Cup.)		Continental		Other		Total	
Club	Season	Division	Apps	Goals	Apps	Goals	Apps	Goals	Apps	Goals	Apps	Goals	Apps	Goals
PSS Sleman	2016	ISC B	1	0	0	0	0	0	–		0	0	1	0
PSS Sleman	2017	Liga 2	15	0	0	0	0	0	–		0	0	15	0
PSS Sleman	Total		16	0	0	0	0	0	–		0	0	16	0
Persikabo 1973	2018	Liga 1	17	0	0	0	0	0	–		0	0	17	0
Persikabo 1973	2019	Liga 1	4	0	0	0	0	0	–		0	0	4	0
Persikabo 1973	2020	Liga 1	1	0	0	0	0	0	–		0	0	1	0
Persikabo 1973	2021–22	Liga 1	23	0	0	0	0	0	–		3 (Note: Appearances in Menpora Cup.)	0	26	0
Persikabo 1973	2022–23	Liga 1	18	0	0	0	0	0	–		0	0	18	0
Persikabo 1973	2023–24	Liga 1	11	0	0	0	0	0	–		0	0	11	0
Persikabo 1973	Total		74	0	0	0	0	0	–		3	0	77	0
PSIS Semarang	2024–25	Liga 1	15	0	0	0	0	0	–		0	0	15	0
Borneo Samarinda	2025–26	Super League	0	0	0	0	0	0	–		0	0	0	0
Arema	2026–27	Super League	2	0	0	0	0	0	–		2 (Note: Appearances in Piala Presiden.)	0	4	0
Career total			107	0	0	0	0	0	0	0	5	0	112	0

=== International appearances ===
As of match played 2 January 2024

Appearances and goals by national team and year
National team	Year	Apps	Goals
Indonesia	2021	1	0
Indonesia	2022	2	0
Indonesia	2023	4	0
Indonesia	2024	1	0
Total		8	0

== Honours ==
PS TNI U-21

- Indonesia Soccer Championship U-21: 2016

Indonesia

- AFF Championship runner-up: 2020
