= 2025–26 Arema F.C. season =

Arema F.C.
2025–26 season
- CEO: Iwan Budianto
- Head coach: Marquinhos Santos
- Stadium: Kanjuruhan Stadium; Kapten I Wayan Dipta Stadium (only on 28 April 2026)
- Super League: 9th
- Top goalscorer: Dalberto (19)
- Highest home attendance: 10,314 (vs. Persija, 8 November 2025)
- Lowest home attendance: 405 (vs. Persita, 30 December 2025) (excluding matches played behind closed doors)
- Average home league attendance: 2,543

The 2025–26 Arema F.C. season is Arema's 36th competitive season. The club will compete in Super League (rebranded from Liga 1). Arema Football Club a professional football club based in Malang, East Java, Indonesia.

== Squad information ==
=== First team squad ===
Note: Flags indicate national team as defined under FIFA eligibility rules; some limited exceptions apply. Players may hold more than one non-FIFA nationality.

No.	Pos.	Nation	Player
2	DF	IDN	Rio Fahmi (on loan from Persija Jakarta)
4	DF	IDN	Leo Guntara
5	DF	BRA	Walisson Maia
6	MF	COL	Julián Guevara (vice-captain)
7	FW	BRA	Gabriel Silva
8	MF	IDN	Arkhan Fikri
9	FW	BRA	Joel Vinícius
10	MF	BRA	Valdeci
11	FW	IDN	Salim Tuharea
12	DF	IDN	Rifad Marasabessy
13	MF	IDN	Samuel Balinsa
14	MF	IDN	Jayus Hariono
15	FW	IDN	Fikri Arjidan
16	FW	IDN	Agusti Ardiansyah
17	FW	IDN	Dwiki Mardiyanto
18	GK	IDN	Gianluca Pandeynuwu (on loan from Persis Solo)
19	DF	IDN	Achmad Maulana
20	FW	IDN	Razzaa Fachrezi

No.	Pos.	Nation	Player
22	MF	IDN	Aswin
23	DF	IDN	Anwar Rifai
25	MF	BRA	Matheus Blade
27	FW	IDN	Dedik Setiawan
28	MF	BRA	Betinho
30	GK	IDN	Adi Satryo
31	GK	BRA	Lucas Frigeri
32	MF	BRA	Pablo Oliveira
41	FW	IDN	Dendi Santoso (vice-captain)
66	DF	IDN	Hansamu Yama (on loan from Persija Jakarta)
70	FW	IDN	Dimas Aryaguna
72	DF	IDN	Bayu Setiawan
77	MF	BRA	Gustavo França
87	DF	IDN	Johan Alfarizi (captain)
94	FW	BRA	Dalberto
95	GK	IDN	Andrian Casvari
96	DF	IDN	Iksan Lestaluhu

=== Other players under contract ===
Note: Flags indicate national team as defined under FIFA eligibility rules; some limited exceptions apply. Players may hold more than one non-FIFA nationality.

No.	Pos.	Nation	Player
26	DF	BRA	Luiz Gustavo

== Transfers ==
=== In ===
Date	Pos.	Name	From	Fee	Ref.
14 June 2025	GK	(Indonesia) Adi Satryo	(Indonesia) PSIS	Free	
16 June 2025	FW	(Indonesia) Dwiki Mardiyanto	(Indonesia) Deltras	Free	
16 June 2025	FW	(Indonesia) Razzaa Fachrezi	(Spain) Rayo Vallecano C	Free	
16 June 2025	FW	(Indonesia) Dimas Aryaguna	Youth sector	Promoted	
26 June 2025	FW	(Brazil) Paulinho Moccelin	(Brazil) Brusque	Free	
26 June 2025	MF	(Brazil) Valdeci	(Brazil) Itabaiana	Free	
30 June 2025	DF	(Brazil) Odivan Koerich	(Brazil) Náutico	Free	
1 July 2025	DF	(Brazil) Yann Motta	(Brazil) Corumbaense	Free	
21 July 2025	FW	(Argentina) Ian Puleio	(Montenegro) FK Dečić	Free	
1 August 2025	MF	(Brazil) Betinho	(Indonesia) PSS	Free	
4 August 2025	DF	(Brazil) Luiz Gustavo	(Brazil) Ituano	Free	
7 August 2025	FW	(Indonesia) Fikri Arjidan	(Indonesia) Persipal	Free	
8 August 2025	MF	(Brazil) Matheus Blade	(Brazil) Noroeste	Undisclosed	
27 August 2025	FW	(Indonesia) Agusti Ardiansyah	(Indonesia) Dewa United U16s	Free	
3 September 2025	DF	(Indonesia) Alfiansyah	(Indonesia) PSS	Free	
13 January 2026	FW	(Brazil) Gabriel Silva	(Malaysia) Terengganu	Free	
20 January 2026	MF	(Brazil) Gustavo França	(Indonesia) Persija	Free	
28 January 2026	FW	(Brazil) Joel Vinícius	(Indonesia) Borneo Samarinda	Undisclosed	
5 February 2026	DF	(Brazil) Walisson Maia	(Brazil) Vila Nova	Free	
7 February 2026	DF	(Indonesia) Leo Guntara	(Indonesia) Borneo Samarinda	Free	

=== Out ===
Date	Pos.	Name	To	Fee	Ref.
14 June 2025	DF	(Indonesia) Syaeful Anwar	(Indonesia) Kendal Tornado (Note: Joined on 24 January 2026.)	Free	
14 June 2025	MF	(Indonesia) Daffa Fahish	Free agent	Free	
14 June 2025	FW	(Indonesia) Flabio Soares	(Indonesia) Deltras (Note: Joined on 1 August 2025.)	Free	
14 June 2025	GK	(Indonesia) Dicki Agung	(Indonesia) Sumsel United (Note: Joined on 26 July 2025.)	Free	
23 June 2025	FW	(Australia) Charles Lokolingoy	(South Korea) Chungnam Asan (Note: Joined on 28 July 2025.)	Free	
30 June 2025	MF	(Indonesia) Kevin Armedyah	(Indonesia) Unaaha (Note: Joined on 12 December 2025.)	Free	
25 November 2025	FW	(Brazil) Paulinho Moccelin	(Brazil) Londrina (Note: Joined on 1 December 2025.)	Free	
28 December 2025	DF	(Indonesia) Brandon Scheunemann	(Indonesia) PSPS (Note: Joined on 3 January 2026.)	Free	
14 January 2026	DF	(Brazil) Yann Motta	Free agent	Free	
16 January 2026	FW	(Argentina) Ian Puleio	(North Macedonia) FK Vardar	Free	
4 February 2026	DF	(Brazil) Odivan Koerich	(Brazil) Metropolitano (Note: Joined on 28 March 2026.)	Free	

=== Loan In ===
Date from	Date to	Pos.	Name	From	Ref.
27 January 2026	End of season	GK	(Indonesia) Gianluca Pandeynuwu	(Indonesia) Persis	
31 January 2026	End of season	DF	(Indonesia) Rio Fahmi	(Indonesia) Persija	
31 January 2026	End of season	DF	(Indonesia) Hansamu Yama	(Indonesia) Persija	

=== Loan Out ===
Date from	Date to	Pos.	Name	To	Ref.
26 July 2025	End of season	DF	(Brazil) Thales Lira	(Indonesia) Persija	
25 August 2025	End of season	DF	(Indonesia) Achmad Figo	(Indonesia) Deltras	
25 August 2025	23 November 2025	DF	(Indonesia) Bayu Aji	(Indonesia) Deltras	
25 August 2025	End of season	FW	(Indonesia) Hamzah Titofani	(Indonesia) Deltras	
25 August 2025	End of season	MF	(Indonesia) Sulthon Fajar	(Indonesia) Deltras	
23 November 2025	End of season	DF	(Indonesia) Bayu Aji	(Indonesia) RANS Nusantara	
10 January 2026	End of season	FW	(Indonesia) Muhammad Rafli	(Indonesia) Deltras	
7 February 2026	End of season	DF	(Indonesia) Alfiansyah	(Indonesia) Sriwijaya	

== Pre-seasons and friendlies ==
=== Friendlies ===
Date	Opponents	H / A	Result F–A	Scorers	Attendance
21 June 2025	Arema U20s	N	8–0	Dedik (3) 11', 14', 24', Tuharea 21', Rafli 42', Fachrezi (2) 56', 81', Tito 79'	0
19 July 2025	RANS Nusantara	N	7–1	Valdeci 15', Dalberto (2) 20', 59', Dedik 56', Dwiki (2) 72', 82'	0
26 July 2025	Persija	A	0–3		

=== Piala Presiden ===
==== Group stage ====
Date	Opponents	H / A	Result F–A	Scorers	Attendance	Group position
8 July 2025	Liga Indonesia All-Stars	N	2–2	Tuharea 19', Dedik 65'	3,714	2nd
10 July 2025	Oxford United	N	0–4		9,137	3rd

Pos	Team	Pld	W	D	L	GF	GA	GD	Pts	Qualification
1	(England) Oxford United	2	2	0	0	10	3	+7	6	Advance to the Final
2	Liga Indonesia All-Stars	2	0	1	1	5	8	−3	1	Advance to the Third place play-off
3	(Indonesia) Arema	2	0	1	1	2	6	−4	1	

Source: Piala Presiden 2025
Rules for classification: Tiebreakers

== Competitions ==
=== Overview ===
Competition	First match	Last match	Starting round	Final position	Record							
Competition	First match	Last match	Starting round	Final position	Pld	W	D	L	GF	GA	GD	Win %
Super League	11 August 2025	22 May 2026	Matchday 1	9th	34	13	9	12	53	47	+6	38.24
Total					34	13	9	12	53	47	+6	38.24

Source: Competitions

=== Super League ===
==== Matches ====
Date	Opponents	H / A	Result F–A	Scorers	Attendance	League position
11 August 2025	PSBS	H	4–1	Dalberto (3) 17' (pen.), 68', 80', Valdeci 62'	2,336	2nd
16 August 2025	PSIM	A	1–1	Dalberto 41' (pen.)	8,618	3rd
22 August 2025	Bhayangkara Presisi	H	2–1	Dalberto (2) 39', 90+7' (pen.)	840	3rd
30 August 2025	Persijap	A	0–0		5,713	3rd
13 September 2025	Dewa United Banten	H	1–2	Dalberto 90+7'	819	3rd
22 September 2025	Persib	H	1–2	Blade 12'	5,400	8th
28 September 2025	Persis	A	2–2	Dalberto 78', Arkhan 88'	5,515	10th
19 October 2025	PSM	A	2–1	Valdeci 50', Arkhan 55'	1,786	6th
26 October 2025	Borneo Samarinda	H	1–3	Dalberto 90+7' (pen.)	805	9th
3 November 2025	Semen Padang	A	2–1	Valdeci 30', Dalberto 41'	5,384	8th
8 November 2025	Persija	H	1–2	Valdeci 12'	10,314	9th
22 November 2025	Persebaya	A	1–1	Dimov 63' (o.g.)	29,476	9th
29 November 2025	Malut United	A	1–1	Puleio 47'	1,560	10th
23 December 2025	Madura United	H	2–2	Iksan (2) 37', 60'	780	11th
30 December 2025 (Note: The Super League match home to Persita, originally scheduled for 5 October 2025, was postponed due to in preparation for the Indonesia national football team in fourth round of the 2026 FIFA World Cup qualification.)	Persita	H	0–1		405	11th
4 January 2026	Bali United	A	0–1		8,501	12th
11 January 2026	Persik	H	2–1	Supriadi 90+5' (o.g.), Puleio 90+8'	2,350	10th
26 January 2026	Dewa United Banten	A	0–2		924	11th
2 February 2026	Persijap	H	1–0	Hansamu 36'	1,068	11th
8 February 2026	Persija	A	2–0	Gabi (2) 82', 90+9'	56,989	9th
15 February 2026	Semen Padang	H	3–0	Vinícius (2) 29', 58', França 52'	2,223	8th
21 February 2026	Madura United	A	2–2	Dalberto 47', Vinícius 51'	1,169	9th
26 February 2026	Borneo Samarinda	A	1–3	Dalberto 64'	6,434	10th
6 March 2026	Bali United	H	3–4	Dalberto (2) 61', 78' (pen.), Arel 90+5' (o.g.)	4,125	11th
10 March 2026	Bhayangkara Presisi	A	1–2	Vinícius 45+1'	4,357	11th
3 April 2026	Malut United	H	1–1	Hansamu 26'	1,749	11th
10 April 2026	Persita	A	1–0	França 76'	1,313	11th
18 April 2026	Persis	H	2–0	Gabi (2) 16', 53'	2,096	10th
24 April 2026	Persib	A	0–0		29,814	10th
28 April 2026	Persebaya	H	0–4		0 (Note: Arema held home matches without spectators as did not receive a security permit from the police.)	10th
3 May 2026	Persik	A	2–3	Dalberto 86', Maia 90+9'	0	10th
9 May 2026	PSM	H	3–0	Dalberto 10' (pen.), Gabi 53', Vinícius 69'	1,433	10th
15 May 2026	PSBS	A	5–2	França 20', Vinícius (2) 40', 44', Dalberto (2) 41', 90+2' (pen.)	0	9th
22 May 2026	PSIM	H	3–1	Vinícius 2', Dalberto 48', Valdeci 88'	6,502	9th

==== League table ====
Pos	Team	Pld	W	D	L	GF	GA	GD	Pts
7	Dewa United Banten	34	16	5	13	44	37	+7	53 (Note: Head-to-head points: Bhayangkara Presisi 9, Malut United 6, Dewa United Banten 3.)
8	Bali United	34	14	9	11	57	48	+9	51
9	Arema	34	13	9	12	53	47	+6	48
10	Persita	34	13	6	15	38	37	+1	45 (Note: Head-to-head points: Persita 6, PSIM 0.)
11	PSIM	34	11	12	11	43	44	−1	45

Source: Super League 2025–26
Rules for classification: 1) Points; 2) Head-to-head points; 3) Head-to-head goal difference; 4) Head-to-head goals scored; 5) Goal difference; 6) Goals scored; 7) Fair-play points; 8) Draw.

== Statistics ==
=== Squad appearances and goals ===
No.	Pos	Nat	Player	Total		Super League	
No.	Pos	Nat	Player	Apps	Goals	Apps	Goals
Goalkeepers
18	GK	(Indonesia) IDN	Gianluca Pandeynuwu	2	0	2	0
30	GK	(Indonesia) IDN	Adi Satryo	14	0	13+1	0
31	GK	(Brazil) BRA	Lucas Frigeri	22	0	20+2	0
95	GK	(Indonesia) IDN	Andrian Casvari	0	0	0	0
Defenders
2	DF	(Indonesia) IDN	Rio Fahmi	15	0	15	0
4	DF	(Indonesia) IDN	Leo Guntara	9	0	2+7	0
5	DF	(Brazil) BRA	Walisson Maia	8	1	7+1	1
12	DF	(Indonesia) IDN	Rifad Marasabessy	8	0	6+2	0
19	DF	(Indonesia) IDN	Achmad Maulana	3	0	3	0
23	DF	(Indonesia) IDN	Anwar Rifai	13	0	4+9	0
26	DF	(Brazil) BRA	Luiz Gustavo	17	0	17	0
66	DF	(Indonesia) IDN	Hansamu Yama	14	2	14	2
72	DF	(Indonesia) IDN	Bayu Setiawan	14	0	11+3	0
87	DF	(Indonesia) IDN	Johan Alfarizi	28	0	23+5	0
96	DF	(Indonesia) IDN	Iksan Lestaluhu	15	2	10+5	2
Midfielders
6	MF	(Colombia) COL	Julián Guevara	21	0	17+4	0
8	MF	(Indonesia) IDN	Arkhan Fikri	27	2	24+3	2
10	MF	(Brazil) BRA	Valdeci	26	5	14+12	5
13	MF	(Indonesia) IDN	Samuel Balinsa	19	0	1+18	0
14	MF	(Indonesia) IDN	Jayus Hariono	21	0	4+17	0
22	MF	(Indonesia) IDN	Aswin	0	0	0	0
25	MF	(Brazil) BRA	Matheus Blade	30	1	29+1	1
28	MF	(Brazil) BRA	Betinho	26	0	25+1	0
32	MF	(Brazil) BRA	Pablo Oliveira	3	0	2+1	0
77	MF	(Brazil) BRA	Gustavo França	17	3	14+3	3
Forwards
7	FW	(Brazil) BRA	Gabriel Silva	17	5	16+1	5
9	FW	(Brazil) BRA	Joel Vinícius	15	8	15	8
11	FW	(Indonesia) IDN	Salim Tuharea	16	0	8+8	0
15	FW	(Indonesia) IDN	Fikri Arjidan	2	0	0+2	0
16	FW	(Indonesia) IDN	Agusti Ardiansyah	0	0	0	0
17	FW	(Indonesia) IDN	Dwiki Mardiyanto	8	0	0+8	0
20	FW	(Indonesia) IDN	Razzaa Fachrezi	3	0	0+3	0
27	FW	(Indonesia) IDN	Dedik Setiawan	11	0	4+7	0
41	FW	(Indonesia) IDN	Dendi Santoso	13	0	1+12	0
70	FW	(Indonesia) IDN	Dimas Aryaguna	0	0	0	0
94	FW	(Brazil) BRA	Dalberto	28	19	26+2	19
Players transferred or loaned out during the season the club
2	DF	(Indonesia) IDN	Achmad Figo	0	0	0	0
3	DF	(Indonesia) IDN	Bayu Aji	0	0	0	0
4	DF	(Brazil) BRA	Odivan Koerich	8	0	5+3	0
5	DF	(Brazil) BRA	Yann Motta	5	0	5	0
7	FW	(Indonesia) IDN	Hamzah Titofani	0	0	0	0
9	FW	(Brazil) BRA	Paulinho Moccelin	12	0	11+1	0
18	DF	(Indonesia) IDN	Brandon Scheunemann	0	0	0	0
21	FW	(Argentina) ARG	Ian Puleio	15	2	9+6	2
24	FW	(Indonesia) IDN	Muhammad Rafli	5	0	0+5	0
29	DF	(Indonesia) IDN	Alfiansyah	0	0	0	0
67	MF	(Indonesia) IDN	Sulthon Fajar	0	0	0	0

=== Top scorers ===
The list is sorted by shirt number when total goals are equal.

Rnk	Pos	No.	Player	Super League	Total
1	FW	94	(Brazil) Dalberto	19	19
2	FW	9	(Brazil) Joel Vinícius	8	8
3	FW	7	(Brazil) Gabriel Silva	6	6
4	MF	10	(Brazil) Valdeci	5	5
5	MF	77	(Brazil) Gustavo França	4	4
6	MF	8	(Indonesia) Arkhan Fikri	2	2
6	DF	66	(Indonesia) Hansamu Yama	2	2
6	DF	96	(Indonesia) Iksan Lestaluhu	2	2
6	FW	21	(Argentina) Ian Puleio	2	2
10	DF	5	(Brazil) Walisson Maia	1	1
10	MF	25	(Brazil) Matheus Blade	1	1
Own goals				3	3
Total				53	53
