= 2024–25 Arema F.C. season =

Arema F.C.
2024–25 season
- CEO: Iwan Budianto
- Head coach: Joel Cornelli (until 19 December 2024); Kuncoro (caretaker, from 19 December 2024 to 4 January 2025); Zé Gomes (from 4 January 2025)
- Stadium: Gelora Supriyadi Stadium (until 13 March 2025); Kapten I Wayan Dipta Stadium (until 28 April 2025); Kanjuruhan Stadium
- Liga 1: 10th
- Top goalscorer: Dalberto (15)
- Highest home attendance: 2,850 (vs. Persik, 11 May 2025)
- Lowest home attendance: 121 (vs. Bali United, 3 February 2025) (excluding matches played behind closed doors)
- Average home league attendance: 238
Away colours

The 2024–25 Arema F.C. season is Arema's 35th competitive season. The club will compete in Liga 1. Arema Football Club a professional football club based in Malang, East Java, Indonesia.

== Squad information ==
=== First team squad ===
Note: Flags indicate national team as defined under FIFA eligibility rules; some limited exceptions apply. Players may hold more than one non-FIFA nationality.

No.	Pos.	Nation	Player
3	DF	IDN	Bayu Aji
4	DF	IDN	Syaeful Anwar
5	DF	BRA	Thales Lira
6	MF	COL	Julián Guevara
7	FW	IDN	Hamzah Titofani
8	MF	IDN	Arkhan Fikri
11	FW	AUS	Charles Lokolingoy
12	DF	IDN	Rifad Marasabessy
13	MF	IDN	Samuel Balinsa
16	MF	IDN	Daffa Fahish
17	MF	IDN	Aswin
18	DF	IDN	Brandon Scheunemann
19	DF	IDN	Achmad Maulana
21	FW	IDN	Flabio Soares

No.	Pos.	Nation	Player
22	GK	IDN	Dicki Agung
23	DF	IDN	Anwar Rifai
24	FW	IDN	Muhammad Rafli
27	FW	IDN	Dedik Setiawan
30	FW	IDN	Salim Tuharea
31	GK	BRA	Lucas Frigeri
32	MF	BRA	Pablo Oliveira
41	FW	IDN	Dendi Santoso (vice-captain)
67	MF	IDN	Sulthon Fajar
72	DF	IDN	Bayu Setiawan
87	DF	IDN	Johan Alfarizi (captain)
94	FW	BRA	Dalberto
95	GK	IDN	Andrian Casvari
96	DF	IDN	Iksan Lestaluhu

== Transfers ==
=== In ===
No.	Pos	Player	Transferred From	Fee	Date	Source
16	MF	(Indonesia) Daffa Fahish	(Indonesia) Persikalis	Free	25 June 2024	
23	DF	(Indonesia) Anwar Rifai	(Indonesia) Madura United	Free	25 June 2024	
30	FW	(Indonesia) Salim Tuharea	(Indonesia) Madura United	Free	25 June 2024	
72	DF	(Indonesia) Bayu Setiawan	(Indonesia) PSS	Free	25 June 2024	
95	GK	(Indonesia) Andrian Casvari	(Indonesia) Madura United	Free	25 June 2024	
96	DF	(Indonesia) Iksan Lestaluhu	(Indonesia) Madura United	Free	25 June 2024	
5	DF	(Brazil) Thales Lira	(Indonesia) PSS	Free	1 July 2024	
10	MF	(Brazil) Wiliam Marcílio	(Malta) Naxxar Lions	Free	1 July 2024	
20	DF	(South Korea) Choi Bo-kyung	Free agent	Free	1 July 2024	
67	MF	(Indonesia) Sulthon Fajar	(Indonesia) Persis	Free	3 July 2024	
31	GK	(Brazil) Lucas Frigeri	(Indonesia) Madura United	Free	6 July 2024	
94	FW	(Brazil) Dalberto	(Indonesia) Madura United	Free	17 July 2024	
32	MF	(Brazil) Pablo Oliveira	(Brazil) Sampaio Corrêa	Free	13 August 2024	
17	MF	(Indonesia) Aswin	(Indonesia) PON Sulbar	Free	10 January 2025	
18	DF	(Indonesia) Brandon Scheunemann	(Indonesia) PSIS	Free	14 January 2025	

=== Out ===
No.	Pos	Player	Transferred To	Fee	Date	Source
23	GK	(Indonesia) Teguh Amiruddin	(Indonesia) Semen Padang	Free	15 June 2024	
—	MF	(Indonesia) Evan Dimas	(Indonesia) Persik	Free	18 June 2024	
5	DF	(Indonesia) Bagas Adi	(Indonesia) Bali United	Free	19 June 2024	
7	MF	(Argentina) Ariel Lucero	(Argentina) Olimpo	Free	1 July 2024	
18	GK	(Philippines) Julian Schwarzer	(Wales) Newtown	Free	30 June 2024	
32	MF	(Brazil) Charles Almeida	(Argentina) Olimpo	Free	30 June 2024	
86	FW	(Indonesia) Greg Nwokolo	-	Retired	30 June 2024	
—	GK	(Indonesia) Adixi Lenzivio	(Indonesia) Persipu	Free	30 June 2024	
—	DF	(Indonesia) Rizky Dwi Febrianto	(Indonesia) Persis	Free	30 June 2024	
—	DF	(Indonesia) Asyraq Gufron	(Indonesia) PSIM	Free	30 June 2024	
—	MF	(Indonesia) Ahmad Bustomi	-	Retired	30 June 2024	
—	MF	(Indonesia) Iman Budi Hernandi	(Indonesia) RANS Nusantara	Free	30 June 2024	
—	FW	(Brazil) Gustavo	(Indonesia) Persija	Free	30 June 2024	
—	MF	(Indonesia) Rendra Teddy	(Indonesia) PSIM	Free	3 July 2024	
—	DF	(Indonesia) Hamdi Sula	(Indonesia) Persekat	Free	28 July 2024	
—	FW	(Indonesia) Samsudin	(Indonesia) Persikota	Free	4 August 2024	
—	FW	(Indonesia) Gufroni Al Maruf	(Indonesia) PSKC	Free	6 August 2024	
—	DF	(Indonesia) Ikhfanul Alam	(Indonesia) Persiku	Free	12 August 2024	
10	MF	(Brazil) Wiliam Marcílio	(Indonesia) Persib	Free	1 May 2025	
20	DF	(South Korea) Choi Bo-kyung	(South Korea) Chungnam Asan	Free	1 May 2025	

=== Loan Out ===
No.	Pos	Player	Loaned To	Start	End	Source
26	DF	(Indonesia) Achmad Figo	(Indonesia) PSS	31 July 2024	30 June 2025	
—	MF	(Indonesia) Kevin Armedyah	(Indonesia) Persekat	31 July 2024	1 December 2024	
—	MF	(Indonesia) Kevin Armedyah	(Indonesia) Sumut United	1 December 2024	30 June 2025	
14	MF	(Indonesia) Jayus Hariono	(Indonesia) PSS	12 January 2025	30 June 2025	

== Pre-seasons and friendlies ==
=== Piala Presiden ===
==== Group stage ====
Date	Opponents	H / A	Result F–A	Scorers	Attendance	Group position
21 July 2024	Bali United	N	1–0	Tuharea 11'	3,942	2nd
24 July 2024	Persija	N	2–2	Tuharea 54', Lokolingoy 67'	993	2nd
26 July 2024	Madura United	N	5–0	Dalberto (2) 23', 45+3', Wiliam 73', Dedik 90', Flabio 90+3'	471	1st

Pos	Team	Pld	W	D	L	GF	GA	GD	Pts	Qualification
1	Arema	3	2	1	0	8	2	+6	7	Advance to knockout stage
2	Persija	3	1	1	1	4	6	−2	4	Advance to knockout stage
3	Madura United	3	1	0	2	4	9	−5	3 (Note: Head-to-head result: Bali United 2–3 Madura United.)	
4	Bali United (H)	3	1	0	2	5	4	+1	3	

Source: Piala Presiden 2024
Rules for classification: 1) Points; 2) Head-to-head points; 3) Head-to-head goal difference; 4) Head-to-head goals scored; 5) Goal difference; 6) Goals scored; 7) Fair-play points; 8) Draw.
(H) Hosts

==== Knockout phase ====
Date	Round	Opponents	H / A	Result F–A	Scorers	Attendance
31 July 2024	Semi-finals	Persis	N	2–0	Lokolingoy (2) 59', 82'	11,227
4 August 2024	Final	Borneo Samarinda	N	1–1 (5–4p)	Wiliam 49'	8,933

== Match results ==
=== Liga 1 ===
==== Matches ====
Date	Opponents	H / A	Result F–A	Scorers	Attendance	League position
12 August 2024	Dewa United	H	0–0		831	10th
17 August 2024	Borneo Samarinda	H	0–2		839	14th
25 August 2024	Persib	A	1–1	Dalberto 39'	17,337	14th
11 September 2024	Bali United	A	0–0		4,059	14th
15 September 2024	PSM	A	1–0	Dalberto 53'	1,915	13th
20 September 2024	PSS	A	1–3	Lokolingoy 53' (pen.)	6,686	14th
26 September 2024	PSIS	A	2–1	Dalberto (2) 90', 90+5'	1,116	10th
19 October 2024	Malut United	H	3–1	Wiliam (2) 51', 90+1', Dalberto 80'	269	8th
26 October 2024	Persija	H	1–2	Dalberto 42'	2,402	9th
1 November 2024	Barito Putera	A	3–1	Wiliam 34' (pen.), Tuharea 66', Tito 90+8'	0	7th
21 November 2024	Madura United	A	4–2	Dalberto 8', Achmad 32', Thales 45+1', Lokolingoy 85'	489	7th
3 December 2024	Persita	H	3–0	Dedik 45+4', Dalberto 51', Lokolingoy 90+6'	225	6th
7 December 2024	Persebaya	A	2–3	Damjanović 45' (o.g.), Wiliam 83' (pen.)	25,000	7th
12 December 2024	Persis	H	1–1	Wiliam 8'	352	7th
16 December 2024	Persik	A	0–1		1,521	9th
21 December 2024	PSBS	H	3–2	Tuharea 27', Dalberto 34', Lokolingoy 53' (pen.)	256	7th
27 December 2024	Semen Padang	A	2–1	Lokolingoy 23', Tuharea 33'	4,750	5th
11 January 2025	Dewa United	A	0–2		178	9th
19 January 2025	Borneo Samarinda	A	1–3	Dalberto 49'	1,345	10th
24 January 2025	Persib	H	1–3	Lokolingoy 45+1'	1,164	10th
3 February 2025	Bali United	H	1–0	Tuharea 57'	121	9th
10 February 2025	PSM	H	1–1	Oliveira 66'	201	11th
17 February 2025	PSS	H	6–2	Bayu 2', Dalberto (2) 49' (pen.), 82', Lokolingoy 53', Rafli 90+12', Arkhan 90+17'	0 (Note: Arema held home matches without spectators for efficiency reasons.)	7th
24 February 2025	PSIS	H	2–2	Oliveira 5', Lokolingoy 27'	0	9th
4 March 2025	Malut United	A	1–2	Rafli 90+2'	4,625	9th
9 March 2025	Persija	A	3–1	Oliveira 65', Dalberto 67', Ferarri 73' (o.g.)	0	7th
13 March 2025	Barito Putera	H	4–2	Dalberto 23', Dedik 28', Lokolingoy 40', Tuharea 74'	0	6th
20 April 2025	Persita	A	2–3	Dedik 26', Dalberto 32'	3,313	8th
24 April 2025 (Note: The Liga 1 match home to Madura United, originally scheduled for 13 April 2025, was postponed due to Madura United's schedule is close to the AFC Challenge League match against Preah Khan Reach Svay Rieng on 10 and 17 April 2025.)	Madura United	H	0–1		0 (Note: Arema held home matches without spectators as for security reasons.)	8th
28 April 2025	Persebaya	H	1–1	Thales 70'	0	10th
5 May 2025	Persis	A	1–0	Arkhan 79'	11,521	9th
11 May 2025	Persik	H	0–3		2,850	10th
18 May 2025	PSBS	A	2–2	Lokolingoy 26', Tuharea 83'	2,268	9th
24 May 2025	Semen Padang	H	0–2		0 (Note: Arema were sanctioned with one home matches to be played without spectators following a decision by the PSSI Disciplinary Committee.)	10th

==== League table ====
Pos	Team	Pld	W	D	L	GF	GA	GD	Pts
8	Bali United	34	14	8	12	50	41	+9	50
9	PSBS	34	13	9	12	44	47	−3	48
10	Arema	34	13	8	13	53	51	+2	47
11	Persita	34	12	7	15	32	43	−11	43
12	Persik	34	10	11	13	40	42	−2	41

Source: Liga 1 2024–25
Rules for classification: 1) Points; 2) Head-to-head points; 3) Head-to-head goal difference; 4) Head-to-head goals scored; 5) Goal difference; 6) Goals scored; 7) Fair-play points; 8) Drawing of lots.

== Statistics ==
=== Squad appearances and goals ===
No.	Pos	Nat	Player	Total		Liga 1	
No.	Pos	Nat	Player	Apps	Goals	Apps	Goals
Goalkeepers
23	GK	(Indonesia) IDN	Dicki Agung	2	0	1+1	0
31	GK	(Brazil) BRA	Lucas Frigeri	33	0	33	0
95	GK	(Indonesia) IDN	Andrian Casvari	0	0	0	0
Defenders
3	DF	(Indonesia) IDN	Bayu Aji	4	0	2+2	0
4	DF	(Indonesia) IDN	Syaeful Anwar	5	0	3+2	0
5	DF	(Brazil) BRA	Thales Lira	29	2	29	2
12	DF	(Indonesia) IDN	Rifad Marasabessy	12	0	4+8	0
18	DF	(Indonesia) IDN	Brandon Scheunemann	1	0	0+1	0
19	DF	(Indonesia) IDN	Achmad Maulana	26	1	26	1
23	DF	(Indonesia) IDN	Anwar Rifai	12	0	6+6	0
72	DF	(Indonesia) IDN	Bayu Setiawan	25	1	16+9	1
87	DF	(Indonesia) IDN	Johan Alfarizi	28	0	28	0
96	DF	(Indonesia) IDN	Iksan Lestaluhu	15	0	3+12	0
Midfielders
6	MF	(Colombia) COL	Julián Guevara	31	0	23+8	0
8	MF	(Indonesia) IDN	Arkhan Fikri	29	2	28+1	2
13	MF	(Indonesia) IDN	Samuel Balinsa	24	0	4+20	0
16	MF	(Indonesia) IDN	Daffa Fahish	0	0	0	0
17	MF	(Indonesia) IDN	Aswin	0	0	0	0
32	MF	(Brazil) BRA	Pablo Oliveira	27	3	27	3
67	MF	(Indonesia) IDN	Sulthon Fajar	7	0	6+1	0
Forwards
7	FW	(Indonesia) IDN	Hamzah Titofani	17	1	1+16	1
11	FW	(Australia) AUS	Charles Lokolingoy	34	10	24+10	10
21	FW	(Indonesia) IDN	Flabio Soares	1	0	0+1	0
24	FW	(Indonesia) IDN	Muhammad Rafli	19	2	4+15	2
27	FW	(Indonesia) IDN	Dedik Setiawan	28	3	15+13	3
30	FW	(Indonesia) IDN	Salim Tuharea	26	6	19+7	6
41	FW	(Indonesia) IDN	Dendi Santoso	15	0	10+5	0
94	FW	(Brazil) BRA	Dalberto	33	15	30+3	15
Players transferred or loaned out during the season the club
10	MF	(Brazil) BRA	Wiliam Marcílio	19	5	14+5	5
14	MF	(Indonesia) IDN	Jayus Hariono	4	0	3+1	0
20	DF	(South Korea) KOR	Choi Bo-kyung	17	0	15+2	0

=== Top scorers ===
The list is sorted by shirt number when total goals are equal.

Rnk	Pos	No.	Player	Liga 1	Total
1	FW	94	(Brazil) Dalberto	15	15
2	FW	11	(Australia) Charles Lokolingoy	10	10
3	FW	30	(Indonesia) Salim Tuharea	6	6
4	MF	10	(Brazil) Wiliam Marcílio	5	5
5	FW	27	(Indonesia) Dedik Setiawan	3	3
5	MF	32	(Brazil) Pablo Oliveira	3	3
7	DF	5	(Brazil) Thales Lira	2	2
7	MF	8	(Indonesia) Arkhan Fikri	2	2
7	FW	24	(Indonesia) Muhammad Rafli	2	2
10	FW	7	(Indonesia) Hamzah Titofani	1	1
10	DF	19	(Indonesia) Achmad Maulana	1	1
10	DF	72	(Indonesia) Bayu Setiawan	1	1
Own goals				2	2
Total				53	53
