= 2024 Piala Presiden final =

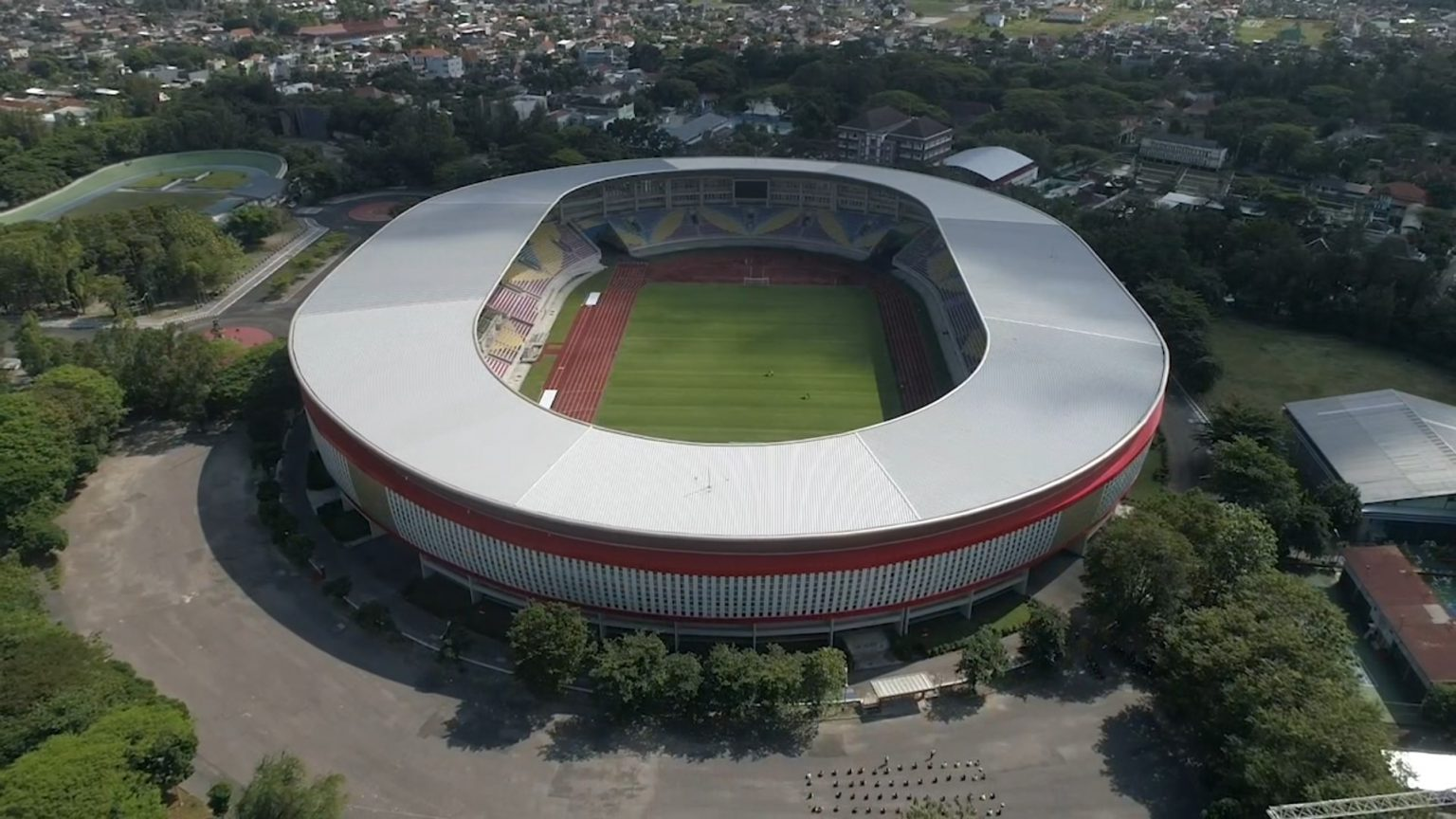
- The final match was held at Manahan Stadium
- Event: 2024 Piala Presiden
Borneo Samarinda	Arema
1	1
- Arema won 5–4 on penalties
- Date: 4 August 2024
- Venue: Manahan Stadium, Surakarta
- Referee: Sance Lawita (Manado)
- Attendance: 8,933

The 2024 Piala Presiden final was the final match of the 2024 Piala Presiden, the 6th season of Indonesia's pre-season premier club football tournament organised by PSSI. It was played at the Manahan Stadium, in Surakarta, Indonesia on 4 August 2024.

The final was played by Borneo Samarinda against the defending champions Arema. This match was a repeat of the previous final, which was won by Arema with an aggregate score of 1–0. This was the third time the two teams met in the final.

== Background ==
=== Borneo Samarinda ===
Borneo Samarinda has reached the final twice before, in the 2017 and 2022 editions respectively, both of which were against Arema and ended in defeat. In the 2017 final Borneo Samarinda lost 1–5 single match, while in 2022 they lost 0–1 on aggregate.

=== Arema ===
Arema have reached the final three times before, in the 2017, 2019 and 2022 editions respectively, all of which ended in victory. In the 2017 final Arema won 5–1 over Borneo Samarinda in a single match, while in the 2019 finals Arema defeated Persebaya 4–2 on aggregate. Then in the 2022 finals Arema again defeated Borneo Samarinda 1–0 on aggregate.

=== Previous finals ===
Team	Previous final appearances (bold indicates winners)
Borneo Samrinda	2 (2017, 2022)
Arema	3 (**2017**, **2019**, **2022**)

== Route to the final ==
Borneo Samarinda
Round
Arema
Opponent
Result
Group stage
Opponent
Result
Persis
2–0
Matchday 1
Bali United
1–0
Persib
1–0
Matchday 2
Persija
2–2
PSM
1–1
Matchday 3
Madura United
5–0
**Group A** **winner**

Pos	Team	Pld	Pts
**1**	Borneo Samarinda	**3**	**7**
2	Persis	3	**4**
3	Persib (H)	3	**3**
4	PSM	3	**2**

Source: Piala Presiden 2024
(H) Hosts
Final standings
**Group B** **winner**

Pos	Team	Pld	Pts
**1**	Arema	**3**	**7**
2	Persija	3	**4**
3	Madura United	3	**3**
4	Bali United (H)	3	**3**

Source: Piala Presiden 2024
(H) Hosts
Opponent
Result
Knockout stage
Opponent
Result
Persija
2–1
Semi-finals
Persis
2–0

== Format ==
The final was played as a single match. If tied after regulation time, extra time would not be played, and a match would go straight to a penalty shoot-out to determine the winner.

== Match ==
4 August 2024
19:30 WIB (UTC+7)

Borneo Samarinda	1–1	Arema
L. Gaúcho 62'	Report	Wiliam 49'
Penalties
Berguinho (penalty scored); Nduwarugira (penalty scored); Ronaldo (penalty missed); Jusuf (penalty scored); L. Gaúcho (penalty scored)	4–5	(penalty scored) Lokolingoy; (penalty scored) Wiliam; (penalty scored) Julian G.; (penalty scored) Dalberto; (penalty scored) Frigeri

Manahan Stadium, Surakarta
Attendance: 8,933
Referee: Sance Lawita (Manado)

**Borneo Samarinda**	**Arema**

GK	25	(Indonesia) Nadeo Argawinata
RB	56	(Indonesia) Fajar Fathur Rahman
CB	22	(Burundi) Christophe Nduwarugira
CB	2	(Brazil) Ronaldo Rodrigues
LB	15	(Indonesia) Leo Guntara	(yellow card) 28'	(substituted off) 79'
DM	12	(Indonesia) Hendro Siswanto		(substituted off) 90+11'
CM	8	(Japan) Kei Hirose
AM	97	(Brazil) Berguinho
RW	28	(Indonesia) Terens Puhiri		(substituted off) 79'
LW	14	(Indonesia) Stefano Lilipaly (c)	(red card) 85'
CF	9	(Brazil) Léo Gaúcho	(yellow card) 68'
Substitutions:
GK	1	(Indonesia) Angga Saputro
CB	5	(Brazil) Gabriel Furtado		(substituted on) 79'
AM	6	(Indonesia) Ikhsan Zikrak
LW	7	(Indonesia) Ari Maring
CB	16	(Indonesia) Komang Teguh
CB	24	(Indonesia) Diego Michiels
DM	50	(Indonesia) Rivaldo Pakpahan
LB	55	(Indonesia) Dandi Sonriza		(substituted on) 79'
DM	66	(Indonesia) Dwiky Hardiansyah
CF	68	(Indonesia) Habibi Jusuf		(substituted on) 90+11'
RB	88	(Indonesia) Dika Kuswardani
RW	99	(Indonesia) Muhammad Sihran
Manager:
(Netherlands) Pieter Huistra

GK	31	(Brazil) Lucas Frigeri
RB	19	(Indonesia) Achmad Maulana
CB	5	(Brazil) Thales Lira
CB	20	(South Korea) Choi Bo-kyung
LB	87	(Indonesia) Johan Alfarizi (c)
DM	8	(Indonesia) Arkhan Fikri
CM	6	(Colombia) Julián Guevara
AM	10	(Brazil) Wiliam Marcílio
RW	30	(Indonesia) Salim Tuharea		(substituted off) 72'
LW	94	(Brazil) Dalberto	(yellow card) 82'
CF	11	(Australia) Charles Lokolingoy
Substitutions:
CB	3	(Indonesia) Bayu Aji
CB	4	(Indonesia) Syaeful Anwar
LM	7	(Indonesia) Hamzah Titofani
DM	13	(Indonesia) Samuel Balinsa
DM	14	(Indonesia) Jayus Hariono
CM	21	(Indonesia) Flabio Soares
GK	22	(Indonesia) Dicki Agung
CB	23	(Indonesia) Anwar Rifai
AM	24	(Indonesia) Muhammad Rafli
CF	27	(Indonesia) Dedik Setiawan		(substituted on) 72'
AM	67	(Indonesia) Sulthon Fajar
RB	72	(Indonesia) Bayu Setiawan
Manager:
(Brazil) Joel Cornelli

Man of the Match:

Assistant referees:
Karnedi (Pekanbaru)
Mochamad Fatlan (East Jakarta)
Fourth official:
Gedion Dapaherang (East Jakarta)
Video assistant referee:
Armyn Dwi Suryathin (Lubuklinggau)
Assistant video assistant referee:
Mohammad Ansori (West Jakarta)

**Match rules**

- 90 minutes
- Penalty shoot-out if tied after regulation time
- Ten named substitutes

== See also ==
- 2024 Piala Presiden
- 2024–25 Liga 1
