= 2024 Liga 1 (Indonesia) finals =

- Event: 2023–24 Liga 1 (Indonesia)
Persib Bandung	Madura United
6	1

First leg
Persib Bandung	Madura United
3	0
- Date: 26 May 2024
- Venue: Si Jalak Harupat Stadium, Bandung
- Man of the Match: David da Silva (Persib)
- Referee: Tommi Manggopa (Bolaang Mongondow)
- Attendance: 20,655
- Weather: Cloudy; 32 °C (90 °F)

Second leg
Madura United	Persib Bandung
1	3
- Date: 31 May 2024
- Venue: Gelora Bangkalan Stadium, Bangkalan
- Man of the Match: Ciro Alves (Persib)
- Referee: Aidil Azmi (Banda Aceh)
- Attendance: 6,449
- Weather: Cloudy; 29 °C (84 °F)

The 2024 Liga 1 finals was the finals of the 2023–24 Liga 1, the 27th season of the Indonesian top flight league since the merger of Perserikatan and Galatama in 1994, and the seventh season under the name of Liga 1. It was the first season since the 2014 Indonesia Super League to hold a final match following the usage of a championship series format.

Persib Bandung won the finals against Madura United by 6–1 on aggregate after a two-legged home-and-away matches.

The first leg of the finals took place in Persib's homebase, Si Jalak Harupat Stadium on 26 May 2024, ending with Persib's victory of 3–0. Meanwhile, the second leg was held on 31 May 2024 in Gelora Bangkalan Stadium, the homebase of Madura United, in which Madura suffered a 1–3 loss.

As the winners, Persib Bandung will earn the right to enter the 2024–25 AFC Champions League 2 from the group stage, while the runner-up, Madura United, will enter the group stage of the 2024–25 AFC Challenge League.

== Background ==
=== Persib Bandung ===
Since the Perserikatan and Galatama unified top flight league era, Persib Bandung had reached the final twice before, each in the inaugural 1994–95 season and the 2014 season, which was both won. In the 1995 final, Persib won 1–0 over Petrokimia Putra, while in 2014, Persib defeated Persipura Jayapura 5–3 in penalties after a 2–2 draw in 120 minutes.

=== Madura United ===
Madura United had not reached a unified top flight league final before. Their last national final was the 1993–94 Galatama, back when the club was still named Pelita Jaya. In the match, they clinched a 1–0 victory over Gelora Dewata to secure the last Galatama championship title.

Their best performance in the current league era was in 2014 as Pelita Bandung Raya, where they ultimately lost 0–2 in the semi-final against Persipura Jayapura.

=== Previous finals ===
Team	Previous final appearances (bold indicates winners)
Persib	2 (**1995**, **2014**)
Madura United	None

== Road to the finals ==
Persib
Round
Madura United
Regular Series runner-up

Pos	Team	Pld	Pts
1	Borneo Samarinda	34	70
2	Persib (C)	34	62
3	Bali United	34	58
4	Madura United	34	55
5	Dewa United	34	54

Source: BRI Liga 1 2023–24
(C) Champions
Regular series
Regular Series fourth place

Pos	Team	Pld	Pts
2	Persib (C)	34	62
3	Bali United	34	58
4	Madura United	34	55
5	Dewa United	34	54
6	PSIS	34	53

Source: BRI Liga 1 2023–24
(C) Champions
Opponent
Agg.
1st leg
2nd leg
Championship series
Opponent
Agg.
1st leg
2nd leg
Bali United
4–1
1–1 (A)
3–0 (H)
Semi-finals
Borneo Samarinda
4–2
1–0 (H)
3–2 (A)

== Format ==
The finals were played over two-legged home-and-away matches, the first usage of this system in an Indonesian top flight division final, as previous finals were always contested as a single-match tie.

If the aggregate score was tied after two legs, extra time and, if necessary, a penalty shoot-out would be used to decide the winning team.

== Matches ==
=== First leg ===
==== Details ====
26 May 2024
19:00 WIB (UTC+7)

Persib	3–0	Madura United
Ciro Alves 70'; David da Silva 90+4', 90+12'	Report

Jalak Harupat Stadium, Bandung
Attendance: 20,655
Referee: Tommi Manggopa (Bolaang Mongondow)

Persib	Madura United

GK	29	(Philippines) Kevin Ray Mendoza
RB	12	(Indonesia) Henhen Herdiana
CB	22	(Spain) Alberto Rodríguez
CB	2	(Netherlands) Nick Kuipers
LB	56	(Indonesia) Rezaldi Hehanussa	(yellow card) 90+9'
DM	11	(Indonesia) Dedi Kusnandar (c)	(yellow card) 43'	(substituted off) 76'
CM	53	(Indonesia) Rachmat Irianto		(substituted off) 90+7'
AM	93	(Italy) Stefano Beltrame	(yellow card) 90+8'
RW	13	(Indonesia) Febri Hariyadi		(substituted off) 76'
LW	77	(Brazil) Ciro Alves		(substituted off) 90+7'
CF	19	(Brazil) David da Silva
Substitutions:
GK	14	(Indonesia) Teja Paku Alam
CB	5	(Indonesia) Kakang Rudianto
RW	7	(Indonesia) Beckham Putra		(substituted in) 84'
CF	9	(Indonesia) Ezra Walian		(substituted in) 76'
LW	18	(Indonesia) Ferdiansyah
LB	27	(Indonesia) Zalnando
CB	32	(Indonesia) Victor Igbonefo
CM	71	(Indonesia) Adzikry Fadlillah		(substituted in) 90+7'
RW	96	(Indonesia) Ryan Kurnia		(substituted in) 90+7'
LB	97	(Indonesia) Edo Febriansah		(substituted in) 76'	(substituted off) 84'
Manager:
(Croatia) Bojan Hodak

GK	1	(Brazil) Lucas Frigeri
RB	33	(Indonesia) Koko Ari
CB	4	(Brazil) Cleberson
CB	19	(Indonesia) Fachruddin Aryanto (c)
LB	76	(Indonesia) Dodi Alekvan Djin		(substituted off) 67'
DM	7	(Mexico) Francisco Rivera	(yellow card) 55'
CM	8	(Brazil) Hugo Gomes		(substituted off) 67'
AM	5	(Singapore) Jacob Mahler	(yellow card) 39'
RW	21	(Indonesia) Riyatno Abiyoso		(substituted off) 67'
LW	77	(Indonesia) Malik Risaldi	(yellow card) 45+2'
CF	94	(Brazil) Dalberto		(substituted off) 83'
Substitutions:
GK	88	(Indonesia) Satria Tama
CB	2	(Indonesia) Guntur Ariyadi
DM	10	(Indonesia) Slamet Nurcahyono
CM	15	(Indonesia) Ricki Ariansyah		(substituted in) 67'
RW	23	(Indonesia) Bayu Gatra		(substituted in) 67'
RB	26	(Indonesia) Novan Sasongko		(substituted in) 67'
LW	27	(Indonesia) Make Aldo
LB	28	(Indonesia) Kartika Vedhayanto
CF	31	(Indonesia) Yuda Editya		(substituted in) 83'
DM	42	(Indonesia) Feby Ramzy
Manager:
(Indonesia) Rakhmad Basuki (caretaker)

Man of the Match:
David da Silva (Persib)

Assistant referees:
Mochamad Fatlan (East Jakarta)
Arsyad Najamuddin (Balikpapan)
Fourth official:
Candra (Padang)
Video assistant referee:
Heru Cahyono (South Jakarta)
Assistant video assistant referee:
Azizul Alimmudin Hanafiah (Yogyakarta)

Match rules

- 90 minutes
- Ten named substitutes, of which up to five may be used

==== Statistics ====
Overall
Statistic	Persib	Madura United
Goals scored	3	0
Total shots	15	11
Shots on target	7	2
Ball possession	39%	61%
Passes	335	464
Corner kicks	2	2
Offsides	0	0
Fouls conceded	5	17
Yellow cards	3	3
Red cards	0	0

=== Second leg ===
==== Details ====
31 May 2024
19:00 WIB (UTC+7)

Madura United	1–3	Persib
Slamet Nurcahyono 90+7' (pen.)	Report	David da Silva 60'; Marc Klok 86'; Beckham Putra 90+2'

Gelora Bangkalan Stadium, Bangkalan
Attendance: 6,449
Referee: Aidil Azmi (Banda Aceh)

Madura United	Persib

GK	1	(Brazil) Lucas Frigeri
RB	26	(Indonesia) Novan Sasongko	(substituted off) 82'
CB	19	(Indonesia) Fachruddin Aryanto (c)
CB	4	(Brazil) Cleberson
LB	33	(Indonesia) Koko Ari
DM	7	(Mexico) Francisco Rivera
CM	8	(Brazil) Hugo Gomes	(substituted off) 65'
CM	5	(Singapore) Jacob Mahler	(substituted off) 90'
RW	76	(Indonesia) Dodi Alekvan Djin	(substituted off) 65'
LW	77	(Indonesia) Malik Risaldi
CF	94	(Brazil) Dalberto	(substituted off) 90'
Substitutions:
GK	88	(Indonesia) Satria Tama
CB	2	(Indonesia) Guntur Ariyadi	(substituted in) 82'
DM	10	(Indonesia) Slamet Nurcahyono	(substituted in) 65'
CM	15	(Indonesia) Ricki Ariansyah
RW	21	(Indonesia) Riyatno Abiyoso	(substituted in) 65'
RW	23	(Indonesia) Bayu Gatra
LW	27	(Indonesia) Make Aldo
LB	28	(Indonesia) Kartika Vedhayanto
CF	31	(Indonesia) Yuda Editya	(substituted in) 90'
DM	42	(Indonesia) Feby Ramzy	(substituted in) 90'
Manager:
(Indonesia) Rakhmad Basuki (caretaker)

GK	29	(Philippines) Kevin Ray Mendoza		(substituted off) 90'
RB	12	(Indonesia) Henhen Herdiana	(yellow card) 58'	(substituted off) 72'
CB	22	(Spain) Alberto Rodríguez
CB	2	(Netherlands) Nick Kuipers
LB	56	(Indonesia) Rezaldi Hehanussa
DM	11	(Indonesia) Dedi Kusnandar (c)		(substituted off) 40'
CM	53	(Indonesia) Rachmat Irianto
AM	93	(Italy) Stefano Beltrame
RW	13	(Indonesia) Febri Hariyadi		(substituted off) 72'
LW	77	(Brazil) Ciro Alves
CF	19	(Brazil) David da Silva
Substitutions:
GK	14	(Indonesia) Teja Paku Alam		(substituted in) 90'
CB	5	(Indonesia) Kakang Rudianto
RW	7	(Indonesia) Beckham Putra	(yellow card) 90+3'	(substituted in) 72'
CF	9	(Indonesia) Ezra Walian		(substituted in) 72'
CF	16	(Indonesia) Achmad Jufriyanto
CM	23	(Indonesia) Marc Klok		(substituted in) 40'
LB	27	(Indonesia) Zalnando
CB	32	(Indonesia) Victor Igbonefo
RW	96	(Indonesia) Ryan Kurnia
LB	97	(Indonesia) Edo Febriansah
Manager:
(Croatia) Bojan Hodak

Man of the Match:
Ciro Alves (Persib)

Assistant referees:
Sulaiman Simatupang (Padang Lawas)
Sriyanto (East Jakarta)
Fourth official:
Gedion Dapaherang (East Jakarta)
Video assistant referee:
Aprisman Aranda (Padangpanjang)
Assistant video assistant referee:
Adi Nanda (North Jakarta)

Match rules

- 90 minutes
- 30 minutes of extra time if tied on aggregate and away goals
- Penalty shoot-out if still tied after extra time (no away goals rule applied)
- Ten named substitutes, of which up to five may be used, with a sixth allowed in extra time.

==== Statistics ====
Overall
Statistic	Madura United	Persib
Goals scored	1	3
Total shots	18	18
Shots on target	4	6
Ball possession	73%	27%
Passes	574	232
Corner kicks	10	3
Offsides	0	1
Fouls conceded	14	8
Yellow cards	0	2
Red cards	0	0

== Post-match ==
With this victory, Persib gained their third unified top flight league title, the second best club in terms of the title, only losing to Persipura with four titles. If their five titles in Perserikatan were also considered, they have won a total of eight Indonesian football champions titles. This record was also second best, only beaten by Persija Jakarta which already had a total of eleven titles.

As a Croatian, Bojan Hodak became the first foreign head coach in Persib's history to claim an Indonesian league champions title. Previously in the unified league era, Persib won their titles led by Sundanese locals, Indra Thohir in 1995 and Djadjang Nurdjaman in 2014.

In addition to the title, Persib also received two individual season awards. Bojan Hodak was awarded as the Best Coach, while striker David da Silva became the Top Goalscorer with a total of 30 goals.

For Madura United, this loss was their first in a national league final since the 1987–88 Galatama final, where they lost 1–3 to NIAC Mitra. Nevertheless, this season's result was the best for the team in the unified league era, eclipsing their semi-finalist finish in 2014.

Despite their defeat, Madura United received a consolation with the season's Best Player award given to their midfielder, Francisco Rivera.

== See also ==
- List of Indonesian football champions
