= 2025 Piala Presiden (Indonesia) =

Piala Presiden
2025 Indonesia President's Cup

Tournament details
- Country: Indonesia
- Dates: 6–13 July 2025
- Teams: 6

Final positions
- Champions: (Thailand) Port (1st title)
- Runners-up: (England) Oxford United
- Third place: (Indonesia) Dewa United
- Fourth place: Liga Indonesia All-Stars

Tournament statistics
- Matches played: 8
- Goals scored: 29 (3.63 per match)
- Attendance: 117,704 (14,713 per match)
- Top goal scorer(s): (Wales) Mark Harris (3 goal)

Awards
- Best player: Bordin Phala
- Best young player: Leo Snowden

The 2025 Piala Presiden (English: 2025 Indonesia President's Cup) is the seventh edition of Piala Presiden, held by the PSSI as a pre-season tournament for the 2025–26 Super League.

The tournament is scheduled to take place from 6 July to 12 July 2025. This edition marks the first time foreign clubs have been invited, specifically two teams that include Indonesian players in their squads.

Arema were the defending champions after defeating Borneo Samarinda 5–4 on penalties a 1–1 draw in regular time in the final previous edition.

== Teams ==
The following 6 teams that will participate for the tournament.

Team	App.	Last appearance	Previous best performance	Qualified as
(Indonesia) Persib	7th	2024	Winners (2015)	2024–25 Liga 1 champions
(Indonesia) Arema	7th	2024	Winners (2017, 2019, 2022, 2024)	2024 Piala Presiden title holder
(Indonesia) Dewa United	4th	2022	Group stage (2015, (Note: As Martapura) 2018, 2022)	2024–25 Liga 1 runners-up
Liga Indonesia All-Stars	1st	—	Debutant	Invited
(England) Oxford United (invitee)	1st	—	Debutant	Invited
(Thailand) Port (invitee)	1st	—	Debutant	Invited

== Liga Indonesia All-Stars squad ==
On 19 June 2025, PSSI unveiled an initial shortlist of 55 players, with the final squad of 30 to be selected via a public voting process. The final squad was announced on 26 June 2025.

Head coach: (Indonesia) Rahmad Darmawan

No.	Pos.	Player	Date of birth (age)	Caps	Goals	Club
30	GK	Reza Arya Pratama	18 May 2000 (age 26)	2	0	(Football Association of Indonesia) PSM
96	GK	Kartika Ajie	20 June 1996 (age 30)	1	0	(Football Association of Indonesia) Persita
	GK	Muhammad Riyandi	3 January 2000 (age 26)	0	0	(Football Association of Indonesia) Persis
2	DF	Bagas Kaffa	16 January 2002 (age 24)	3	0	(Football Association of Indonesia) Barito Putera
4	DF	Yusuf Meilana	4 May 1998 (age 28)	3	0	(Football Association of Indonesia) Persik
15	DF	Leo Guntara	17 August 1994 (age 32)	3	0	(Football Association of Indonesia) Borneo Samarinda
16	DF	Rizky Dwi Febrianto	22 February 1997 (age 29)	2	1	(Football Association of Indonesia) Persis
20	DF	Herwin Tri Saputra	10 January 1991 (age 35)	3	0	(Football Association of Indonesia) PSBS
23	DF	Hansamu Yama	16 January 1995 (age 31)	3	0	(Football Association of Indonesia) Persija
26	DF	Komang Tri	24 January 2001 (age 25)	2	0	(Football Association of Indonesia) Bali United
27	DF	Safrudin Tahar	13 December 1993 (age 32)	3	0	(Football Association of Indonesia) Malut United
28	DF	Arif Satria	17 September 1995 (age 31)	2	0	(Football Association of Indonesia) Bhayangkara Presisi
	DF	Ricky Fajrin	6 September 1995 (age 31)	0	0	(Football Association of Indonesia) Bali United
6	MF	Bayu Otto	15 October 1999 (age 27)	2	0	(Football Association of Indonesia) Persik
24	MF	Taufany Muslihuddin	24 March 2002 (age 24)	2	0	(Football Association of Indonesia) Madura United
29	MF	Septian David Maulana	2 September 1996 (age 30)	3	1	(Football Association of Indonesia) PSIS
31	MF	Rosad Setiawan	9 August 1996 (age 30)	3	0	(Football Association of Indonesia) Semen Padang
45	MF	Akbar Tanjung	16 May 1993 (age 33)	3	0	(Football Association of Indonesia) PSM
66	MF	Zahaby Gholy	5 December 2008 (age 17)	3	0	(Football Association of Indonesia) Persija
88	MF	Alwi Slamat	16 December 1998 (age 27)	1	0	(Football Association of Indonesia) Malut United
	MF	Zanadin Fariz	31 May 2004 (age 22)	0	0	(Football Association of Indonesia) Persis
10	FW	Eksel Runtukahu	2 September 1998 (age 28)	3	1	(Football Association of Indonesia) Persija
11	FW	Riski Afrisal	25 April 2006 (age 20)	3	0	(Football Association of Indonesia) Madura United
21	FW	Irkham Mila	2 May 1998 (age 28)	2	0	(Football Association of Indonesia) Semen Padang
25	FW	Riko Simanjuntak	26 January 1992 (age 34)	3	1	(Football Association of Indonesia) Persija
78	FW	Witan Sulaeman	8 October 2001 (age 25)	3	1	(Football Association of Indonesia) Persija
97	FW	Mohammad Khanafi	30 November 1997 (age 28)	3	0	(Football Association of Indonesia) Persik
	FW	Irfan Jaya	1 May 1996 (age 30)	0	0	(Football Association of Indonesia) Bali United
	FW	Dendy Sulistyawan	12 October 1996 (age 30)	0	0	(Football Association of Indonesia) Bhayangkara Presisi
	FW	Irfan Jauhari	31 January 2001 (age 25)	0	0	(Football Association of Indonesia) Persis

== Venues ==
All matches of the tournament will be played at the Jalak Harupat Stadium and Gelora Bung Karno Stadium, except for the game between Oxford United and ISL All Stars, which will be played in the Gelora Bung Karno Stadium in Jakarta, owing to the larger capacity and the inherent massiveness of the EFL Championship club.

Bandung	2025 Piala Presiden (Indonesia) is located in West Java
Jalak Harupat Stadium	2025 Piala Presiden (Indonesia) is located in West Java
Capacity: 27,000	2025 Piala Presiden (Indonesia) is located in West Java
Jakarta	2025 Piala Presiden (Indonesia) is located in West Java
Gelora Bung Karno Stadium	2025 Piala Presiden (Indonesia) is located in West Java
Capacity: 77,193	2025 Piala Presiden (Indonesia) is located in West Java

== Schedule ==
The schedule of the competition is as follows.

Stage	Round	Date
Group stage	Matchday 1	6 July 2025
Group stage	Matchday 2	8 July 2025
Group stage	Matchday 3	10 July 2025
Third place play-off		12 July 2025
Final		13 July 2025

== Group stage ==
Six teams were drawn into two groups of three. The group stage will follow a single round-robin format. The winners of each group will advance to the final, while the runners-up will advance to the Third place play-off.

=== Tiebreakers ===
The teams are ranked according to points (3 points for a win, 1 point for a draw, 0 points for a loss). If tied on points, tiebreakers are applied in the following order:

1. Points in head-to-head matches among tied teams;
2. Goal difference in head-to-head matches among tied teams;
3. Goals scored in head-to-head matches among tied teams;
4. If more than two teams were tied, and after applying all head-to-head criteria above, a subset of teams were still tied, all head-to-head criteria above were reapplied exclusively to this subset of teams;
5. Goal difference in all group matches;
6. Goals scored in all group matches;
7. Disciplinary points (yellow card = 1 point, red card as a result of two yellow cards = 3 points, direct red card = 3 points, yellow card followed by direct red card = 4 points);
8. Drawing of lots.

=== Group A ===
Pos	Team	Pld	W	D	L	GF	GA	GD	Pts	Qualification
1	(England) Oxford United	2	2	0	0	10	3	+7	6	Advance to the Final
2	Liga Indonesia All-Stars	2	0	1	1	5	8	−3	1	Advance to the Third place play-off
3	(Indonesia) Arema	2	0	1	1	2	6	−4	1	

Source: Piala Presiden 2025
Rules for classification: Tiebreakers
6 July 2025
19:30

Oxford United (England)	6–3	Liga Indonesia All-Stars
Harris 2', 30'; Helik 45'; Bradshaw 53'; Płacheta 56'; Keersmaecker 68'	Report	Simanjuntak 14'; Rizky Dwi 75'; Runtukahu 81'

Gelora Bung Karno Stadium, Jakarta
Attendance: 41,026
Referee: Muhammad Taqi (Singapore)

8 July 2025
15:30

Liga Indonesia All-Stars	2–2	(Indonesia) Arema
Witan 74' (pen.); David Maulana 86' (pen.)	Report	S.Tuharea 19'; Dedik S. 65'

Jalak Harupat Stadium, Bandung
Attendance: 3,714
Referee: Naufal Adya Fairuski (Indonesia)

10 July 2025
19:30

Arema (Indonesia)	0–4	(England) Oxford United
	Report	Płacheta 31'; Romeny 34'; Snowden 43'; O'Donkor 70'

Jalak Harupat Stadium, Bandung
Attendance: 9,137
Referee: Wiwat Jumpaoon (Thailand)

=== Group B ===
Pos	Team	Pld	W	D	L	GF	GA	GD	Pts	Qualification
1	(Thailand) Port	2	2	0	0	4	1	+3	6	Advance to the Final
2	(Indonesia) Dewa United	2	0	1	1	2	3	−1	1	Advance to the Third place play-off
3	(Indonesia) Persib (H)	2	0	1	1	1	3	−2	1	

Source: Piala Presiden 2025
Rules for classification: Tiebreakers
(H) Hosts
6 July 2025
15:30

Persib	0–2	Port
	Report	Bordin 45+4'; Peeradol 67' (pen.)

Jalak Harupat Stadium, Bandung
Attendance: 19,711
Referee: Firdavs Norsafarov (Uzbekistan)

8 July 2025
19:30

Persib	1–1	Dewa United
Wiliam Marcílio 65'	Report	Egy MV 90+2' (pen.)

Jalak Harupat Stadium, Bandung
Attendance: 19,652
Referee: Asker Najafaliev (Uzbekistan)

10 July 2025
15:30

Dewa United	1–2	Port
S.Lilipaly 10'	Report	Pato 45+2'; I. Fandi 90+4'

Jalak Harupat Stadium, Bandung
Attendance: 4,573
Referee: Razlan Joffri Ali (Malaysia)

== Third place play-off ==
The third place play-off match will be played as a single match. If tied after regulation time, extra time would not be played, and a match would go straight to a penalty shoot-out to determine the winner.

12 July 2025
19:30

Liga Indonesia All-Stars	0–2	(Indonesia) Dewa United
	Report	Marukawa 60'; Alex M. 68'

Jalak Harupat Stadium, Bandung
Attendance: 4,553
Referee: Yudi Nurcahya (Indonesia)

== Final ==
The final match will be played as a single match. If tied after regulation time, extra time would not be played, and a match would go straight to a penalty shoot-out to determine the winner.

13 July 2025
19:30

Oxford United (England)	1–2	(Thailand) Port
Harris 10'	Report	Teerasak 44'; Perea 48'

Jalak Harupat Stadium, Bandung
Attendance: 15,358
Referee: Firdavs Norsafarov (Uzbekistan)

== Statistics ==
=== Goalscorers ===
There were 29 goals scored in 8 matches, for an average of 3.62 goals per match.

3 goals

- (Wales) Mark Harris

2 goals

- (Poland) Przemysław Płacheta

1 goal

- (Belgium) Brian De Keersmaecker
- (Brazil) Alex Martins
- (Brazil) Matheus Pato
- (Brazil) Wiliam Marcílio
- (Colombia) Brayan Perea
- (England) Gatlin O'Donkor
- (England) Leo Snowden
- (England) Tom Bradshaw
- (Indonesia) David Maulana
- (Indonesia) Dedik Setiawan
- (Indonesia) Egy Maulana Vikri
- (Indonesia) Eksel Runtukahu
- (Indonesia) Ole Romeny
- (Indonesia) Riko Simanjuntak
- (Indonesia) Rizky Dwi Febrianto
- (Indonesia) Salim Tuharea
- (Indonesia) Stefano Lilipaly
- (Indonesia) Witan Sulaeman
- (Japan) Taisei Marukawa
- (Poland) Michał Helik
- (Singapore) Irfan Fandi
- (Thailand) Bordin Phala
- (Thailand) Peeradol Chamrasamee
- (Thailand) Teerasak Poeiphimai

=== Awards ===
- Best referee was awarded to Yudi Nurcahya.
- Top scorer was awarded to Mark Harris (Oxford United) with three goals.
- Best young player was awarded to Leo Snowden (Oxford United).
- Best player was awarded to Bordin Phala (Port).

=== Tournament team rankings ===
As per statistical convention in football, matches decided in extra time were counted as wins and losses, while matches decided by penalty shoot-outs were counted as draws.

Pos	Team	Pld	W	D	L	GF	GA	GD	Pts	Final result
1	Port	3	3	0	0	6	2	+4	9	Champion
2	Oxford United	3	2	0	1	11	5	+6	6	Runner-up
3	Dewa United	3	1	1	1	4	3	+1	4	Third place
4	Liga Indonesia All-Stars	3	0	1	2	5	10	−5	1	Fourth place
5	Persib	2	0	1	1	1	3	−2	1	Eliminated in the group stage
6	Arema	2	0	1	1	2	6	−4	1	Eliminated in the group stage

Source: Group stage, Third place play-off, Final

== See also ==
- 2025–26 Super League
