= Ricki Ariansyah =

Indonesian footballer (born 1997)

Personal information
- Full name: Ricki Ariansyah
- Date of birth: 10 June 1997 (age 29)
- Place of birth: Medan, Indonesia
- Height: 1.67 m (5 ft 6 in)
- Position: Defensive midfielder

Team information
- Current team: PSIS Semarang
- Number: 19

Youth career
- 2016: PSMS Medan

Senior career*
Years	Team	Apps	(Gls)
2017	Pro Duta	1	(0)
2018	PSCS Cilacap	9	(0)
2019	Perserang Serang	7	(0)
2020	PSCS Cilacap	0	(0)
2021	Persijap Jepara	9	(4)
2022	Persita Tangerang	17	(1)
2022–2024	Madura United	38	(2)
2024–2026	Semen Padang	52	(1)
2026–	PSIS Semarang	4	(0)
- * Club domestic league appearances and goals as of 21 November 2026

Ricki Ariansyah (born 10 June 1997) is an Indonesian professional footballer who plays as a defensive midfielder for Championship club PSIS Semarang.

== Club career ==
=== PSCS Cilacap ===
Ariansyah signed with PSCS Cilacap to play in the Indonesian Liga 2 for the 2020 season. This season was suspended on 27 March 2020 due to the COVID-19 pandemic. The season was abandoned and was declared void on 20 January 2021.

=== Persijap Jepara ===
In 2021, Ariansyah signed a contract with Indonesian Liga 2 club Persijap Jepara. He made his league debut on 27 September 2021 in a match against Hizbul Wathan at the Manahan Stadium, Surakarta.

=== Persita Tangerang ===
He was signed for Persita Tangerang to play in Liga 1 in the 2021 season. Ariansyah made his league debut on 7 January 2022 in a match against Persib Bandung at the Ngurah Rai Stadium, Denpasar.

=== Madura United ===
Ariansyah was signed for Madura United to play in Liga 1 in the 2022–23 season. He made his league debut on 23 July 2022 in a match against Barito Putera at the Gelora Ratu Pamelingan Stadium, Pamekasan.

== Career statistics ==
=== Club ===
As of 21 November 2026

Club	Season	League			Cup		Continental		Other		Total	
Club	Season	Division	Apps	Goals	Apps	Goals	Apps	Goals	Apps	Goals	Apps	Goals
Pro Duta	2017	Liga 2	1	0	0	0	–		0	0	1	0
PSCS Cilacap	2018	Liga 3	9	0	0	0	–		0	0	9	0
Perserang Serang	2019	Liga 2	7	0	0	0	–		0	0	7	0
PSCS Cilacap	2020	Liga 2	0	0	0	0	–		0	0	0	0
Persijap Jepara	2021	Liga 2	9	4	0	0	–		0	0	9	4
Persita Tangerang	2021–22	Liga 1	17	1	0	0	–		0	0	17	1
Madura United	2022–23	Liga 1	16	2	0	0	–		4 (Note: Appearances in Indonesia President's Cup)	0	20	2
Madura United	2023–24	Liga 1	22	0	0	0	–		0	0	22	0
Semen Padang	2024–25	Liga 1	29	0	0	0	–		0	0	29	0
Semen Padang	2025–26	Super League	23	1	0	0	–		0	0	23	1
PSIS Semarang	2026–27	Championship	4	0	0	0	–		0	0	4	0
Career total			137	8	0	0	0	0	4	0	141	8
