= Matheus Blade =

Brazilian footballer

Personal information
- Full name: Matheus da Conceição Nascimento
- Date of birth: 15 May 1995 (age 31)
- Place of birth: Cabo Frio, Brazil
- Height: 1.88 m (6 ft 2 in)
- Positions: Centre-back; defensive midfielder

Team information
- Current team: Arema
- Number: 25

Youth career
- Cabofriense

Senior career*
Years	Team	Apps	(Gls)
2016–2017	Cabofriense	1	(0)
2016	→ Madureira (loan)	0	(0)
2017	→ Olaria (loan)	0	(0)
2018–2019	Barretos	15	(1)
2018	→ Francana (loan)	18	(0)
2019–2025	Noroeste	96	(6)
2023	→ Maringá (loan)	9	(0)
2024	→ ABC (loan)	13	(2)
2025	→ Confiança (loan)	4	(0)
2025	→ Amazonas (loan)	3	(0)
2025–	Arema	38	(2)
- * Club domestic league appearances and goals as of 17:47, 20 November 2026 (UTC)

Matheus da Conceição Nascimento (born 15 May 1995), known as Matheus Blade or just Blade, is a Brazilian footballer who plays for Super League club Arema. Mainly a centre-back, he can also play as a defensive midfielder.

== Club career ==
Nicknamed after Wesley Snipes' character Blade, he was born in Cabo Frio, Rio de Janeiro, and began his career with hometown side Cabofriense. He subsequently served loans at Madureira and Olaria, but failed to appear with both sides.

In 2018, Blade signed for Barretos, but also did not feature and moved on loan to Francana. Upon returning in December, he became a regular starter before joining Noroeste for the 2019 Copa Paulista.

Blade established himself as an undisputed starter for Norusca in the following years, and renewed his contract until 2025 on 11 April 2023. The following day, he was announced at Maringá on loan.

Back to Noroeste for the 2024 season, Blade was loaned to ABC on 29 April of that year. On 15 November, he returned to his parent club for the 2025 Campeonato Paulista.

On 8 August 2025, Blade officially signed for Indonesian club Arema.

== Career statistics ==
As of 20 November 2026

Club	Season	League			State League		Cup		Continental		Other		Total	
Club	Season	Division	Apps	Goals	Apps	Goals	Apps	Goals	Apps	Goals	Apps	Goals	Apps	Goals
Cabofriense	2016	Carioca	—		1	0	—		—		—		1	0
Madureira (loan)	2016	Série D	0	0	—		—		—		—		1	0
Olaria (loan)	2017	Carioca Série B1	—		0	0	—		—		—		0	0
Barretos	2018	Paulista A3	—		0	0	—		—		—		0	0
Barretos	2019	Paulista A3	—		15	1	—		—		—		15	1
Barretos	Total		—		15	1	—		—		—		15	1
Francana (loan)	2018	Paulista 2ª Divisão	—		18	0	—		—		—		18	0
Noroeste	2019	Paulista A3	—		—		—		—		6 (Note: Appearance(s) in Copa Paulista)	0	6	0
Noroeste	2020	Paulista A3	—		18	0	—		—		—		18	0
Noroeste	2021	Paulista A3	—		15	0	—		—		8	0	23	0
Noroeste	2022	Paulista A3	—		19	1	—		—		7	0	26	1
Noroeste	2023	Paulista A2	—		14	3	—		—		6	3	20	6
Noroeste	2024	Paulista A2	—		20	2	—		—		—		20	2
Noroeste	2025	Paulista	—		10	0	—		—		—		10	0
Noroeste	Total		—		96	6	—		—		21	3	117	9
Maringá (loan)	2023	Série D	9	0	—		2	0	—		—		11	0
ABC (loan)	2024	Série C	13	2	—		—		—		—		13	2
Arema	2025–26	Super League	30	1	—		—		—		—		30	1
Arema	2026–27	Super League	8	1	—		0	0	—		5 (Note: Appearances in Piala Presiden)	0	13	1
Arema	Total		38	2	—		0	0	—		5	0	43	2
Career total			60	4	130	7	2	0	0	0	26	3	218	14
