= Yuda Editya =

Indonesian footballer (born 2004)

Personal information
- Full name: Yuda Editya Pratama
- Date of birth: 3 May 2004 (age 22)
- Place of birth: Grobogan, Indonesia
- Height: 1.81 m (5 ft 11 in)
- Positions: Forward; winger

Youth career
- Ganesha FC
- PPLP Central Java
- 2020–2021: Borneo Youth

Senior career*
Years	Team	Apps	(Gls)
2022–2024	Borneo Samarinda	0	(0)
2022	→ Serpong City (loan)	7	(3)
2023–2024	→ Madura United (loan)	15	(1)
2024–2026	Madura United	5	(0)
- * Club domestic league appearances and goals as of 23:57, 16 October 2025 (UTC)

Yuda Editya Pratama (born 3 May 2004), is an Indonesian professional footballer who plays as a forward or winger.

== Club career ==
=== Borneo Samarinda ===
Born in 2004, Yuda started his career at a soccer school in Grobogan Regency called Ganesha FC, then after entering high school, he joined PPLP Central Java, then he joined Borneo Youth in 2020. He was promoted to the senior team in 2022.

==== Serpong City (loan) ====
On 7 September 2022, Yuda was signed for Serpong City to play in Liga 3 in the 2022–23 season, on loan from Borneo Samarinda. He made his club debut on 3 October 2022 in a 6–0 home win against Banten Jaya in the 2022 Liga 3 Banten.

==== Madura United (loan) ====
In June 2023, Yuda signed a contract with Madura United, on loan from Borneo Samarinda. He made his Liga 1 debut on 23 July 2023 in a 4–3 home win against Persis Solo. In the 8th minute of the match against PSS Sleman on 24 September 2023, Yuda was lying on the field after being hit by a free kick from Jonathan Bustos. The medical team then went into the field and opened Yuda's mouth to prevent oxygen deprivation. Yuda was treated and taken to hospital by ambulance.

== Honours ==
=== Club ===
Serpong City

- Liga 3 Banten zone: 2022
