= Pablo Oliveira (footballer, born 1995) =

Brazilian footballer

Personal information
- Full name: Gildson Pablo de Oliveira Silva
- Date of birth: 24 May 1995 (age 31)
- Place of birth: Natal, Rio Grande do Norte, Brazil
- Height: 1.83 m (6 ft 0 in)
- Position: Midfielder

Senior career*
Years	Team	Apps	(Gls)
2015	Santa Cruz de Natal	6	(0)
2016	Globo	21	(4)
2016	América de Natal	2	(0)
2017	Globo	16	(2)
2017–2018	Guarani	5	(0)
2019	São Caetano	11	(1)
2019	→ Botafogo (SP) (loan)	17	(0)
2020	Ferroviária	3	(0)
2020–2021	Brasil de Pelotas	17	(0)
2021–2022	Tombense	7	(0)
2022	→ Primavera (loan)	15	(0)
2022–2023	Chapecoense	32	(1)
2024	Sampaio Corrêa	16	(1)
2024–2026	Arema	30	(3)
- * Club domestic league appearances and goals as of 10 March 2026

Gildson Pablo de Oliveira Silva (born 24 May 1995), commonly known as Pablo Oliveira, is a Brazilian professional footballer who plays as a midfielder.

== Club career ==
Born in Natal, Rio Grande do Norte, Brazil, he joined several local Brazilian clubs. And finally decided to go abroad for the first time to Indonesia and joined Liga 1 side Arema in the 2024–25 season. During his career in Brazil, he made 100 appearances with 6,048 minutes played.

=== Arema ===
He was signed for Arema and played in Liga 1 in 2024–2025 season. Pablo made his league debut on 17 August 2024 as a starter in a 0–2 lose over Borneo Samarinda. On 15 September 2024, he picked up his first win with Arema in his fourth appearances in a 0–1 away win over PSM Makassar. On 10 February 2025, he scored his first league goal for Arema, as they drew 1–1 against PSM Makassar at Gelora Supriyadi Stadium. Two weeks later, Pablo scored the opening goal in a 2–2 draw over PSIS Semarang. On 9 March 2025, Pablo scored equalizer in a 1–3 away win over Persija Jakarta. On 28 April 2025, Pablo extended his contract with the club for one season. On 12 June 2026, Pablo officially left Arema.
