= Riyatno Abiyoso =

Indonesian footballer

Personal information
- Full name: Riyatno Abiyoso
- Date of birth: 18 January 1999 (age 27)
- Place of birth: Purworejo, Indonesia
- Height: 1.65 m (5 ft 5 in)
- Position: Winger

Team information
- Current team: PSIM Yogyakarta
- Number: 27

Youth career
- 2017–2019: Persela Lamongan

Senior career*
Years	Team	Apps	(Gls)
2019–2022	Persela Lamongan	43	(6)
2022–2025	Persik Kediri	58	(8)
2023–2024	→ Madura United (loan)	15	(1)
2025–	PSIM Yogyakarta	23	(1)
- * Club domestic league appearances and goals as of 5 September 2026

Riyatno Abiyoso (born 18 January 1999) is an Indonesian professional footballer who plays as a winger for Super League club PSIM Yogyakarta.

== Club career ==
=== Persela Lamongan ===
He was signed for Persela Lamongan to play in Liga 1 in the 2019 season. Abiyoso made his debut on 27 October 2019 in a match against Kalteng Putra. On 16 December 2019, he scored his first goal for Persela in a 1–1 draw over TIRA-Persikabo at the Pakansari Stadium. Five days later, Abiyoso scored the opening goal in a 2–0 win over Semen Padang. Abiyoso finished the season with two goal in 10 league appearances, and for the 2020 season, Abiyoso only played 3 times for the club because the league was officially discontinued due to the COVID-19 pandemic.

Abiyoso started and played the whole 90 minutes for the first time in Liga 1 in a 0–1 lose against Persita Tangerang on 17 September 2021. Abiyoso scored his first league goals of the season in a 1–1 draw over PS Barito Putera, scoring an opening goal, on 29 October. Abiyoso finished the season with 4 goals in 30 appearances.

=== Persik Kediri ===
Abiyoso was signed for Persik Kediri to play in Liga 1 in the 2022–23 season. Abiyoso made his league debut on 25 July 2022 in a match against Persita Tangerang at the Indomilk Arena, Tangerang. On 18 August 2022, Abiyoso scored his first league goal for Persik Kediri in a 2–1 lose over PSIS Semarang at Jatidiri Stadium.

On 19 January 2023, Abiyoso scored the winning goal in a 2–3 away win over Bhayangkara. Five days later, Abiyoso scored in a 2–0 win over Madura United; which made Persik Kediri win 2 times in a row in Liga 1. On 9 February 2023, Abiyoso scored in a 2–1 lose over PSS Sleman. On 13 June 2025, Abiyoso officially left Persik Kediri.

=== PSIM Yogyakarta ===
On 28 June 2025, Abiyoso officially signed with Liga 1 club PSIM Yogyakarta.

== Career statistics ==
=== Club ===
As of 5 September 2026

Club	Season	League			Cup		Continental		Other		Total	
Club	Season	Division	Apps	Goals	Apps	Goals	Apps	Goals	Apps	Goals	Apps	Goals
Persela Lamongan	2019	Liga 1	10	2	0	0	–		0	0	10	2
Persela Lamongan	2020	Liga 1	3	0	0	0	–		0	0	3	0
Persela Lamongan	2021–22	Liga 1	30	4	0	0	–		4 (Note: Appearances in Menpora Cup.)	0	34	4
Persela Lamongan	Total		43	6	0	0	–		4	0	47	6
Persik Kediri	2022–23	Liga 1	23	4	0	0	–		2 (Note: Appearances in Indonesia President's Cup)	0	25	4
Persik Kediri	2023–24	Liga 1	6	0	0	0	–		0	0	6	0
Persik Kediri	2024–25	Liga 1	29	4	0	0	–		0	0	29	4
Persik Kediri	Total		58	8	0	0	–		2	0	60	8
Madura United (loan)	2023–24	Liga 1	15	1	0	0	–		0	0	15	1
PSIM Yogyakarta	2025–26	Super League	22	1	0	0	–		0	0	22	1
PSIM Yogyakarta	2026–27	Super League	1	0	0	0	–		0	0	1	0
Career total			139	16	0	0	–		6	0	145	16
