= Wiliam Marcílio =

Brazilian footballer

Personal information
- Full name: Wiliam Moreira da Silva Marcílio
- Date of birth: 31 August 1996 (age 30)
- Place of birth: Rio de Janeiro, Brazil
- Height: 1.77 m (5 ft 10 in)
- Position: Attacking midfielder

Team information
- Current team: Chungnam Asan FC
- Number: 50

Senior career*
Years	Team	Apps	(Gls)
2015–2016	Nova Iguaçu	23	(8)
2018	Metalist 1925 Kharkiv	0	(0)
2019–2020	Angra dos Reis	12	(0)
2020	CSE	4	(0)
2020–2021	Itabaiana	13	(6)
2021–2023	Tombense	5	(1)
2021	→ Luverdense (loan)	0	(0)
2021	→ Itabaiana (loan)	0	(0)
2021–2022	América de Natal	11	(1)
2022–2023	Retrô	6	(0)
2023–2024	Naxxar Lions	19	(4)
2024–2025	Arema	19	(5)
2025	Persib Bandung	7	(0)
2026–	Chungnam Asan FC	1	(0)
- * Club domestic league appearances and goals as of 2 March 2026

Wiliam Moreira da Silva Marcílio (born 31 August 1996), is a Brazilian professional footballer who plays as an attacking midfielder for Chungnam Asan FC.

== Club career ==
Born in Rio de Janeiro, Brazil, Marcílio started off career in the Brazilian club Nova Iguaçu. Then, he decided to go abroad for the first time to Ukraine with joined Metalist 1925 Kharkiv in 2018.

In November 2021, he joined América de Natal on a free transfer. Marcílio signed a contract with Retrô for the 2023 campaign.

=== Naxxar Lions ===
On 13 April 2023, Marcílio signed a contract with Maltese club, Naxxar Lions. He made his league debut for Naxxar Lions in a 5–1 lose against Marsaxlokk on 16 September 2023. On 5 November 2023, he scored his first goal for Naxxar Lions with scored a brace in a 1–2 away win against Balzan.

=== Arema ===
On 1 July 2024, he was signed for Arema and played in Liga 1 in 2024–2025 season. Marcílio made his Arema debut in a pre-season 2024 Piala Presiden, coming as a substitutes in second half for Julián Guevara in a 1–0 win against Bali United. On 26 July 2024, he scored his first goal for Arema, as they win 5–0 against Madura United and led Arema to the semifinals of the 2024 Piala Presiden. He brought Arema back to win the Piala Presiden for the fourth time, for him, he has felt the title with Arema for the first time. Marcílio made his league debut on 12 August 2024, coming on as a starter, in a 0–0 draw against Dewa United. On 19 October 2024, he scored his first league goal for Arema with scored a brace in a 3–1 home win against Malut United. Marcílio was named player of the month for October and November 2024. In May 2025, Arema announced it would not extend Marcilio's contract. During the 2024–25 season he made 19 league appearances for Arema, scoring 5 goals.

=== Persib Bandung ===
On 24 June 2025, Marcílio signed a two-years contract with Persib Bandung. Marcílio chose 10 as his squad number. On 6 July 2025, he made his Persib debut in a pre-season 2025 Piala Presiden, coming as a starter in a 0–2 lose against Thai League 1 club Port.

== Honours ==
América (RN)

- Série D: 2022

Arema

- Piala Presiden: 2024

Individual

- Liga 1 Player of the Month: October & November 2024
