= Odivan Koerich =

Brazilian footballer

Personal information
- Full name: Odivan Koerich
- Date of birth: 12 January 1999 (age 27)
- Place of birth: Paraná, Brazil
- Height: 1.90 m (6 ft 3 in)
- Position: Centre-back

Senior career*
Years	Team	Apps	(Gls)
2019–2022	Juventude	3	(0)
2021	→ Operário Ferroviário (loan)	12	(0)
2022	Paraná	6	(0)
2023–2025	Náutico	11	(0)
2025–2026	Arema	8	(0)
- * Club domestic league appearances and goals as of 2 February 2026

Odivan Koerich (born 12 January 1999), is a Brazilian professional footballer who plays as a centre-back.

== Club career ==
Born in Paraná, Brazil, he joined several local Brazilian clubs. And he decided to go abroad for the first time to Indonesia and joined Liga 1 side Arema for 2025–26 season. During his career in Brazil, he played total 15 games with Juventude and Operário Ferroviário in Série B without scoring, played 11 games in Série C, 11 games in Campeonato Pernambucano with Náutico, and 6 games in Série D with Paraná.

=== Arema ===
On 30 June 2025, he signed a contract with Liga 1 club Arema, he has just started his career in the Indonesian Liga 1 and Arema is his first team. He was predicted as a replacement for Choi Bo-kyung who officially left the team.

== Personal life ==
Born in Brazil, Koerich is of Italian descent.

== Career statistics ==
=== Club ===
As of match played 2 February 2026

Club	Season	League			Cup (Note: Includes Copa do Brasil and Copa do Nordeste)		Continental		Other		Total	
Club	Season	Division	Apps	Goals	Apps	Goals	Apps	Goals	Apps	Goals	Apps	Goals
Juventude	2020	Série B	3	0	1	1	0	0	1 (Note: Appearances in Campeonato Gaúcho)	0	5	1
Juventude	2021	Série B	0	0	0	0	0	0	0	0	0	0
Juventude	2022	Série B	0	0	0	0	0	0	1 (Note: Appearances in Campeonato Gaúcho)	0	1	0
Operário Ferroviário (loan)	2021	Série B	12	0	0	0	0	0	4 (Note: Appearances in Campeonato Paranaense)	0	16	0
Paraná	2022	Série D	6	0	0	0	–		0	0	6	0
Náutico	2023	Série C	10	0	9	0	0	0	8 (Note: Appearances in Campeonato Pernambucano)	0	27	0
Náutico	2024	Série C	0	0	0	0	0	0	0	0	0	0
Náutico	2025	Série C	1	0	2	0	0	0	3 (Note: Appearances in Campeonato Pernambucano)	0	6	0
Arema	2025–26	Super League	8	0	0	0	–		2 (Note: Appearances in Piala Presiden)	0	10	0
Career total			40	0	12	1	0	0	19	0	71	1
