= Dwiki Mardiyanto =

Indonesian footballer

Personal information
- Full name: Dwiki Mardiyanto
- Date of birth: 21 March 2000 (age 26)
- Place of birth: Surabaya, Indonesia
- Height: 1.63 m (5 ft 4 in)
- Positions: Forward; right winger

Team information
- Current team: Persiraja Banda Aceh (on loan from Arema)
- Number: 17

Youth career
- 2018–2020: Persebaya Surabaya U20
- 2020–2021: PON Jatim

Senior career*
Years	Team	Apps	(Gls)
2021–2022	Persikab Bandung		(11)
2022–2025	Deltras	37	(6)
2025–	Arema	4	(0)
2026–	→ Persiraja Banda Aceh (loan)	1	(0)
- * Club domestic league appearances and goals as of 13 September 2026

Dwiki Mardiyanto (born 21 March 2000) is an Indonesian professional footballer who plays as a forward or right winger for Championship club Persiraja Banda Aceh, on loan from Super League side Arema.

== Early and youth career ==
Mardiyanto began his football development within the youth academy system of Persebaya Surabaya. In 2019, alongside future senior international players like Rizky Ridho and Arief Catur, he successfully helped guide the Persebaya Surabaya U20 squad to clinch the Elite Pro Academy U20 national championship title. Following his youth career, he was selected to represent the East Java regional team (PON Jatim) for the 2021 National Sports Week campaign.

== Club career ==
=== Persikab Bandung ===
Mardiyanto launched his senior career by joining Persikab Bandung to compete in the 2021 Liga 3 season. He enjoyed a highly successful individual campaign, finishing as the absolute top scorer of the Liga 3 West Java zone after netting 11 goals to claim the golden boot. His offensive partnership upfront became the catalyst that successfully secured Persikab's promotion to the professional tier of Liga 2.

=== Deltras ===
In 2022, Mardiyanto moved back to East Java to sign a multi-year contract with Deltras. Over his three-season stay with the Sidoarjo-based club, he established himself as a prominent winger in the second tier, recording 37 league appearances and scoring 6 goals before the conclusion of his contract in early 2025.

=== Arema ===
Ahead of the 2025–26 Super League season, Mardiyanto completed a top-flight transfer to Arema. He recorded 4 substitute appearances in the first tier during the later stage of the season, registering a decisive match-winning assist during a 2–1 victory against Persik Kediri.

==== Persiraja Banda Aceh (loan) ====
To guarantee more regular playing time, Arema agreed to send Mardiyanto on a season-long loan to Persiraja Banda Aceh running until June 2027 to strengthen their forward options for the 2026–27 Championship campaign.
