= Abdul Rahman (footballer, born 2002) =

Indonesian footballer

Personal information
- Full name: Abdul Rahman
- Date of birth: 1 August 2002 (age 24)
- Place of birth: Karimun, Indonesia
- Height: 1.73 m (5 ft 8 in)
- Positions: Right winger; forward

Team information
- Current team: PSM Makassar
- Number: 81

Youth career
- 2019–2020: Badak Lampung

Senior career*
Years	Team	Apps	(Gls)
2021–2023	Serpong City	14	(5)
2023–2024	RANS Nusantara	23	(2)
2024–	PSM Makassar	45	(4)

International career^{‡}
2023	Indonesia U23	3	(0)
Medal record
Men's football
Representing Indonesia
AFF U-23 Championship
Runner-up	2023 Thailand	Team
- * Club domestic league appearances and goals as of 2 February 2026 ‡ National team caps and goals as of 26 August 2023

Abdul Rahman (born 1 August 2002) is an Indonesian professional footballer who plays as a right winger or a forward for Super League club PSM Makassar.

== Club career ==
=== RANS Nusantara ===
Abdul Rahman was signed for RANS Nusantara to play in Liga 1 in the 2023–24 season. He made his debut on 3 July 2023 in a match against Persikabo 1973 at the Maguwoharjo Stadium, Sleman.

== Honours ==
=== Club ===
Serpong City

- Liga 3 Banten: 2022

=== International ===
Indonesia U23

- AFF U-23 Championship runner-up: 2023
