= Walisson Maia =

Brazilian footballer

Personal information
- Full name: Walisson Moreira Farias Maia
- Date of birth: 21 August 1991 (age 35)
- Place of birth: Natividade, Brazil
- Height: 1.87 m (6 ft 2 in)
- Position: Centre-back

Team information
- Current team: Arema
- Number: 5

Youth career
- Toledo
- Pato Branco
- Coritiba

Senior career*
Years	Team	Apps	(Gls)
2011–2019	Coritiba	46	(1)
2012	→ Ituano (loan)	0	(0)
2012	→ Fortaleza (loan)	0	(0)
2012	→ ASA (loan)	6	(1)
2013	→ J. Malucelli (loan)	0	(0)
2013	→ Boa Esporte (loan)	8	(0)
2014	→ Atlético Sorocaba (loan)	0	(0)
2018	→ Vitória (loan)	13	(0)
2020	Água Santa	11	(0)
2020	Botafogo-SP	24	(1)
2021	Vila Nova	16	(0)
2021–2022	Al-Fahaheel	28	(0)
2022	SHB Đà Nẵng	13	(0)
2023–2024	Criciúma	60	(0)
2025–2026	Vila Nova	30	(0)
2026–	Arema	16	(1)
- * Club domestic league appearances and goals as of 20 November 2026

Walisson Moreira Farias Maia (born 21 August 1991) is a Brazilian footballer who plays as a centre-back for Super League club Arema.

== Club career ==
Born in Natividade, Tocantins, Walisson graduated with Coritiba's youth setup. On 5 June 2011 he made his first team – and Série A – debut, starting in a 5–1 home routing over Vasco da Gama.

After being demoted to the reserves, Walisson was subsequently loaned to Ituano, Fortaleza, ASA, J. Malucelli, Boa Esporte and Atlético Sorocaba. With the Alagoas club he scored his first professional goal, netting his side's first in a 2–3 away loss against Boa for the Série B championship on 7 September 2012.

On 29 September 2014 Walisson was again promoted to the main squad, along with fellow youth graduate Rafhael Lucas.

In January 2018, having renewed his Coritiba contract until the end of 2019, he joined Vitória for the 2018 season.

== Career statistics ==
As of 12 June 2019

Club	Season	League			State League		Cup		Conmebol		Other		Total	
Club	Season	Division	Apps	Goals	Apps	Goals	Apps	Goals	Apps	Goals	Apps	Goals	Apps	Goals
Coritiba	2011	Série A	1	0	0	0	0	0	—		—		1	0
Coritiba	2014	Série A	0	0	4	0	0	0	—		—		4	0
Coritiba	2015	Série A	16	0	1	0	1	0	—		—		18	0
Coritiba	2016	Série A	15	1	10	0	0	0	1 (Note: Appearance in 2016 Copa Sudamericana.)	0	3 (Note: Appearances in 2016 Primeira Liga.)	0	29	1
Coritiba	2017	Série A	11	0	12	1	2	0	—		—		25	1
Coritiba	2018	Série B	0	0	2	0	—		—		—		2	0
Coritiba	2019	Série B	3	0	0	0	0	0	—		—		3	0
Coritiba	Total		46	1	29	1	3	0	1	0	3	0	82	2
Ituano (loan)	2012	Paulista	—		0	0	—		—		—		0	0
Fortaleza (loan)	2012	Série C	0	0	—		1	0	—		—		1	0
ASA (loan)	2012	Série B	6	1	—		—		—		—		6	1
J. Malucelli (loan)	2013	Paranaense	—		9	0	—		—		—		9	0
Boa Esporte (loan)	2013	Série B	8	0	—		—		—		—		8	0
Atlético Sorocaba (loan)	2014	Paulista	—		3	0	—		—		—		3	0
Vitória (loan)	2018	Série A	2	0	7	0	2	0	—		2 (Note: Appearances in 2018 Copa do Nordeste.)	0	13	0
Career Total			62	2	48	1	6	0	1	0	5	0	122	3

== Honours ==
Criciúma

- Recopa Catarinense: 2024
