= Ian Puleio =

Argentine footballer (born 1998)

Personal information
- Full name: Ian Lucas Puleio Araya
- Date of birth: 19 July 1998 (age 28)
- Place of birth: Buenos Aires, Argentina
- Height: 1.77 m (5 ft 9 1/2 in)
- Position: Winger

Team information
- Current team: Vardar
- Number: 34

Youth career
- Vélez Sarsfield

Senior career*
Years	Team	Apps	(Gls)
2017–2023	Platense	3	(0)
2021	→ Toreros (loan)	13	(4)
2022	→ San Miguel (loan)	16	(1)
2022	→ Colegiales (loan)	3	(0)
2023–2025	Excursionistas	29	(6)
2024	→ Arsenal Tivat (loan)	15	(5)
2024	→ Dečić (loan)	29	(0)
2025–2026	Arema	15	(2)
2026–	Vardar	1	(0)
- * Club domestic league appearances and goals as of 28 February 2026

Ian Lucas Puleio Araya (born 19 July 1998) is an Argentine professional footballer who plays as a winger for Macedonian First Football League club Vardar.

== Club career ==
Born in Buenos Aires, Argentina, Puleio started his career in the youth team of Vélez Sarsfield, then joined Platense at the age of 17, and was also selected to play for the reserve team in 2017, where he spent the last two seasons in the fourth division. On 29 May 2019, he signed his first professional contract. Puleio had made his debut under Fernando Ruiz, it came in the match played on 14 September 2019, in a 2–0 loss to Alvarado. He was substituted in the 71st minute for Joaquín Susvielles.

In May 2021, he was loaned to Toreros in Ecuador, the following season, he returned to his country and was loaned again to San Miguel and Colegiales in 2022.

In February 2023, Puleio joined Excursionistas. In December 2023, he officially extended his contract until 2025. However, the club's official press release announced that he would be loaned to Arsenal Tivat in Montenegro for the next six months. On 17 February 2024, he scored his first league goal in his debut match for Arsenal Tivat against Jezero in a 3–1 home win. A month later, he scored the winning goal for the club in a 1–2 away win over Mladost DG. In July 2024, he joined Dečić, still on loan from Excursionistas. Puleio made his club debut as a substituted on 10 July 2024, in a 0–3 loss to Welsh club The New Saints in the first leg of 2024–25 UEFA Champions League qualifying.
