= Dalberto =

Brazilian footballer (born 1994)

Personal information
- Full name: Dalberto Luan Belo
- Date of birth: 15 September 1994 (age 32)
- Place of birth: Bento Fernandes, Brazil
- Height: 1.82 m (6 ft 0 in)
- Position: Forward

Team information
- Current team: DPMM FC
- Number: 94

Youth career
- América de Natal

Senior career*
Years	Team	Apps	(Gls)
2013–2014	América de Natal	2	(0)
2014	Bonsucesso	0	(0)
2014	São João da Barra	0	(0)
2016	Alecrim	10	(4)
2016–2017	ABC	52	(10)
2018	Mirassol	8	(0)
2018	→ Londrina (loan)	2	(0)
2018	→ Sampaio Corrêa (loan)	6	(0)
2018–2022	Juventude	62	(10)
2019	→ Chapecoense (loan)	10	(0)
2020–2021	→ Sport Recife (loan)	22	(4)
2021	→ Coritiba (loan)	16	(0)
2022	CSA	12	(2)
2023	Paysandu	15	(0)
2023–2024	Madura United	18	(6)
2024–2026	Arema	61	(34)
2026–	DPMM	6	(5)
- * Club domestic league appearances and goals as of 20 November 2026

Dalberto Luan Belo (born 15 September 1994), simply known as Dalberto, is a Brazilian professional footballer who plays as a forward for Bruneian club DPMM FC of the Malaysia Super League.

== Club career ==
=== Brazil ===
Born in Bento Fernandes, Rio Grande do Norte, Dalberto started his career with América de Natal in 2013, after being approved on a trial. In early 2014, however, he was released after playing just one match for the first team, and subsequently represented Bonsucesso and São João da Barra.

Ahead of the 2016 season, after nearly one year of inactivity, Dalberto joined Alecrim after a trial period. On 11 May of that year, he moved to ABC, and helped the club in their promotion to the Série B.

In December 2017, after being ABC's top goalscorer in the second division, Dalberto agreed to a deal with Mirassol. He subsequently served loan stints at Londrina and Sampaio Corrêa, being rarely used in both stints; he then returned to Mirassol in for the 2016 Copa Paulista, but still rescinded his contract at the end of the year.

On 20 December 2018, Dalberto was presented at Juventude. He helped the club in their promotion to division two, and moved to Série A side Chapecoense on loan in September 2019. Dalberto made his top tier debut on 29 September, starting in a 1–1 away draw against Athletico Paranaense but was replaced with only 11 minutes due to an injury. He managed 10 appearances with the Verdão as they suffered relegation to the Série B.

After an impressive campaign back with Juventude in the 2020 Série B season, Dalberto was signed on loan by Sport Club do Recife and played 15 top-flight games with them as they managed to steer off relegation. He canceled the loan in order to move to Coritiba in a similar deal in April 2021.

At the end of 2021, Maceió club side CSA welcomed Dalberto after the end of his contract with Juventude. The club struggled all season and by June, Dalberto had fallen out of favour with newly-appointed trainer Alberto Valentim who took over from Mozart, resulting in a transfer to Série C team Paysandu the following month.

In only his sixth match for Paysandu on 27 August 2022 against former team ABC, Dalberto suffered a knee injury that forced him out of the game for nine months. He recovered well and stayed for another season until his release in November 2023, managing 15 appearances for the team from Pará state.

=== Indonesia ===
Dalberto went abroad for the first time of his career shortly after his release, signing for Madura United under head coach Maurício Souza. He scored on his debut in a 4–1 win over Barito Putera on 10 December. Coming into the team midway through the season, he helped Madura clinch fourth place in the regular table and subsequently the runner–up position in the 2023–24 Liga 1, after losing to Persib Bandung in the final.

In July 2024, Arema FC unveiled the signing of Dalberto after he was waived by Madura United at the end of the previous season. In the pre-season President's Cup tournament the following month, Dalberto and his team went all the way to the final where he converted his spot-kick in an eventual penalty shoot-out victory.

In the 2024–25 season, Dalberto produced an impressive strike rate of a goal every two games to place himself amongst the top goalscorers of the Liga 1. He would continue to improve his scoring rate in the following season, beginning with a hat-trick against PSBS Biak in the first Arema fixture on 11 August. He managed to score 19 goals in 28 games, only four goals away from top-scorer David da Silva, aiding Arema to successive mid-table finishes in the league.

=== Brunei ===
In July 2026, Dalberto signed for DPMM FC, a club from Brunei that play in the Malaysia Super League, after initial interest from Bhayangkara. He formally signed his contract on 22 July. He made his first DPMM appearance on 23 August as a starter against Penang, assisting Miguel Oliveira for the only goal of the game. it was not until 18 October when he scored his first two goals for DPMM in a 3–2 win against Kuching City.

== Honours ==
ABC

- Campeonato Potiguar: 2017

Madura United

- Indonesia Liga 1: 2024 (runner-up)

Arema

- Piala Presiden: 2024
