= Syaeful Anwar =

Indonesian footballer

Personal information
- Full name: Syaeful Anwar
- Date of birth: 1 December 1995 (age 30)
- Place of birth: Banjarnegara, Indonesia
- Height: 1.88 m (6 ft 2 in)
- Position: Defender

Team information
- Current team: Kendal Tornado
- Number: 15

Youth career
- 2012–2014: Persib Bandung

Senior career*
Years	Team	Apps	(Gls)
2014–2015	Persib Bandung	0	(0)
2015–2016	Bali United	0	(0)
2016–2017	Persibat Batang	11	(0)
2017–2018	PSPS Riau	20	(0)
2018–2020	Semen Padang	28	(0)
2020–2022	Persita Tangerang	29	(0)
2022–2025	Arema	25	(0)
2026–	Kendal Tornado	2	(0)
- * Club domestic league appearances and goals as of 3 May 2026

Syaeful Anwar (born 1 December 1995) is an Indonesian professional footballer who plays as a defender for Championship club Kendal Tornado.

== Club career ==
=== Bali United ===
Syaeful made his professional debut with Bali United in President Cup 2015. But soon after his contract was terminated because of long-term injury.

=== Persibat Batang ===
In 2017, Syaeful Anwar signed a contract with Indonesian Liga 2 club Persibat Batang.

=== Semen Padang ===
He joined Semen Padang who competed for Liga 2 in February 2018. He played only for 2 matches in his first season while Semen Padang FC getting promoted to Liga 1. On 16 August 2019, Syaeful made his Liga 1 debut against PSIS Semarang.

=== Persita Tangerang ===
In 2020, Syaeful Anwar signed a one-year contract with Indonesian Liga 1 club Persita Tangerang. This season was suspended on 27 March 2020 due to the COVID-19 pandemic. The season was abandoned and was declared void on 20 January 2021.

=== Arema ===
On 27 April 2022, Anwar announced by Arema to join the squad. On 14 June 2025, Syaeful Anwar officially left Arema.

== Honours ==
Semen Padang

- Liga 2 runner-up: 2018

Arema

- Indonesia President's Cup: 2022, 2024
