= Gelora Supriyadi Stadium =

Football stadium in Blitar, Indonesia

Coordinates: 8°05′35″S 112°10′07″E

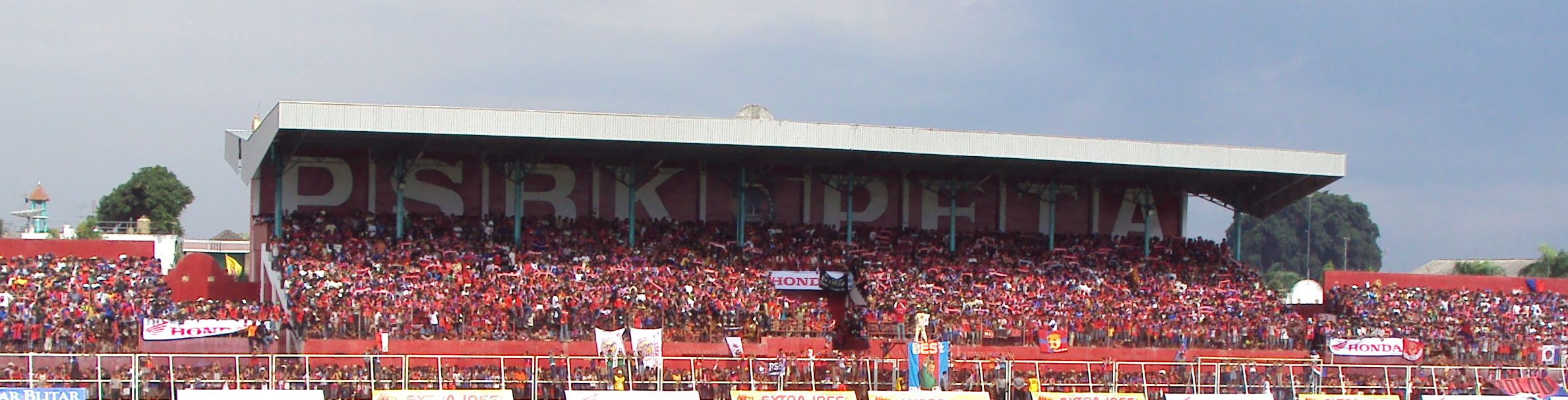
- Interactive map of Gelora Supriyadi Stadium
- Location: Blitar, East Java, Indonesia
- Owner: Government of Blitar City
- Operator: Government of Blitar City
- Capacity: 15,000
- Surface: Grass field

Tenants
- PSBK Blitar; Blitar United; Arema (2024–2025); Persik Kediri (temporary)

Gelora Supriyadi Stadium is a football stadium in the city of Blitar, Indonesia. The stadium has a capacity of 15,000 people.

It is the home base of PSBK Blitar and Blitar United.

== History ==
In August 2026, the stadium was chosen as the home base of Tri Brata Rafflesia now known as Putra Sang Fajar for the 2026–27 Liga Nusantara season.
