= Thales Lira =

Brazilian footballer

Personal information
- Full name: Thales Natanael Lira de Matos
- Date of birth: 6 April 1993 (age 33)
- Place of birth: Porto Alegre, Brazil
- Height: 1.88 m (6 ft 2 in)
- Position: Centre-back

Senior career*
Years	Team	Apps	(Gls)
2013–2020	Internacional	19	(1)
2015	→ Bahia (loan)	18	(1)
2015–2016	→ Atlético Goianiense (loan)	3	(0)
2017–2018	→ CSA (loan)	33	(4)
2019	→ Vitória (loan)	8	(0)
2019	→ Criciúma (loan)	14	(1)
2019–2020	→ Paraná (loan)	7	(0)
2020	Paraná	10	(0)
2020	Ankaraspor	7	(0)
2021	Guarani	38	(1)
2022	Operário Ferroviário	30	(1)
2022–2023	CSA	7	(1)
2023–2024	PSS Sleman	30	(3)
2024–2026	Arema	29	(2)
2025–2026	→ Persija Jakarta (loan)	20	(0)
- * Club domestic league appearances and goals as of 5 April 2026

Thales Natanael Lira de Matos (born 6 April 1993) is a Brazilian professional footballer who plays as a centre-back.

== Career ==
Born in Porto Alegre, Brazil, he joined several local Brazilian clubs, and finally decided to go abroad for the first time to Turkey and joined TFF First League side Ankaraspor in the 2020 season.

=== Guarani ===
Ahead of 2021 season, Thales decided to return to Brazil and signed a contract with Guarani. He made his league debut on 29 May 2021 in a match against Vitoria at the Estádio Brinco de Ouro. On 16 October 2021, Thales scored his first league goal for Guarani, opening the scoring in a 2–2 draw against Clube de Regatas Brasil. He contributed with 33 Série B appearances, scored one goal during his 2021 season.

=== Operário Ferroviário ===
On 8 December 2021, Thales signed a one-year contract with Operário Ferroviário. He made his league debut on 10 April 2022 in a match against Tombense. Six days later, Thales scored his first league goal for Operário Ferroviário in a 2–0 home win against Ponte Preta. He contributed with 17 Série B appearances, scored one goal during his 2022 season.

=== Return to CSA ===
On 15 December 2022, CSA announced a deal for Thales to join on a free transfer. He made his club debut on 22 January 2023 in a match against Fluminense PI. On 25 January, Thales scored his first goal for CSA in a 4–0 home win against Murici. Thales contributed with only 7 appearances in all competitions, and scored one goal during his 2022–23 season.

=== PSS Sleman ===
On 29 April 2023, Thales went abroad to Southeast Asia and signed a contract with Liga 1 club PSS Sleman, he last defended the Brazilian club Centro Sportivo Alagoano (CSA) in the 2023 season. Thales made his Liga 1 debut on 1 July 2023 as a starter in a 1–0 away win over Bali United.

== Honours ==
Atlético Goianiense

- Campeonato Brasileiro Série B: 2016

Arema

- Piala Presiden: 2024
