= Achmad Maulana =

Indonesian footballer

Personal information
- Full name: Achmad Maulana Syarif
- Date of birth: 24 April 2003 (age 23)
- Place of birth: Subang, Indonesia
- Height: 1.82 m (6 ft 0 in)
- Position: Full-back

Team information
- Current team: Arema
- Number: 19

Youth career
- 2021–2023: Persija Jakarta

Senior career*
Years	Team	Apps	(Gls)
2021–2024	Persija Jakarta	0	(0)
2021–2022	→ Persikasi Bekasi (loan)	7	(1)
2023–2024	→ Arema (loan)	28	(0)
2024–	Arema	39	(1)

International career^{‡}
2022–2023	Indonesia U20	13	(0)
2023–2025	Indonesia U23	5	(0)
2024–	Indonesia	2	(0)
Medal record
Men's football
Representing Indonesia
ASEAN U-23 Championship
Runner-up	2025 Indonesia	Team
- * Club domestic league appearances and goals as of 20 November 2026 ‡ National team caps and goals as of 29 July 2025

Achmad Maulana Syarif (born 24 April 2003) is an Indonesian professional footballer who plays as a full-back for Super League club Arema and the Indonesia national team.

== Club career ==
=== Persija Jakarta ===
Maulana's career began as part of the Persija youth team, and in the 2022–23 season, he promoted to the senior squad.

==== Loan to Arema ====
Maulana was signed for Arema to play in Liga 1 in the 2023–24 season, on loan from Persija Jakarta. He made his debut on 2 July 2023 in a match against Dewa United at the Indomilk Arena, Tangerang.

== International career ==
On 16 September 2022, Maulana made his debut for Indonesia U-20 national team against Hong Kong U-20, in a 5–1 win in the 2023 AFC U-20 Asian Cup qualification.

In October 2022, it was reported that Mualana received a call-up from the Indonesia U-20 for a training camp, in Turkey and Spain.

In January 2023, Maulana was called up by Shin Tae-Yong to the Indonesia under-20 team for the training centre in preparation for 2023 AFC U-20 Asian Cup.

On 25 November 2024, Maulana received a called up to the preliminary squad to the Indonesia national team for the 2024 ASEAN Championship.

== Career statistics ==
=== International ===
As of match played 21 December 2024

Appearances and goals by national team and year
National team	Year	Apps	Goals
Indonesia	2024	2	0
Total		2	0

== Honours ==
Arema

- Piala Presiden: 2024

Indonesia U23

- ASEAN U-23 Championship runner-up: 2025
