= Flabio Soares =

Indonesian footballer (born 1999)

Personal information
- Full name: Flabio Soares
- Date of birth: 2 February 1999 (age 27)
- Place of birth: Maliana, Timor Timur, Indonesia (now East Timor)
- Height: 1.62 m (5 ft 4 in)
- Position: Winger

Team information
- Current team: Deltras

Youth career
- Bintang Timur Academy
- 2021: PON East Nusa Tenggara

Senior career*
Years	Team	Apps	(Gls)
2021–2022	Serpong City	18	(0)
2022–2023	Putra Delta Sidoarjo	6	(1)
2023–2025	Arema	16	(0)
2025–	Deltras	12	(1)
- * Club domestic league appearances and goals as of 28 March 2026

Flabio Soares (born 2 February 1999) is an Indonesian professional footballer who plays as a winger for Deltras.

== Club career ==
Soares started his professional career by joining Liga 3 club Serpong City to play in 2021–22 Liga 3.

=== Putra Delta Sidoarjo ===
In August 2022, Soares signed a contract with Liga 2 club Putra Delta Sidoarjo. He made his club debut in a 3–0 win against PSBS Biak on 30 August 2022. On 11 September 2022, Soares scored his first goal for the club in a 3–2 home win over Persiba Balikpapan. In his first season with Putra Delta Sidoarjo, Soares only went on to make 6 appearances and scored one goal, because Liga 2 was suspended due to a tragedy.

=== Arema ===
On 12 May 2023, Soares signed a contract with Liga 1 club Arema. He made his Liga 1 debut in a 1–3 lose over Bali United on 21 July 2023. On 14 June 2025, Soares officially left Arema.

== Career statistics ==
=== Club ===
As of 28 March 2026

Club	Season	League			Cup		Continental		Other (Note: Appearances in Piala Presiden)		Total	
Club	Season	Division	Apps	Goals	Apps	Goals	Apps	Goals	Apps	Goals	Apps	Goals
Serpong City	2021–22	Liga 3	18	0	0	0	0	0	0	0	18	0
Putra Delta Sidoarjo	2022–23	Liga 2	6	1	0	0	0	0	0	0	6	1
Arema	2023–24	Liga 1	15	0	0	0	0	0	0	0	15	0
Arema	2024–25	Liga 1	1	0	0	0	0	0	1	1	2	1
Arema	Total		16	0	0	0	—		1	1	17	1
Deltras	2025–26	Liga 2	12	1	0	0	0	0	0	0	12	1
Career total			52	2	0	0	0	0	1	1	53	3

== Honours ==
Arema

- Piala Presiden: 2024
