= Arkhan Fikri =

Indonesian footballer

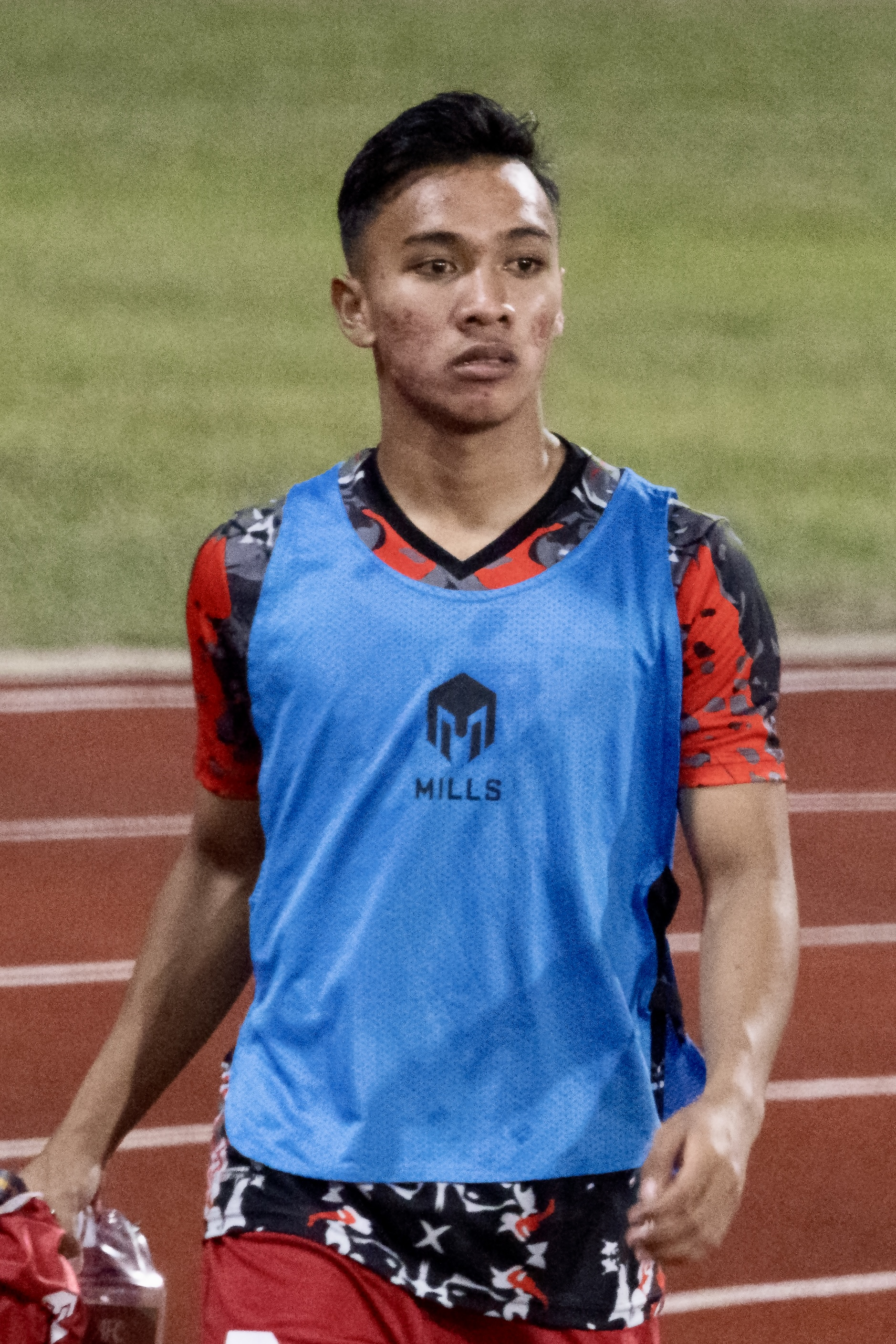
- Fikri with Indonesia in 2023

Personal information
- Full name: Arkhan Fikri
- Date of birth: 28 December 2004 (age 21)
- Place of birth: Serdang Bedagai, Indonesia
- Height: 1.65 m (5 ft 5 in)
- Position: Midfielder

Team information
- Current team: Arema
- Number: 8

Youth career
- –2017: PS Kwarta
- 2018: PSSA Asahan
- 2019–2020: Barito Putera

Senior career*
Years	Team	Apps	(Gls)
2021–2022	PS Kwarta		
2022–	Arema	108	(4)

International career^{‡}
2022–2023	Indonesia U20	19	(3)
2023–	Indonesia U23	18	(2)
2023–	Indonesia	8	(0)
Medal record
Men's football
Representing Indonesia
ASEAN U-23 Championship
Runner-up	2023 Thailand	Team
Runner-up	2025 Indonesia	Team
- * Club domestic league appearances and goals as of 20 November 2026 ‡ National team caps and goals as of 13 October 2025

Arkhan Fikri (born 28 December 2004) is an Indonesian professional footballer who plays as a midfielder for Super League club Arema and the Indonesia national team.

== Club career ==
=== Arema ===
Fikri was signed for Arema to play in Liga 1 in the 2022–23 season. Arkhan made his first-team debut on 13 August 2022 as a substitute in a match against Bali United at the Kapten I Wayan Dipta Stadium, Gianyar when he was 17th years old. On 24 August 2022, he became the "first-eleven" for the first time in a winning match against RANS Nusantara, substituted by Gian Zola in the second half.

== International career ==
On 30 May 2022, Fikri made his debut for an Indonesian youth team against a Venezuela U-20 squad in the 2022 Maurice Revello Tournament in France.

On 4 July 2022, scored against Brunei U-19 in a 7–0 win in the 2022 AFF U-19 Youth Championship.

In October 2022, it was reported that Fikri received a call-up from the Indonesia U-20 for a training camp, in Turkey and Spain.

In August 2023, Fikri was called up to the Indonesia U-23 for the training centre in preparation for 2023 AFF U-23 Championship. On 18 August 2023, Fikri made his international U-23 debut against a Malaysia U-23 in the 2023 AFF U-23 Championship.

On 17 October 2023, Fikri made his senior team debut against Brunei in the 2026 FIFA World Cup qualifying.

On 25 November 2024, Fikri received a called up to the preliminary squad to the Indonesia national team for the 2024 ASEAN Championship.

== Career statistics ==
=== Club ===
As of 20 November 2026

Appearances and goals by club, season and competition
Club	Season	League		Cup		League cup		Continental		Other (Note: Appearances in Piala Presiden)		Total	
Club	Season	Apps	Goals	Apps	Goals	Apps	Goals	Apps	Goals	Apps	Goals	Apps	Goals
Arema	2022–23	16	0	—		—		—		0	0	16	0
Arema	2023–24	26	0	—		—		—		0	0	26	0
Arema	2024–25	29	2	—		—		—		5	0	34	2
Arema	2025–26	27	2	—		—		—		0	0	27	2
Arema	2026–27	10	0	—		1	0	—		4	0	15	0
Career total		108	4	0	0	1	0	0	0	9	0	118	4

=== International ===
As of match played 21 December 2024

Appearances and goals by national team and year
National team	Year	Apps	Goals
Indonesia	2023	4	0
Indonesia	2024	4	0
Total		8	0

== Honours ==
Arema

- Piala Presiden: 2024

Indonesia U23

- AFF U-23 Championship runner-up: 2023, 2025

Individual

- U-15 Soeratin Cup Best Player: 2019
- AFF U-23 Championship Most Valuable Player: 2023
- AFF U-23 Championship Team of the Tournament: 2023
- Piala Presiden Best Young Player: 2024
- Liga 1/Super League Young Player of the Month: February 2025, March 2025, April 2025
- Liga 1 Best Young Player: 2024–25
- APPI Indonesian Football Award Best Young Footballer: 2024–25
- Super League Goal of the Month: November 2025
