= Charles Lokolingoy =

Congolese professional footballer (born 1997)

Personal information
- Full name: Charles Lokolingoy
- Date of birth: 2 March 1997 (age 29)
- Place of birth: Kinshasa, Zaire
- Height: 1.88 m (6 ft 2 in)
- Position: Forward

Team information
- Current team: Chungnam Asan
- Number: 97

Youth career
- Sutherland Sharks

Senior career*
Years	Team	Apps	(Gls)
2015	Sutherland Sharks	14	(0)
2016–2019	Sydney FC NPL	42	(34)
2017–2019	Sydney FC	13	(0)
2019	Brisbane Roar	5	(0)
2019	Brisbane Roar NPL	1	(2)
2019	Sutherland Sharks	11	(7)
2019	Pegasus	7	(4)
2020	Sydney Olympic	13	(5)
2021	Marconi Stallions	17	(7)
2021	Wellington Phoenix	9	(0)
2022	Marconi Stallions	17	(7)
2022–2023	Żebbuġ Rangers	26	(11)
2023–2025	Arema	62	(20)
2025–	Chungnam Asan	40	(13)
- * Club domestic league appearances and goals as of 16 August 2026

Charles Lokolingoy (born 2 March 1997) is an Australian professional footballer who plays for South Korean club Chungnam Asan as a forward.

== Early life ==
Lokolingoy was born in the Zaire, and moved to Australia at the age of 11.

== Club career ==
=== Sutherland Sharks ===
Lokolingoy started his career at Sutherland Sharks, playing for them for two seasons before joining Sydney FC.

=== Sydney FC ===
In February 2017, Lokolingjoy was promoted by Sydney FC to the first team. He was released by Sydney FC on the transfer deadline day.

=== Brisbane Roar ===
A couple of weeks after his deadline day release from Sydney FC, Lokolingjoy joined Brisbane Roar for the remainder of the season, together with Ruon Tongyik. On 30 April 2019, it was announced that Lokolingjoy would not be continuing with Brisbane Roar, along with another 13 players.

=== Return to Sutherland Sharks ===
A week after his release by Brisbane Roar, Lokolingoy was signed by his former club Sutherland Sharks.

=== Pegasus ===
In August 2019, Lokolingoy signed for Hong Kong Premier League club Pegasus. He scored during his debut for the club. On 22 December 2019, Loklingoy left the club since he could not adapt to the climate of Hong Kong.

=== Sydney Olympic ===
In January 2020, Lokolingoy signed with Sydney Olympic for the season.

== International career ==
In 2015, Lokolingoy was called up to represent the Australian under-23 team.

== Honours ==
Sydney FC

- A-League Premiership: 2017–18
- FFA Cup: 2017

Arema

- Piala Presiden: 2024

Individual

- Piala Presiden Best Player: 2024
