= 2024 Piala Presiden (Indonesia) =

Indonesia President's Cup

Tournament details
- Country: Indonesia
- Dates: 19 July – 4 August 2024
- Teams: 8

Final positions
- Champions: Arema (4th title)
- Runners-up: Borneo Samarinda
- Third place: Persis
- Fourth place: Persija

Tournament statistics
- Matches played: 16
- Goals scored: 41 (2.56 per match)
- Attendance: 74,971 (4,686 per match)
- Top goal scorers: (Australia) Charles Lokolingoy; (Brazil) Léo Gaúcho; (Indonesia) Ramadhan Sananta; (3 goals each)

Awards
- Best player: Charles Lokolingoy
- Best young player: Arkhan Fikri

The 2024 Piala Presiden (English: 2024 Indonesia President's Cup) was the 6th edition of Piala Presiden, held by the Football Association of Indonesia (PSSI) as a pre-season tournament for the 2024–25 Liga 1. This tournament was also a trial for several new regulations that were planned to be implemented in the Liga 1, one of which was the application of Video Assistant Referee (VAR).

The tournament began on 19 July 2024. The final was played at Manahan Stadium, Surakarta, on 4 August 2024.

Arema were the defending champions after defeating Borneo Samarinda 1–0 on aggregate in the finals previous edition.

== Teams ==
The following 8 teams that will participate for the tournament.

Team	Appearance	Last appearance	Previous best performance	2023–24 season league ranking
Arema	6th	2022	Winners (2017, 2019, 2022)	15th in Liga 1
Bali United	6th	2022	Runners-up (2018)	4th in Liga 1
Borneo Samarinda	6th	2022	Runners-up (2017, 2022)	3rd in Liga 1
Madura United	6th	2022	Semi-finals (2019)	2nd in Liga 1
Persib	6th	2022	Winners (2015)	1st in Liga 1
Persija	6th	2022	Winners (2018)	8th in Liga 1
Persis	2nd	2022	Group stage (2022)	7th in Liga 1
PSM	6th	2022	Quarter-finals (2015, 2022)	11th in Liga 1

== Venues ==
Jalak Harupat Stadium and Kapten I Wayan Dipta Stadium will be used for group stage matches. Manahan Stadium will be used for knockout stage matches.

Bandung	Surakarta	Gianyar
Jalak Harupat Stadium	Manahan Stadium	Kapten I Wayan Dipta Stadium
Capacity: 27,000	Capacity: 20,000	Capacity: 18,000
Location of the stadiums of the 2024 Indonesia President's Cup

== Format ==
In this tournament, 8 teams were drawn into two groups of four. The group stage will be a single round-robin format, with the top two teams from each group advancing to the semi-finals. The knockout stage match will be played as a single match.

== Group stage ==
Group winners and runners-up advanced to the semi-finals.

=== Group A ===
Pos	Team	Pld	W	D	L	GF	GA	GD	Pts	Qualification
1	Borneo Samarinda	3	2	1	0	4	1	+3	7	Advance to knockout stage
2	Persis	3	1	1	1	3	4	−1	4	Advance to knockout stage
3	Persib (H)	3	1	0	2	2	2	0	3	
4	PSM	3	0	2	1	3	5	−2	2	

Source: Piala Presiden 2024
Rules for classification: 1) Points; 2) Head-to-head points; 3) Head-to-head goal difference; 4) Head-to-head goals scored; 5) Goal difference; 6) Goals scored; 7) Fair-play points; 8) Draw.
(H) Hosts
19 July 2024
15:30

Persib	2–0	PSM
Ciro 15'; Hajleta 42' (o.g.)	Report

Jalak Harupat Stadium, Bandung
Attendance: 9,557
Referee: Rio Permana Putra (Pekanbaru)
19 July 2024
19:30

Borneo Samarinda	2–0	Persis
L. Gaúcho 45+1', 52'	Report

Jalak Harupat Stadium, Bandung
Attendance: 0
Referee: Naufal Adya Fairuski (Bandung)

22 July 2024
15:30

Persis	2–2	PSM
Sananta 1', 40'	Report	Y. Fernandes 59'; A. Rahman 68'

Jalak Harupat Stadium, Bandung
Attendance: 884
Referee: Heru Cahyono (South Jakarta)
22 July 2024
19:30

Persib	0–1	Borneo Samarinda
	Report	Berguinho 90+2'

Jalak Harupat Stadium, Bandung
Attendance: 5,496
Referee: M. Erfan Effendi (Surabaya)

25 July 2024
15:30

Borneo Samarinda	1–1	PSM
D. Kuswardani 90+7'	Report	Latyr 17'

Jalak Harupat Stadium, Bandung
Attendance: 687
Referee: Aprisman Aranda (Padang Panjang)
25 July 2024
19:30

Persib	0–1	Persis
	Report	Sananta 20'

Jalak Harupat Stadium, Bandung
Attendance: 9,174
Referee: Candra (Padang)

=== Group B ===
Pos	Team	Pld	W	D	L	GF	GA	GD	Pts	Qualification
1	Arema	3	2	1	0	8	2	+6	7	Advance to knockout stage
2	Persija	3	1	1	1	4	6	−2	4	Advance to knockout stage
3	Madura United	3	1	0	2	4	9	−5	3 (Note: Head-to-head result: Bali United 2–3 Madura United.)	
4	Bali United (H)	3	1	0	2	5	4	+1	3	

Source: Piala Presiden 2024
Rules for classification: 1) Points; 2) Head-to-head points; 3) Head-to-head goal difference; 4) Head-to-head goals scored; 5) Goal difference; 6) Goals scored; 7) Fair-play points; 8) Draw.
(H) Hosts
Notes:
21 July 2024
15:30 (16:30 UTC+8)

Bali United	0–1	Arema
	Report	S. Tuharea 11'

Kapten I Wayan Dipta Stadium, Gianyar
Attendance: 3,942
Referee: Nendi Rohaendi (Bandung)
21 July 2024
19:30 (20:30 UTC+8)

Madura United	1–2	Persija
Haudi 6'	Report	Simanjuntak 42'; Gustavo 67'

Kapten I Wayan Dipta Stadium, Gianyar
Attendance: 640
Referee: Tommi Manggopa (Bolaang Mongondow)

24 July 2024
15:30 (16:30 UTC+8)

Bali United	2–3	Madura United
Maruoka 9' (pen.); Privat 45+3'	Report	Noriki 1'; Maxuel 84', 87'

Kapten I Wayan Dipta Stadium, Gianyar
Attendance: 3,292
Referee: Sance Lawita (Manado)
24 July 2024
19:30 (20:30 UTC+8)

Persija	2–2	Arema
Gustavo 84'; Hanif 87'	Report	S. Tuharea 54'; Lokolingoy 67'

Kapten I Wayan Dipta Stadium, Gianyar
Attendance: 993
Referee: Yudi Nurcahya (Bandung)

26 July 2024
15:30 (16:30 UTC+8)

Madura United	0–5	Arema
	Report	Dalberto 23', 45+3'; Wiliam 73'; Dedik S. 90'; Soares 90+3'

Kapten I Wayan Dipta Stadium, Gianyar
Attendance: 471
Referee: Ginanjar Rahman Latief (Bandung)
26 July 2024
19:30 (20:30 UTC+8)

Bali United	3–0	Persija
Wilson 20'; Made Tito 58'; M. Rahmat 63'	Report

Kapten I Wayan Dipta Stadium, Gianyar
Attendance: 4,447
Referee: Asep Yandis (Karawang)

== Knockout stage ==
The knockout stage matches will be played as a single match. If tied after regulation time, extra time would not be played, and a match would go straight to a penalty shoot-out to determine the winner.

=== Bracket ===
Semi-finals
30 July – Surakarta
Borneo Samarinda	2
Persija	1
31 July – Surakarta
Persis	0
Arema	2

Final
4 August – Surakarta
Borneo Samarinda	1 (4)
Arema (p)	1 (5)
Third place play-off
3 August – Surakarta
Persis	1
Persija	0

=== Semi-finals ===
30 July 2024
19:30

Borneo Samarinda	2–1	Persija
Nduwarugira 44'; Gavin Kwan 90+6'	Report	Firza 15'

Manahan Stadium, Surakarta
Attendance: 7,926
Referee: Tommi Manggopa (Bolaang Mongondow)

31 July 2024
19:30

Persis	0–2	Arema
	Report	Lokolingoy 59', 82'

Manahan Stadium, Surakarta
Attendance: 11,227
Referee: Rio Permana Putra (Pekanbaru)

=== Third place play-off ===
3 August 2024
19:30

Persis	1–0	Persija
Ricardo Lima 10'	Report

Manahan Stadium, Surakarta
Attendance: 7,302
Referee: Yudi Nurcahya (Bandung)

=== Final ===
4 August 2024
19:30

Borneo Samarinda	1–1	Arema
L. Gaúcho 62'	Report	Wiliam 49'
Penalties
Berguinho (penalty scored); Nduwarugira (penalty scored); Ronaldo (penalty missed); Jusuf (penalty scored); L. Gaúcho (penalty scored)	4–5	(penalty scored) Lokolingoy; (penalty scored) Wiliam; (penalty scored) Julian G.; (penalty scored) Dalberto; (penalty scored) Frigeri

Manahan Stadium, Surakarta
Attendance: 8,933
Referee: Sance Lawita (Manado)

== Statistics ==
=== Goalscorers ===
There were 41 goals scored in 16 matches, for an average of 2.56 goals per match.

3 goals

- (Australia) Charles Lokolingoy
- (Brazil) Léo Gaúcho
- (Indonesia) Ramadhan Sananta

2 goals

- (Brazil) Dalberto
- (Brazil) Gustavo Almeida
- (Brazil) Maxuel
- (Brazil) Wiliam Marcílio
- (Indonesia) Salim Tuharea

1 goal

- (Australia) Brandon Wilson
- (Brazil) Berguinho
- (Brazil) Ciro Alves
- (Brazil) Ricardo Lima
- (Burundi) Christophe Nduwarugira
- (Cameroon) Privat Mbarga
- (Cape Verde) Yuran Fernandes
- (Indonesia) Abdul Rahman
- (Indonesia) Dedik Setiawan
- (Indonesia) Dika Kuswardani
- (Indonesia) Firza Andika
- (Indonesia) Flabio Soares
- (Indonesia) Gavin Kwan Adsit
- (Indonesia) Hanif Sjahbandi
- (Indonesia) Haudi Abdillah
- (Indonesia) Made Tito
- (Indonesia) Muhammad Rahmat
- (Indonesia) Riko Simanjuntak
- (Japan) Mitsuru Maruoka
- (Japan) Noriki Akada
- (Senegal) Latyr Fall

1 own goal

- (Slovenia) Nermin Haljeta (PSM, against Persib)

Source: PSSI

=== Awards ===
- Best referee was awarded to Yudi Nurcahya.
- Top scorer was awarded to Ramadhan Sananta (Persis) with three goals.
- Best young player was awarded to Arkhan Fikri (Arema).
- Best player was awarded to Charles Lokolingoy (Arema).

=== Tournament team rankings ===
As per statistical convention in football, matches decided in extra time were counted as wins and losses, while matches decided by penalty shoot-outs were counted as draws.

Pos	Grp	Team	Pld	W	D	L	GF	GA	GD	Pts	Final result
1	B	Arema	5	3	2	0	11	3	+8	11	Champion
2	A	Borneo Samarinda	5	3	2	0	7	3	+4	11	Runner-up
3	A	Persis	5	2	1	2	4	6	−2	7	Third place
4	B	Persija	5	1	1	3	5	9	−4	4	Fourth place
5	B	Bali United	3	1	0	2	5	4	+1	3	Eliminated in the group stage
6	A	Persib	3	1	0	2	2	2	0	3	Eliminated in the group stage
7	B	Madura United	3	1	0	2	4	9	−5	3	Eliminated in the group stage
8	A	PSM	3	0	2	1	3	5	−2	2	Eliminated in the group stage

Source: Group stage, Knockout stage

== See also ==
- 2024–25 Liga 1
