= Julián Guevara =

Colombian footballer (born 1992)

Personal information
- Full name: Sneyder Julián Guevara Muñoz
- Date of birth: 4 May 1992 (age 34)
- Place of birth: Cali, Colombia
- Height: 1.93 m (6 ft 4 in)
- Position: Midfielder

Team information
- Current team: Arema
- Number: 6

Youth career
- América de Cali

Senior career*
Years	Team	Apps	(Gls)
2016–2017	Naxxar Lions	21	(2)
2017–2018	PS Kemi	47	(1)
2018	Inter Turku	10	(0)
2019	América de Cali	17	(0)
2019–2020	Deportivo Pasto	16	(0)
2020–2021	Delfín	10	(0)
2021–2022	Alianza Petrolera	47	(1)
2023	Jaguares de Córdoba	38	(1)
2023–	Arema	71	(4)
- * Club domestic league appearances and goals as of 31 October 2026

Sneyder Julián Guevara Muñoz (born 4 May 1992) is a Colombian professional footballer who plays as a midfielder for Super League club Arema.

== Club career ==
Guevara joined Finnish side PS Kemi in 2017.

== Career statistics ==
=== Club ===
As of 3 November 2026

Club	Season	League			National Cup		Continental		Other		Total	
Club	Season	Division	Apps	Goals	Apps	Goals	Apps	Goals	Apps	Goals	Apps	Goals
Naxxar Lions	2016–17	Maltese First Division	21	2	0	0	—		—		21	2
PS Kemi	2017	Veikkausliiga	31	0	0	0	—		—		31	0
PS Kemi	2018	Veikkausliiga	16	1	2	0	—		—		18	1
PS Kemi	Total		47	1	2	0	—		—		49	1
Inter Turku	2018	Veikkausliiga	10	0	0	0	—		—		10	0
América de Cali	2019	Categoría Primera A	17	0	1	0	—		—		18	0
Deportivo Pasto	2019	Categoría Primera A	12	0	3	0	—		—		15	0
Deportivo Pasto	2020	Categoría Primera A	4	0	0	0	14 (Note: Includes Copa Sudamericana)	0	—		18	0
Deportivo Pasto	Total		16	0	3	0	14	0	—		33	0
Delfín	2020	Ecuadorian Serie A	10	0	0	0	—		—		10	0
Delfín	2021	Ecuadorian Serie A	0	0	0	0	—		—		0	0
Delfín	Total		10	0	0	0	—		—		10	0
Alianza	2021	Categoría Primera A	24	0	4	0	—		—		28	0
Alianza	2022	Categoría Primera A	23	1	2	0	—		—		25	1
Alianza	Total		47	1	6	0	—		—		53	1
Jaguares de Córdoba	2023	Categoría Primera A	38	1	5	1	—		—		43	2
Arema	2023–24	Liga 1	14	3	—		—		—		14	3
Arema	2024–25	Liga 1	31	0	—		—		5 (Note: Appearance(s) in Piala Presiden)	0	36	0
Arema	2025–26	Super League	21	0	—		—		2	0	23	0
Arema	2026–27	Super League	5	1	1	0	—		5	0	11	1
Arema	Total		71	4	1	0	—		12	0	84	4
Career total			279	9	18	1	14	0	12	0	323	10

== Honours ==
Arema

- Piala Presiden: 2024
