= Lucas Frigeri =

Brazilian footballer

Personal information
- Full name: Lucas Henrique Frigeri
- Date of birth: 15 June 1989 (age 37)
- Place of birth: Catanduva, Brazil
- Height: 1.94 m (6 ft 4 in)
- Position: Goalkeeper

Team information
- Current team: Isenmulang Kalteng
- Number: 1

Senior career*
Years	Team	Apps	(Gls)
2008–2011	Catanduvense	0	(0)
2008	→ Atlético Araçatuba (loan)	0	(0)
2010	→ Inter de Limeira (loan)	0	(0)
2012–2013	Luverdense	1	(0)
2016	Rio Claro	14	(0)
2017–2019	São Caetano	11	(0)
2017	→ Atlético Goianiense (loan)	0	(0)
2018	→ CSA (loan)	18	(0)
2019	→ Avai (loan)	4	(0)
2020–2021	Avai	36	(0)
2021	CSA	8	(0)
2022	Inter de Limeira	10	(0)
2022	Novorizontino	18	(0)
2023	Santo André	12	(0)
2023	Londrina	17	(0)
2023–2024	Madura United	18	(0)
2024–2026	Arema	54	(0)
2026–	Isenmulang Kalteng	0	(0)
- * Club domestic league appearances and goals as of 15 May 2026

Lucas Henrique Frigeri (born 15 June 1989) is a Brazilian professional footballer who plays as a goalkeeper for Super League club Isenmulang Kalteng.

== Honours ==
São Caetano

- Campeonato Paulista Série A2: 2017

Avai

- Campeonato Catarinense: 2019, 2021

Arema

- Piala Presiden: 2024

Individual

- Super League Save of the Month: April 2026
