= Salim Tuharea =

Indonesian footballer

Personal information
- Full name: Salim Akbar Tuharea
- Date of birth: 13 February 2004 (age 22)
- Place of birth: Tulehu, Indonesia
- Height: 1.75 m (5 ft 9 in)
- Position: Winger

Team information
- Current team: Arema
- Number: 11

Youth career
- 2019–2021: Ssb Maehanu Tulehu

Senior career*
Years	Team	Apps	(Gls)
2022–2023	Depok City	8	(0)
2023–2024	Madura United	21	(1)
2024–	Arema	43	(6)
Medal record
Men's football
Representing Indonesia
AFF U-23 Championship
Runner-up	2023 Thailand	Team
- * Club domestic league appearances and goals as of 20 November 2026

Salim Akbar Tuharea (born 13 February 2004) is an Indonesian professional footballer who plays as a winger for Super League club Arema.

== Club career ==
=== Madura United ===
Tuharea was signed for Madura United from Liga 3 club Depok City to play in Liga 1 in the 2022–23 season. He made his league debut on 31 March 2023 in a 1–3 home lose against PSM Makassar.

== Career statistics ==
=== Club ===
As of 20 November 2026

Club	Season	League		Cup		League cup		Continental		Other (Note: Appearances in Piala Presiden)		Total	
Club	Season	Apps	Goals	Apps	Goals	Apps	Goals	Apps	Goals	Apps	Goals	Apps	Goals
Depok City	2022	8	0	0	0	0	0	–		0	0	8	0
Madura United	2022–23	3	0	0	0	0	0	–		0	0	3	0
Madura United	2023–24	18	1	0	0	0	0	–		0	0	18	1
Madura United	Total	21	1	0	0	0	0	—		0	0	21	1
Arema	2024–25	26	6	0	0	0	0	–		5	2	31	8
Arema	2025–26	15	0	0	0	0	0	–		2	1	17	1
Arema	2026–27	2	0	0	0	1	0	–		2	1	5	1
Arema	Total	43	6	0	0	1	0	—		9	4	53	10
Career total		72	7	0	0	1	0	0	0	9	4	82	11

== Honours ==
Arema

- Piala Presiden: 2024

Indonesia U23

- AFF U-23 Championship runner-up: 2023
