= 2012 Indonesia Super League U-21 group stage =

The 2012 Indonesia Super League U-21 group stage is contested by a total of 19 teams. They include:

- 18 teams from Super League
- 1 teams from Premier Division

The group stage draw took place at the PT Liga Indonesia headquarters in Jakarta, Indonesia on March 23, 2012. The first round commenced on April 2, 2012, and concluded on April 25, 2012, while the second round began on May 9, 2012, and ended on May 24, 2012.

In each group, teams played each other in a home-and-away round-robin format, although all matches were held at a single stadium with a home team designated. The winners and runners-up from each group advanced to the second stage.

== Groups ==
Each team had been numbered from 1 to 4, the numbers determine the order of the fixtures:

- Match Day 1: 1 vs 4, 3 vs 2
- Match Day 2: 2 vs 1, 4 vs 3
- Match Day 3: 1 vs 3, 4 vs 2
- Match Day 4: 4 vs 1, 2 vs 3
- Match Day 5: 1 vs 2, 3 vs 4
- Match Day 6: 3 vs 1, 2 vs 4

=== Group A ===
Team	Pld	W	D	L	GF	GA	GD	Pts
Persita U-21	6	5	1	0	13	5	+8	16
Pelita Jaya U-21	6	2	2	2	10	8	+2	8
Persib U-21	6	2	1	3	8	8	0	7
Sriwijaya FC U-21	6	1	0	5	6	16	−6	3

2 April 2012
15:30 WIB

Persita U-21	3–0	Sriwijaya U-21
Makmun 58'; Al Achya 68', 86'	Report	(yellow card) 11' Efendi; (yellow card) 39' Halman

Krakatau Steel Stadium, Cilegon
Attendance: 295
Referee: Hadi Suroso
3 April 2012
15:30 WIB

Pelita U-21	0–1	Persib U-21
Tawakal (red card) 70'	Report	(yellow card) 25' Yogaswara; (yellow card) 43' Dinata; (yellow card) 62' Purnama; 84' Yogaswara

Krakatau Steel Stadium, Cilegon
Attendance: 989
5 April 2012
15:30 WIB

Sriwijaya U-21	2–3	Pelita U-21
Rifki 49'; Rotinsulu (yellow card) 50'; Putra 61'; Putra (yellow card) 79'	Report	6', 39' Maulana; (yellow card) 17' Armando; 31' Lestaluhu; (yellow card) 48' Prakoso

Krakatau Steel Stadium, Cilegon
Attendance: 355
6 April 2012
15:30 WIB

Persib U-21	0–2	Persita U-21
Yogaswara (yellow card) 27'; Suhandi (yellow card) 50'; Purnama (yellow card) 54'; Real (yellow card) 72'	Report	31', 46' Arvani; (yellow card) 51' Rico; (yellow card) 79' Egi; (yellow card) 88' M. Andi

Krakatau Steel Stadium, Cilegon
Attendance: 1,485
8 April 2012
15:30 WIB

Sriwijaya U-21	2–0	Persib U-21
Ahmad 24'; Halman (yellow card) 59'; Indriansyah (yellow card) 61'; Rifky 62'; Ibrahim (yellow card) 78'	Report	(yellow card) 31' Dinata

Krakatau Steel Stadium, Cilegon
Attendance: 325
9 April 2012
15:30 WIB

Persita U-21	3–2	Pelita U-21
Ferdiansyah (yellow card) 15'; Arvani 37', 60' (pen.); Aditya (yellow card) 75'; Makmun 82'	Report	(yellow card) 22' Permana; 50' (pen.) Maulana; (yellow card) 55' Hardiansyah; (yellow card) 62' Akbar; (red card) 64' Maulana; 90' Feriansyah

Krakatau Steel Stadium, Cilegon
Attendance: 136
Referee: Hadi Suroso
9 May 2012
15:30 WIB

Sriwijaya U-21	1–2	Persita U-21
Kurniawan 17'; Ibrahim (yellow card) 72'; Rifki (yellow card) 82'	Report	9' Ferdiansyah; 30' Al Achya; (yellow card) 34' Tanjung; (yellow card) 43' Makmun

Jakabaring Stadium, Palembang
Attendance: 213
9 May 2012
19:00 WIB

Persib U-21	1–1	Pelita U-21
Siswanto 80'	Report	(yellow card) 21' Riyandi; 46' Feriansyah

Jakabaring Stadium, Palembang
Attendance: 100
11 May 2012
15:30 WIB

Pelita U-21	3–0	Sriwijaya U-21
Tawakal (yellow card) 9'; Akbar (yellow card) 14'; Tuasykal (yellow card) 25'; Feriansyah 45'; Gumilang 46'; Gumilar 50'	Report	(yellow card) 43' Alwan; (yellow card) 80' Halman; (yellow card) 90+2' Avif

Jakabaring Stadium, Palembang
Attendance: 162
Referee: Juwira
11 May 2012
19:00 WIB

Persita U-21	2–1	Persib U-21
Permana 26'; Makmun (yellow card) 60'; Tamo (yellow card) 89'	Report	(yellow card) 65' Dinata; 79' Sahal

Jakabaring Stadium, Palembang
Attendance: 25
Referee: Sunardi
13 May 2012
15:30 WIB

Pelita U-21	1–1	Persita U-21
Tawakal (yellow card) 19'; Feriansyah 83' (pen.)	Report	61' Yudiaman; (yellow card) 69' M. Andi

Jakabaring Stadium, Palembang
Attendance: 100
13 May 2012
19:00 WIB

Persib U-21	5–1	Sriwijaya U-21
Sahal 2', 62'; Ramdani 35', 59'; Hidayat 35'; Nur Cahyo (yellow card) 82'; Arianto (yellow card) 84'	Report	14' Ramadhana

Jakabaring Stadium, Palembang
Attendance: 131

=== Group B ===
Team	Pld	W	D	L	GF	GA	GD	Pts
Persela U-21	6	2	3	1	7	3	+4	9
Arema FC U-21	6	2	3	1	8	9	−1	9
Deltras U-21	6	2	2	2	13	10	+3	8
Gresik United U-21	6	0	4	2	6	12	−6	4

4 April 2012
15:30 WIB

Arema U-21	2–1	Persela U-21
Yudo (yellow card) 18'; Ricard (yellow card) 25'; Indra 41'; Iman (yellow card) 44'; Ricard 79' (pen.); Beni (yellow card) 82'; Indra (yellow card) 53' (yellow-red card) 93'	Report	(yellow card) 14' Mario; (yellow card) 22' Febriyanto; 49' Al Itqoni; (yellow card) 90' Al Itqoni

Kanjuruhan Stadium, Malang
Attendance: 152
4 April 2012
19:00 WIB

Deltras U-21	3–3	Gresik U-21
Maidullah (yellow card) 33'; Bahrudin 38', 70'; Mahardhika (yellow card) 49'; Nirwanto 73'; A. Setiawan (yellow card) 84'	Report	9' Haqq; (yellow card) 41' Nurohman; 58' (pen.), 87' (pen.) Hidayat; (yellow card) 80' Risdiyanto

Kanjuruhan Stadium, Malang
Attendance: 130
6 April 2012
15:30 WIB

Persela U-21	3–0	Deltras U-21
Ardiansyah 35'; Badai 39'; Al Itqoni (yellow card) 47'; Setiawan 82'	Report	(yellow card) 1' Muttaqin; (yellow card) 24' A. Setiawan; (yellow card) 63' D. Setiawan; (yellow card) 70' Mahardhika

Kanjuruhan Stadium, Malang
Attendance: 123
6 April 2012
19:00 WIB

Gresik U-21	2–2	Arema U-21
Syahri 12'; Syafa'at (yellow card) 69'; Slamat 73'	Report	16' Abidin; (yellow card) 54' Kuntoro; 60' (pen.) Iman; (yellow card) 72' Muhajir

Kanjuruhan Stadium, Malang
Attendance: 271
8 April 2012
15:30 WIB

Persela U-21	2–0	Gresik U-21
Santoso 17'; Anthawijaya (yellow card) 25'; Sandy 42'	Report	(yellow card) 12' Suhadak; (yellow card) 48' Syafa'at

Kanjuruhan Stadium, Malang
Attendance: 185
8 April 2012
19:00 WIB

Arema U-21	2–1	Deltras U-21
Yudo 36'; Iman 47'; Iman (yellow card) 50'; Swandhiro (yellow card) 59'; Supriyono (yellow card) 90'	Report	31' Bahrudin; (yellow card) 53' Ilyasyah; (yellow card) 61' Mauludin; (yellow card) 65' Anugrah; (yellow card) 90' Solechudin

Kanjuruhan Stadium, Malang
Attendance: 205
Referee: Hamsir
9 May 2012
15:30 WIB

Deltras U-21	4–1	Arema U-21
Muttaqin 5', 36'; Anugrah (yellow card) 29'; Bahrudin 52'; Solechudin 88'	Report	(yellow card) 20' Nugroho; 90+1' Hakim

Gelora Delta Stadium, Sidoarjo
Attendance: 1,052
Referee: Novari Ikhsan
9 May 2012
19:00 WIB

Gresik U-21	0–0	Persela U-21
	Report	(yellow card) 60' Sandy

Gelora Delta Stadium, Sidoarjo
Attendance: 367
Referee: Maulana Nugraha
11 May 2012
15:30 WIB

Deltras U-21	1–1	Persela U-21
Mahardhika (yellow card) 63'; Bahrudin 89'	Report	9' Santoso; (yellow card) 27' Mario; (yellow card) 52' Al Itqoni; (yellow card) 72' Santoso; (yellow card) 17' (yellow-red card) 90+3' Febriyanto

Gelora Delta Stadium, Sidoarjo
Attendance: 838
Referee: Supardi
11 May 2012
19:00 WIB

Arema U-21	1–1	Gresik U-21
Nugroho (yellow card) 30'; Hernandi 75'; Hakim (yellow card) 83'	Report	(yellow card) 41' Rafido; (yellow card) 76' Hervan; 89' Widhistio

Gelora Delta Stadium, Sidoarjo
Attendance: 297
Referee: Fahri Albar
13 May 2012
15:30 WIB

Persela U-21	0–0	Arema U-21
	Report

Gelora Delta Stadium, Sidoarjo
Attendance: 253
13 May 2012
19:00 WIB

Gresik U-21	0–4	Deltras U-21
Risdiyanto (yellow card) 21'; Al-Falah (yellow card) 39'; Susanto (yellow card) 65'; Arizona (yellow card) 67'	Report	1', 81' Bahrudin; 54' Solechudin; 80' Muttaqin

Gelora Delta Stadium, Sidoarjo
Attendance: 869

=== Group C ===
Team	Pld	W	D	L	GF	GA	GD	Pts
Persisam Putra U-21	4	4	0	0	24	1	+23	12
Persiba U-21	4	1	1	2	4	12	−8	4
Mitra Kukar U-21	4	0	1	3	2	17	−15	1

8 April 2012
15:30 WITA

Persiba U-21	1–4	Persisam U-21
Guswandi 9'; Munandar (yellow card) 33'; Isran (yellow card) 81'	Report	22' Sanggiawan; (yellow card) 40' Loudry; 41' Radiansyah; (yellow card) 58' Siswanto; 69' Loudry; (yellow card) 70' Fanani; 87' Ramadhan

Persiba Stadium, Balikpapan
Attendance: 327
10 April 2012
16:00 WITA

Persisam U-21	6–0	Mitra U-21
Pong Baru 7', 52'; Siswanto 11' (pen.); Kristanto 35' (pen.); Radiansyah 60'; Fanani 69'; Radiansyah (yellow card) 90+1'	Report	(yellow card) 33' Genra; (yellow card) 34' (yellow-red card) 39' Lasut; (yellow card) 71' Fidlan Surahman; (yellow card) 83' Arpani; (yellow card) 84' Fandianur; (yellow card) 82' (yellow-red card) 90+1'

Persiba Stadium, Balikpapan
Attendance: 127
Referee: Adi Riyanto
12 April 2012
15:30 WITA

Mitra U-21	0–0	Persiba U-21
Yudhapermana (yellow card) 20'; Fandianur (yellow card) 61'	Report	(yellow card) 34' Isran

Persiba Stadium, Balikpapan
Attendance: 95
Referee: Aeng Suarlan
9 May 2012
15:30 WITA

Mitra U-21	0–8	Persisam U-21
Setiawan (yellow card) 52'	Report	10' Loudry; (yellow card) 20' Loudry; 35' Kristanto; (yellow card) 45' Fedel; 50', 73' Baihaqi; 53' Radiansyah; 58' Sanggiawan; 58' Pong Baru; (yellow card) 70' Sucipto; 71' Sucipto; (yellow card) 90' Kristanto

Segiri Stadium, Samarinda
Attendance: 500
Referee: Suwandi
11 May 2012
15:30 WITA

Persiba U-21	3–2	Mitra U-21
Dio (yellow card) 20'; Turnando 25', 38', 84'; M. Rizal (yellow card) 75'; Turnando (yellow card) 84'	Report	(yellow card) 21' Surahman; 42' (pen.) Purianto; 50' Saputra; (yellow card) 77' Aprilida

Segiri Stadium, Samarinda
Attendance: 400
Referee: Khusnul Yaqin
13 May 2012
16:00 WITA

Persisam U-21	6–0	Persiba U-21
Baihaqi 19'; Pratama (yellow card) 39'; Makatindu 40', 45', 56'; Saputra (yellow card) 65'; Pong Baru 74'; Saputra 89'	Report	(yellow card) 29' Putra; (yellow card) 46' Hermanto; (yellow card) 51' Asriadi

Segiri Stadium, Samarinda
Attendance: 600

=== Group D ===
Team	Pld	W	D	L	GF	GA	GD	Pts
Persija Jakarta U-21	6	5	0	1	10	2	+8	15
PSAP Sigli U-21	6	3	0	3	7	9	−2	9
PSMS Medan U-21	6	2	2	2	5	4	+1	8
PSPS Pekanbaru U-21	6	0	2	4	1	8	−7	2

10 April 2012
15:30 WIB

PSMS U-21	3–0	PSAP U-21
Riki 5'; Irsanda (yellow card) 26'; Sutrisno 46'; Pratama (yellow card) 72'; Priayatna 74'	Report	(yellow card) 28' Martunis; (yellow card) 83' Munandar

Teladan Stadium, Medan
Attendance: 521
Referee: Jerry Elly
10 April 2012
19:00 WIB

Persija U-21	2–0	PSPS U-21
Farid 11'; Farid (yellow card) 58'; Rudi 73'	Report

Teladan Stadium, Medan
Attendance: 253
Referee: Olehadi
12 April 2012
15:30 WIB

PSAP U-21	1–0	Persija U-21
Martunis (yellow card) 12'; Irfandani 56'; Fajar (yellow card) 58'; M. Yanis (yellow card) 73'; Yusrifal (yellow card) 78'; Saifudin (yellow card) 86'	Report	(yellow card) 46' Derifiansyah

Teladan Stadium, Medan
Attendance: 221
Referee: Sudirman
12 April 2012
19:00 WIB

PSPS U-21	0–0	PSMS U-21
Hidayat (yellow card) 20'; Arifin (yellow card) 41'	Report	(yellow card) 26' Syahputra; (yellow card) 87' Khan

Teladan Stadium, Medan
Attendance: 615
Referee: Hariyanto
14 April 2012
15:30 WIB

PSAP U-21	2–0	PSPS U-21
Khairi (yellow card) 48'; Salim 51'; Irfandani 63'	Report	(yellow card) 50' Syawindra

Teladan Stadium, Medan
Attendance: 271
14 April 2012
19:00 WIB

PSMS U-21	0–1	Persija U-21
Priayatna (yellow card) 3'; Irsanda (yellow card) 29'; Sutrisno (yellow card) 80'	Report	(yellow card) 5' Agamal; 8' Ohorella; (yellow card) 13' Ferdianto; (yellow card) 84' Lenzivio; (yellow card) 90+2' Rowi

Teladan Stadium, Medan
Attendance: 577
9 May 2012
15:30 WIB

Persija U-21	2–0	PSMS U-21
Harissandi 14'; Ohorella (yellow card) 60'; Ohorella 78'	Report	(yellow card) 20' Sugiantoro; (yellow card) 57' Mawardi

GOR Ciracas Stadium, Jakarta
Attendance: 1,100
Referee: Toriq M. Alkatiri
9 May 2012
19:00 WIB

PSPS U-21	1–2	PSAP U-21
Safrizal (yellow card) 6'; Syawindra (yellow card) 33'; Syawindra 65'	Report	2' Muhajir; (yellow card) 11' Saifudin; 69' Ardiansyah

GOR Ciracas Stadium, Jakarta
Attendance: 100
Referee: Muhaimin
11 May 2012
15:30 WIB

PSPS U-21	0–2	Persija U-21
Putra (yellow card) 14'	Report	54' Zulfazalani; 69' Harahap; (yellow card) 81' Harissandi

GOR Ciracas Stadium, Jakarta
Attendance: 820
Referee: Moh. Soleh
11 May 2012
19:00 WIB

PSAP U-21	1–2	PSMS U-21
Aziz (yellow card) 40'; Martunis 56'; Martunis (yellow card) 76'; M. Jamil (yellow card) 89'	Report	(yellow card) 3' Priayatna; 43' (pen.) Sugiantoro; (yellow card) 48' Pratama; (yellow card) 55' Irsandi; (yellow card) 65' Sugiantoro; 76' Setiawan

GOR Ciracas Stadium, Jakarta
Attendance: 100
Referee: Thoriq M. Alkatiri
14 May 2012
15:30 WIB

Persija U-21	3–1	PSAP U-21
Ikhwan 4', 55', 73'	Report	(yellow card) 22' Hidayat; (yellow card) 32' Fauzon; (yellow card) 45' Saifudin; 89' Khairi

GOR Ciracas Stadium, Jakarta
Attendance: 1,121
Referee: Muhaimin
14 May 2012
19:00 WIB

PSMS U-21	0–0	PSPS U-21
Setiawan (yellow card) 90+3'	Report	(yellow card) 42' Putra; (yellow card) 54' (yellow-red card) 90' Zurian; (yellow card) 90+2' Patahilah

GOR Ciracas Stadium, Jakarta
Attendance: 200
Referee: Haryanto

=== Group E ===
Team	Pld	W	D	L	GF	GA	GD	Pts
Persipura U-21	6	5	1	0	14	7	+7	16
Persidafon U-21	6	2	2	2	9	5	+4	8
Persiram U-21	6	2	2	2	11	11	0	8
Persiwa U-21	6	0	1	5	1	12	−11	-8

21 April 2012
15:30 WIT

Persiwa U-21	0–0	Persidafon U-21
Ainaga (yellow card) 24'	Report	(yellow card) 30' Soskoy

Mandala Stadium, Jayapura
Attendance: 129
21 April 2012
19:00 WIT

Persipura U-21	4–4	Persiram U-21
da Costa 6'; Antoh 27'; Pattipi 72'; Pattipi (yellow card) 73'; Wenda 77'; Meraudje (yellow card) 85'	Report	35', 46' Sefle; (yellow card) 44' Yadanfle; 48' Bonsapia; 63' Sauyai; (yellow card) 76' Remember

Mandala Stadium, Jayapura
Attendance: 392
23 April 2012
15:30 WIT

Persiram U-21	1–0	Persiwa U-21
Osfaldo 19'	Report	(yellow card) 18' Ainaga

Mandala Stadium, Jayapura
Attendance: 215
Referee: Prasetyo Hadi
23 April 2012
19:00 WIT

Persidafon U-21	1–2	Persipura U-21
Yoku 29'	Report	(yellow card) 44' Wenda; (yellow card) 54' Nasadit; (yellow card) 70' Fardiansyah; 78' Wenda; 90' Kaiwai

Mandala Stadium, Jayapura
Attendance: 325
Referee: Hadi Suroso
25 April 2012
15:30 WIT

Persiram U-21	1–1	Persidafon U-21
Sauyai 14'; Remember (yellow card) 24'; Yadanfle (yellow card) 62' (yellow-red card) 85'	Report	57' Paitonitowolom

Mandala Stadium, Jayapura
Attendance: 255
25 April 2012
19:00 WIT

Persipura U-21	2–1	Persiwa U-21
da Costa 3'; Fonataba (yellow card) 13'; Kaiwai (yellow card) 52'; Antoh (yellow card) 63'; Antoh 82'	Report	(yellow card) 11' Meaga; 25' Hisage; (yellow card) 25' Hisage; (red card) 70' Hisage; (yellow card) 75' Durmaturia; (yellow card) 84' Siregar

Mandala Stadium, Jayapura
Attendance: 279
20 May 2012
15:30 WIT

Persidafon U-21	3 – 0 (w.o.)	Persiwa U-21
	Report

Mandala Stadium, Jayapura
20 May 2012
16:30 WIT

Persiram U-21	1–2	Persipura U-21
Mambraku (yellow card) 48'; Sangaji (yellow card) 51'; Bonsapia 72'	Report	26' Kodey; 34' da Costa

Mandala Stadium, Jayapura
Attendance: 237
22 May 2012
15:30 WIT

Persidafon U-21	4–1	Persiram U-21
Patikuppa 18'; Pahabol 57'; Paitonitowolom 71'; Soskoy (yellow card) 84'; Kambinop 90'	Report	(yellow card) 12' Yadanfle; (yellow card) 84' Bonsapia; (yellow card) 86' Remember; 88' (pen.) Sefle

Mandala Stadium, Jayapura
Attendance: 215
Referee: Kusni
22 May 2012
19:00 WIT

Persiwa U-21	0 – 3 (w.o.)	Persipura U-21
	Report

Mandala Stadium, Jayapura
Attendance: 0
Referee: Joni Parera
24 May 2012
15:30 WIT

Persiwa U-21	0 – 3 (w.o.)	Persiram U-21
	Report

Mandala Stadium, Jayapura
Attendance: 0
Referee: Kusni
24 May 2012
16:30 WIT

Persipura U-21	1–0	Persidafon U-21
Fardiansyah (yellow card) 16' da Costa 75'; Antoh (yellow card) 80'	Report	(yellow card) 59' Patikuppa

Mandala Stadium, Jayapura
Attendance: 455
Referee: Joni Parera
