= 2012 Indonesia Super League U-21 second stage =

The 2012 Indonesia Super League U-21 second stage is contested by a total of 10 teams.

The draw for the group stage was held at the PT. Liga Indonesia house in Jakarta, Indonesia on 8 June 2012. Round I of second stage started 15 June 2012 to ended on 23 June 2012.

In each group, teams play each other home-and-away in a round-robin format, but all the match was held at the same stadium with a home tournament. The winners and runners-up of each group advance to the semifinal.

== Group I ==
All matches were played in Surajaya Stadium, Lamongan.

Team	Pld	W	D	L	GF	GA	GD	Pts
Pelita Jaya U-21	4	2	1	1	8	3	+5	7
Persela U-21	4	2	1	1	6	5	+1	7
Persita U-21	4	2	0	2	8	7	+1	6
Persija U-21	4	2	0	2	5	4	+1	6
PSAP Sigli U-21	4	1	0	3	2	10	-8	3

Friday, 15 June 2012
15:30 WIB

Persela U-21	2 – 0	PSAP U-21
Badai 12'; Placido (yellow card) 58'; Santoso 60'; Sabily (yellow card) 86'	Report	(yellow card) 6' Salim; (yellow card) 53' Martunis; (yellow card) 84' Rahmadana

Surajaya Stadium, Lamongan
Attendance: 200
Referee: Juwari
Friday, 15 June 2012
19:00 WIB

Pelita U-21	1 – 0	Persija U-21
Gumilang 35'; Gumilar (yellow card) 42'; Feriansyah (yellow card) 56' (yellow-red card) 65'	Report	(yellow card) 19' Harahap; (yellow card) 39' Kartadireja; (yellow card) 85' Hasan

Surajaya Stadium, Lamongan
Attendance: 211
Referee: Moh. Sholeh

Sunday, 17 June 2012
15:30 WIB

Persija U-21	3 – 2	Persita U-21
Derifiansyah (yellow card) 41'; Harahap (yellow card) 49'; Agamal 75'; Setiawan 84'; Tommy 88'; Bahri (red card) 90'	Report	7', 69' Arvani; (yellow card) 58' Makmun; (yellow card) 72' Tanjung; (red card) 90' Rahayu

Surajaya Stadium, Lamongan
Attendance: 185
Sunday, 17 June 2012
19:00 WIB

PSAP U-21	0 – 6	Pelita U-21
M. Jamil (yellow card) 70'	Report	5', 14', 73' Gumilang; 12', 59' Maulana; 69' Sutanto; (yellow card) 85' Sutanto

Surajaya Stadium, Lamongan
Attendance: 150

Tuesday, 19 June 2012
15:30 WIB

Pelita U-21	1 – 1	Persela U-21
Mas'ud (yellow card) 20'; Gumilang 64'; Tuasykal (yellow card) 22' (yellow-red card) 71'	Report	(yellow card) 19' Febriyanto; 87' Badai

Surajaya Stadium, Lamongan
Attendance: 311
Referee: Kusni
Tuesday, 19 June 2012
19:00 WIB

Persita U-21	2 – 1	PSAP U-21
Al Achya (yellow card) 72'; Al Achya 73', 78'	Report	33' Irfandi; (yellow card) 65' Saputra

Surajaya Stadium, Lamongan
Attendance: 311
Referee: Maulana Nugraha

Thursday, 21 June 2012
15:30 WIB

PSAP U-21	1 – 0	Persija U-21
Saputra (yellow card) 29'; Ramadan (yellow card) 56'; Khairi 66'; Munandar (yellow card) 69'	Report	(yellow card) 72' Setiawan

Surajaya Stadium, Lamongan
Attendance: 121
Referee: Juwari
Thursday, 21 June 2012
19:00 WIB

Persela U-21	3 – 2	Persita U-21
Santoso 15', 31'; Badai 69'; Setiawan (yellow card) 88'	Report	44', 90' Arvani; (yellow card) 65' Al Achya; (yellow card) 71' Yudiaman

Surajaya Stadium, Lamongan
Attendance: 513
Referee: Moh. Sholeh

Saturday, 23 June 2012
15:30 WIB

Persija U-21	2 – 0	Persela U-21
Ikhwan 31' (72)	Report	(yellow card) 13' Devayana; (yellow card) 75' Ichsan

Surajaya Stadium, Lamongan
Attendance: 426
Referee: Najamuddin Aspiran
Saturday, 23 June 2012
19:00 WIB

Persita U-21	2 – 0	Pelita U-21
Jauhari 5'; Mardian 23'; Sofyan (yellow card) 43'; Hidayatullah (yellow card) 61'; Permana (yellow card) 64'	Report

Surajaya Stadium, Lamongan
Attendance: 76
Referee: Moh. Sholeh

== Group II ==
All matches were played in Mandala Stadium, Jayapura.

Team	Pld	W	D	L	GF	GA	GD	Pts
Persipura U-21	3	2	1	0	13	5	+8	7
Persisam Putra U-21	3	2	1	0	9	5	+4	7
Persidafon U-21	3	1	0	2	5	12	-7	3
Persiba U-21	3	0	0	3	3	8	-5	0
Arema FC U-21(DQ)	0	0	0	0	0	0	0	0

Saturday, 16 June 2012
15:00 WIT

Persipura U-21	7 – 1	Persidafon U-21
Rumsarwir 5', 32'; Fonataba 24' da Costa 61'; Pattipi 64'; Pattipi (yellow card) 64'; Buiney 76'; Meraudje 89'	Report	(yellow card) 36' Paitonitowolom; (yellow card) 41' Syauta; (yellow card) 60' Yoku; (yellow card) 74' R. Titaley; 86' Patikuppa

Mandala Stadium, Jayapura
Attendance: 0
Saturday, 16 June 2012
19:00 WIT

Persiba U-21	1 – 2	Persisam U-21
Kurniawan (yellow card) 42'; Guswandi 64'	Report	13', 30' Makatindu; (yellow card) 41' (yellow-red card) 64' Kristanto; (yellow card) 75' Sandi

Mandala Stadium, Jayapura
Attendance: 0

Monday, 18 June 2012
15:30 WIT

Persisam U-21	2 – 2	Persipura U-21
Makatindu 25'; Zainudin 67'	Report	60', 73' Antoh; (yellow card) 75' Fonataba; (yellow card) 81' Fardiansyah; (yellow card) 82' Meraudje

Mandala Stadium, Jayapura
Attendance: 0
Monday, 18 June 2012
18:00 WIT

Persidafon U-21	2 – 0	Persiba U-21
Yoku (yellow card) 30'; Soskoy 38'; Syauta (yellow card) 64'; Kallem (yellow card) 66'; Kallem 68'	Report	(yellow card) 56' Putra

Mandala Stadium, Jayapura
Attendance: 0

Thursday, 21 June 2012
15:30 WIT

Persidafon U-21	2 – 5	Persisam U-21
E. Titaley 17'; Kambinop 21'; Felle (yellow card) 33'; Kasse (yellow card) 80'	Report	10', 65' Aldeir Makatindu; 59' Sanggiawan; 74' Radiansyah; 85' Pong Baru

Mandala Stadium, Jayapura
Attendance: 0
Referee: Abdul Kadir
Thursday, 21 June 2012
19:00 WIT

Persipura U-21	4 – 2	Persiba U-21
Pattipi 36'; Antoh 44' da Costa 48', 49'	Report	32', 76' Turnando; (yellow card) 55' Mahmud; (yellow card) 77' Pratama

Mandala Stadium, Jayapura
Attendance: 0
Referee: Ahmad Tuharea
