= 2012 Indonesia Super League U-21 =

Indonesian Super League U-21
- Season: 2012
- Champions: Persela U-21 (2nd title)
- Matches: 74
- Goals: 237 (3.2 per match)
- Top goalscorer: Aldaier Makatindu (9 goals)
- Biggest home win: Persisam 6–0 Mitra Kukar (10 April 2012); Persisam 6–0 Persiba (13 May 2012); Persipura 7–1 Persidafon (16 June 2012); PSAP 0–6 Pelita (17 June 2012)
- Biggest away win: Mitra Kukar 0–8 Persisam (9 May 2012)
- Highest scoring: Persipura 4–4 Persiram (21 April 2012); Mitra Kukar 0–8 Persisam (9 May 2012); Persipura 7–1 Persidafon (16 June 2012); Pelita 7–1 Persipura (1 July 2012)
- Longest winning run: Persipura (6 matches)
- Longest unbeaten run: Persipura (9 matches)
- Longest winless run: Gresik United; Persiwa; PSPS (6 matches)
- Longest losing run: Persiwa (5 matches)

The 2012 Indonesia Super League U-21 season was the fourth edition of Indonesia Super League U-21 (ISL U-21), a companion competition Indonesian super league that are intended for footballers under the age of twenty-one years.

Persela U-21 is the defending champion in this season.

== Format ==
The competition is divided into three acts consist of two round the group and knockout round. The first round is divided into five groups each containing four and three clubs, two top teams of each group advanced to the second round. The second half consisted of two groups containing five teams in each group intended, the two best teams from each group advanced to the semifinals. The winner advanced to the final, while two teams who defeated third-ranked fight. Final winner becomes the champion.

== Teams ==
=== Promotion and relegation ===
Teams promoted to ISL U-21

- Gresik United U-21
- Mitra Kukar FC U-21
- Persiba Bantul U-21
- Persidafon U-21
- Persiraja U-21
- Persita U-21
- PSAP Sigli U-21
- PSMS Medan U-21

Teams relegated

- Bontang FC U-21
- PSM Makassar U-21
- Persema U-21
- Persibo U-21

=== Personnel and kits ===
Note: Flags indicate national team as has been defined under FIFA eligibility rules. Players and Managers may hold more than one non-FIFA nationality.

Team	Coach	Captain	Kit manufacturer	Shirt sponsor
Arema FC U-21			Ultras	
Deltras U-21	(Indonesia) Hariadi Triarso		adidas	
Gresik United U-21				
Mitra Kukar FC U-21				
Pelita Jaya U-21	(Indonesia) Ronny Remon		Umbro	
Persela U-21	(Indonesia) Didik Ludianto	(Indonesia) Eky Taufik Febriyanto	Reebok	So Nice
Persib Bandung U-21	(Indonesia) Mustika Hadi		Vilour	Amidis
Persiba U-21	(Indonesia) Sukliwon Irianto		SPECS	
Persidafon U-21				
Persija Jakarta U-21	(Indonesia) Francis Wewengkang	(Indonesia) Astino Derifiansyah	League	
Persipura U-21	(Indonesia) Max Olua		SPECS	Bank Papua
Persiram U-21				Fourking Mandiri
Persisam Putra U-21	(Indonesia) Rudy Keltjes		Lotto	Elty
Persita U-21	(Indonesia) Wiganda Saputra	(Indonesia) Saiful Hidayatullah	mitre	
Persiwa U-21	(Indonesia) Choirul Huda		Umbro	
PSAP Sigli U-21	(Indonesia) Anwar Kene			
PSMS Medan U-21	(Indonesia) Jefrizal	(Indonesia) Wiganda Pradika	Eutag	
PSPS Pekanbaru U-21	(Indonesia) Agus Rianto			
Sriwijaya FC U-21	(Indonesia) Sunardi	(Indonesia) Rifki Dwi Hermawan	SPECS	

== Group stage ==
Round I of group stage started 2 April 2012 to ended on 25 April 2012 and round II started 9 May 2012 to ended on 24 May 2012.

Persijap Jepara U-21, Semen Padang U-21 (Previous Runner-up), Persiba Bantul U-21 and Persiraja U-21 withdrawn after the main team of the four U-21 team was withdrawn from Indonesia Super League and played in Indonesia Premier League.

Key to colours in group tables
Group winners and runners-up advanced to the second group stage

=== Group A ===
All matches were played in Krakatau Steel Stadium, Cilegon (round I) and in Jakabaring Stadium, Palembang (round II).

Team	Pld	W	D	L	GF	GA	GD	Pts
Persita U-21	6	5	1	0	13	5	+8	16
Pelita Jaya U-21	6	2	2	2	10	8	+2	8
Persib U-21	6	2	1	3	8	8	0	7
Sriwijaya FC U-21	6	1	0	5	6	16	−10	3

	PEL	PSIB	PSTA	SRI
Pelita U-21		0–1	1–1	3–0
Persib U-21	1–1		0–2	5–1
Persita U-21	3–2	2–1		3–0
Sriwijaya U-21	2–3	2–0	1–2	

=== Group B ===
All matches were played in Kanjuruhan Stadium, Malang Regency (round I) and in Gelora Delta Stadium, Sidoarjo (round II).

Team	Pld	W	D	L	GF	GA	GD	Pts
Persela U-21	6	2	3	1	7	3	+4	9
Arema FC U-21	6	2	3	1	8	9	−1	9
Deltras U-21	6	2	2	2	13	10	+3	8
Gresik United U-21	6	0	4	2	6	12	−6	4

	ARE	DEL	GRES	PSLA
Arema U-21		2–1	1–1	2–1
Deltras U-21	4–1		3–3	1–1
Gresik United U-21	2–2	0–4		0–0
Persela U-21	0–0	3–0	2–0	

=== Group C ===
All matches were played in Persiba Stadium, Balikpapan (round I) and in Segiri Stadium, Samarinda (round II).

Team	Pld	W	D	L	GF	GA	GD	Pts
Persisam Putra U-21	4	4	0	0	24	1	+23	12
Persiba U-21	4	1	1	2	4	12	−8	4
Mitra Kukar FC U-21	4	0	1	3	2	17	−15	1

	KUK	PSBA	PPSA
Mitra Kukar FC U-21		0–0	0–8
Persiba U-21	3–2		1–4
Persisam U-21	6–0	6–0	

=== Group D ===
All matches were played in Teladan Stadium, Medan (round I) and in GOR Ciracas Stadium, Jakarta (round II).

Team	Pld	W	D	L	GF	GA	GD	Pts
Persija Jakarta U-21	6	5	0	1	10	2	+8	15
PSAP Sigli U-21	6	3	0	3	7	9	−2	9
PSMS Medan U-21	6	2	2	2	5	4	+1	8
PSPS Pekanbaru U-21	6	0	2	4	1	8	−7	2

	PSJA	PSAP	PSMS	PSPS
Persija U-21		3–1	2–0	2–0
PSAP U-21	1–0		1–2	2–0
PSMS U-21	0–1	3–0		0–0
PSPS U-21	0–2	1–2	0–0	

=== Group E ===
All matches were played in Mandala Stadium, Jayapura

Team	Pld	W	D	L	GF	GA	GD	Pts
Persipura U-21	6	5	1	0	14	7	+7	16
Persidafon U-21	6	2	2	2	9	5	+4	8
Persiram U-21	6	2	2	2	11	11	0	8
Persiwa U-21	6	0	1	5	1	12	−11	-8^{4}

	PSDF	PSPR	PSRM	PSWA
Persidafon U-21		1–2	4–1	3–0^{1}
Persipura U-21	1–0		4–4	2–1
Persiram U-21	1–1	1–2		1–0
Persiwa U-21	0–0	0–3^{2}	0–3^{3}	

Updated to games played on 24 May 2012.
Source: ISL U-21 Review · ISL U-21 Table
^{1} = Persidafon U-21 walkover win over Persiwa U-21
^{2} = Persipura U-21 walkover win over Persiwa U-21
^{3} = Persiram U-21 walkover win over Persiwa U-21
^{4} = Persiwa U-21 were deducted 9 points due to three times was not present at the stadium in the face of Persidafon U-21, Persipura U-21 and Persiram U-21
Rules for classification: 1st points; 2nd goal difference; 3rd number of goals scored.
(C) = Champion; (R) = Relegated; (P) = Promoted; (O) = Play-off winner; (A) = Advances to a further round.
Only applicable when the season is not finished:
(Q) = Qualified to the phase of tournament indicated; (TQ) = Qualified to tournament, but not yet to the particular phase indicated; (DQ) = Disqualified from tournament.

== Second stage ==
This stage started after drawing in opening June 2012. Start on 16 June to end on 23 June 2012.

Key to colours in group tables
Group winners and runners-up advanced to the semifinal

=== Group I ===
All matches were played in Surajaya Stadium, Lamongan.

Team	Pld	W	D	L	GF	GA	GD	Pts
Pelita Jaya U-21	4	2	1	1	8	3	+4	7
Persela U-21	4	2	1	1	6	5	+1	7
Persita U-21	4	2	0	3	8	7	+1	6
Persija U-21	4	2	0	3	5	4	+1	6
PSAP Sigli U-21	4	1	0	3	2	10	−8	3

	PEL	PSLA	PSJA	PSTA	PSAP
Pelita U-21		1–1	1–0	-	-
Persela U-21	-		-	3–2	2–0
Persija U-21	-	2–0		3–2	-
Persita U-21	2–0	-	-		2–1
PSAP U-21	0–6	-	1–0	-	

=== Group II ===
All matches were played in Mandala Stadium, Jayapura.

Team	Pld	W	D	L	GF	GA	GD	Pts
Persipura U-21	3	2	1	0	13	5	+8	7
Persisam Putra U-21	3	2	1	0	9	5	+4	7
Persidafon U-21	3	1	0	2	5	12	−7	3
Persiba U-21	3	0	0	3	3	8	−5	0
Arema FC U-21(DQ)	0	0	0	0	0	0	0	0

	PSBA	PSDF	PSPR	PPSA
Persiba U-21		-	-	1–2
Persidafon U-21	2–0		-	2–5
Persipura U-21	4–2	7–1		-
Persisam U-21	-	-	2–2	

Updated to games played on 23 June 2012.
Source: ISL U-21 Review · ISL U-21 Table
Rules for classification: 1st points; 2nd goal difference; 3rd number of goals scored.
(C) = Champion; (R) = Relegated; (P) = Promoted; (O) = Play-off winner; (A) = Advances to a further round.
Only applicable when the season is not finished:
(Q) = Qualified to the phase of tournament indicated; (TQ) = Qualified to tournament, but not yet to the particular phase indicated; (DQ) = Disqualified from tournament.

== Knockout stage ==
Semi-finals
28 June – Malang Regency
Pelita U-21	1
Persisam U-21	4
28 June – Malang Regency
Persipura U-21	0
Persela U-21	2

Final
1 July – Malang Regency
Persisam U-21	2 (4)
Persela U-21 (p)	2 (5)
Third place
1 July - Malang Regency
Pelita U-21	7
Persipura U-21	1

=== Semi-finals ===
28 June 2012
15:30 WIB

Pelita U-21	1–4	Persisam U-21
Feriansyah 77'	Report	Pong Baru 29'; Makatindu 36'; Tausykal 72' (o.g.); Sanggiawan 73'

Kanjuruhan Stadium, Malang Regency
Attendance: 367
Referee: Djumadi Effendi
28 June 2012
19:00 WIB

Persipura U-21	0–2	Persela U-21
	Report	Santoso 6', 68'

Kanjuruhan Stadium, Malang Regency
Attendance: 367
Referee: Aeng Suarlan

=== Third-placed ===
1 July 2012
15:15 WIB

Pelita U-21	7–1	Persipura U-21
Feriansyah 3' (pen.), 17', 87'; Gumilang 22' (pen.), 28', 84'; Afriansyah 89'	Report	72' Rumsarwir

Kanjuruhan Stadium, Malang Regency
Attendance: 300
Referee: Djumadi Effendi

=== Final ===
1 July 2012
19:00 WIB

Persisam U-21	2–2 (a.e.t.)	Persela U-21
Pong Baru 45', 65'	Report	19' Badai; 72' Sandy
Penalties
Pong Baru (penalty scored); Pratama (penalty scored); Siswanto (penalty scored); Radiansyah (penalty scored); Kristanto (penalty missed)	4–5	(penalty scored) Badai; (penalty scored) Anthawijaya; (penalty scored) Santoso; (penalty scored) Sandy; (penalty scored) Febriyanto

Kanjuruhan Stadium, Malang Regency
Attendance: 495
Referee: Aeng Suarlan

== Season statistics ==
=== Top goalscorers ===
Including matches played on 1 July 2012

Rank	Player	Club	Goals
1	(Indonesia) Aldeir Makatindu	Persisam U-21	9
1	(Indonesia) Dimas Galih Gumilang	Pelita Jaya U-21	9
3	(Indonesia) Feriansyah Mas'ud	Pelita Jaya U-21	8
3	(Indonesia) Lerby Eliandry	Persisam U-21	8
3	(Indonesia) Sirvi Arvani	Persita U-21	8
6	(Indonesia) Moch. Bahrudin	Deltras U-21	7
6	(Indonesia) Rudy Santoso	Persela U-21	7
6	(Indonesia) Benny Alexander da Costa	Persipura U-21	7
9	(Indonesia) Irsyad Maulana	Pelita Jaya U-21	5
9	(Indonesia) Fengky Turnando	Persiba U-21	5
9	(Indonesia) Ahmad Ihwan	Persija U-21	5
9	(Indonesia) Theopilus Wion Antoh	Persipura U-21	5
9	(Indonesia) Aldi Al Achya	Persita U-21	5
14	(Indonesia) Ragil Muhammad Badai	Persela U-21	4
14	(Indonesia) Radiansyah	Persisam U-21	4
16	(Indonesia) Iman Budi Hernandi	Arema U-21	3
16	(Indonesia) Faisal Muttaqin	Deltras U-21	3
16	(Indonesia) Ahmad Sahal	Persib U-21	3
16	(Indonesia) Marshell Imanuel Pattipi	Persipura U-21	3
16	(Indonesia) Victorius Rumsarwir	Persipura U-21	3
16	(Indonesia) Samuel Sefle	Persiram U-21	3
16	(Indonesia) Bayu Gatra Sanggiawan	Persisam U-21	3
16	(Indonesia) Irfandani	PSAP U-21	3
24	(Indonesia) Mochammad Solechudin	Deltras U-21	2
24	(Indonesia) M. Rahmat Hidayat	Gresik United U-21	2
24	(Indonesia) Qoiron Sandy	Persela U-21	2
24	(Indonesia) Erwin Ramdani	Persib U-21	2
24	(Indonesia) Ade Guswandi	Persiba U-21	2
24	(Indonesia) Ahmad Indra Patikupa	Persidafon U-21	2
24	(Indonesia) Idelfonsius Kambinop	Persidafon U-21	2
24	(Indonesia) Petrus Paitonitowolom	Persidafon U-21	2
24	(Indonesia) Rudi Setiawan	Persija U-21	2
24	(Indonesia) Zulfikar Ali Mustaqim Ohorella	Persija U-21	2
24	(Indonesia) Yance Wenda	Persipura U-21	2
24	(Indonesia) Roberto Elfrado Sauyai	Persiram U-21	2
24	(Indonesia) Yulius Deki Bonsapia	Persiram U-21	2
24	(Indonesia) Imam Bayhaqi	Persisam U-21	2
24	(Indonesia) Loudry Meilana Setiawan	Persisam U-21	2
24	(Indonesia) Wahyu Kristanto	Persisam U-21	2
24	(Indonesia) Sukron Makmun	Persita U-21	2
24	(Indonesia) M. Jamil Khairi	PSAP U-21	2
24	(Indonesia) Ahmad Romadhon Putra	Sriwijaya U-21	2
24	(Indonesia) Rifki Dwi Hermawan	Sriwijaya U-21	2
44	(Indonesia) Fikri Fahmi Hakim	Arema U-21	1
44	(Indonesia) Indra Ari Cahyono	Arema U-21	1
44	(Indonesia) Kushedya Hari Yudo	Arema U-21	1
44	(Indonesia) Ricard Abimanyu	Arema U-21	1
44	(Indonesia) Zaenal Abidin	Arema U-21	1
44	(Indonesia) Bagus Nirwanto	Deltras U-21	1
44	(Indonesia) M. Ilham Arfil Haqq	Gresik United U-21	1
44	(Indonesia) Moh. Syahri	Gresik United U-21	1
44	(Indonesia) Muhamat Slamat	Gresik United U-21	1
44	(Indonesia) Wismoyo Widhistio	Gresik United U-21	1
44	(Indonesia) Galih Joko Saputra	Mitra Kukar FC U-21	1

Rank	Player	Club	Goals
44	(Indonesia) Indra Purianto	Mitra Kukar FC U-21	1
44	(Indonesia) Afriansyah	Pelita Jaya U-21	1
44	(Indonesia) M. Gugum Gumilar	Pelita Jaya U-21	1
44	(Indonesia) Rafid Lestaluhu	Pelita Jaya U-21	1
44	(Indonesia) Sutanto	Pelita Jaya U-21	1
44	(Indonesia) Beni Agung Setiawan	Persela U-21	1
44	(Indonesia) Fuzi Sait Al Itqoni	Persela U-21	1
44	(Indonesia) Rendy Ardiansyah	Persela U-21	1
44	(Indonesia) Dippi Yogaswara	Persib U-21	1
44	(Indonesia) Maulana Siswanto	Persib U-21	1
44	(Indonesia) Taufik Hidayat	Persib U-21	1
44	(Indonesia) Alan Jekson Kallem	Persidafon U-21	1
44	(Indonesia) Erryandi Titaley	Persidafon U-21	1
44	(Indonesia) Irfin Juan Soskoy	Persidafon U-21	1
44	(Indonesia) Jems Yoku	Persidafon U-21	1
44	(Indonesia) Yohanes Ferinando Pahabol	Persidafon U-21	1
44	(Indonesia) Abdul Tommy	Persija U-21	1
44	(Indonesia) Fahreza Agamal	Persija U-21	1
44	(Indonesia) Farid Ridwan	Persija U-21	1
44	(Indonesia) Gilang Mahesa Harahap	Persija U-21	1
44	(Indonesia) Kiki Harisandi	Persija U-21	1
44	(Indonesia) Zulfazalani	Persija U-21	1
44	(Indonesia) Dennis Buiney	Persipura U-21	1
44	(Indonesia) Felix Meraudje	Persipura U-21	1
44	(Indonesia) Maikel Kodey	Persipura U-21	1
44	(Indonesia) Sefnat Fonataba	Persipura U-21	1
44	(Indonesia) Yefferson M. Kaiwai	Persipura U-21	1
44	(Indonesia) Romario Osfaldo Samagita	Persiram U-21	1
44	(Indonesia) Adi Sucipto	Persisam U-21	1
44	(Indonesia) Awal Ramadhan	Persisam U-21	1
44	(Indonesia) Mochamad Mari Siswanto	Persisam U-21	1
44	(Indonesia) Muhammad Zainal Fanani	Persisam U-21	1
44	(Indonesia) Yisep Saputra	Persisam U-21	1
44	(Indonesia) Zainudin	Persisam U-21	1
44	(Indonesia) Alfian Yudiaman	Persita U-21	1
44	(Indonesia) Dika Denhas Jauhari	Persita U-21	1
44	(Indonesia) Ferdiansyah	Persita U-21	1
44	(Indonesia) Mardian	Persita U-21	1
44	(Indonesia) Nana Permana	Persita U-21	1
44	(Indonesia) Tamo	Persita U-21	1
44	(Indonesia) Paulus Hisage	Persiwa U-21	1
44	(Indonesia) Agus Salim	PSAP U-21	1
44	(Indonesia) Dian Ardiansyah	PSAP U-21	1
44	(Indonesia) Martunis	PSAP U-21	1
44	(Indonesia) Muhajir	PSAP U-21	1
44	(Indonesia) Juanda Priayatna	PSMS U-21	1
44	(Indonesia) Riki Ardiansyah	PSMS U-21	1
44	(Indonesia) Sugiantoro	PSMS U-21	1
44	(Indonesia) Sutrisno	PSMS U-21	1
44	(Indonesia) Wawan Setiawan	PSMS U-21	1
44	(Indonesia) Belly Syawindra	PSPS U-21	1
44	(Indonesia) Ichsan Kurniawan	Sriwijaya U-21	1
44	(Indonesia) Rizky Ramadhana	Sriwijaya U-21	1

=== Own goals ===
Player	Club	For
(Indonesia) Mausan Mustary Tausykal	Pelita Jaya U-21	Persisam Putra U-21

=== Hat-tricks ===
Player	For	Against	Result	Date
(Indonesia) Fengky Turnando	Persiba U-21	Mitra Kukar U-21	3–2	11 May 2012
(Indonesia) Aldeir Makatindu	Persisam Putra U-21	Persiba U-21	6–0	13 May 2012
(Indonesia) Ahmad Ikhwan	Persija Jakarta U-21	PSAP Sigli U-21	3–1	14 May 2012
(Indonesia) Dimas Galih Gumilang	Pelita Jaya U-21	PSAP Sigli U-21	6–0	17 June 2012
(Indonesia) Feriansyah Mas'ud	Pelita Jaya U-21	Persipura U-21	7–1	1 July 2012
(Indonesia) Dimas Galih Gumilang	Pelita Jaya U-21	Persipura U-21	7–1	1 July 2012

=== Scoring ===
- First goal of the season: Sukron Makmun for Persita U-21 against Sriwijaya U-21 (2 April 2012)
- Fastest goal of the season: 55 second – Moch. Bahrudin for Deltras U-21 against Gresik United U-21 (13 May 2012)
- Widest winning margin: 8 goals
  - Mitra Kukar U-21 0–8 Persisam Putra U-21 (9 May 2012)
- Highest scoring game: 8 goals
  - Persipura U-21 4–4 Persiram U-21 (21 April 2012)
  - Mitra Kukar U-21 0–8 Persisam Putra U-21 (9 May 2012)
  - Persipura U-21 7–1 Persidafon U-21 (16 June 2012)
  - Pelita Jaya U-21 7–1 Persipura U-21 (1 July 2012)
- Most goals scored in a match by a single team: 8 goals
  - Mitra Kukar U-21 0–8 Persisam Putra U-21 (9 May 2012)
- Most goals scored in a match by a losing team: 2 goals
  - Persita U-21 3–2 Pelita Jaya U-21 (9 April 2012)
  - Persiba U-21 3–2 Mitra Kukar U-21 (11 May 2012)
  - Persija Jakarta U-21 3–2 Persita U-21 (17 June 2012)
  - Persela U-21 3–2 Persita U-21 (21 June 2012)
  - Persidafon U-21 2–5 Persisam Putra U-21 (21 June 2012)
  - Persipura U-21 4–2 Persiba U-21 (21 June 2012)
- Widest away winning margin: 8 goals
  - Mitra Kukar U-21 0–8 Persisam Putra U-21 (9 May 2012)
- Most goals scored by an away team: 8 goals
  - Mitra Kukar U-21 0–8 Persisam Putra U-21 (9 May 2012)

=== Clean sheets ===
- Most Clean Sheets: 6
  - Persela U-21
- Fewest clean sheets: 1
  - Arema U-21
  - Deltras U-21
  - Gresik United U-21
  - Mitra Kukar U-21
  - Persib U-21
  - Persiba U-21
  - Persiwa U-21
  - Sriwijaya U-21

== See also ==
- 2011-12 Indonesia Super League
- 2011-12 Liga Indonesia Premier Division (LI)
