= 2012 Indonesia Super League U-21 knockout stage =

The knockout stage of 2012 Indonesia Super League U-21 is scheduled to begin on 28 June 2012 and to be completed on 1 July 2012 with the final at the Kanjuruhan Stadium in Malang Regency. After the completion of the group stage on 23 June 2012, four teams qualified for the semi-finals (two from each group), which are to be played from 28 June 2012. Host clubs Arema FC U-21 failed to qualify for the semi-finals.

== Qualified teams ==
Group	Winners	Runners-up
I	Pelita Jaya U-21	Persela U-21
II	Persipura U-21	Persisam Putra U-21

== Bracket ==
Semi-finals
28 June – Malang Regency
Pelita U-21	1
Persisam U-21	4
28 June – Malang Regency
Persipura U-21	0
Persela U-21	2

Final
1 July – Malang Regency
Persisam U-21	2 (4)
Persela U-21 (p)	2 (5)
Third place
1 July - Malang Regency
Pelita U-21	7
Persipura U-21	1

== Semi-finals ==
=== Pelita U-21 vs Persisam U-21 ===
28 June 2012
15:30 WIB

Pelita U-21	1-4	Persisam U-21
Feriansyah 77'	Report	Pong Baru 29'; Makatindu 36'; Tausykal 72' (o.g.); Sanggiawan 73'

Kanjuruhan Stadium, Malang Regency
Attendance: 367
Referee: Djumadi Effendi

Pelita U-21	Persisam U-21

PELITA U-21:
GK	69	Natshir Mahbuby
RB	34	Rafsanzani Ibrahim Serang
CB	67	Syahfizra Dwi Oktavian	(yellow card) 11'
CB	90	Ferry Fananda		(substituted off) 75'
LB	55	Mausan Mustary Tausykal
RM	46	Jhoni Arif Purwanto		(substituted off) 38'
CM	88	Irsyad Maulana
CM	91	M. Gugum Gumilar		(substituted off) 57'
LM	68	Dafiv Armando Laksono
ST	20	Feriansyah Mas'ud (c)
ST	51	Dimas Galih Gumilang
Substitutions:
FW	95	Afriansyah		(substituted in) 38'
MF	71	Akbar Riansyah		(substituted in) 57'
DF	51	Ahmad Taufik		(substituted in) 75'
Coach:
Ronny Remon

PERSISAM U-21:
GK	30	Muhammad Ramdani
RB	3	Muhammad Mari Siswanto
CB	2	Wahyu Kristanto
CB	16	Muhammad Zainal Fanani
LB	23	Imam Baihaqi
RM	7	Radiansyah
CM	4	Sevan Lingga Pratama
CM	18	Bayu Gatra Sanggiawan
LM	22	Sandi	(substituted off) 87'
ST	12	Lerby Eliandry Pong Baru	(substituted off) 80'
ST	25	Aldeir Makatindu (c)	(substituted off) 74'
Substitutions:
MF	77	Loudry Meilana Setiawan	(substituted in) 74'
FW	10	Imam Bayhaqi	(substituted in) 80'
MF	17	Awal Ramadhan	(substituted in) 87'
Coach:
Rudy Keltjes

Man of the Match:

Assistant referees:
Jhonie
Mudjianto
Fourth official:
Iwan Sukoco

=== Persipura U-21 vs Persela U-21 ===
28 June 2012
19:00 WIB

Persipura U-21	0-2	Persela U-21
	Report	Santoso 6', 68'

Kanjuruhan Stadium, Malang Regency
Attendance: 367
Referee: Aeng Suarlan

Persipura U-21	Persela U-21

PERSIPURA U-21:
GK	20	Klemens H. Modouw	(yellow card) 86'
RB	32	Muhammad Tahir
CB	2	Yefferson M. Kaiwai (c)	(yellow card) 33'
CB	3	Maikel Kodey
LB	4	Fardiansyah
CM	10	Dennis Buiney
CM	15	Felix Meraudje		(substituted off) 24'
CM	30	Serteis O. Waimbo
RF	23	Benny Alexander da Costa
CF	99	Marshell Imanuel Pattipi
LF	11	Theopilus Wion Antoh	(yellow card) 66'	(substituted off) 69'
Substitutions:
MF	71	Victorius Rumsarwir		(substituted in) 24'
MF	9	Legy Tawi Karoba		(substituted in) 69'
Coach:
Max Olua

PERSELA U-21:
GK	89	Bimantara Yudha Perwira
RB	30	Eky Taufik Febriyanto
CB	74	Balada Mahardika Placido
CB	77	Qoiron Sandy (c)
LB	26	I Made Anthawijaya
RM	70	Mario Rokhmanto	(substituted off) 65'
CM	79	Ragil Muhammad Badai
CM	85	Muhammad Bangkit Sabily
LM	29	Fahrizal Amiruddin
ST	71	Rendy Ardiansyah	(substituted off) 84'
ST	99	Rudy Santoso
Substitutions:
MF	28	I Kadek Devayana	(substituted in) 65'
FW	66	Beni Agung Setiawan	(substituted in) 84'
Coach:
Didik Ludianto

Man of the Match:

Assistant referees:
M. Yamin Saputra, Mpd.
Ficky Pangerapan
Fourth official:
Maulana Nugraha

== Third-placed ==
Sunday, 1 July 2012
15:15 WIB

Pelita U-21	7-1	Persipura U-21
Feriansyah 3' (pen.), 17', 87'; Gumilang 22' (pen.), 28', 84'; Afriansyah 89'	Report	72' Rumsarwir

Kanjuruhan Stadium, Malang Regency
Attendance: 300
Referee: Djumadi Effendi

Pelita U-21	Persipura U-21

Man of the Match:

Assistant referees:
Mudjianto
Jhonie
Fourth official:
Iwan Sukoco

== Final ==
Sunday, 1 July 2012
19:00 WIB

Persisam U-21	2-2 (a.e.t.)	Persela U-21
Pong Baru 45', 65'	Report	19' Badai; 72' Sandy
Penalties
Pong Baru (penalty scored); Pratama (penalty scored); Siswanto (penalty scored); Radiansyah (penalty scored); Kristanto (penalty missed)	4-5	(penalty scored) Badai; (penalty scored) Anthawijaya; (penalty scored) Santoso; (penalty scored) Sandy; (penalty scored) Febriyanto

Kanjuruhan Stadium, Malang Regency
Attendance: 495
Referee: Aeng Suarlan

Persisam U-21	Persela U-21

Man of the Match:
Lerby Eliandry Pong Baru

Assistant referees:
M. Yamin Saputra, Mpd.
Ficky Pangerapan
Fourth official:
Maulana Nugraha
