= 2009 Indonesia Super League U-21 Final =

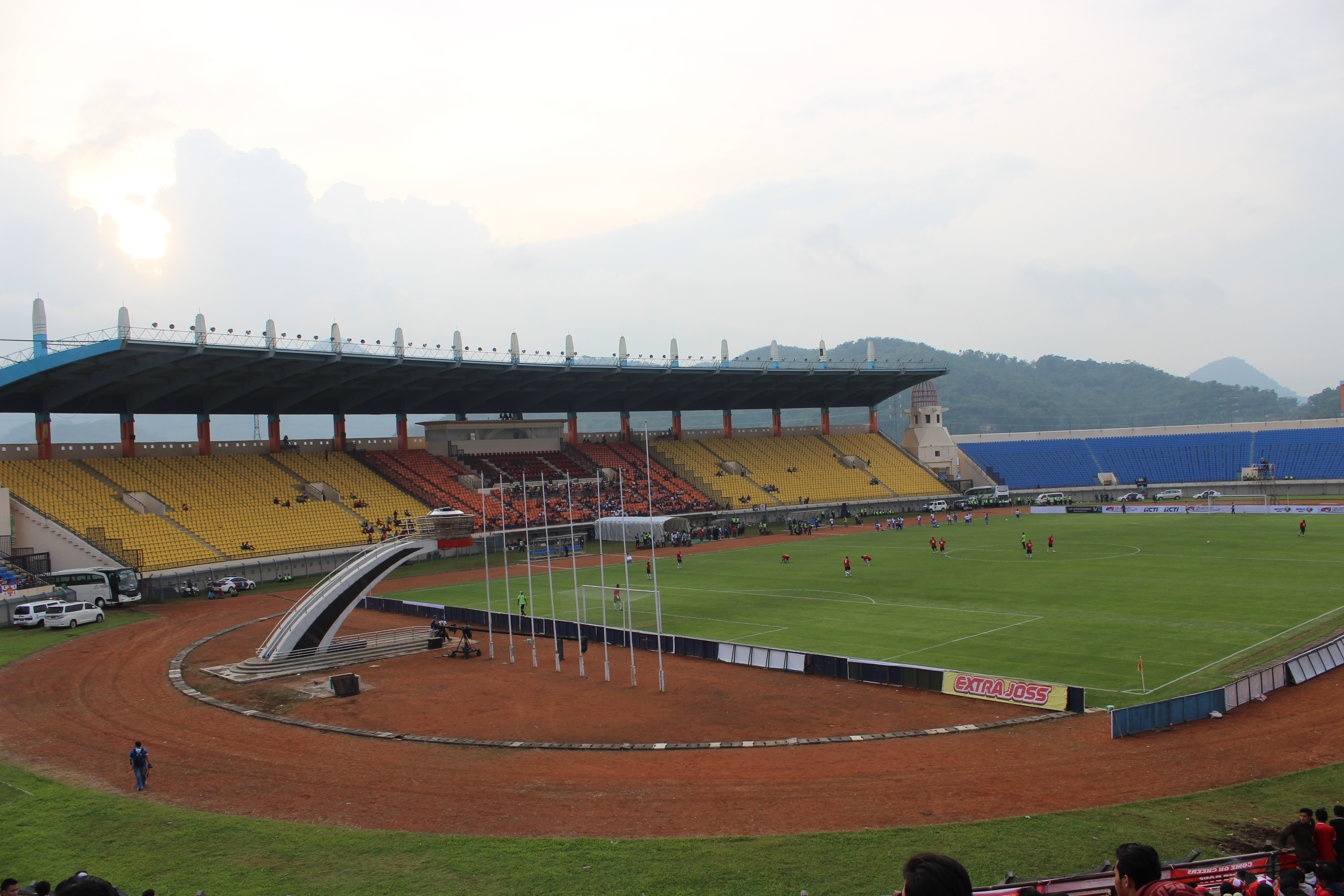
- Si Jalak Harupat Stadium
- Event: 2008–09 Indonesia Super League U-21
Persita U-21	Pelita Jaya U-21
(Indonesia)	(Indonesia)
1	2
- Date: 20 May 2009
- Venue: Jalak Harupat Stadium, Soreang, Bandung Regency
- ISL U-21 Man of the Match: Dedi Kusnandar (Pelita Jaya U-21)
- Referee: Armando Pribadi (Indonesia)
- Attendance: 3,000
- Weather: Fine

The 2008–09 Indonesia Super League U-21 Final was a football match which was played on 20 May 2009. It was the 1st final of the Indonesia Super League U-21. The match was played at the Jalak Harupat Stadium in Soreang, Bandung Regency and was contested by Persita U-21 of Tangerang and Pelita Jaya U-21 from Karawang. Pelita U-21 and Persita U-21 was a debutant of the final stage.

== Match details ==
20 May 2009
15:00 (WIB)

Persita U-21	1 – 2 (a.e.t.)	Pelita Jaya U-21
Maulana 53'	Report	20' Ferdinand Sinaga; 105' Jajang Mulyana

Jalak Harupat Stadium, Soreang, Bandung Regency
Attendance: 3,000
Referee: Armando Pribadi (Indonesia)

Persita U-21	Pelita Jaya U-21

Persita U-21: 4-4-2
GK	1	(Indonesia) Muhamad Ridwan
DF	5	(Indonesia) M. Adi Setiawan	(yellow card) 63'
DF	14	(Indonesia) Edi Hermawan	(substituted off) 35'
DF	25	(Indonesia) Heris Sandi
DF	26	(Indonesia) Sigit Cari Arto	(yellow card) 115'
MF	4	(Indonesia) Ade Jantra Lukmana(c)
MF	8	(Indonesia) Imam Santoso
MF	16	(Indonesia) Ade Mustari
MF	23	(Indonesia) Luthfi Adriansyah	(substituted off) 28'
FW	9	(Indonesia) Rishadi Fauzi
FW	19	(Indonesia) Frandiansyah	(yellow card) 65'
Substitutes
DF	2	(Indonesia) Muhamad Husen	(substituted on) 35'	(yellow card) 50' (yellow-red card) 76'
MF	6	(Indonesia) Mubarak Sembiring
MF	7	(Indonesia) Ali Yusmandri
DF	10	(Indonesia) Barkah Crustianhadi	(substituted on) 83'
MF	11	(Indonesia) Hendra Bastian
DF	13	(Indonesia) Maulana	(substituted on) 28'	(substituted off) 83'
GK	20	(Indonesia) Randi Erlangga
Manager
(Indonesia) Hendra

Pelita Jaya U-21: 4-4-2
GK	31	(Indonesia) Ali Barkah
DF	32	(Indonesia) Gilang Ginarsa	(substituted off) 68'
DF	45	(Indonesia) M. Syarif Yulianda
DF	66	(Indonesia) Rian Miziar	(yellow card) 92'
DF	94	(Indonesia) Tri Rahmad Priadi
MF	11	(Indonesia) Syafri Umri
MF	46	(Indonesia) Andesi Setyo Prabowo	(substituted off) 77'
MF	66	(Indonesia) Ferdinand Sinaga
MF	91	(Indonesia) Dedi Kusnandar (c)
FW	17	(Indonesia) Jajang Mulyana	(yellow card) 76'
FW	18	(Indonesia) Riski Novriansyah	(substituted off) 118'
Substitutes
DF	34	(Indonesia) Aldi Rinaldi
MF	39	(Indonesia) Rinto Ali
MF	41	(Indonesia) Muhamad Darusman	(substituted on) 77'
MF	42	(Indonesia) Riyandi Ramadhana
GK	79	(Indonesia) Shahar Ginanjar
MF	88	(Indonesia) Renald Yacob	(substituted on) 68'
FW	99	(Indonesia) Feriansyah Mas'ud	(substituted on) 118'
Head coach
(Indonesia) Djadjang Nurjaman

ISL U-21 Man of the Match:
(Indonesia) Dedi Kusnandar

== See also ==
- 2008–09 Indonesia Super League U-21
