= 2012–13 Indonesia Super League U-21 =

Indonesian Super League U-21
- Season: 2012-13
- Champions: Sriwijaya FC U-21 (1st title)
- Matches: 76
- Goals: 186 (2.45 per match)
- Top goalscorer: Rizky Dwi Ramadhana (9 goals)
- Highest scoring: Persisam Putra U-21 9-0 Barito Putera U-21 (10 June 2013)

The 2012–13 Indonesia Super League U-21 season was the fifth edition of Indonesia Super League U-21, a competition that are intended for footballers under the age of twenty-one years.

Persela U-21 is the defending champion in this season.

== Format ==
The competition is divided into four acts consist of two group stages and two knockout rounds, which is the semifinals and final. The first stage is divided into five groups each containing four clubs, two top teams of each group advanced to the second stage. The second stage consisted of two groups containing eight teams in each group, the two best teams from each group advanced to the semifinals. The winner advanced to the final to battle for the championship, while two teams who were defeated will play a third-placed match.

== First stage ==
First stage of the group stage started 27 April 2013 and ended on 16 June 2013.

Key to colours in group tables
Group winners and three best runners-up advances to the second group stage

=== Group 1 ===
Sriwijaya FC U-21 was the host in a home tournament with home and away format.

Team	Pld	W	D	L	GF	GA	GD	Pts
Sriwijaya FC U-21	6	5	1	0	12	3	+9	16
Persita U-21	6	3	2	1	14	3	+11	11
PSPS Pekanbaru U-21	6	2	1	3	8	10	-2	7
Persisko Tanjabbar U-21	6	0	0	6	0	16	-16	0

=== Group 2 ===
This group used normal home and away format.

Team	Pld	W	D	L	GF	GA	GD	Pts
Pelita Bandung Raya U-21	6	3	1	2	5	6	-1	10
Persela U-21	6	3	0	3	8	4	+4	9
Deltras U-21	6	2	2	2	5	7	-2	8
Persib U-21	6	2	1	3	2	3	-1	7

=== Group 3 ===
This group used normal home and away format.

Team	Pld	W	D	L	GF	GA	GD	Pts
Persija Jakarta U-21	6	5	0	1	7	2	+5	15
Persepam Pamekasan U-21	6	3	1	2	6	5	+1	10
Arema FC U-21	6	2	0	4	6	9	-3	6
Gresik United U-21	6	1	1	4	5	8	-3	4

=== Group 4 ===
Barito Putera U-21 was the host for the first half of the group and Mitra Kukar FC U-21 hosted the rest of the matches.

Team	Pld	W	D	L	GF	GA	GD	Pts
Mitra Kukar FC U-21	6	6	0	0	17	1	+16	18
Persisam Putra U-21	6	4	0	2	17	3	+14	12
Persiba U-21	6	1	1	4	3	12	-9	4
Barito Putera U-21	6	0	1	5	1	22	-21	1

=== Group 5 ===
Persipura U-21 was the host in a home tournament with home and away format.

Team	Pld	W	D	L	GF	GA	GD	Pts
Persipura U-21	6	5	1	0	12	1	+11	16
Persiram U-21	6	3	2	1	9	3	+6	11
Persidafon U-21	6	2	1	3	7	6	+1	7
Persiwa U-21	6	0	0	6	0	18	-18	0

Updated to games played on 16 July 2013.
Source: Statistics
Rules for classification: 1st points; 2nd goal difference; 3rd number of goals scored.
(C) = Champion; (R) = Relegated; (P) = Promoted; (O) = Play-off winner; (A) = Advances to a further round.
Only applicable when the season is not finished:
(Q) = Qualified to the phase of tournament indicated; (TQ) = Qualified to tournament, but not yet to the particular phase indicated; (DQ) = Disqualified from tournament.

== Second stage ==
The second stage started 19–25 August 2013 where each team will play other teams in their group once in a home tournament format.

Key to colours in group tables
Group winners and runners-up advanced to the semifinal

=== Group K ===
All matches were played in Gelora Sriwijaya Stadium and Bumi Sriwijaya Stadium.

Team	Pld	W	D	L	GF	GA	GD	Pts
Sriwijaya FC U-21	3	2	1	0	7	1	+6	7
Persija U-21	3	2	0	1	5	1	+4	6
Pelita Bandung Raya U-21	3	1	1	1	3	3	0	4
Persiram U-21	3	0	0	3	1	11	-10	0

=== Group L ===
All matches were played in Aji Imbut Stadium and Sempaja Stadium.

Team	Pld	W	D	L	GF	GA	GD	Pts
Mitra Kukar FC U-21	3	2	1	0	5	3	+2	7
Persipura U-21	3	1	2	0	4	2	+2	5
Persisam Putra U-21	3	1	1	1	6	4	+2	4
Persita U-21	3	0	0	3	4	10	-6	0

Updated to games played on 25 August 2013.
Source: Statistics
Rules for classification: 1st points; 2nd goal difference; 3rd number of goals scored.
(C) = Champion; (R) = Relegated; (P) = Promoted; (O) = Play-off winner; (A) = Advances to a further round.
Only applicable when the season is not finished:
(Q) = Qualified to the phase of tournament indicated; (TQ) = Qualified to tournament, but not yet to the particular phase indicated; (DQ) = Disqualified from tournament.

== Knockout stage ==
=== Semi-finals ===
4 September 2013
15:30

Sriwijaya FC U-21	2 – 0	Persipura U-21
Ramadhana 6'; Novrian 92'	Report

Kanjuruhan Stadium, Malang
Attendance: 107
Referee: Iwan Sukoco

4 September 2013
19:00

Mitra Kukar FC U-21	0 – 0 (a.e.t.)	Persija U-21
	Report
Penalties
Rahadian (penalty scored); Lopenda (penalty scored); Surahman (penalty scored); Samsudin (penalty scored)	4 – 2	(penalty scored) Nurillah; (penalty scored) Saefulloh

Kanjuruhan Stadium, Malang
Attendance: 113
Referee: Prasetyo Hadi

=== Third-placed ===
7 September 2013
15:15

Persipura U-21	0 – 2	Persija U-21
Dwaramuri 35' (pen.), 55'	Report

Kanjuruhan Stadium, Malang
Attendance: 90

=== Final ===
7 September 2013
18:45

Sriwijaya FC U-21	2 - 1	Mitra Kukar FC U-21
Martha 4'; Setiawan 57'	Report	Arpani 2'

Kanjuruhan Stadium, Malang
Attendance: 507

== Season statistics ==
=== Top goalscorers ===
Rank	Player	Club	Goals
1	(Indonesia) Rizsky Dwi Ramadhana	Sriwijaya FC U-21	9
2	(Indonesia) Arpani	Mitra Kukar FC U-21	7
3	(Indonesia) Faria Rofanda	Persisam Putra U-21	6
4	(Indonesia) Sirvi Arvani	Persita U-21	5
4	(Indonesia) Roy Fadlan	Mitra Kukar FC U-21	5
4	(Indonesia) Ali Surahman	Mitra Kukar FC U-21	5
4	(Indonesia) Abduh Lestaluhu	Persija U-21	5
4	(Indonesia) Gilbert Dwaramury	Persipura U-21	5
9	(Indonesia) M Anang Adi Nugraha	Sriwijaya FC U-21	4
9	(Indonesia) Tedi	Persisam Putra U-21	4
9	(Indonesia) Syamsul Bahri	Persita U-21	4
9	(Indonesia) Aldi Al Achya	Persita U-21	4

Statistics current as of 8 September 2013
Source: Statistics

== See also ==
- 2013 Indonesia Super League
- 2013 Liga Indonesia Premier Division (LI)
