= 2013 Persija Jakarta season =

Persija Jakarta
2013 season
- Chairman: Ferry Paulus
- Manager: Iwan Setiawan (until 18 March 2013); Benny Dollo (from 19 March 2013)
- Stadium: Gelora Bung Karno Stadium; Lebak Bulus Stadium; Manahan Stadium
- Indonesia Super League: 11th
- Top goalscorer: League: Emmanuel Kenmogne (14); All: Emmanuel Kenmogne (14)
- Highest home attendance: 21,463 (16 February vs Arema FC, Super League)
- Lowest home attendance: 0 (6 April vs Persiram Raja Ampat at Gelora Bung Karno Stadium, Super League)
- Average home league attendance: 8,642
| Home colours | Away colours | Third colours |

The 2013 season was Persija's 82nd competitive season. Persija finished in 11th place.

== Season overview ==
The team started the season with Iwan Setiawan as coach, but in the middle he was replaced by Benny Dollo. Persija now in 15th position Indonesia Super League standings. Fabiano be the captain of the team after Bambang Pamungkas not with Persija in this season. Had been in the bottom of the standings, now Persija up away from the relegation zone.

== Club ==
=== Coaching staff ===
| Position | Name |
|---|---|
| Manager | (Indonesia) Ferry Paulus |
| Assistant manager | (Indonesia) Ferry Indrasjarief |
| Head coach | (Indonesia) Benny Dollo |
| Assistant coach | (Indonesia) Hendri Susilo (Indonesia) Blitz Tarigan |
| Goalkeeping coach | (Indonesia) Galih Haryono |
| Fitness coach | (Indonesia) Eka Raka Galih |
| Youth Team Coach | (Indonesia) Gianto (Indonesia) Patar Tambunan |
| Doctor Team | (Indonesia) Nanang Tri Wahyudi |
| Masseur | (Indonesia) Amudi Saripudin (Indonesia) Muhammad Mansyur (Indonesia) Umar Bowi |

=== Kit ===
Supplier: League

| Home | Home Alt. | Home Alt.2º | Away | Third |

Persija third jersey this season is a repro from Persija home jersey in 1985. At the time Persija still use red as the color of the home jersey. But since 1997, the home jersey Persija changed to orange color.

=== Squad ===
As of 18 May 2013.

Note: Flags indicate national team as defined under FIFA eligibility rules; some limited exceptions apply. Players may hold more than one non-FIFA nationality.

| No. | Pos. | Nation | Player |
|---|---|---|---|
| 2 | DF | IDN | Mu'min Aliyansyah |
| 3 | DF | IDN | Muhammad Abduh Lestaluhu |
| 4 | MF | IDN | Fahreza Agamal |
| 5 | DF | IDN | Firmansyah |
| 9 | MF | IDN | Rudi Setiawan |
| 10 | MF | ARG | Robertino Pugliara |
| 11 | FW | IDN | Rachmat Afandi |
| 13 | MF | IDN | Fariz Nur Hisyam |
| 14 | DF | IDN | Ismed Sofyan (Vice captain) |
| 15 | DF | BRA | Fabiano Beltrame (Captain) |
| 16 | MF | IDN | Delton Stevano |
| 17 | FW | IDN | Anindito Wahyu Erminarno |
| 18 | FW | HKG | Lam Hok Hei (on loan from Biu Chun Rangers) |
| 19 | MF | IDN | Johan Juansyah |
| 21 | MF | IDN | Amarzukih |

| No. | Pos. | Nation | Player |
|---|---|---|---|
| 22 | GK | IDN | Galih Sudaryono |
| 26 | GK | IDN | Andritany Ardhiyasa |
| 27 | MF | IDN | Feri Komul |
| 28 | DF | IDN | AA Ngurah Wahyu |
| 29 | GK | IDN | Adixi Lenzivio |
| 30 | DF | NEP | Rohit Chand |
| 33 | DF | IDN | Syahrizal |
| 35 | GK | IDN | Daryono |
| 36 | DF | IDN | Glend Poluakan |
| 42 | FW | IDN | Fadhil Ibrahim |
| 59 | FW | CMR | Emmanuel Kenmogne |
| 77 | MF | IDN | Defri Rizki |
| 81 | MF | IDN | Muhammad Ilham |
| 87 | DF | IDN | Johan Alfarizi (on loan from Arema ISL) |
| 92 | MF | IDN | Syahroni |

=== Out on loan ===
Note: Flags indicate national team as defined under FIFA eligibility rules; some limited exceptions apply. Players may hold more than one non-FIFA nationality.

| No. | Pos. | Nation | Player |
|---|---|---|---|
| — | DF | IDN | Barkah Crustianhadi (at Persepam Madura United) |
| — | MF | IDN | Jarot (at Sriwijaya FC) |

== Transfers ==
=== In ===
| Player | Moving From |
|---|---|
| (Indonesia) Muhammad Ilham | (Indonesia) PSPS Pekanbaru |
| (Indonesia) Glend Poluakan | (Indonesia) PSPS Pekanbaru |
| (Nepal) Rohit Chand | (Indonesia) PSPS Pekanbaru |
| (Cameroon) Emmanuel Kenmogne | (Cyprus) Ethnikos Achna |
| (Indonesia) Anindito Wahyu Erminarno | (Indonesia) Mitra Kukar |
| (Indonesia) Barkah Crustianhadi | (Indonesia) Persepam Madura United |
| (Indonesia) Daryono | (Indonesia) Diklat Salatiga |
| (Indonesia) Defri Rizki | (Indonesia) Persiraja Banda Aceh |
| (Indonesia) Feri Komul | (Indonesia) PSAP Sigli |
| (Indonesia) Jarot | (Indonesia) Persikabo Bogor |
| (Indonesia) Mu'min Aliyansyah | (Indonesia) Persikabo Bogor |
| (Indonesia) Abduh Lestaluhu | (Indonesia) Persis Solo |
| (Indonesia) Syahrizal | (Indonesia) PSSB Bireun |
| (Indonesia) Syahroni | (Indonesia) Persibo Bojonegoro |
| (South Korea) Park Kyung-Min | (South Korea) Cheonan City |

=== Out ===
| Player | Moving To |
|---|---|
| (Paraguay) Pedro Velázquez | Free agent |
| (South Korea) Park Kyung-Min | (Indonesia) Pelita Bandung Raya |
| (Indonesia) Abdul Tommy | Free agent |
| (Indonesia) Ahmad Ikhwan | (Indonesia) Persiwa Wamena |
| (Indonesia) Alan Martha | (Indonesia) Persepar Palangkaraya |
| (Indonesia) Arief Dwi Wicaksono | Free agent |
| (Indonesia) Bagus Jiwo | (Indonesia) Persis Solo |
| (Indonesia) Bambang Pamungkas | Free agent |
| (Indonesia) Leo Saputra | (Indonesia) Persita Tangerang |
| (Indonesia) Oktavianus | (Indonesia) Persiba Bantul |
| (Indonesia) Ramdani Lestaluhu | (Indonesia) Sriwijaya FC |
| (Indonesia) Hasyim Kipuw | Arema Indonesia (ISL) |
| (Indonesia) Sahroni | Free agent |
| (Indonesia) Soleman Lubis | Free agent |
| (Singapore) Precious Emuejeraye | (Indonesia) Persiba Balikpapan |
| (South Korea) Jeong Kwang-Sik | Free agent |

== Matches ==
=== Indonesia Super League ===
| Date | Opponents | H / A | Result F – A | Scorers | Attendance |
|---|---|---|---|---|---|
| 6 January 2013 | Persisam Putra Samarinda | H | 1 - 1 | Pedro 25' | 13,550 |
| 12 January 2013 | Mitra Kukar | H | 1 - 2 | Pedro 20' | 12,450 |
| 26 January 2013 | PSPS Pekanbaru | H | 1 - 0 | Fabiano 37' | 9,631 |
| 2 February 2013 | Sriwijaya FC | A | 4 - 1 | Afandi 41' | 17,127 |
| 5 February 2013 | Pelita Bandung Raya | A | 3 - 2 | Kyeong Min 16', Afandi 75' | 1,323 |
| 12 February 2013 | Gresik United | H | 2 - 2 | Pedro 53', Kyeong Min 55' | 5,290 |
| 16 February 2013 | Arema Indonesia | H | 2 - 1 | Pedro 3' | 21,463 |
| 26 February 2013 | Persita Tangerang | A | 0 - 1 | Afandi 11' | 3,350 |
| 3 March 2013 | Persib Bandung | A | 3 - 1 | Pedro 47' | 26,587 |
| 14 March 2013 | Persepam Madura United | H | 0 - 3 | | 2,753 |
| 30 March 2013 | Persiwa Wamena | A | 2 - 0 | | 3,375 |
| 2 April 2013 | Persipura Jayapura | A | 1 - 0 | | 17,560 |
| 6 April 2013 | Persiram Raja Ampat | H | 0 - 1 | | 0 |
| 14 April 2013 | Persidafon Dafonsoro | H | 1 - 1 | Robertino 88' | 0 |
| 24 April 2013 | Barito Putera | A | 1 - 2 | Robertino 80' | 7,599 |
| 28 April 2013 | Persiba Balikpapan | A | 0 - 1 | Rudi 5' | 4,215 |
| 11 May 2013 | Persiba Balikpapan | H | 2 - 0 | Nanak 16' | 3,687 |
| 15 May 2013 | PS Barito Putera | H | 3 - 1 | Fabiano 50', Pacho 77', M. Ilham 89' | 5,127 |
| 22 May 2013 | Persiram Raja Ampat | A | 0 - 0 | | 757 |
| 26 May 2013 | Persidafon Dafonsoro | A | 0 - 1 | Pacho 45' | 9,455 |
| 1 June 2013 | Persiwa Wamena | H | 3 - 0 | Afandi 9', Fabiano 68', Pacho 89' | 0 |
| 4 June 2013 | Persipura Jayapura | H | 2 - 3 | Pacho 9', 45' | 16,748 |
| 13 June 2013 | Persepam Madura United | A | 0 - 1 | Rohit 45+2' | 12,389 |
| 16 June 2013 | Persela Lamongan | A | 1 - 1 | Alfarizi 65' | 13,000 |
| 13 June 2013 | Persita Tangerang | H | 5 - 0 | Pacho 15' 78', Rohit 58', Robertino 50', Anindito 72' | 13,755 |

== See also ==
- 2013 Indonesia Super League
