= Gherry Setya =

Indonesian footballer

Personal information
- Full name: Gherry Setya Adhi Nugraha
- Date of birth: 21 December 1988 (age 37)
- Place of birth: Tuban, Indonesia
- Height: 1.83 m (6 ft 0 in)
- Position: Striker

Youth career
- 2008–2009: Pelita Jaya U-21

Senior career*
Years	Team	Apps	(Gls)
2006	Persmin Minahasa		
2008–2009	Pelita Jaya		
2009–2010	Arema Indonesia	3	(0)
2011–2012	Persela Lamongan	31	(6)
2013–2014	Gresik United	21	(6)
2015–2017	Persatu Tuban	38	(8)

International career
2005–2006	Indonesia U19		
2007–2010	Indonesia U23		
- * Club domestic league appearances and goals

Gherry Setya Adhi Nugraha (born 21 December 1988) is an Indonesian former footballer.

== Hounors ==
Pelita Jaya U-21

- Indonesia Super League U-21: 2008–09

Arema Indonesia

- Indonesia Super League: 2009–10
