= Tri Rahmad Priadi =

Indonesian footballer

Personal information
- Full name: Tri Rahmad Priadi
- Date of birth: 9 April 1989 (age 37)
- Place of birth: Bukittinggi, Indonesia
- Height: 1.75 m (5 ft 9 in)
- Position: Centre back

Youth career
- 2001–2007: Jatira Bandung
- 2008–2010: Pelita Jaya

Senior career*
Years	Team	Apps	(Gls)
2007–2008	Persiko Kota Baru	0	(0)
2009–2012	Pelita Jaya	5	(0)
2013	Persibo Bojonegoro	12	(0)
2014	PSP Padang	10	(0)
2015	Perssu Sumenep	0	(0)
2016	Persis Solo	3	(0)
2017	PS Sumbawa Barat	11	(0)
2018	PSPS Pekanbaru	7	(0)
2019	Cilegon United	1	(0)
2019–2021	Persiraja Banda Aceh	15	(0)
2021	Semen Padang	7	(1)
2022	PSCS Cilacap	7	(0)
2023	PSPS Riau	2	(1)
2023–2024	PSKC Cimahi	11	(1)
2024–2025	Persebi Boyolali	6	(0)
2025–2026	Persika 1951	13	(0)
- * Club domestic league appearances and goals as of 6 June 2026

Tri Rahmad Priadi (born 9 April 1989, in Bukittinggi) is an Indonesian former footballer who plays as a centre back.

== Club statistics ==
Club	Season	Super League		Premier Division		Piala Indonesia		Total	
Club	Season	Apps	Goals	Apps	Goals	Apps	Goals	Apps	Goals
Pelita Jaya FC	2009-10	0	0	-		1	0	1	0
Pelita Jaya FC	2010-11	5	0	-		-		5	0
Pelita Jaya FC	2011-12	0	0	-		-		0	0
Total		5	0	-		1	0	6	0

== Honours ==
=== Club ===
Pelita Jaya U-21

- Indonesia Super League U-21: 2008-09; runner-up 2009-10

Persiraja Banda Aceh

- Liga 2 third place (play-offs): 2019

Persebi Boyolali

- Liga 4 Central Java: 2024–25

Persika 1951

- Liga 4 West Java Series 1, runner up: 2025–26
