= Arnold Muchlis Haay =

Indonesian footballer

Muchlis Haay
Personal information
- Full name: Arnold Muchlis Haay
- Date of birth: 28 August 1990 (age 36)
- Place of birth: Indonesia
- Height: 1.67 m (5 ft 5 1/2 in)
- Position: Right back

Youth career
- 2007–2008: Persidafon U-19
- 2008–2011: Persipura U-21

Senior career*
Years	Team	Apps	(Gls)
2013–2014	Persidafon Dafonsoro	19	(0)
2014–2015	PSBS Biak	3	(0)
2018–2019	Persewar Waropen	8	(0)

International career^{‡}
2013	Indonesia U23	0	(0)
- * Club domestic league appearances and goals as of 15 September 2013 ‡ National team caps and goals as of 8 June 2013

Arnold Muchlis Haay (born on August 28, 1990) is an Indonesia footballer who plays as a defender.
