= Jajang Mulyana =

Indonesian footballer

Personal information
- Full name: Jajang Mulyana
- Date of birth: 23 October 1988 (age 38)
- Place of birth: Sumedang, Indonesia
- Height: 1.82 m (6 ft 0 in)
- Position: Centre-back

Team information
- Current team: PSS Sleman
- Number: 73

Youth career
- 2004−2006: Persib Bandung

Senior career*
Years	Team	Apps	(Gls)
2007−2011	Pelita Jaya	50	(9)
2008	→ Boavista (loan)	8	(1)
2011	→ Sriwijaya (loan)	8	(2)
2011–2015	Mitra Kukar	81	(22)
2015–2016	Borneo	14	(2)
2016	Martapura	5	(2)
2017–2022	Bhayangkara	73	(3)
2022–2024	Bali United	42	(2)
2024–2025	Persiku Kudus	20	(3)
2025–	PSS Sleman	13	(0)

International career
2008	Indonesia U21	4	(3)
2006−2011	Indonesia U23	12	(6)
- * Club domestic league appearances and goals as of 9 May 2026

Jajang Mulyana (born 23 October 1988 in Sumedang) is an Indonesian professional footballer who plays as a centre-back for Liga 2 club PSS Sleman.

== International career ==
In 2007, Jajang represented the Indonesia U23, in the 2007 SEA Games.

== Honours ==
=== Club ===
Pelita Jaya U-21

- Indonesia Super League U-21: 2008–09

Bhayangkara

- Liga 1: 2017

PSS Sleman

- Championship runner up: 2025–26
