= Mario Rokhmanto =

Indonesian footballer

Personal information
- Full name: Mario Rokhmanto
- Date of birth: 16 July 1992 (age 34)
- Place of birth: Lamongan, Indonesia
- Height: 1.75 m (5 ft 9 in)
- Position: Defender

Youth career
- 2009–2012: Persela U-21

Senior career*
Years	Team	Apps	(Gls)
2011–2015	Persela Lamongan	56	(0)
- * Club domestic league appearances and goals as of March 2015

Mario Rokhmanto (born July 16, 1992) is an Indonesian former footballer who plays as a defender.

== Club statistics ==
Club	Season	Super League		Premier Division		Piala Indonesia		Total	
Club	Season	Apps	Goals	Apps	Goals	Apps	Goals	Apps	Goals
Persela Lamongan	2011-12	3	0	-		-		3	0
Total		3	0	-		-		3	0

== Hounors ==
=== Clubs ===
- Persela U-21 :
  - Indonesia Super League U-21 champions : 2 (2010-11, 2012)
