= Rinto Ali =

Indonesian footballer

Personal information
- Full name: Rinto Ali
- Date of birth: 2 March 1989 (age 37)
- Place of birth: Ternate, Indonesia
- Height: 1.70 m (5 ft 7 in)
- Positions: Midfielder; full-back

Youth career
- 2008–2010: Pelita Jaya

Senior career*
Years	Team	Apps	(Gls)
2010–2013	Jakarta FC 1928	35	(5)
2014–2016	Cilegon United	10	(3)
2017	PS TNI	3	(0)
2017–2019	Cilegon United	39	(6)
2020	Persija	0	(0)
2020	→ Cilegon United (loan)	0	(0)
2021	Badak Lampung	2	(0)
- * Club domestic league appearances and goals

Rinto Ali (born 2 March 1989) is an Indonesian professional footballer. His usual position is as a midfielder, but also occasionally plays in full-back.

== Club career ==
=== Persija Jakarta ===
He was signed for Persija Jakarta to play in Liga 1 in the 2020 season.

==== Cilegon United (loan) ====
He was signed for Cilegon United to play in the Liga 2 in the 2020 season, on loan from Persija Jakarta. This season was suspended on 27 March 2020 due to the COVID-19 pandemic. The season was abandoned and was declared void on 20 January 2021.

=== Badak Lampung ===
In 2021, Rinto Ali signed a contract with Indonesian Liga 2 club Badak Lampung. He made his league debut on 1 November 2021 in a match against Persekat Tegal at the Gelora Bung Karno Madya Stadium, Jakarta.

== Honours ==
=== Club ===
Pelita Jaya U-21

- Indonesia Super League U-21: 2008–09; runner-up 2009–10
