= 2008–09 Indonesia Super League U-21 =

Indonesian Super League U-21
- Season: 2009-10
- Champions: Pelita Jaya U-21
- Matches: 100
- Top goalscorer: Aditya Putra Dewa (10 goals)

The 2008–09 Indonesia Super League U-21 season will be the first edition of Indonesia Super League U-21 (ISL U-21), a companion competition Indonesian super league that are intended for footballers under the age of twenty-one years.

Djarum, an Indonesian tobacco company will continue its participation as the competition's main sponsor.

== Format ==
The competition is divided into three acts consist of two round the group and knockout round. The first round is divided into three groups each containing six clubs, two top teams of each group advanced to the second round. The second half consisted of two groups containing three teams in each group intended, the two best teams from each group advanced to the semifinals. The winner advanced to the final semi-final, while two teams who defeated third-ranked fight. Final winner becomes the champion.

== Current clubs ==
Grup I	Grup II	Grup III
Pelita Jaya U-21	Persib Bandung U-21	PSM Makassar U-21
Persita U-21	Persela U-21	Persipura U-21
Persija Jakarta U-21	Persik Kediri U-21	Persiba U-21
Persitara U-21	Arema FC U-21	Deltras Sidoarjo U-21
Sriwijaya FC U-21	PSIS Semarang U-21	Persiwa Wamena U-21
PSMS Medan U-21	Persijap U-21	Bontang FC U-21

== Top scorer ==
Rank	Pemain	Klub	Jumlah Gol
1	Aditya Putra Dewa	PSM Makassar U-21	9
2	Rudi Geovani	Persib Bandung U-21	7
2	Rishadi Fauzi	Persita U-21	7
3	Yongky Ariwibowo	Persik kediri U-21	6
3	Gherry Setya	Pelita Jaya U-21	6
3	Riski Novriansyah	Pelita Jaya U-21	6
4	Alan Aronggear	Persipura U-21	5
4	Taqwa Ihlas	PSM Makassar U-21	5
4	Maulana	Persita U-21	5
4	Aan Andikl Prayitno	Persik Kediri U-21	5

== Winner ==
Pelita Jaya U-21

== Awards ==
Season	Best player	Top scorer	Fair play
2008-09	Dedi Kusnandar (Pelita U-21)	Aditya Putra Dewa (PSM U-21) = 10 Goal	Persik U-21
