= Aditya Putra Dewa =

Indonesian footballer

Personal information
- Full name: Aditya Putra Dewa
- Date of birth: 11 June 1990 (age 36)
- Place of birth: Makassar, Indonesia
- Height: 1.75 m (5 ft 9 in)
- Position: Left-back

Youth career
- 2008–2009: PSM Makassar

Senior career*
Years	Team	Apps	(Gls)
2009−2012	PSM Makassar	18	(1)
2013−2014	Madura United	27	(1)
2015	PSM Makassar	2	(1)
2016	Persepam Madura Utama	15	(5)
2017	757 Kepri Jaya	8	(3)
2017	Persepam Madura Utama	8	(2)
2018	Martapura	19	(4)
2018	PSS Sleman	7	(1)
2019	PSIM Yogyakarta	8	(0)
2020	Persikabo	1	(0)
2021–2023	PSIM Yogyakarta	22	(4)
2022	→ PSM Makassar (loan)	2	(0)
2023	→ Barito Putera (loan)	16	(1)
2023–2024	Malut United	16	(0)
Total		169	(23)

International career
2012	Indonesia	1	(0)
- * Club domestic league appearances and goals as of 9 March 2024

Aditya Putra Dewa (born 11 June 1990) is a former professional footballer who plays as a left-back is an Indonesian footballer and current football coach for Liga 1 club Malut United.

== International career ==
He made his debut for Indonesia in 2014 FIFA World Cup qualification against Bahrain on 29 February 2012.

== Honours ==
=== Club ===
PSS Sleman

- Liga 2: 2018

Malut United

- Liga 2 third place (play-offs): 2023–24

=== Individual ===
- Indonesia Super League U-21 Top Goalscorer: 2008-09 (10 goals)
