= Riski Novriansyah =

Indonesian footballer

Personal information
- Full name: Riski Novriansyah
- Date of birth: 23 November 1989 (age 36)
- Place of birth: Pangkal Pinang, Indonesia
- Height: 1.76 m (5 ft 9 in)
- Position: Striker

Youth career
- Persipas Pangkal Pinang
- 2008–2009: Pelita Jaya

Senior career*
Years	Team	Apps	(Gls)
2007–2009	Pelita Jaya	12	(0)
2008	→ Boavista (loan)	0	(0)
2009–2010	PPSM Sakti Magelang	17	(10)
2010–2011	Persijap Jepara	24	(6)
2011–2012	Sriwijaya	25	(2)
2013	Gresik United	27	(3)
2013–2014	Persiba Balikpapan	14	(0)
2015	Persita Tangerang	0	(0)
2016–2017	PSS Sleman	41	(13)
2018	Persika Karawang	7	(0)
2018–2019	Semen Padang	31	(8)
2019	Babel United	8	(4)
2020	PSMS Medan	0	(0)
2021	Persijap Jepara	0	(0)
2021	PSG Pati	9	(1)
2022–2024	Persipa Pati	18	(5)
2025–2026	Persibas Banyumas	7	(5)

International career
2007	Indonesia U19	4	(2)
2008	Indonesia U21	4	(1)
- * Club domestic league appearances and goals as of 22:20, 1 February 2026 (UTC)

Riski Novriansyah (born 23 November 1989) is an Indonesian professional footballer who plays as a striker.

== Club career ==
=== PSMS Medan ===
He was signed for PSMS Medan to play in Liga 2 in the 2020 season. This season was suspended on 27 March 2020 due to the COVID-19 pandemic. The season was abandoned and was declared void on 20 January 2021.

=== PSG Pati ===
In 2021, Riski signed a contract with Indonesian Liga 2 club PSG Pati. He made his 2021–22 Liga 2 debut on 26 September 2021, coming on as a starter in a 2–0 loss with Persis Solo at the Manahan Stadium, Surakarta.

=== Persipa Pati ===
Novriansyah was signed for Persipa Pati to play in Liga 2 in the 2022–23 season. He made his league debut on 30 August 2022 in a match against Nusantara United at the Moch. Soebroto Stadium, Magelang.

== Honours ==
=== Club ===
Pelita Jaya U-21

- Indonesia Super League U-21: 2008–09

Sriwijaya

- Indonesia Super League: 2011–12

Semen Padang

- Liga 2 runner-up: 2018
