= Iman Budi Hernandi =

Indonesian association footballer

Personal information
- Full name: Iman Budi Hernandi
- Date of birth: 13 July 1993 (age 33)
- Place of birth: Malang, Indonesia
- Height: 1.70 m (5 ft 7 in)
- Position: Defensive midfielder

Youth career
- 2014–2013: Arema Cronus
- 2013: PON East Java

Senior career*
Years	Team	Apps	(Gls)
2013–2014	Arema Cronus	6	(0)
2014	→ Perseba Bangkalan (loan)	10	(0)
2015	Laga FC	0	(0)
2015–2016	Persela Lamongan	4	(0)
2017	Persik Kediri	11	(1)
2018	Madura	25	(3)
2019–2021	Persis Solo	19	(4)
2021	Persela Lamongan	3	(0)
2021–2022	PSMS Medan	12	(1)
2023–2024	Arema	2	(0)
2023–2024	→ Persikab Bandung (loan)	13	(0)
2024–2025	RANS Nusantara	19	(0)
2025	PSIS Semarang	3	(0)
- * Club domestic league appearances and goals as of 19 October 2025

Iman Budi Hernandi (born 13 July 1993) is an Indonesian professional footballer who plays as a defensive midfielder.

== Career ==
=== Early career ===
Hernandi made his football career with Arema U21. And In early 2014, he was loaned to Perseba Bangkalan and brought this team to the Second Division after champion in the Third Division.

=== Laga FC ===
He took part in Laga FC which will compete in 2015 Liga Indonesia Premier Division.

=== Persela Lamongan ===
He joined Persela Lamongan for 2015 Indonesia President's Cup and 2016 Indonesia Soccer Championship A.

=== Persik kediri ===
He was signed for Persik Kediri to play in Liga 2 in the 2017 season. He made 11 league appearances and scored 1 goal for Persik Kediri.

=== Madura FC ===
In 2018, Hernandi signed a one-year contract with Indonesian Liga 2 club Madura. He made 25 league appearances and scored 3 goals for Madura FC.

=== Persis Solo ===
He was signed for Persis Solo to play in Liga 2 in the 2019 season. He made his debut on 22 June 2019, in a 0–0 draw over Mitra Kukar. Hernandi played the full 90 minutes of the match against Persiba Balikpapan at Batakan Stadium on 27 June, which Persis Solo lose 3–0. On 29 July, Hernandi scored his first league goal for Persis to give the Laskar Sambernyawa a 2–0 victory over Sulut United at the Wilis Stadium. On 3 August, Hernandi was a starter in a match against Persewar Waropen at Wilis Stadium, also scored a penalty in the 62nd minute in a 1–0 victory, with the result, Persis Solo records six-game unbeaten streak. During 2019 season, Hernandi made 19 league appearances and scored 4 goals for Persis Solo.

=== Return to Persela Lamongan ===
Iman decided to re-join and signed a contract with former club Persela Lamongan. Iman made his league debut on 10 September 2021 in a match against Persipura Jayapura at the Wibawa Mukti Stadium, Cikarang. This season Henandi only appeared 3 times with Persela, he only recorded a total of 62 minutes of play in those three appearances.

=== PSMS Medan ===
In 2021, Iman signed a contract with Indonesian Liga 2 club PSMS Medan. He made his league debut on 4 November 2021 in a match against KS Tiga Naga. Iman scored his first goal for PSMS in the 5th minute at the Kaharudin Nasution Rumbai Stadium, Pekanbaru. On 30 November, Hernandi provided an assist a corner kick for Zikri Akbar in a 1–2 win over Sriwijaya, with this result, PSMS certainly qualified for the Liga 2 play-offs. PSMS managed to finish as Group A champions with 20 points. He made eight appearances for PSMS Medan during the 2021–22 season, scoring one goal and making one assist.

On 10 September 2022, he made his start of the new season, in a North Sumatran derby against Karo United at Teladan Stadium. The game ended in a 1–0 victory for PSMS Medan. Following the dissolution of the PSMS Medan squad due to the 2022–23 Liga 2 not continuing the effects of the heartbreaking tragedy, he and his teammates chose to leave the club, and try a trial at one of the Liga 1 club.

=== Return to Arema ===
On 29 January 2023, Hernandi signed a contract with Liga 1 club Arema from PSMS Medan. Hernandi made his league debut for the club in a 1–2 win against RANS Nusantara, coming on as a substituted Gian Zola.
