= Cristian Rotinsulu =

Indonesian footballer

Personal information
- Full name: Cristian Rotinsulu
- Date of birth: 20 December 1992 (age 33)
- Place of birth: Palembang, Indonesia
- Height: 1.78 m (5 ft 10 in)
- Position: Defender

Youth career
- 2005–2007: Sriwijaya
- 2008–2012: Sriwijaya FC U-21

Senior career*
Years	Team	Apps	(Gls)
2011–2014	Sriwijaya	29	(0)
- * Club domestic league appearances and goals as of 5 July 2012

Cristian Rotinsulu (born 20 December 1992, in Palembang, South Sumatra) is an Indonesian former footballer.

== Honours ==
=== Club honours ===
Sriwijaya

- Indonesia Super League (1): 2012-2013
