= Paulus Hisage =

Indonesian footballer

Personal information
- Full name: Paulus Hisage
- Date of birth: 27 November 1994 (age 31)
- Place of birth: Wamena, Indonesia
- Height: 1.60 m (5 ft 3 in)
- Positions: Midfielder; striker

Youth career
- 2009–2012: Persiwa U-21

Senior career*
Years	Team	Apps	(Gls)
2010–2015	Persiwa Wamena	52	(20)
2013 (4 month)	→Yahukimo (loan)	7	(2)
2016–2017	Perseru Serui	21	(1)
- * Club domestic league appearances and goals

Paulus Hisage (born 27 November 1994) is an Indonesian former footballer.

== Personal life ==
After retiring as a footballer in 2017, he served as the principal of SD Katolik Bunda Maria in Serui.
