= Delton Stevano =

Indonesian footballer

Personal information
- Full name: Delton Stevano Wohon
- Date of birth: 16 September 1992 (age 34)
- Place of birth: Jakarta, Indonesia
- Height: 1.82 m (6 ft 0 in)
- Position: Midfielder

Youth career
- 2010–2012: Persija U-21

Senior career*
Years	Team	Apps	(Gls)
2011–2015	Persija Jakarta	19	(0)
2014	→ Villa 2000 (loan)	6	(1)

International career
2007–2008	Indonesia U 16		
- * Club domestic league appearances and goals as of 4 December 2014

Delton Stevano Wohon (born September 16, 1992) is an Indonesian former footballer.

== Club statistics ==
Club	Season	Persija Jakarta		Premier Division		Piala Indonesia		Total	
Club	Season	Apps	Goals	Apps	Goals	Apps	Goals	Apps	Goals
Persija Jakarta	2011-12	7	0	-		-		7	0
Total		7	0	-		-		7	0
