= Dedi Kusnandar =

Indonesian footballer

Personal information
- Full name: Dedi Kusnandar
- Date of birth: 23 July 1991 (age 35)
- Place of birth: Sumedang, Indonesia
- Height: 1.75 m (5 ft 9 in)
- Position: Midfielder

Team information
- Current team: Persib Bandung
- Number: 11

Youth career
- 2005–2008: Persib Bandung
- 2008–2010: Pelita Jaya

Senior career*
| Years | Team | Apps | (Gls) |
| 2008–2012 | Pelita Jaya | 59 | (3) |
| 2012–2013 | Arema Cronus | 22 | (1) |
| 2013–2014 | Bhayangkara | 19 | (1) |
| 2014–2015 | Persib Bandung | 16 | (0) |
| 2016 | Sabah | 21 | (3) |
| 2017– | Persib Bandung | 176 | (0) |
| 2025–2026 | → Bhayangkara (loan) | 6 | (0) |

International career^{‡}
| 2008 | Indonesia U17 | 2 | (0) |
| 2012–2014 | Indonesia U23 | 17 | (1) |
| 2014–2018 | Indonesia | 6 | (0) |
Medal record
Men's football
Representing Indonesia
Islamic Solidarity Games
| Silver medal – second place | 2013 Palembang | Team |
Southeast Asian Games
| Silver medal – second place | 2013 Naypyidaw | Team |
AFF Championship
| Runner-up | 2016 Myanmar & Philippines | Team |
- * Club domestic league appearances and goals as of 1 November 2026 ‡ National team caps and goals as of 10 October 2018

Dedi Kusnandar or Dado (born 23 July 1991) is an Indonesian professional footballer who plays as a midfielder for Super League club Persib Bandung.

== Club career ==
Dedi start his club career playing with Pelita Jaya FC in 2008, before moving to Arema Cronus F.C. in 2012. He then played with Persebaya ISL (Bhayangkara) for two years before moving to Persib Bandung in 2014. In 2016, he played in the Malaysian Premier League for Sabah FA before returned to Persib Bandung for the 2017 edition.

== International career ==
He made his international debut on 15 May 2014, in a 1–1 draw against Dominican Republic.

== Career statistics ==
=== International ===
As of match played 10 October 2018

Appearances and goals by national team and year
| National team | Year | Apps | Goals |
|---|---|---|---|
| Indonesia | 2014 | 1 | 0 |
| Indonesia | 2016 | 4 | 0 |
| Indonesia | 2018 | 1 | 0 |
| Total | | 6 | 0 |

=== International goals ===
Dedi Kusnandar: International under-23 goals

| Goal | Date | Venue | Opponent | Score | Result | Competition |
|---|---|---|---|---|---|---|
| 1 | 2 April 2014 | Hougang Stadium, Hougang, Singapore | Singapore | 1–2 | 1–2 | Friendly |

== Honours ==
Persib U–18

- Soeratin Cup: 2006

Pelita Jaya U–21

- Indonesia Super League U-21: 2008–09; runner–up 2009–10

Arema Cronus

- Menpora Cup: 2013
- Runner Up ISL 2013

Persib Bandung

- Liga 1/Super League: 2023–24, 2024–25, 2025–26
- Indonesia President's Cup: 2015, runner-up: 2026

Indonesia U–23

- SEA Games silver medal: 2013
- Islamic Solidarity Games silver medal: 2013

Indonesia

- AFF Championship runner-up: 2016

Individual

- Indonesia Super League U-21 Best Player: 2008–09
