= Mardian =

Mardian is a surname. Notable people with the surname include:

- Robert Mardian (1923–2006), American government official
- Sam Mardian (1919–2015), American businessman and politician

== See also ==
- Amardi
