= Muhaimin =

Muhaimin is a name. People with the name include:

- Muhaimin Iskandar
- Muhaimin Izuddin
- Muhaimin Mohamad
- Muhaimin Omar
- Muhammad Muhaimin Harith Abdullah Sani
- Abdul Muhaimin
- Yahya A. Muhaimin
- Muhaimin Suhaimi

== See also ==
- 2024 Indonesian presidential election#Anies–Muhaimin
