= Wismoyo Widhistio =

Indonesian footballer

Personal information
- Full name: Wismoyo Widhistio Putra
- Date of birth: 30 November 1991 (age 34)
- Place of birth: Gresik, Indonesia
- Height: 1.73 m (5 ft 8 in)
- Position: Defender

Youth career
- Gresik United

Senior career*
Years	Team	Apps	(Gls)
2011–2013	Gresik United	30	(0)
2013–2014	Persela Lamongan	17	(0)
2016–2017	Gresik United	18	(0)
2017	PSBK Blitar	11	(0)
2017–2018	Sragen United	5	(0)
2018–2019	Gresik United	17	(0)
- * Club domestic league appearances and goals

Wismoyo Widhistio (born November 30, 1991) is an Indonesian footballer who plays as a defender.
