= Dimas Galih Gumilang =

Indonesian footballer (born 1991)

Personal information
- Full name: Dimas Galih Gumilang
- Date of birth: 15 November 1991 (age 34)
- Place of birth: Sukoharjo, Indonesia
- Height: 1.72 m (5 ft 8 in)
- Position: Forward

Team information
- Current team: Persinga Ngawi

Youth career
- 2010–2012: Pelita Jaya

Senior career*
Years	Team	Apps	(Gls)
2013–2014	Persik Kediri	22	(8)
2015–2016	PSGC Ciamis	13	(1)
2017	Persepam Madura Utama	16	(3)
2018	Persiba Balikpapan	10	(0)
2018	Persik Kendal	9	(1)
2019	Persis Solo	10	(1)
2020	PSS Sleman	0	(0)
2021	PSPS Riau	1	(0)
2021	Hizbul Wathan	4	(1)
2022	Kalteng Putra	4	(0)
2024–2025	PSM Madiun	11	(1)
2026–	Persinga Ngawi	0	(0)
- * Club domestic league appearances and goals as of 00:21, 10 February 2025 (UTC)

Dimas Galih Gumilang (born 15 November 1991) is an Indonesian professional footballer, who plays as a forward for Liga Nusantara club Persinga Ngawi.

== Club career ==
=== Persik Kediri ===
He scored his first goal for Persik in a 1–2 loss against Semen Padang.

=== PSGC Ciamis ===
In January 2015, he signed with PSGC.

== Honours ==
=== Individual ===
- Indonesia Super League U-21 Top Goalscorer: 2012 (Shared)
