= Akbar Tanjung (footballer) =

Indonesian association football player

Personal information
- Full name: Akbar Tanjung
- Date of birth: 16 May 1993 (age 33)
- Place of birth: Jakarta, Indonesia
- Height: 1.73 m (5 ft 8 in)
- Position: Defensive midfielder

Team information
- Current team: PSM Makassar
- Number: 45

Youth career
- 2016: PON DKI Jakarta

Senior career*
Years	Team	Apps	(Gls)
2015	Villa 2000	0	(0)
2017–2018	Cilegon United	39	(1)
2019–2020	Badak Lampung	30	(1)
2021	PSIM Yogyakarta	4	(0)
2022–	PSM Makassar	115	(0)
- * Club domestic league appearances and goals as of 16 October 2026

Akbar Tanjung (born 16 May 1993), is an Indonesian professional footballer who plays as a defensive midfielder for Super League club PSM Makassar.

== Club career ==
=== Badak Lampung ===
He was signed for Badak Lampung to play in Liga 1 in the 2019 season. Tanjung made his league debut on 18 May 2019 in a match against TIRA-Persikabo. On 12 December 2019, Tanjung scored his first goal for Badak Lampung against Bhayangkara in the 60th minute at the Sumpah Pemuda Stadium, Bandar Lampung.

=== PSIM Yogyakarta ===
In 2021, Akbar Tanjung signed a contract with Indonesian Liga 2 club PSIM Yogyakarta. He made his league debut on 26 September in a 1–0 loss against PSCS Cilacap at the Manahan Stadium, Surakarta.

=== PSM Makassar ===
Tanjung was signed for PSM Makassar to play in Liga 1 in the 2022–23 season. He made his league debut on 23 July 2022 in a match against PSS Sleman at the Maguwoharjo Stadium, Sleman.

== Career statistics ==
=== Club ===
As of match played 8 February 2026

Club	Season	League			Cup		Continental		Other		Total	
Club	Season	Division	Apps	Goals	Apps	Goals	Apps	Goals	Apps	Goals	Apps	Goals
Cilegon United	2017	Liga 2	19	1	0	0	0	0	0	0	19	1
Cilegon United	2018	Liga 2	20	0	0	0	0	0	0	0	20	0
Cilegon United	Total		39	1	0	0	0	0	0	0	39	1
Badak Lampung	2019	Liga 1	29	1	0	0	0	0	0	0	29	1
Badak Lampung	2020	Liga 2	1	0	0	0	0	0	0	0	1	0
Badak Lampung	Total		30	1	0	0	0	0	0	0	30	1
PSIM Yogyakarta	2021	Liga 2	4	0	0	0	0	0	0	0	4	0
PSM Makassar	2022–23	Liga 1	32	0	0	0	4 (Note: Appearances in AFC Cup)	1	4 (Note: Appearances in Indonesia President's Cup)	0	40	1
PSM Makassar	2023–24	Liga 1	28	0	0	0	4	0	0	0	32	0
PSM Makassar	2024–25	Liga 1	31	0	0	0	–		7 (Note: Appearances in ASEAN Club Championship)	0	38	0
PSM Makassar	2025–26	Super League	16	0	0	0	–		0	0	16	0
Career total			180	2	0	0	8	1	11	0	199	3

== Honours ==
PSM Makassar

- Liga 1: 2022–23
