= Martunis Sarbini =

Indonesian footballer (born 1997)

Personal information
- Full name: Martunis Sarbini
- Date of birth: 2 May 1997 (age 29)
- Place of birth: Banda Aceh, Indonesia
- Height: 1.78 m (5 ft 10 in)
- Position: Striker

Youth career
- Years: Team
- 2012–2015: PSAP Sigli
- 2015–2016: Sporting CP

Martunis Sarbini (born 2 May 1997), simply known as Martunis, is a former Indonesian footballer who played as a striker. He rose to fame in 2005 after surviving the 2004 Indian Ocean earthquake and tsunami and being found wandering along a beach by a group of journalists.

== Early life ==
Martunis was born in the village of Tibang, in the district of Syiah Kuala, Banda Aceh, Indonesia. On the morning of 26 December 2004, he was playing football with his friends in the pitch of his village when the tsunami struck. His mother and two sisters were amongst over 230,000 killed. He was stranded on a beach for 21 days and survived by holding onto a sofa. He was discovered by a group of journalists and found wearing a Portugal national team shirt with Rui Costa's name on the back. Due to the dehydration that he had suffered, he needed a saline drip and was said to be frail and badly bitten. His condition was so poor that a member of the Save the Children team that found him noted that if he had been found a day later, he would have perished. Later on, Martunis was reunited with his father.

When images of him wearing the Portuguese shirt surfaced, they generated massive sympathy for him, being splashed all across international publications. This attracted the attention of the Portuguese Football Federation (FPF) and Cristiano Ronaldo. The FPF donated €40,000 to help rebuild his house, while Ronaldo travelled to Banda Aceh to visit Martunis in 2005, where he promised to pay for his education and a tour of the Sporting CP stadium. Since then, the two have met multiple times.

Besides being invited to Portugal, in 2006, singer Madonna also invited Martunis and his father to London, where Madonna stayed with his family. They were both invited to tour the city's famous tourist spots, as well as other cities in the UK.

== Football career ==
Martunis was recruited by Sporting and became a member of their academy in Portugal. However, after a knee injury in 2016 during a charity match, Martunis retired from playing entirely.

== Life after football ==
After retiring from football, Martunis tried to join the police force, but apparently failed the admission test. Currently, he is a content creator, celebrity endorser and YouTuber. His channel mostly consists of football-related content.

On 24 April 2021, Martunis joined the Democratic Party and became one of its cadres. He supports Agus Harimurti Yudhoyono.
