= Arpani =

Indonesian professional footballer

Personal information
- Date of birth: June 13, 1994 (age 32)
- Place of birth: Kutai Kartanegara, Indonesia
- Height: 1.66 m (5 ft 5 1/2 in)
- Position: Midfielder

Youth career
- 2011–2015: Mitra Kukar U-21

Senior career*
Years	Team	Apps	(Gls)
2016–2017	Borneo F.C.	17	(2)
2017–2018	Mitra Kukar	11	(0)
- * Club domestic league appearances and goals as of 5 June 2016

Arpani (born 13 June 1994) is an Indonesian professional footballer who plays as a midfielder.
