= GOR Ciracas Stadium =

Multi-purpose stadium in East Jakarta, Indonesia

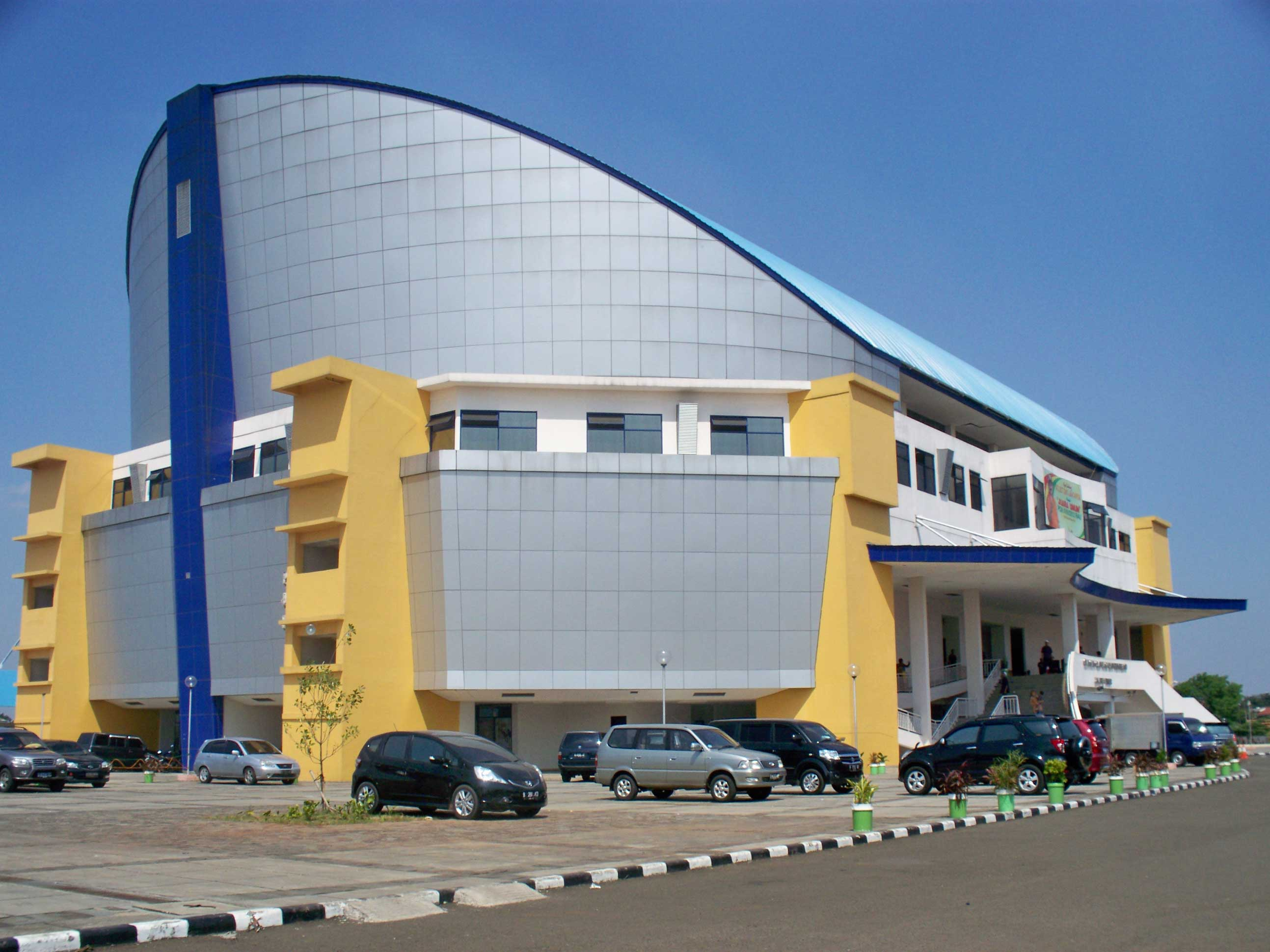
- Interactive map of GOR Ciracas Stadium
- Full name: Gelanggang Olahraga Ciracas
- Location: Ciracas, East Jakarta, Jakarta, Indonesia
- Coordinates: 6.3252356999999995°S 106.8656374°E
- Owner: Government of Jakarta
- Operator: Government of Jakarta
- Capacity: 5,000
- Surface: Grass field

Tenant
- none

GOR Ciracas Stadium is a multi-purpose stadium in the city of East Jakarta, Indonesia. The stadium has a capacity of 5,000 people.

It is the former home base of Villa 2000 After changed its name to Celebest FC in 2016 and moved to its current stadium in Gawalise Stadium in the same year.
