= Bayu Gatra =

Indonesian footballer (born 1991)

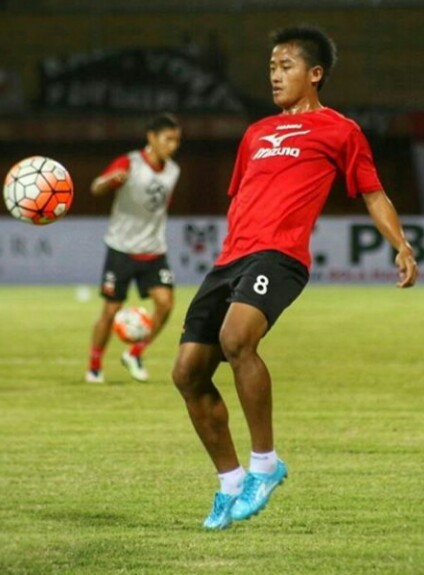
- Bayu Gatra with Madura United in 2017

Personal information
- Full name: Bayu Gatra Sanggiawan
- Date of birth: 11 November 1991 (age 34)
- Place of birth: Jember, Indonesia
- Height: 1.67 m (5 ft 6 in)
- Position: Winger

Team information
- Current team: Persekabpas Pasuruan

Youth career
- 2005–2007: Persid Jember
- 2008–2009: Persekap Pasuruan
- 2010–2012: Persisam U21

Senior career*
Years	Team	Apps	(Gls)
2010–2011	Persekap Pasuruan	9	(1)
2011–2015	Putra Samarinda	52	(7)
2015–2016	Bali United	2	(0)
2016–2018	Madura United	88	(9)
2019–2021	PSM Makassar	5	(0)
2021–2024	Madura United	74	(4)
2024–2025	Semen Padang	10	(0)
2025	→ Persela Lamongan (loan)	6	(0)
2025–2026	Sumsel United	13	(0)
2026–	Persekabpas Pasuruan	0	(0)

International career
2013–2014	Indonesia U23	14	(3)
2014–2016	Indonesia	5	(0)
Medal record
Men's football
Representing Indonesia
Islamic Solidarity Games
Silver medal – second place	2013 Palembang	Team
Southeast Asian Games
Silver medal – second place	2013 Naypyidaw	Team
AFF Championship
Runner-up	2016 Myanmar & Philippines	Team
- * Club domestic league appearances and goals as of 12 April 2026

Bayu Gatra Sanggiawan (born 11 November 1991) is an Indonesian professional footballer who plays as a winger for Liga Nusantara club Persekabpas Pasuruan.

== Personal life ==
Bayu Gatra was born to Lucky Supriya and Siti Holifah. He never fully went to school as a child and initially took up football as a career to help his family. He credits coach Rudy Keltjes for helping him recover from a knee injury. Bayu Gatra is a devout Muslim.

== International career ==
Gatra won his first cap for Indonesia in a friendly match against Andorra on March 26, 2014.

== Career statistics ==
=== International ===
As of match played 4 November 2016

Appearances and goals by national team and year
National team	Year	Apps	Goals
Indonesia	2014	2	0
Indonesia	2015	2	0
Indonesia	2016	1	0
Total		5	0

=== International goals ===
Bayu Gatra: International under-23 goals

Goal	Date	Venue	Opponent	Score	Result	Competition
1	22 November 2013	Gelora Bung Karno Stadium, Jakarta, Indonesia	Papua New Guinea U-23	5–0	6–0	2013 MNC Cup
2	19 December 2013	Zayyarthiri Stadium, Naypyidaw, Myanmar	Malaysia U-23	1–0	1–1	2013 Southeast Asian Games
3	18 September 2014	Incheon Football Stadium, Incheon, South Korea	Maldives U-23	3–0	4–0	2014 Asian Games

== Honours ==
=== Clubs ===
Persisam U-21

- Indonesia Super League U-21 runner-up: 2012

PSM Makassar

- Piala Indonesia: 2018–19

=== Country honors ===
Indonesia U-23

- Islamic Solidarity Games silver medal: 2013
- SEA Games silver medal: 2013

Indonesia

- AFF Championship runner-up: 2016
