= Wahyu Kristanto =

Indonesian footballer

Personal information
- Full name: Wahyu Kristanto
- Date of birth: 6 March 1992 (age 34)
- Place of birth: Sidoarjo, Indonesia
- Height: 1.77 m (5 ft 10 in)
- Position: Defender

Youth career
- 2010–2012: Persisam U21

Senior career*
Years	Team	Apps	(Gls)
2011–2015	Putra Samarinda	29	(0)
2016	Borneo	0	(0)
2017–2018	PSPS Riau	35	(2)
2019	Persis Solo	5	(0)
2020	PSPS Riau	1	(0)
2021	Mitra Kukar	0	(0)

International career^{‡}
2013	Indonesia U-23	1	(0)
- * Club domestic league appearances and goals as of 1 December 2019 ‡ National team caps and goals as of 13 July 2013

Wahyu Kristanto (born 6 March 1992) is an Indonesian former footballer who plays as a defender.

== Club career ==
=== PSPS Riau ===
He was signed for PSPS Riau to play in Liga 2 in the 2020 season. This season was suspended on 27 March 2020 due to the COVID-19 pandemic. The season was abandoned and was declared void on 20 January 2021.

== International career ==
He made his debut for Indonesia under-23 national team in friendly match against Singapore U-23 on 13 July 2013 with score 1–0 for Singapore.

== Honours ==
=== Club ===
Persisam Putra Samarinda U-21

- Indonesia Super League U-21 runner-up: 2012
