= Mochammad Solechudin =

Indonesian footballer

Personal information
- Full name: Mochammad Solechudin
- Date of birth: 11 May 1991 (age 35)
- Place of birth: Sidoarjo, Indonesia
- Height: 1.65 m (5 ft 5 in)
- Position: Midfielder

Youth career
- 2011–2012: Deltras Sidoarjo

Senior career*
Years	Team	Apps	(Gls)
2013–2014	Pelita Bandung Raya	6	(0)
2014	Persiba Bantul	6	(0)
2015	Persiba Balikpapan	1	(0)
2016	Madiun Putra	10	(2)
2016	Persiraja Banda Aceh	6	(0)
2017	Persita Tangerang	14	(1)
2017	Martapura	3	(1)
2018	Perserang Serang	9	(1)
2019	Martapura	11	(0)
2020	Persekat Tegal	1	(0)
2021–2022	Sleman United	3	(0)
- * Club domestic league appearances and goals as of 10 November 2021

Mochammad Solechudin (born May 11, 1991) is an Indonesian professional footballer who plays as a midfielder.

== Club career ==
=== Persekat Tegal ===
He was signed for Persekat Tegal to play in Liga 2 for the 2020 season. This season was suspended on 27 March 2020 due to the COVID-19 pandemic. The season was abandoned and was declared void on 20 January 2021.
