= Feriansyah =

Indonesian footballer

Feriansyah Mas'ud
Personal information
- Full name: Feriansyah Mas'ud
- Date of birth: 25 January 1991 (age 35)
- Place of birth: Palembang, Indonesia
- Height: 1.74 m (5 ft 8 1/2 in)
- Position: Striker

Youth career
- PS Palembang
- 2007: Persimuba Musi Banyuasin
- 2008–2011: Pelita Jaya U-21

Senior career*
| Years | Team | Apps | (Gls) |
| 2010–2012 | Pelita Jaya | 31 | (1) |
| 2012–2013 | Persepar Palangkaraya | 20 | (2) |
| 2013 | Persika Karawang | 12 | (4) |
- * Club domestic league appearances and goals

Feriansyah Mas'ud or just Feriansyah (born January 25, 1991) is an Indonesian former footballer.

== Honours ==
=== Club honors ===
Pelita Jaya U-21

- Indonesia Super League U-21 (1): 2008–09
