= Radiansyah =

Indonesian footballer

Rahel Radiansyah
Personal information
- Full name: Rahel Radiansyah
- Date of birth: 22 May 1991 (age 35)
- Place of birth: Palangka Raya, Indonesia
- Height: 1.65 m (5 ft 5 in)
- Position: Winger

Team information
- Current team: Persibo Bojonegoro
- Number: 78

Youth career
- 2009–2010: Persebaya U21
- 2010–2012: Persisam U21

Senior career*
Years	Team	Apps	(Gls)
2010–2014	Persisam Putra Samarinda	33	(6)
2015–2016	Persiba Balikpapan	19	(0)
2017	Persegres Gresik	9	(0)
2018–2019	Martapura	27	(6)
2020–2021	Sriwijaya	13	(1)
2022	Persela Lamongan	16	(4)
2022–2023	Persik Kediri	5	(0)
2023–2024	Persela Lamongan	16	(2)
2024–	Persibo Bojonegoro	31	(0)

International career
2013	Indonesia U23	1	(0)
- * Club domestic league appearances and goals as of 11 January 2026

Rahel Radiansyah (born 22 May 1991) is an Indonesian professional footballer who plays as a winger for Liga Nusantara club Persibo Bojonegoro.

== Club career ==
=== SSB BULOG Jatim Surabaya ===
Mulai berlatih sejak usia dini di SSB BULOG Jatim Surabaya dan ikut mengikuti pertandingan lokal dan Nasional mulai Kelompok Umur U-12.

=== Persegres Gresik ===
He was signed for Persegres Gresik to play in Liga 1 in the 2017 season. Radiansyah made his league debut on 7 May 2017 in a match against Bhayangkara at the Patriot Candrabaga Stadium, Bakasi.

=== Martapura ===
In 2018, Radiansyah signed a contract with Indonesian Liga 2 club Martapura. He made 27 league appearances and scored 6 goals for Martapura.

=== Sriwijaya ===
He was signed for Sriwijaya to play in Liga 2 in the 2020 season. This season was suspended on 27 March 2020 due to the COVID-19 pandemic. The season was abandoned and was declared void on 20 January 2021.

=== Persela Lamongan ===
In 2022, Radiansyah signed a contract with Indonesian Liga 1 club Persela Lamongan. He made his league debut on 6 January 2022 in a match against Persipura Jayapura at the Kapten I Wayan Dipta Stadium, Gianyar.

=== Persik Kediri ===
Radiansyah was signed for Persik Kediri to play in Liga 1 in the 2022–23 season. He made his league debut on 25 July 2022 in a match against Persita Tangerang at the Indomilk Arena, Tangerang.

== Honours ==
=== Club ===
Persisam Putra Samarinda U-21

- Indonesia Super League U-21 runner-up: 2012
