= Aldaier Makatindu =

Indonesian footballer

Personal information
- Full name: Aldaier Makatindu
- Date of birth: 25 May 1992 (age 34)
- Place of birth: Jakarta, Indonesia
- Height: 1.68 m (5 ft 6 in)
- Position: Forward

Youth career
- 2010–2013: Putra Samarinda U21

Senior career*
Years	Team	Apps	(Gls)
2010–2011	Perseba Bangkalan	18	(4)
2011–2014	Putra Samarinda	42	(8)
2015	Borneo	0	(0)
2015–2016	Persiba Balikpapan	0	(0)
2017	Madura	10	(1)
2017–2020	PSIS Semarang	29	(2)
2019	→ PSIM Yogyakarta (loan)	6	(0)
2021	Sulut United	2	(0)
Total		107	(15)

International career
2013–2014	Indonesia U23	5	(3)
2014	Indonesia	1	(0)
Medal record
Men's football
Representing Indonesia
Islamic Solidarity Games
Silver medal – second place	2013 Palembang	Team
- * Club domestic league appearances and goals as of 25 November 2021

Aldaier Makatindu (born 25 May 1992) is an Indonesian former footballer who plays as a forward.

== Career ==
On January 14, 2015, he signed with Borneo Samarinda.

== International goals ==
International under-23 goals

Goal	Date	Venue	Opponent	Score	Result	Competition
1	30 March 2014	Manahan Stadium, Surakarta, Indonesia	Sri Lanka U-23	1–0	5–0	Friendly
2	30 March 2014	Manahan Stadium, Surakarta, Indonesia	Sri Lanka U-23	3–0	5–0	Friendly
3	30 March 2014	Manahan Stadium, Surakarta, Indonesia	Sri Lanka U-23	4–0	5–0	Friendly

== Honours ==
=== Club ===
Persisam Putra Samarinda U-21

- Indonesia Super League U-21 runner-up: 2012

=== International ===
Indonesia U-23

- Islamic Solidarity Games silver medal: 2013

=== Individual ===
- Indonesia Super League U-21 Top Goalscorer: 2010–11, 2012
