= Loudry Setiawan =

Indonesian footballer

Personal information
- Full name: Loudry Meilana Setiawan
- Date of birth: 8 May 1991 (age 35)
- Place of birth: Gresik, Indonesia
- Height: 1.72 m (5 ft 7 1/2 in)
- Position: Midfielder

Youth career
- 2010–2012: Persisam U-21

Senior career*
Years	Team	Apps	(Gls)
2011–2016	Putra Samarinda	43	(3)
2017–2018	Gresik United	17	(0)

International career
2014	Indonesia U-23	2	(0)
- * Club domestic league appearances and goals

Loudry Meilana Setiawan (born May 8, 1991) is an Indonesian footballer who plays as a midfielder.
