= Fengky Turnando =

Indonesian footballer

Personal information
- Full name: Fengky Turnando
- Date of birth: 1 January 1991 (age 35)
- Place of birth: Balikpapan, Indonesia
- Height: 1.74 m (5 ft 9 in)
- Position: Midfielder

Senior career*
Years	Team	Apps	(Gls)
2013–2018	Persiba Balikpapan	80	(10)
- * Club domestic league appearances and goals as of 19 September 2018

Fengky Turnando (born January 1, 1991) is an Indonesian professional footballer who plays as a midfielder.
