= PSPS U-21 =

Indonesian football club

PSPS Pekanbaru U-21
- Full name: Persatuan Sepak Bola Pekanbaru dan Sekitarnya under-21
- Nickname(s): Asykar Bertuah
- Founded: 2009
- Dissolved: 2014
- Ground: Rumbai Stadium, Pekanbaru
- Capacity: 20,000

PSPS U-21, an acronym for Persatuan Sepak Bola Pekanbaru dan Sekitarnya Under-21 is an Indonesian football team based in Pekanbaru. They compete in the division of Indonesian football, Liga Indonesia. In media, the club is often referred as the tautology PSPS Pekanbaru.
