= Surajaya Stadium =

Stadium in Indonesia

Coordinates: 7°06′48″S 112°25′46″E

- Stadion Surajaya
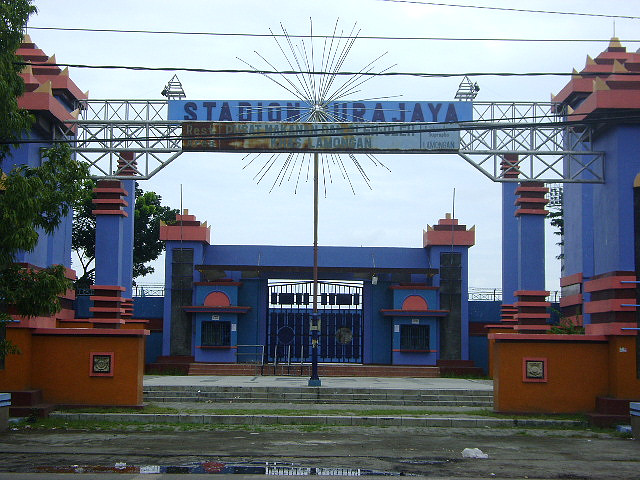
- Interactive map of Surajaya Stadium
- Full name: Surajaya Stadium
- Former names: Surajaya Stadium
- Location: Lamongan, East Java
- Owner: Lamongan Government
- Operator: Persela Lamongan
- Capacity: 12,097

Construction
- Built: 1967
- Opened: 1967
- Renovated: 2023–2024

Tenant
- Persela Lamongan

The Surajaya Stadium or Stadion Surajaya is a multi-use stadium in the village of Deket, in Lamongan, East Java, Indonesia. It is used mostly for football matches and as the home stadium for Persela Lamongan. The stadium has a capacity of 12,097 people.
