= Fahreza Agamal =

Indonesian footballer

Personal information
- Full name: Fahreza Agamal
- Date of birth: 11 March 1992 (age 34)
- Place of birth: Jakarta, Indonesia
- Height: 1.80 m (5 ft 11 in)
- Position: Defender

Youth career
- 2010–2012: Persija U21

Senior career*
Years	Team	Apps	(Gls)
2011–2013	Persija Jakarta	5	(0)
2014–2019	Martapura	102	(0)
Total		107	(0)

International career
2007–2008	Indonesia U17	12	(1)
- * Club domestic league appearances and goals

Fahreza Agamal (born 11 March 1992) is an Indonesian former footballer who plays as a defender.

== Club statistics ==
Club	Season	Super League		Premier Division		Piala Indonesia		Total	
Club	Season	Apps	Goals	Apps	Goals	Apps	Goals	Apps	Goals
Persija Jakarta	2011–12	3	0	-		-		3	0
Total		3	0	-		-		3	0
