= Aldi Al Achya =

Indonesian footballer (born 1994)

Personal information
- Full name: Aldi Al Achya
- Date of birth: 11 April 1994 (age 32)
- Place of birth: Tangerang, Indonesia
- Height: 1.65 m (5 ft 5 in)
- Positions: Winger; forward

Team information
- Current team: Matrix Putra Brother's
- Number: 10

Youth career
- 2010–2014: Persita Tangerang

Senior career*
Years	Team	Apps	(Gls)
2012–2021	Persita Tangerang	93	(29)
2016	→ Persija Jakarta (loan)	4	(0)
2022	Bekasi City	6	(0)
2023–2025	Persela Lamongan	24	(1)
2026–	Matrix Putra Brother's	4	(4)
- * Club domestic league appearances and goals as of 6 April 2026

Aldi Al Achya (born 11 April 1994) is an Indonesian footballer who plays as a winger and forward for Liga 4 club Matrix Putra Brother's.

== Club career ==
=== Persita Tangerang ===
Was born in Tangerang, Aldi started his professional career with Persita Tangerang on 2012.

==== Persija Jakarta (loan) ====
Aldi returned to the 2016 Indonesia Soccer Championship A, joining Persija Jakarta on loan from Persita Tangerang.

== Honours ==
=== Club ===
Persita Tangerang

- Liga 2 runner-up: 2019

=== Individual ===
- Indonesia Super League U-21 Top Goalscorer: 2014 (16 goals)
