= Ahmad Ihwan =

Indonesian footballer

Personal information
- Full name: Ahmad Ihwan
- Date of birth: 27 March 1993 (age 33)
- Place of birth: Malang, Indonesia
- Height: 1.72 m (5 ft 8 in)
- Position: Forward

Team information
- Current team: Persekat Tegal
- Number: 93

Youth career
- 2010–2012: Persija Jakarta

Senior career*
Years	Team	Apps	(Gls)
2011–2012	Persija Jakarta	1	(0)
2013	Persiwa Wamena	3	(0)
2013	Persekam Metro FC	4	(0)
2014–2016	PSPS Riau	22	(6)
2016	Persiba Balikpapan	0	(0)
2017	Lampung Sakti	14	(6)
2017	Cilegon United	6	(3)
2018	Lampung Sakti	9	(4)
2019	Sriwijaya	24	(10)
2020	Badak Lampung	1	(0)
2021	PSIM Yogyakarta	4	(2)
2022	PSMS Medan	5	(3)
2023–2024	Semen Padang	19	(8)
2024–2025	Persela Lamongan	1	(0)
2025	Persipal Palu	1	(0)
2026–	Persekat Tegal	9	(0)
- * Club domestic league appearances and goals as of 2 May 2026

Ahmad Ihwan (born 27 March 1993) is an Indonesian professional footballer who plays as a forward for Championship club Persekat Tegal.

== Club career ==
=== Sriwijaya ===
He was signed for Sriwijaya to play in Liga 2 in the 2019 season, Ihwan scored 10 goals in 24 appearances.

=== Badak Lampung ===
He was signed for Badak Lampung to play in the Liga 2 in the 2020 season. This season was suspended on 27 March 2020 due to the COVID-19 pandemic. The season was abandoned and was declared void on 20 January 2021.

=== PSIM Yogyakarta ===
In 2021, Ahmad Ihwan signed a contract with Indonesian Liga 2 club PSIM Yogyakarta. He made his league debut on 26 September in a 1–0 loss against PSCS Cilacap at the Manahan Stadium, Surakarta.

=== PSMS Medan ===
Ihwan was signed for PSMS Medan to play in Liga 2 in the 2022–23 season. He made his league debut on 30 August 2022 in a match against PSKC Cimahi at the Si Jalak Harupat Stadium, Soreang.

== Honours ==
Semen Padang

- Liga 2 runner-up: 2023–24
