= Rudi Setiawan =

Indonesian footballer

Personal information
- Full name: Rudi Setiawan
- Date of birth: 13 January 1993 (age 33)
- Place of birth: Jakarta, Indonesia
- Height: 1.57 m (5 ft 2 in)
- Position: Winger

Team information
- Current team: Raga Negeri
- Number: 10

Youth career
- 2004−2005: SSB Serpong
- 2005−2009: Villa 2000
- 2010−2013: Persija U-21

Senior career*
Years	Team	Apps	(Gls)
2009−2010	Villa 2000	26	(11)
2011−2016	Persija Jakarta	38	(1)
2014	→ Martapura (loan)	4	(0)
2016	Gresik United	5	(0)
2017	Persita Tangerang	3	(0)
2017–2018	PSIR Rembang	16	(1)
2021–2022	Serpong City	8	(0)
2022–	Raga Negeri	4	(1)

International career
2007−2008	Indonesia U17	12	(0)
2013	Indonesia U23	1	(0)
- * Club domestic league appearances and goals as of 30 January 2023

Rudi Setiawan (born January 13, 1993) is an Indonesian semi-professional footballer who plays as a winger for Liga 3 club Raga Negeri. He previously plays for Persija Jakarta and In the 2014 season, he was loaned to Martapura Persistence and perseverance play football deliver Rudi accomplishment, arguably very impressive for a player his age. In the football tournament Manchester United Premier Cup 2008, Rudi won three awards, namely Best Midfielder, top scorer (13 goals), and Player of the Year.

== Career ==
His first football career when he was still in SSB Serpong, and then went to SSB Villa 2000. At that time, because football is very good talent, he was finally put into the squad Villa 2000 to go to England and followed Manchester United Premier Cup 2008. As a result, there he became top scorer at the same time best players. And he started his senior career when following Selection Persija U-21 in 2010, and he managed to escape and strengthen the U-21 Persija Jakarta in Indonesia Super League U-21 at the time. In 2011, he managed to get into the squad Persija Jakarta in ISL 2012 season, but because Indonesia Super League U-21 held again, he got back to Persija U-21. In the 2014 season, he was loaned to Martapura FC.
