= Persija Jakarta U-21 =

Indonesian football club

Persija Jakarta U-20
- Full name: Persatuan Sepak Bola Indonesia Jakarta U-20
- Nicknames: Macan Muda (The Young Tigers)
- Ground: Persija Training Ground
- Head coach: Blitz Tarigan
- League: EPA ONE U-20
- 2025-26: 1st (champion)
- Website: http://persija.id/
| Home colours | Away colours |

Persija Jakarta U-20 is a team under Persija Jakarta’s youth development program. The team competes in EPA ONE U-20.

== History ==
In the 2025-2026 Super League Elite Pro Academy U-20 season, Persija Jakarta U-20 became champions after defeating Malut United U-20 by a score of 1-0, with Theodore Leeming as the goalscorer. Persija Jakarta U-20 striker Ahmad Mujadid won the top scorer trophy with his 27 goals and Furqon Alqatiri was named the best coach of the season. In that season, Persija Jakarta also honored as the Best Academy.

== Former players ==
- (Indonesia) Rizky Ramdani Lestaluhu (promotion to main teams in 2008)
- (Indonesia) Hasyim Kipuw (promotion to main teams in 2009)
- (Indonesia) Wirya Kumandra (promotion to main teams in 2010)
- (Indonesia) Sansan Fauzi Husaeni (promotion to main teams in 2010)
- (Indonesia) Rudi Setiawan (promotion to main teams in 2011)
- (Indonesia) Delton Stevano (promotion to main teams in 2011)
- (Indonesia) Fahreza Agamal (promotion to main teams in 2011)
- (Indonesia) Abdul Tommy (promotion to main teams in 2011)
- (Indonesia) Adixi Lenzivio (promotion to main teams in 2011)
