= Persita Tangerang U-21 =

Indonesian football club

Persita Tangerang U-20
- Full name: Persatuan Sepak Bola Indonesia Tangerang U-20
- Nickname: Pendekar Cisadane
- Ground: Indomilk Arena
- Coach: Ilham Jaya Kesuma
Home colours	Away colours

Persita Tangerang U-20 is an Indonesian football club based in Tangerang, Indonesia.

== Former players ==
- (Indonesia) Abdul Rahman
- (Indonesia) Maulana (promotion to main team)
- (Indonesia) Rishadi Fauzi (promotion to main team)

== Honours ==
- Indonesia Super League U-21
  - Runners-up (1): 2009
