= Persela Lamongan U-21 =

Indonesian football club

Persela Lamongan U-20
- Full name: Persatuan Sepakbola Lamongan U-20
- Nickname: The Young Dolphins
- Ground: Surajaya Stadium
- Manager: Agus Suyanto
- League: EPA U-20
- 2019: Second round, 3rd
Home colours	Away colours

Persela Lamongan U-20 is a football club based in Lamongan, Indonesia.

== Honours ==
- Indonesian Super League U-21
  - Winners (1): 2010–11
