= Arema F.C. U-21 =

Indonesian football club

Arema FC U-20
- Full name: Arema Football Club U-20
- Nickname: Ongis Licek (The Young Lions)
- Ground: Kanjuruhan Stadium
- Manager: Agus Yuwono
- League: EPA U-20
- 2019: 6th (group stage)
Home colours	Away colours

Arema FC U-20 is an Indonesian football team based in Malang, East Java. They currently competing in the Elite Pro Academy U-20.
