= Persipura Jayapura U-21 =

Association football team in Indonesia

Persipura Jayapura U-20
- Full name: Persatuan Sepakbola Indonesia Jayapura U-20
- Nickname: Mutiara Muda (The Young Pearls)
- Ground: Mandala Stadium
- League: EPA U-20
- 2019: Second round, 4th
Home colours	Away colours

Persipura Jayapura U-20 is a football club based in Jayapura, Papua, Indonesia. The main team is Persipura Jayapura.
