= Persipasi Bandung Raya U-21 =

Indonesian football club

Persipasi Bandung Raya U-20
- Full name: Persipasi Bandung Raya U-20
- Ground: Si Jalak Harupat Stadium
- Coach: Roni Remon
| Home colours | Away colours |

Persipasi Bandung Raya U-20 (previously called Pelita Bandung Raya U-20 and Pelita Jaya U-20) is an Indonesian football team located in Bandung, West Java, Indonesia.

== Notable former players ==
- (Indonesia) Wawan Febrianto

== Honours ==
- Indonesia Super League U-21
  - Winners (1): 2008–09
  - Runners-up (1): 2009–10
  - Third-place (1): 2012
