= Liga 1 U-19 =

- Founded: 2008 (as Indonesia Super League U-21); 2017 (as Liga 1 U-19)
- Folded: 2018
- Replaced by: Elite Pro Academy
- Country: Indonesia
- Confederation: AFC (Asia)
- Number of clubs: 18
- Level on pyramid: 1
- Last champions: Persib Bandung U-19 (2nd title)
- Most championships: Persib Bandung U-19; Persela Lamongan U-21 (2 titles each)
- Broadcaster(s): UseeTV (finals only); All Indonesian club channels (from regular season to semi finals)
- Website: Official website

Liga 1 U-19 is a junior-level league of participating clubs in Liga 1. From 2008 to 2014, this youth league was an under-21 league known as the Indonesia Super League U-21. From the 2017 season onwards, the competition age limit decreased from under-21 to under-19. Building and managing a complete U-19 team is one of the requirements for clubs participating in Liga 1, as regulated by the Football Association of Indonesia (PSSI). In 2019, the league was replaced by Elite Pro Academy.

== Competition format ==
Differently than the main Liga 1, this junior competition, divided into four acts, consists of two group stages and two knockout rounds, which is the semifinals and final. On the first stage, the 18 participating clubs are divided into three groups, each containing six clubs, the top two teams of each group and the two best third place will advance to the second stage. The second stage consists of two groups containing four teams in each group, the best team from each group and the best runner-up will advance to the semifinals. The winner of the semifinals will advance to the final to battle for the championship.

== Champions ==
Season	Winner	Runners-up	Third place
2008–09	Pelita Jaya U-21	Persita Tangerang U-21	Persib Bandung U-21
2009–10	Persib Bandung U-21	Pelita Jaya U-21	Persipura Jayapura U-21
2011	Persela Lamongan U-21	Semen Padang U-21	Persiwa Wamena U-21
2012	Persela Lamongan U-21	Persisam Putra Samarinda U-21	Pelita Jaya U-21
2012–13	Sriwijaya FC U-21	Mitra Kukar FC U-21	Persipura Jayapura U-21
2014	Semen Padang U-21	Sriwijaya FC U-21	Persipura Jayapura U-21
2015	Competition abandoned due to FIFA suspension		
2016	Replaced temporarily with ISC U-21		
2017	Persipura Jayapura U-19	Persib Bandung U-19	Bali United U-19
2018	Persib Bandung U-19	Persija Jakarta U-19	Barito Putera U-19

== Awards ==
Season	Best player	Top scorer	Fair play
2008–09	Dedi Kusnandar (Pelita Jaya U-21)	Aditya Putra Dewa (PSM U-21)	Persik U-21
2009–10	Munadi (Persib U-21)	Lukas Mandowen (Persipura U-21)	Pelita Jaya U-21
2011	Fandi Eko Utomo (Persela U-21)	Aldaier Makatindu (Persisam U-21)	Persisam U-21
2012	Lerby Eliandry (Persisam U-21)	Aldaier Makatindu (Persisam U-21)	Persisam U-21
2012–13	Rizky Ramadhana (Sriwijaya FC U-21)	Rizky Ramadhana (Sriwijaya FC U-21)	Sriwijaya FC U-21
2014	Nerius Alom (Semen Padang U-21)	Aldi Al Achya (Persita U-21)	Pelita Bandung Raya U-21
2015	Competition abandoned due to FIFA suspension		
2017	Todd Rivaldo Ferre (Persipura U-19)	Ghifari Vaiz Adhitya (Persela U-19)	Bali United U-19
2018	Syafril Lestaluhu (Persib U-21)	Beckham Putra (Persib U-21)	Borneo FC U-19

== See also ==
- Liga 1
- Indonesian football league system

== Notes ==
1. Indonesia Soccer Championship was a football competition that replaced the temporarily-suspended Liga Indonesia.
