= 2018 Liga 1 U-19 =

Tournament details
- Country: Indonesia
- Dates: 29 September – 26 November 2018
- Teams: 18

Final positions
- Champions: Persib U19s (1st title)
- Runners-up: Persija U19s
- Third place: Barito Putera U19s
- Fourth place: Borneo U19s

Tournament statistics
- Matches played: 106
- Goals scored: 288 (2.72 per match)
- Top goal scorer: Beckham Putra (9 goals)

Awards
- Best player: Syafril Lestaluhu

The 2018 Liga 1 U-19 season was the eighth edition of the Indonesia Junior Level League system since its introduction in 2008, the second and last since being changed from an under-21 league to under-19. From 2019, the league was contested by the under-20 teams. This season's participants were the U-19 teams of 2018 Liga 1 teams. The season began on 29 September 2018 and ended on 26 November 2018.

Persipura U19s were the defending champions after defeating Persib U19s 1–0 in last year final.

Persib U19s won the title on 26 November 2018 after defeating Persija U19s 1–0 in the final.

== Overview ==
=== Format ===
The format of this competition was the same as before, divided into four acts consist of two group rounds and two knockout rounds, which was the semifinals and final. On the first round, the teams were divided into three groups each containing six clubs, the top two teams of each group and the two best third place advanced to the second round. The difference in this round was that all groups held a home tournament. The second round consists of two groups containing four teams in each group, the best team from each group and the best runner-up advanced to the semi-finals. The winner of the semi-finals advanced to the final to battle for the championship.

=== Regulations ===
Player registration regulations were as follows:

- Teams could register a maximum of 30 players;
- Players born on or after 1 January 1999 were eligible to compete in the tournament.
- Each team was allowed to register five players born on 1 January – 31 December 1998 who must had been registered in 2017 Liga 1 U-19.

== First round ==
First round was the group stage and started on 29 September 2018. All groups play double-game round-robin home tournament. The winners and runner-ups from each group along with two best third-placed teams advance to second round.

=== Group A ===
PSMS U19s hosted the first half at Teladan Stadium. While Sriwijaya U19s hosted the second half at Athletic Stadium.

Pos	Team	Pld	W	D	L	GF	GA	GD	Pts	Qualification	PSJ	SRI	BHA	SMG	MED	TIR
1	Persija U19s	10	6	2	2	19	9	+10	20	Advance to second round	—	0–0	2–1	0–1	0–1	7–1
2	Sriwijaya U19s	10	5	3	2	18	12	+6	18	Advance to second round	1–1	—	0–1	2–4	3–3	1–0
3	Bhayangkara U19s	10	6	0	4	20	12	+8	18		1–3	2–3	—	0–1	2–0	2–1
4	PSIS U19s	10	4	2	4	13	14	−1	14		1–2	0–3	1–2	—	1–1	1–2
5	PSMS U19s	10	2	2	6	8	20	−12	8		1–2	0–3	0–6	1–2	—	0–1
6	PS TIRA U19s	10	2	1	7	9	20	−11	7		1–2	1–2	1–3	1–1	0–1	—

Source: Babak Pendahuluan Liga 1 U-19

=== Group B ===
Bali United U19s hosted the first half at Kapten I Wayan Dipta Stadium. While Persib U19s hosted the second half at Arcamanik Stadium and Siliwangi Stadium.

Pos	Team	Pld	W	D	L	GF	GA	GD	Pts	Qualification	PBY	BPT	PSB	BLU	MDU	PSL
1	Persebaya U19s	10	6	2	2	13	7	+6	20	Advance to second round	—	1–0	0–2	4–1	1–0	3–1
2	Barito Putera U19s	10	5	3	2	13	9	+4	18	Advance to second round	1–1	—	2–0	1–0	3–2	2–0
3	Persib U19s	10	5	3	2	19	9	+10	18	Advance to second round	0–1	1–1	—	2–2	2–0	3–3
4	Bali United U19s	10	4	2	4	16	13	+3	14		1–2	2–0	0–1	—	1–0	5–1
5	Madura United U19s	10	3	0	7	8	19	−11	9		1–0	1–2	0–6	1–3	—	1–0
6	Persela U19s	10	0	4	6	8	20	−12	4		0–0	1–1	0–2	1–1	1–2	—

Source: Babak Pendahuluan Liga 1 U-19

=== Group C ===
Arema U19s hosted the first half at Gajayana Stadium. While the second half were played in Moch. Soebroto Stadium and Gemilang Stadium, Magelang.

Pos	Team	Pld	W	D	L	GF	GA	GD	Pts	Qualification	PPR	PSM	BOR	MKU	ARE	PSR
1	Persipura U19s	10	7	3	0	18	2	+16	24	Advance to second round	—	2–0	1–1	2–0	1–0	4–0
2	PSM U19s	10	6	2	2	14	7	+7	20	Advance to second round	0–1	—	3–1	1–1	1–0	2–1
3	Borneo U19s	10	5	4	1	20	5	+15	19	Advance to second round	0–0	0–0	—	5–0	2–0	0–0
4	Mitra Kukar U19s	10	2	3	5	10	18	−8	9		0–2	1–2	1–3	—	3–3	2–0
5	Arema U19s	10	1	4	5	9	15	−6	7		0–0	0–3	0–1	0–0	—	3–1
6	Perseru U19s	10	0	2	8	6	30	−24	2		1–5	0–2	0–7	0–2	3–3	—

Source: Babak Pendahuluan Liga 1 U-19

=== Ranking of third-placed teams ===
Pos	Grp	Team	Pld	W	D	L	GF	GA	GD	Pts	Qualification
1	C	Borneo U19s	10	5	4	1	20	5	+15	19	Advance to second round
2	B	Persib U19s	10	5	3	2	19	9	+10	18	Advance to second round
3	A	Bhayangkara U19s	10	6	0	4	20	12	+8	18	

Source: Babak Pendahuluan Liga 1 U-19

== Second round ==
Second round was the group stage and was played on 7–11 November 2018. All groups was played on a single-game round-robin home tournament. The winners and runner-ups from each group advance to semi-finals. The draw for the group was held on 31 October 2018.

=== Group 1 ===
This group was played at Moch. Soebroto Stadium and Gemilang Stadium, Magelang.

Pos	Team	Pld	W	D	L	GF	GA	GD	Pts	Qualification
1	Persib U19s	3	3	0	0	8	1	+7	9	Advance to semi-finals
2	Persija U19s	3	1	1	1	4	6	−2	4	Advance to semi-finals
3	PSM U19s	3	1	0	2	2	5	−3	3	
4	Persebaya U19s	3	0	1	2	2	4	−2	1	

Source: Babak Perempat Final Liga 1 U-19

7 November 2018
Persija U19s	0–4	Persib U19s	Moch. Soebroto Stadium, Magelang
Persebaya U19s	0–1	PSM U19s	Gemilang Stadium, Magelang
9 November 2018
Persib U19s	2–1	Persebaya U19s	Moch. Soebroto Stadium, Magelang
PSM U19s	1–3	Persija U19s	Gemilang Stadium, Magelang
11 November 2018
Persija U19s	1–1	Persebaya U19s	Moch. Soebroto Stadium, Magelang
PSM U19s	0–2	Persib U19s	Gemilang Stadium, Magelang

=== Group 2 ===
This group was played at May 17th Stadium, Banjarmasin and Demang Lehman Stadium, Martapura.

Pos	Team	Pld	W	D	L	GF	GA	GD	Pts	Qualification
1	Barito Putera U19s	3	2	0	1	5	3	+2	6	Advance to semi-finals
2	Borneo U19s	3	2	0	1	5	4	+1	6	Advance to semi-finals
3	Persipura U19s	3	1	1	1	4	4	0	4	
4	Sriwijaya U19s	3	0	1	2	5	8	−3	1	

Source: Babak Perempat Final Liga 1 U-19

7 November 2018
Persipura U19s	0–2	Borneo U19s	May 17th Stadium, Banjarmasin
Barito Putera U19s	3–1	Sriwijaya U19s	May 17th Stadium, Banjarmasin
9 November 2018
Borneo U19s	0–2	Barito Putera U19s	May 17th Stadium, Banjarmasin
Sriwijaya U19s	2–2	Persipura U19s	May 17th Stadium, Banjarmasin
11 November 2018
Persipura U19s	2–0	Barito Putera U19s	May 17th Stadium, Banjarmasin
Sriwijaya U19s	2–3	Borneo U19s	Demang Lehman Stadium, Martapura

== Knockout round ==
=== Bracket ===
Semi-finals
15 November – Cikarang
Persib U19s	3
Borneo U19s	1
16 November – Cikarang
Barito Putera U19s	2 (5)
Persija U19s (pen.)	2 (6)

Final
26 November – Gianyar
Persib U19s	1
Persija U19s	0
Third place
26 November – Gianyar
Borneo U19s	1
Barito Putera U19s	2

=== Semi-finals ===
15 November 2018
Persib U19s	3–1	Borneo U19s	Wibawa Mukti Stadium, Cikarang
16 November 2018
Barito Putera U19s	2–2 (5–6 p)	Persija U19s	Wibawa Mukti Stadium, Cikarang

=== Third Place ===
26 November 2018
Borneo U19s	1–2	Barito Putera U19s	Kapten I Wayan Dipta Stadium, Gianyar

=== Final ===
26 November 2018
Persib U19s	1–0	Persija U19s	Kapten I Wayan Dipta Stadium, Gianyar

== Top goalscorers ==
Rank	Player	Team	Goals
1	Beckham Putra	Persib U19s	9
2	Ilham Qolba Rizky Wiguna	Persib U19s	8
3	Gunansar Mandowen	Persipura U19s	7
4	Ulul Azmi	Borneo U19s	6
4	Galih Apriliana	Persija U19s	6
4	Rizky Ridho	Persebaya U19s	6

== See also ==
- 2018 Liga 1
- 2018 Liga 2
- 2018 Liga 3
- 2018–19 Piala Indonesia
