= 2017 Liga 1 U-19 =

Tournament details
- Country: Indonesia
- Dates: 8 July – 7 November 2017
- Teams: 18

Final positions
- Champions: Persipura U19s (1st title)
- Runner-up: Persib U19s
- Third place: Bali United U19s
- Fourth place: Borneo U19s

Tournament statistics
- Matches played: 106
- Goals scored: 245 (2.31 per match)
- Top goal scorer(s): Ghifari Vaiz Adhitya (12 goals)

Awards
- Best player: Todd Rivaldo Ferre

The 2017 Liga 1 U-19 season was the seventh edition of the Indonesia Junior Level League system since its introduction in 2008, and the first since being changed from an under-21 league to under-19. This season's participants were the U-19 teams of 2017 Liga 1 teams. The season began on 8 July 2017 and ended on 8 November 2017.

Winner of the 2014 Indonesia Super League U-21 Semen Padang U21s were the defending champions, as the 2015 Indonesia Super League U-21 wasn't held due to FIFA suspension while the 2016 Indonesia Soccer Championship U-21 was not counted as an official youth league. Persipura U19s won the title on 7 November 2017 after defeating Persib U19s 1–0 in the final.

== Format ==
The format of this competition was same as 2016 Indonesia Soccer Championship U-21, divided into four acts consist of two group stages and two knockout rounds, which is the semifinals and final. On the first stage, the teams were divided into three groups each containing six clubs, the top two teams of each group and the two best third place advanced to the second stage. The second stage consists of two groups containing four teams in each group, the best team from each group and the best runner-up advanced to the semifinals. The winner of the semifinals advanced to the final to battle for the championship.

Only players born on or after 1 January 1998 were eligible to compete in the tournament.

== First round ==
First round was the group stage and started on 8 July 2017. All groups played home and away round-robin tournament, with the exception of Group 3 which will play home tournament round-robin.

Key to colours in group tables
Top two of each group and the best third places teams advances to the second stage

=== Group 1 ===
Pos	Team	Pld	W	D	L	GF	GA	GD	Pts	Qualification	PSB	BHA	SPD	PSJ	TNI	SFC
1	Persib U19s	10	8	1	1	15	7	+8	25	Advance to second round	—	2–1	2–0	2–1	1–0	2–1
2	Bhayangkara U19s	10	4	4	2	13	11	+2	16	Advance to second round	1–1	—	1–0	1–2	1–1	1–0
3	Semen Padang U19s	10	4	1	5	9	11	−2	13		0–1	2–3	—	1–0	1–0	1–0
4	Persija U19s	10	3	3	4	10	11	−1	12		0–1	1–2	2–1	—	2–1	1–1
5	PS TNI U19s	10	2	4	4	10	9	+1	10		2–1	1–1	1–1	0–0	—	4–0
6	Sriwijaya U19s	10	1	3	6	7	15	−8	6		1–2	1–1	1–2	1–1	1–0	—

Source: Liga 1 U-19

=== Group 2 ===
Pos	Team	Pld	W	D	L	GF	GA	GD	Pts	Qualification	BLU	BPT	PSL	PGU	ARE	MDU
1	Bali United U19s	10	5	5	0	11	5	+6	20	Advance to second round	—	1–1	2–1	1–0	1–1	2–0
2	Barito Putera U19s	10	5	3	2	12	8	+4	18	Advance to second round	0–1	—	2–0	0–0	1–0	1–0
3	Persela U19s	10	5	1	4	15	9	+6	16	Advance to second round	1–2	4–1	—	1–0	2–0	3–0
4	Persegres GU U19s	10	2	5	3	4	5	−1	11		0–0	0–1	1–1	—	1–0	2–1
5	Arema U19s	10	1	5	4	6	12	−6	8		0–0	1–4	1–0	0–0	—	2–2
6	Madura United U19s	10	0	5	5	6	15	−9	5		1–1	1–1	0–2	0–0	1–1	—

Source: Liga 1 U-19

=== Group 3 ===
Pos	Team	Pld	W	D	L	GF	GA	GD	Pts	Qualification	BOR	PPR	PSR	MKU	PBA	PSM
1	Borneo U19s	10	6	3	1	15	7	+8	21	Advance to second round	—	1–0	2–1	1–1	3–0	1–1
2	Persipura U19s	10	4	4	2	12	6	+6	16	Advance to second round	0–1	—	1–1	2–1	0–0	1–1
3	Perseru U19s	10	4	2	4	15	13	+2	14	Advance to second round	2–1	0–2	—	2–1	0–0	7–2
4	Mitra Kukar U19s	10	3	3	4	12	13	−1	12		0–1	0–3	1–0	—	0–0	1–1
5	Persiba U19s	10	2	4	4	10	13	−3	10		1–3	0–0	3–0	1–3	—	0–3
6	PSM U19s	10	1	4	5	13	25	−12	7		1–1	1–3	0–2	2–4	1–5	—

Source: Liga 1 U-19

=== Ranking of third-placed teams ===
Pos	Grp	Team	Pld	W	D	L	GF	GA	GD	Pts	Qualification
1	2	Persela U19s	10	5	1	4	15	9	+6	16	Advance to second round
2	3	Perseru U19s	10	4	2	4	15	13	+2	14	Advance to second round
3	1	Semen Padang U19s	10	4	1	5	9	11	−2	13	

Source: Liga 1 U-19^{[usurped]}

== Second round ==
The second round was held on 18-25 October 2017. The draw was held on 11 October 2017. All groups played home tournament round-robin.

=== Group X ===
Five matches was held in Kapten I Wayan Dipta Stadium, Gianyar Regency, Bali and one match was held in Kompyang Sujana Stadium, Denpasar, Bali.

Pos	Team	Pld	W	D	L	GF	GA	GD	Pts	Qualification
1	Bali United U19s	3	2	1	0	9	6	+3	7	Advance to semi-finals
2	Borneo U19s	3	1	1	1	6	5	+1	4	Advance to semi-finals
3	Persela U19s	3	0	2	1	6	8	−2	2	
4	Bhayangkara U19s	3	0	2	1	4	6	−2	2	

Source: Liga 1 U-19^{[usurped]}

18 October 2017
Bali United U19s	4–2	Persela U19s	Kapten I Wayan Dipta Stadium, Gianyar Regency
18 October 2017
Borneo U19s	2–0	Bhayangkara U19s	Kapten I Wayan Dipta Stadium, Gianyar Regency
21 October 2017
Persela U19s	2–2	Borneo U19s	Kapten I Wayan Dipta Stadium, Gianyar Regency
21 October 2017
Bhayangkara U19s	2–2	Bali United U19s	Kapten I Wayan Dipta Stadium, Gianyar Regency
24 October 2017
Bhayangkara U19s	2–2	Persela U19s	Kompyang Sujana Stadium, Denpasar
24 October 2017
Bali United U19s	3–2	Borneo U19s	Kapten I Wayan Dipta Stadium, Gianyar Regency

=== Group Y ===
Three matches was held in Arcamanik Stadium, Bandung, West Java, two matches was held in Siliwangi Stadium, Bandung, West Java, and one match was held in Gelora Bandung Lautan Api Stadium, Bandung, West Java.

Pos	Team	Pld	W	D	L	GF	GA	GD	Pts	Qualification
1	Persib U19s	3	2	1	0	6	2	+4	7	Advance to semi-finals
2	Persipura U19s	3	1	1	1	4	4	0	4	Advance to semi-finals
3	Barito Putera U19s	3	1	0	2	3	3	0	3	
4	Perseru U19s	3	1	0	2	2	6	−4	3	

Source: Liga 1 U-19^{[usurped]}

19 October 2017
Persib U19s	2–0	Perseru U19s	Siliwangi Stadium, Bandung
19 October 2017
Persipura U19s	1–0	Barito Putera U19s	Siliwangi Stadium, Bandung
22 October 2017
Perseru U19s	2–1	Persipura U19s	Arcamanik Stadium, Bandung
22 October 2017
Barito Putera U19s	0–2	Persib U19s	Arcamanik Stadium, Bandung
25 October 2017
Barito Putera U19s	3–0	Perseru U19s	Gelora Bandung Lautan Api Stadium, Bandung
25 October 2017
Persib U19s	2–2	Persipura U19s	Arcamanik Stadium, Bandung

== Knockout round ==
Semi-finals
4 November – Bekasi
Bali United U19s	2
Persipura U19s	3
4 November – Bekasi
Persib U19s	1
Borneo U19s	0

Final
7 November – Bekasi
Persipura U19s	1
Persib U19s	0
Third place
7 November – Bekasi
Bali United U19s	2
Borneo U19s	0

=== Semi-finals ===
4 November 2017
Bali United U19s	2–3	Persipura U19s	Wibawa Mukti Stadium, Bekasi
4 November 2017
Persib U19s	1–0	Borneo U19s	Wibawa Mukti Stadium, Bekasi

=== Third Place ===
7 November 2017
Bali United U19s	2–0	Borneo U19s	Wibawa Mukti Stadium, Bekasi

=== Final ===
7 November 2017
Persipura U19s	1–0	Persib U19s	Wibawa Mukti Stadium, Bekasi

== See also ==
- 2017 Liga 1
- 2017 Liga 2
- 2017 Liga 3
- 2017 Indonesia President's Cup
- 2017 Soeratin Cup
