= 2024–25 EPA Liga 1 U-18 =

EPA Liga 1 U-18
- Season: 2024–25
- Dates: 28 September 2024 – 22 February 2025
- Champions: PSM U18s; 1st EPA Liga 1 U18 title
- Matches: 208
- Goals: 552 (2.65 per match)
- Best player: Muhammad Fahrul (PSM U18s)
- Top goalscorer: Dika Adi Nurdiansyah (13 goals)
- Total attendance: 6,129
- Average attendance: 29

The 2024–25 EPA Liga 1 U-18 will be the fifth edition of the Elite Pro Academy since its introduction in 2019. The season started on 28 September 2024 and will end on 22 February 2025. The entire match was played only until the 80th minute.

PSS U18s were the defending champions after defeating Borneo Samarinda U18s 2–1 in the final previous season.

PSM U18s became champions after defeating Persija U18s on penalties 4-2 in the final.

== Teams ==
=== Locations and stadiums ===
18 teams will compete in the league – split into three groups of six teams.

Locations of non-Java and Madura-based 2024–25 EPA Liga 1 U-20 teams
Red: Group A; Yellow: Group B; Blue: Group C
Locations of Java and Madura-based 2024–25 EPA Liga 1 U-20 teams
Red: Group A; Yellow: Group B; Blue: Group C

Team	Location	Stadium	Capacity
Arema U18s	Malang	ARG Soccer Field	0
Bali United U18s	Gianyar	Bali United Training Center	TBA
Bali United U18s	Gianyar	Ngurah Rai Stadium, at Denpasar	12,000
Barito Putera U18s	Banjarmasin	Green Yakin Soccer Field, at Banjar	0
Borneo Samarinda U18s	Samarinda	Borneo FC Training Centre	0
Dewa United U18s	South Tangerang	Persita Training Ground, at Tangerang	0
Dewa United U18s	South Tangerang	JSI Resort, at Bogor	0
Madura United U18s	Pamekasan	Madura United Training Ground	TBA
Malut United U18s	Sofifi	Marimoi Stadium, at Tidore	TBA
Persebaya U18s	Surabaya	ABC Field of GBT Stadium	0
Persib U18s	Bandung	Arcamanik Stadium	15,000
Persib U18s	Bandung	Sidolig Stadium	5,000
Persib U18s	Bandung	Siliwangi Stadium	25,000
Persija U18s	Jakarta	Persija Training Ground, at Depok	0
Persik U18s	Kediri	Kediri Soccer Field	0
Persis U18s	Surakarta	Surakarta Mini Stadium	TBA
Persis U18s	Surakarta	Banyuanyar Field	TBA
Persis U18s	Surakarta	Sriwedari Stadium	12,000
Persita U16s	Tangerang	Persita Training Ground	0
Persita U16s	Tangerang	Pagedangan Mini Stadium	TBA
PSBS U18s	Biak Numfor	Watubelah Stadium, at Cirebon	16,000
PSIS U18s	Semarang	Wisesa PSIS Training Ground, at Demak	0
PSM U18s	Makassar	Bosowa Sport Center	0
PSS U18s	Sleman	PSS Training Ground	0
Semen Padang U18s	Padang	ASIOP Stadium, at Jakarta	2,000
Semen Padang U18s	Padang	Cibinong Mini Stadium, at Bogor	15,000

=== Personnel and kits ===
Note: Flags indicate national team as has been defined under FIFA eligibility rules. Players and coaches may hold more than one non-FIFA nationality.

Team	Head coach	Kit manufacturer	Main kit sponsor	Other kit sponsor(s)
Arema U18s	(Indonesia) Doni Suherman	(Indonesia) Etams	None	List: Front: None; Back: None; Sleeves: None; Shorts: None
Bali United U18s	(Indonesia) I Gde Mahatma Dharma	(Indonesia) SPECS	Indomie	List: Front: None; Back: None; Sleeves: None; Shorts: None
Barito Putera U18s	(Indonesia) Ilham Romadhona	(Indonesia) H^{1}	Hasnur Group	List: Front: None; Back: None; Sleeves: None; Shorts: None
Borneo Samarinda U18s	(Indonesia) Moch. Fakhrudin	(Indonesia) SPECS	Ansaf	List: Front: Pupuk Kaltim; Back: PStore; Sleeves: Ghani Raya Mandiri; Shorts: None
Dewa United U18s	(Indonesia) Mohammad Firdaus	(Indonesia) DRX	None	List: Front: None; Back: None; Sleeves: None; Shorts: None
Madura United U18s	(Indonesia) Rakhmad Basuki	(Indonesia) DRX	None	List: Front: None; Back: None; Sleeves: None; Shorts: None
Malut United U18s	(Indonesia) Alfian M. Rivai	(Indonesia) SPECS	Mineral Trobos	List: Front: PT Gebe Sinar Perkasa; Back: PT Gebe Prima Mandiri; Sleeves: Lumbung Ikan Maluku; Shorts: None
Persebaya U18s	(Indonesia) Mat Halil	(Indonesia) AZA	Kapal Api	List: Front: None; Back: None; Sleeves: None; Shorts: None
Persib U18s	(Indonesia) Asep Rahmat Saputra	(Indonesia) Sportama	Indofood	List: Front: None; Back: None; Sleeves: None; Shorts: None
Persija U18s	(Indonesia) Blitz Tarigan	(Indonesia) Juaraga	None	List: Front: None; Back: None; Sleeves: None; Shorts: None
Persik U18s	(Indonesia) Astino Derifiansyah	(Indonesia) DRX	Athletes For Good	List: Front: Le Minerale; Back: None; Sleeves: None; Shorts: None
Persis U18s	(Indonesia) Imam Rohmawan	(Indonesia) Amrta	Free Fire	List: Front: None; Back: None; Sleeves: None; Shorts: None
Persita U18s	(Indonesia) Suwarto	(Indonesia) 1953^{1}	Indomilk	List: Front: Moya, Matrix Broadband, Aetra Tangerang; Back: Indomie; Sleeves: Palang Merah Indonesia, KABOOM Creative; Shorts: None
PSBS U18s	(Indonesia) Suprianto	(Indonesia) Kasumasa^{1}	NusaTuna	List: Front: PT Freeport Indonesia, Bank Papua, Ulam Laut; Back: Kopi ABC; Sleeves: None; Shorts: None
PSIS U18s	(Indonesia) Edi Hafid	(Indonesia) DRX	None	List: Front: None; Back: None; Sleeves: None; Shorts: None
PSM U18s	(Indonesia) Muh Irfan Rahman	(Indonesia) DRX	Bosowa Corp	List: Front: None; Back: None; Sleeves: None; Shorts: None
PSS U18s	(Indonesia) Aanang Hadisaputra	(Indonesia) DRX	Amman Mineral	List: Front: Indomie, MedcoEnergi, Ithaca Resources, Le Minerale; Back: None; Sleeves: None; Shorts: None
Semen Padang U18s	(Indonesia) Gilang Ramadhan	(Indonesia) SPFC Apparel^{1}	Semen Padang	List: Front: ASIOP; Back: None; Sleeves: None; Shorts: None

Notes:

1. Apparel made by club.

== First round ==
For the first round, 18 teams split into three group of six. Each group playing home and away double-game round-robin matches. The winners and runner-ups from each group along with two best third-placed teams advanced to second round

=== Group A ===
Pos	Team	Pld	W	D	L	GF	GA	GD	Pts	Qualification
1	Semen Padang U18s	20	11	7	2	38	12	+26	40	Advance to Second round
2	Dewa United U18s	20	11	5	4	30	17	+13	38	Advance to Second round
3	Persija U18s	20	10	7	3	28	15	+13	37	Advance to Second round
4	Barito Putera U18s	20	8	2	10	24	22	+2	26	
5	Persita U18s	20	7	3	10	17	19	−2	24	
6	PSBS U18s	20	0	2	18	8	60	−52	2	

Source: 2024–25 EPA Liga 1 U-18
Rules for classification: 1) Points; 2) Head-to-head points; 3) Head-to-head goal difference; 4) Head-to-head goals scored; 5) Goal difference; 6) Goals scored; 7) Fair-play points; 8) Draw.

Home \ Away	SMP	DWU	PSJ	BAR	PTR	BIK	SMP	DWU	PSJ	BAR	PTR	BIK
Semen Padang U18s		2–2	5–0	1–1	1–2	5–0		2–0	0–0	3–2	0–0	8–0
Dewa United U18s	0–0		0–0	2–0	1–0	4–0	2–2		2–2	3–2	1–0	4–1
Persija U18s	1–0	2–0		0–1	1–1	1–0	0–1	2–1		2–0	2–0	5–1
Barito Putera U18s	0–1	1–0	1–1		1–0	5–0	0–1	0–1	0–1		0–3	2–1
Persita U18s	0–2	0–1	0–1	0–2		1–0	0–1	0–3	1–1	2–0		3–1
PSBS U18s	1–1	0–1	0–5	0–3	0–1		1–2	1–2	1–1	0–3	0–3	

Source: 2024–25 EPA Liga 1 U-18
Legend: Blue = home team win; Yellow = draw; Red = away team win.
For upcoming matches, an "a" indicates there is an article about the rivalry between the two participants.

=== Group B ===
Pos	Team	Pld	W	D	L	GF	GA	GD	Pts	Qualification
1	Persib U18s	20	15	1	4	35	18	+17	46	Advance to Second round
2	PSS U18s	20	11	4	5	32	28	+4	37	Advance to Second round
3	Persis U18s	20	10	4	6	31	21	+10	34	
4	Borneo Samarinda U18s	20	10	2	8	38	25	+13	32	
5	PSIS U18s	20	4	3	13	22	40	−18	15	
6	Arema U18s	20	1	4	15	14	40	−26	7	

Source: 2024–25 EPA Liga 1 U-18
Rules for classification: 1) Points; 2) Head-to-head points; 3) Head-to-head goal difference; 4) Head-to-head goals scored; 5) Goal difference; 6) Goals scored; 7) Fair-play points; 8) Draw.

Home \ Away	PSB	PSS	PSO	BOR	SMG	AFC	PSB	PSS	PSO	BOR	SMG	AFC
Persib U18s		2–0	2–1	0–2	3–1	2–0		5–1	1–0	2–0	2–1	1–0
PSS U18s	2–2		1–0	2–1	0–0	3–2	0–1		2–1	4–3	3–0	1–0
Persis U18s	3–0	2–1		4–2	2–1	2–1	2–1	1–1		2–0	1–2	1–1
Borneo Samarinda U18s	2–0	0–1	1–1		3–1	4–0	0–1	3–0	1–0		4–0	3–1
PSIS U18s	1–3	1–2	1–2	3–2		1–0	1–2	2–2	1–2	1–4		1–1
Arema U18s	1–2	1–4	0–3	1–2	1–0		0–3	1–2	1–1	1–1	1–3	

Source: 2024–25 EPA Liga 1 U-18
Legend: Blue = home team win; Yellow = draw; Red = away team win.
For upcoming matches, an "a" indicates there is an article about the rivalry between the two participants.

=== Group C ===
Pos	Team	Pld	W	D	L	GF	GA	GD	Pts	Qualification
1	PSM U18s	20	11	5	4	33	21	+12	38	Advance to Second round
2	Persik U18s	20	10	7	3	43	26	+17	37	Advance to Second round
3	Bali United U18s	20	10	4	6	37	19	+18	34	Advance to Second round
4	Malut United U18s	20	8	5	7	22	20	+2	29	
5	Persebaya U18s	20	7	5	8	27	25	+2	26	
6	Madura United U18s	20	0	2	18	9	60	−51	2	

Source: 2024–25 EPA Liga 1 U-18
Rules for classification: 1) Points; 2) Head-to-head points; 3) Head-to-head goal difference; 4) Head-to-head goals scored; 5) Goal difference; 6) Goals scored; 7) Fair-play points; 8) Draw.

Home \ Away	PSM	KDR	BLI	MLT	PBY	MDR	PSM	KDR	BLI	MLT	PBY	MDR
PSM U18s		1–1	2–0	1–0	0–0	2–1		2–2	3–2	0–2	0–1	3–1
Persik U18s	3–1		3–1	6–0	4–2	1–0	1–1		2–2	3–1	1–1	3–3
Bali United U18s	0–1	2–2		2–0	4–1	5–0	0–1	1–0		0–0	1–1	7–0
Malut United U18s	1–1	3–1	1–0		1–0	1–0	1–2	3–0	0–1		1–1	2–0
Persebaya U18s	4–0	1–2	0–1	1–0		5–0	0–4	1–2	1–3	0–0		3–1
Madura United U18s	1–4	0–3	1–3	1–1	0–1		0–4	0–3	0–2	0–4	0–3	

Source: 2024–25 EPA Liga 1 U-18
Legend: Blue = home team win; Yellow = draw; Red = away team win.
For upcoming matches, an "a" indicates there is an article about the rivalry between the two participants.

=== Ranking of third-placed teams ===
Pos	Grp	Team	Pld	W	D	L	GF	GA	GD	Pts	Qualification
1	A	Persija U18s	20	10	7	3	28	15	+13	37	Advance to the second round
2	C	Bali United U18s	20	10	4	6	37	19	+18	34	Advance to the second round
3	B	Persis U18s	20	10	4	6	31	21	+10	34	

Source: 2024–25 EPA Liga 1 U-18
Rules for classification: 1) Points; 2) Goal difference; 3) Goals scored; 4) Fair-play points; 5) Draw.

== Second round ==
The top eight teams from the first round will be divided into 2 groups of four teams to play home-and-away round-robin matches. The winners and runner-ups from each group advance to semi-finals.

=== Group X ===
Pos	Team	Pld	W	D	L	GF	GA	GD	Pts	Qualification	PSM	SMP	PSS	BLI
1	PSM U18s	6	4	1	1	8	6	+2	13	Advance to the semi-finals		2–0	1–0	0–0
2	Semen Padang U18s	6	3	0	3	9	8	+1	9	Advance to the semi-finals	4–1		2–0	2–1
3	PSS U18s	6	2	1	3	6	8	−2	7		1–2	2–1		2–1
4	Bali United U18s	6	1	2	3	6	7	−1	5		1–2	2–0	1–1	

Source: 2024–25 EPA Liga 1 U-18
Legend: Blue = home team win; Yellow = draw; Red = away team win.
Rules for classification: 1) Points; 2) Head-to-head points; 3) Head-to-head goal difference; 4) Head-to-head goals scored; 5) Goal difference; 6) Goals scored; 7) Fair-play points; 8) Draw.

=== Group Y ===
Pos	Team	Pld	W	D	L	GF	GA	GD	Pts	Qualification	PSJ	KDR	DWU	PSB
1	Persija U18s	6	2	4	0	7	5	+2	10 (Note: Head-to-head points: Persija: 4; Persik:1.)	Advance to the semi-finals		2–1	1–1	1–1
2	Persik U18s	6	3	1	2	11	8	+3	10	Advance to the semi-finals	1–1		3–1	2–3
3	Dewa United U18s	6	1	3	2	5	7	−2	6		1–1	1–2		1–0
4	Persib U18s	6	1	2	3	4	7	−3	5		0–1	0–2	0–0	

Source: 2024–25 EPA Liga 1 U-20
Legend: Blue = home team win; Yellow = draw; Red = away team win.
Rules for classification: 1) Points; 2) Head-to-head points; 3) Head-to-head goal difference; 4) Head-to-head goals scored; 5) Goal difference; 6) Goals scored; 7) Fair-play points; 8) Draw.

== Knockout round ==
=== Bracket ===
Semi-finals
19 February 2025
PSM U18s	3
Persik U18s	1
19 February 2025
Persija U18s	1
Semen Padang U18s	0

Final
22 February 2025
PSM U18s (p)	0 (4)
Persija U18s	0 (2)
Third place play-off
21 February 2025
Persik U18s	0
Semen Padang U18s	1

=== Semi-finals ===
19 February 2025
09:30 UTC +7

PSM U18s	3–1	Persik U18s
Andi Mukhram 23'; Sigit 41'; Dimas 70'	Report	Rafa Irsyad 8'

Patriot Candrabaga Stadium, Bekasi
Attendance: -
Referee: Asep Erwansyah

19 February 2025
09:30 UTC +7

Persija U18s	1–0	Semen Padang U18s
Andi Muhammad 65'	Report

MJCC Stadium, Bekasi
Attendance: -
Referee: Ari Santoso

=== Third place play-off ===
21 February 2025
09:30 UTC +7

Persik U18s	0–1	Semen Padang U18s
	Report	Tezar 54'

MJCC Stadium, Bekasi
Attendance: -
Referee: Untung Santoso

=== Final ===
22 February 2025
09:30 UTC +7

PSM U18s	1–1	Persija U18s
Kaka 49'	Report	Andi Muhammad 28'
Penalties
Daffa (penalty scored); Syahrin (penalty scored); Ahmad Ilham (penalty missed); Sigit (penalty scored); Achmad (penalty scored)	4–2	(penalty scored) Raditya; (penalty missed) Rafa Abdurahman; (penalty scored) Zidan; (penalty missed) Gede Agung

Patriot Candrabaga Stadium, Bekasi
Attendance: -
Referee: Rihul Munandar

== Season statistics ==
=== Top Goalscorers ===
Rank	Player	Team	Goals
1	(Indonesia) Dika Adi Nurdiansyah	Borneo Samarinda U18s	13
2	(Indonesia) Fathir Fadhillah	Semen Padang U18s	12
3	(Indonesia) Jay Amru Ghoni	Persebaya U18s	10
3	(Indonesia) Enriyan Dwi Fahri	Semen Padang U18s	10
5	(Indonesia) Satria Rizki Putra	Persik Kediri U18s	8

== Awards ==
Best Player: Muhammad Fahrul (PSM U18s)

Top Goalscorer: Dika Adi Nurdiansyah (13 goals) (Borneo Samarinda U18s)

Best Coach: Blitz Tarigan (Persija U18s)

Fair Play Team: Persik U18s

Third place: Semen padang U18s

Runner-up: Persija U18s

Champions: PSM U18s

== See also ==
- 2024–25 EPA Liga 1 U-20
- 2024–25 EPA Liga 1 U-16
- Elite Pro Academy
