= 2024–25 EPA Liga 1 U-20 =

EPA Liga 1 U-20
- Season: 2024–25
- Dates: 28 September 2024 – 22 February 2025
- Champions: Persita U20s; 1st EPA Liga 1 U20 title 1st Indonesia Junior Level League title
- Matches: 208
- Goals: 624 (3 per match)
- Best player: Evan Ajid (Persita U20s)
- Top goalscorer: Raihan Utama (18 goals)
- Total attendance: 7,748
- Average attendance: 37

The 2024–25 EPA Liga 1 U-20 will be the 11th edition of the Indonesia Junior Level League system since its introduction in 2008 and the third of the Elite Pro Academy since being changed from an under-19 to under-20. The season started on 28 September 2024 and will end on 22 February 2025.

Persis U20s were the defending champions after defeating Persita U20s 3–1 in the final previous season.

Persita U20s returned to the final for the second time in a row and faced Dewa United U20s in the final and won 4–3 on penalties.

== Teams ==
=== Locations and stadiums ===
18 teams will compete in the league – split into three groups of six teams.

Locations of non-Java and Madura-based 2024–25 EPA Liga 1 U-20 teams
Red: Group A; Yellow: Group B; Blue: Group C
Locations of Java and Madura-based 2024–25 EPA Liga 1 U-20 teams
Red: Group A; Yellow: Group B; Blue: Group C

Team	Location	Stadium	Capacity
Arema U20s	Malang	ARG Soccer Field	0
Bali United U20s	Gianyar	Bali United Training Center	TBA
Bali United U20s	Gianyar	Ngurah Rai Stadium, at Denpasar	12,000
Barito Putera U20s	Banjarmasin	Green Yakin Soccer Field, at Banjar	0
Borneo Samarinda U20s	Samarinda	Borneo FC Training Centre	0
Dewa United U20s	South Tangerang	Persita Training Ground, at Tangerang	0
Dewa United U20s	South Tangerang	JSI Resort, at Bogor	0
Madura United U20s	Pamekasan	Madura United Training Ground	TBA
Malut United U20s	Sofifi	Marimoi Stadium, at Tidore	TBA
Persebaya U20s	Surabaya	ABC Field of GBT Stadium	0
Persib U20s	Bandung	Arcamanik Stadium	15,000
Persib U20s	Bandung	Sidolig Stadium	5,000
Persib U20s	Bandung	Siliwangi Stadium	25,000
Persija U20s	Jakarta	Persija Training Ground, at Depok	0
Persik U20s	Kediri	Kediri Soccer Field	0
Persis U20s	Surakarta	Surakarta Mini Stadium	TBA
Persis U20s	Surakarta	Banyuanyar Field	TBA
Persis U20s	Surakarta	Sriwedari Stadium	12,000
Persita U16s	Tangerang	Persita Training Ground	0
Persita U16s	Tangerang	Pagedangan Mini Stadium	TBA
PSBS U20s	Biak Numfor	Watubelah Stadium, at Cirebon	16,000
PSIS U20s	Semarang	Wisesa PSIS Training Ground, at Demak	0
PSM U20s	Makassar	Bosowa Sport Center	0
PSS U20s	Sleman	PSS Training Ground	0
Semen Padang U20s	Padang	ASIOP Stadium, at Jakarta	2,000
Semen Padang U20s	Padang	Cibinong Mini Stadium, at Bogor	15,000

=== Personnel and kits ===
Note: Flags indicate national team as has been defined under FIFA eligibility rules. Players and coaches may hold more than one non-FIFA nationality.

Team	Head coach	Kit manufacturer	Main kit sponsor	Other kit sponsor(s)
Arema U20s	(Indonesia) Hanafi	(Indonesia) Etams	None	List: Front: None; Back: None; Sleeves: None; Shorts: None
Bali United U20s	(Indonesia) I Made Pasek Wijaya	(Indonesia) SPECS	Indomie	List: Front: None; Back: None; Sleeves: None; Shorts: None
Barito Putera U20s	(Indonesia) Yunan Helmi	(Indonesia) H^{1}	Hasnur Group	List: Front: None; Back: None; Sleeves: None; Shorts: None
Borneo Samarinda U20s	(Indonesia) Susanto	(Indonesia) SPECS	Ansaf	List: Front: Pupuk Kaltim; Back: PStore; Sleeves: Ghani Raya Mandiri; Shorts: None
Dewa United U20s	(Indonesia) Gaguk Setia	(Indonesia) DRX	None	List: Front: None; Back: None; Sleeves: None; Shorts: None
Madura United U20s	(Indonesia) David Agus Prianto	(Indonesia) DRX	None	List: Front: None; Back: None; Sleeves: None; Shorts: None
Malut United U20s	(Indonesia) Edwin Umbas	(Indonesia) SPECS	Mineral Trobos	List: Front: PT Gebe Sinar Perkasa; Back: PT Gebe Prima Mandiri; Sleeves: Lumbung Ikan Maluku; Shorts: None
Persebaya U20s	(Indonesia) Lulut Kistono	(Indonesia) AZA	Kapal Api	List: Front: None; Back: None; Sleeves: None; Shorts: None
Persib U20s	(Indonesia) Sabrun Hanafi	(Indonesia) Sportama	Indofood	List: Front: None; Back: None; Sleeves: None; Shorts: None
Persija U20s	(Indonesia) Purwanto	(Indonesia) Juaraga	None	List: Front: None; Back: None; Sleeves: None; Shorts: None
Persik U20s	(Indonesia) Edi Sahputra	(Indonesia) DRX	Athletes For Good	List: Front: Le Minerale; Back: None; Sleeves: None; Shorts: None
Persis U20s	(Indonesia) Danang Danur	(Indonesia) Amrta	Free Fire	List: Front: None; Back: None; Sleeves: None; Shorts: None
Persita U20s	(Indonesia) Ilham Jaya Kesuma	(Indonesia) 1953^{1}	Indomilk	List: Front: Moya, Matrix Broadband, Aetra Tangerang; Back: Indomie; Sleeves: Palang Merah Indonesia, KABOOM Creative; Shorts: None
PSBS U20s	(Indonesia) Usman Halik	(Indonesia) Kasumasa^{1}	NusaTuna	List: Front: PT Freeport Indonesia, Bank Papua, Ulam Laut; Back: Kopi ABC; Sleeves: None; Shorts: None
PSIS U20s	(Indonesia) Dicky Firasat	(Indonesia) DRX	None	List: Front: None; Back: None; Sleeves: None; Shorts: None
PSM U20s	(Indonesia) Ahmad Amiruddin	(Indonesia) DRX	Bosowa Corp	List: Front: None; Back: None; Sleeves: None; Shorts: None
PSS U20s	(Indonesia) Anang Hadisaputra	(Indonesia) DRX	Amman Mineral	List: Front: Indomie, MedcoEnergi, Ithaca Resources, Le Minerale; Back: None; Sleeves: None; Shorts: None
Semen Padang U20s	(Indonesia) Zuchli Imran Putra	(Indonesia) SPFC Apparel^{1}	Semen Padang	List: Front: ASIOP; Back: None; Sleeves: None; Shorts: None

Notes:

1. Apparel made by club.

== First round ==
For the first round, 18 teams split into three group of six. Each group playing home and away double-game round-robin matches. The winners and runner-ups from each group along with two best third-placed teams advanced to second round

=== Group A ===
Pos	Team	Pld	W	D	L	GF	GA	GD	Pts	Qualification
1	Dewa United U20s	20	13	4	3	41	24	+17	43	Advance to Second round
2	Persija U20s	20	10	7	3	33	16	+17	37	Advance to Second round
3	Persita U20s	20	11	3	6	39	21	+18	36	Advance to Second round
4	Barito Putera U20s	20	8	4	8	38	18	+20	28	
5	Semen Padang U20s	20	6	2	12	27	42	−15	20	
6	PSBS U20s	20	1	2	17	12	69	−57	5	

Source: 2024–25 EPA Liga 1 U-20
Rules for classification: 1) Points; 2) Head-to-head points; 3) Head-to-head goal difference; 4) Head-to-head goals scored; 5) Goal difference; 6) Goals scored; 7) Fair-play points; 8) Draw.

Home \ Away	DWU	PSJ	PTR	BAR	SMP	BIK	DWU	PSJ	PTR	BAR	SMP	BIK
Dewa United U20s		1–0	1–3	2–1	1–0	5–1		0–0	2–2	3–1	2–2	2–0
Persija U20s	2–3		1–1	1–0	2–1	7–0	2–1		2–1	1–0	2–0	1–0
Persita U20s	1–2	2–0		0–2	5–0	4–1	0–2	0–2		1–0	3–2	1–0
Barito Putera U20s	0–1	0–0	0–0		7–0	4–0	3–3	2–2	0–1		1–2	5–1
Semen Padang U20s	4–2	1–1	2–1	0–1		1–2	1–2	0–4	1–3	0–1		7–1
PSBS U20s	1–4	2–2	0–2	0–4	0–1		0–2	1–1	1–8	0–6	1–2	

Source: 2024–25 EPA Liga 1 U-20
Legend: Blue = home team win; Yellow = draw; Red = away team win.
For upcoming matches, an "a" indicates there is an article about the rivalry between the two participants.

=== Group B ===
Pos	Team	Pld	W	D	L	GF	GA	GD	Pts	Qualification
1	Borneo Samarinda U20s	20	12	3	5	39	35	+4	39	Advance to Second round
2	Persib U20s	20	11	2	7	42	25	+17	35	Advance to Second round
3	PSIS U20s	20	11	1	8	37	24	+13	34	
4	Persis U20s	20	10	2	8	42	33	+9	32	
5	Arema U20s	20	5	4	11	23	47	−24	19	
6	PSS U20s	20	4	2	14	19	38	−19	14	

Source: 2024–25 EPA Liga 1 U-20
Rules for classification: 1) Points; 2) Head-to-head points; 3) Head-to-head goal difference; 4) Head-to-head goals scored; 5) Goal difference; 6) Goals scored; 7) Fair-play points; 8) Draw.

Home \ Away	BOR	PSB	SMG	PSO	AFC	PSS	BOR	PSB	SMG	PSO	AFC	PSS
Borneo Samarinda U20s		3–1	1–0	2–1	2–1	2–1		2–2	2–1	5–2	3–1	3–3
Persib U20s	6–1		0–2	1–1	2–0	4–0	2–0		2–0	1–2	3–1	3–2
PSIS U20s	3–1	2–1		1–0	10–0	0–2	0–2	3–1		3–0	4–2	2–0
Persis U20s	4–1	4–3	1–0		0–1	6–2	3–1	2–1	4–0		4–0	1–2
Arema U20s	1–3	0–1	1–2	2–2		2–1	2–2	0–5	2–2	4–1		2–0
PSS U20s	1–2	0–2	1–2	1–0	0–0		0–1	0–1	1–0	2–4	0–1	

Source: 2024–25 EPA Liga 1 U-20
Legend: Blue = home team win; Yellow = draw; Red = away team win.
For upcoming matches, an "a" indicates there is an article about the rivalry between the two participants.

=== Group C ===
Pos	Team	Pld	W	D	L	GF	GA	GD	Pts	Qualification
1	Bali United U20s	20	13	3	4	37	10	+27	42	Advance to Second round
2	Persebaya U20s	20	12	5	3	42	17	+25	41	Advance to Second round
3	Malut United U20s	20	10	4	6	32	18	+14	34	Advance to Second round
4	PSM U20s	20	10	4	6	31	21	+10	34	
5	Persik U20s	20	5	2	13	19	42	−23	17	
6	Madura United U20s	20	0	2	18	7	60	−53	2	

Source: 2024–25 EPA Liga 1 U-20
Rules for classification: 1) Points; 2) Head-to-head points; 3) Head-to-head goal difference; 4) Head-to-head goals scored; 5) Goal difference; 6) Goals scored; 7) Fair-play points; 8) Draw.

Home \ Away	BLI	PBY	MLT	PSM	KDR	MDR	BLI	PBY	MLT	PSM	KDR	MDR
Bali United U20s		0–0	2–0	2–1	3–0	5–1		3–1	0–1	4–0	3–0	0–0
Persebaya U20s	1–2		1–0	4–2	3–1	5–0	1–1		2–2	4–0	4–1	5–1
Malut United U20s	1–0	1–0		0–2	3–1	6–0	0–1	1–2		2–0	2–1	4–0
PSM U20s	1–0	0–0	1–1		3–0	2–1	1–0	0–1	0–0		2–0	5–0
Persik U20s	0–3	2–3	2–0	2–2		2–1	0–2	0–2	2–2	0–3		1–0
Madura United U20s	0–4	0–0	0–3	0–4	0–2		1–2	0–3	1–3	0–2	1–2	

Source: 2024–25 EPA Liga 1 U-20
Legend: Blue = home team win; Yellow = draw; Red = away team win.
For upcoming matches, an "a" indicates there is an article about the rivalry between the two participants.

=== Ranking of third-placed teams ===
Pos	Grp	Team	Pld	W	D	L	GF	GA	GD	Pts	Qualification
1	A	Persita U20s	20	11	3	6	39	21	+18	36	Advance to the second round
2	C	Malut United U20s	20	10	4	6	32	18	+14	34	Advance to the second round
3	B	PSIS U20s	20	11	1	8	37	24	+13	34	

Source: 2024–25 EPA Liga 1 U-20
Rules for classification: 1) Points; 2) Goal difference; 3) Goals scored; 4) Fair-play points; 5) Draw.

== Second round ==
The top eight teams from the first round will be divided into 2 groups of four teams to play home-and-away round-robin matches. The winners and runner-ups from each group advance to semi-finals.

=== Group X ===
Pos	Team	Pld	W	D	L	GF	GA	GD	Pts	Qualification	DWU	MLT	PSB	BLI
1	Dewa United U20s	6	3	2	1	8	5	+3	11	Advance to the semi-finals		0–0	2–1	3–1
2	Malut United U20s	6	3	1	2	10	9	+1	10	Advance to the semi-finals	1–0		3–1	3–2
3	Persib U20s	6	1	3	2	9	10	−1	6		2–2	4–2		0–0
4	Bali United U20s	6	1	2	3	6	9	−3	5		0–1	2–1	1–1	

Source: 2024–25 EPA Liga 1 U-20
Legend: Blue = home team win; Yellow = draw; Red = away team win.
Rules for classification: 1) Points; 2) Head-to-head points; 3) Head-to-head goal difference; 4) Head-to-head goals scored; 5) Goal difference; 6) Goals scored; 7) Fair-play points; 8) Draw.

=== Group Y ===
Pos	Team	Pld	W	D	L	GF	GA	GD	Pts	Qualification	PTR	PSJ	PBY	BOR
1	Persita U20s	6	5	1	0	10	3	+7	16	Advance to the semi-finals		1–0	2–1	1–0
2	Persija U20s	6	3	1	2	6	4	+2	10	Advance to the semi-finals	1–1		0–1	1–0
3	Persebaya U20s	6	3	0	3	9	7	+2	9		1–3	0–2		3–0
4	Borneo Samarinda U20s	6	0	0	6	1	12	−11	0		0–2	1–2	0–3	

Source: 2024–25 EPA Liga 1 U-20
Legend: Blue = home team win; Yellow = draw; Red = away team win.
Rules for classification: 1) Points; 2) Head-to-head points; 3) Head-to-head goal difference; 4) Head-to-head goals scored; 5) Goal difference; 6) Goals scored; 7) Fair-play points; 8) Draw.

== Knockout round ==
=== Bracket ===
Semi-finals
18 February 2025
Dewa United U20s	1
Persija U20s	0
18 February 2025
Persita U20s	1
Malut United U20s	0

Final
20 February 2025
Dewa United U20s	0 (3)
Persita U20s (p)	0 (4)
Third place play-off
22 February 2025
Persija U20s (a.e.t.)	2
Malut United U20s	1

=== Semi-finals ===
19 February 2025
15:00 UTC +7

Dewa United U20s	1–0	Persija U20s
Farhan 90+5'	Report

Patriot Candrabaga Stadium, Bekasi
Attendance: 100
Referee: Anas Apriliandi

19 February 2025
15:00 UTC +7

Persita U20s	1–0	Malut United U20s
Diovani 88'	Report

MJCC Stadium, Bekasi
Attendance: 100
Referee: Bakhtiar Wildan

=== Third place play-off ===
21 February 2025
15:00 UTC +7

Persija U20s	2–1 (a.e.t.)	Malut United U20s
Kanaka 26'; Wondo 108'	Report	Ariel 45' (pen.)

MJCC Stadium, Bekasi
Attendance: 100
Referee: Syahrul Tri Purwanto

=== Final ===
22 February 2025
15:00 UTC +7

Dewa United U20s	0–0 (a.e.t.)	Persita U20s
	Report
Penalties
Saiful (penalty scored); Alfin (penalty scored); Farhan (penalty missed); Givary (penalty scored); Zaki (penalty missed)	3–4	(penalty scored) Mufti; (penalty scored) Azwan; (penalty scored) Diovani; (penalty scored) Reyhan; (penalty missed) Kaka

Patriot Candrabaga Stadium, Bekasi
Attendance: 200
Referee: Anas Apriliandi

== Season statistics ==
=== Top Goalscorers ===
Rank	Player	Team	Goals
1	(Indonesia) Raihan Utama	Dewa United U20s	18
2	(Indonesia) Evan Ajid	Persita U20s	16
3	(Indonesia) Rifael Salmon	Malut United U20s	15
4	(Indonesia) Aprilian Bernadus	Borneo Samarinda U20s	13
5	(Indonesia) Fabio Papia	Borneo Samarinda U20s	11

== Awards ==
Best Player: Evan Ajid (Persita U20s)

Top Goalscorer: Raihan Utama (18 goals) (Dewa United U20s)

Best Coach: Ilham Jaya Kesuma (Persita U20s)

Fair Play Team: Persija U20s

Third place: Persija U20s

Runner-up: Dewa United U20s

Champions: Persita U20s

== See also ==
- 2024–25 EPA Liga 1 U-18
- 2024–25 EPA Liga 1 U-16
- Elite Pro Academy
