= Yuswanto Aditya =

Indonesian footballer

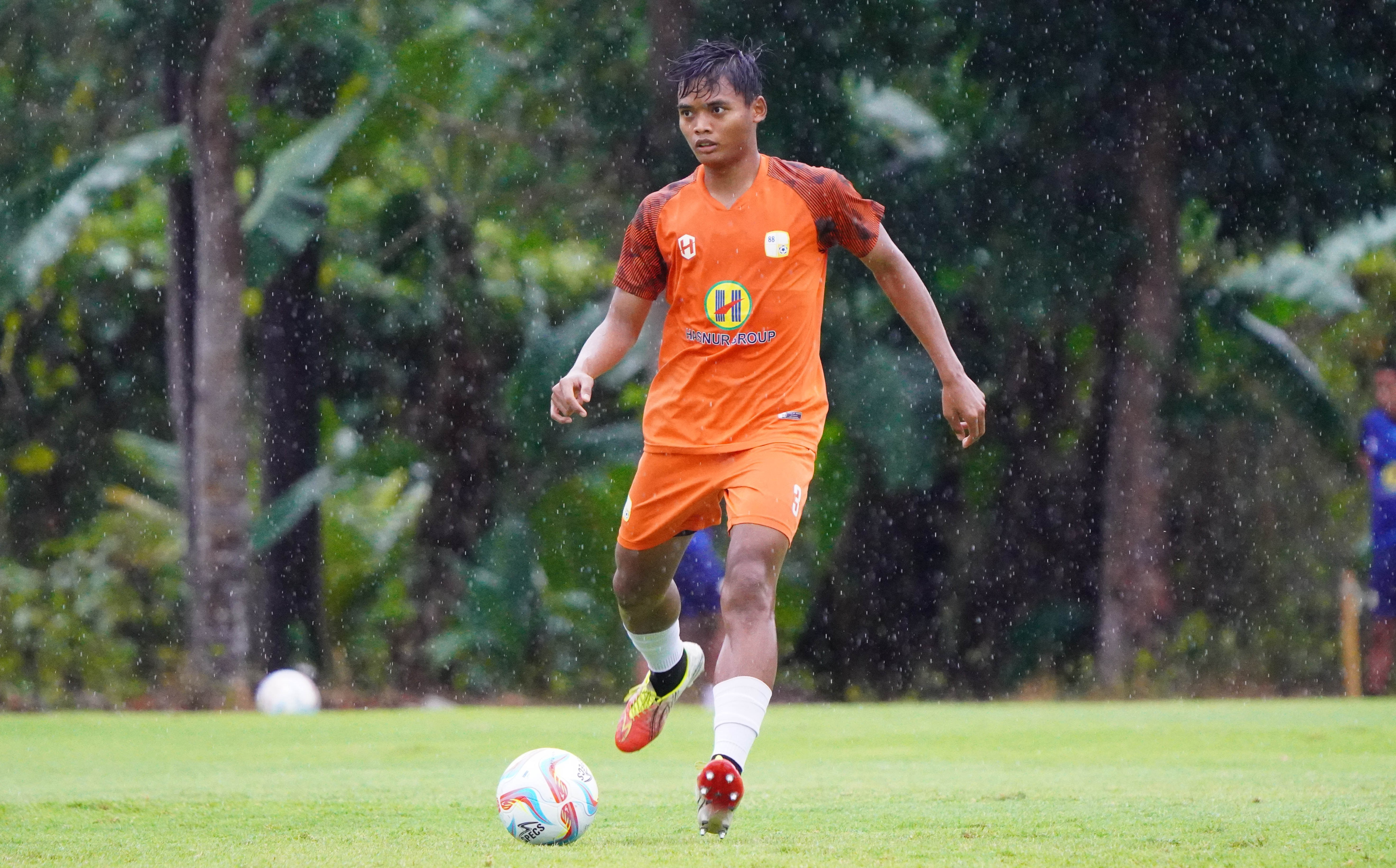

Personal information
- Full name: Yuswanto Aditya
- Date of birth: 10 May 2000 (age 26)
- Place of birth: Bandung, Indonesia
- Height: 1.79 m (5 ft 10 in)
- Position: Centre-back

Team information
- Current team: Barito Putera
- Number: 3

Youth career
- 2016–2017: Bina Taruna
- 2017–2018: Persija Jakarta
- 2018–2019: Barito Putera

Senior career*
Years	Team	Apps	(Gls)
2019–	Barito Putera	57	(3)
- * Club domestic league appearances and goals as of 22 February 2026

Yuswanto Aditya (born 10 May 2000) is an Indonesian professional footballer who plays as a centre-back for Liga 2 club Barito Putera.

== Club career ==
=== Barito Putera ===
Aditya is one of the young players promoted from the Barito Putera youth team. as well as being the Captain and he plays as a center-back. Aditya made his professional debut on 27 September 2021 in a match against PSM Makassar at the Wibawa Mukti Stadium, Cikarang.

He picked up his first career red card in a 2–1 defeat at RANS Nusantara on 29 August 2022. Despite this, Aditya returned to the first team and playing 23 minutes in second half for the side on 11 December, in a 0–0 draw over Dewa United. In a match against Persis Solo three days later, he played the full 90 minutes for the first time in a 0–0 draw in game-week 14. On 20 December, in a match against Bhayangkara saw Aditya playing in the centre–back position, where he continued to form a partnership with Renan Alves for the full 90 minutes.

He scored his first goal for the side on 9 March 2023 in a 2–1 win against Persebaya Surabaya. He remains the first choice after the club underwent a period of coach changes, recorded in the last six matches, he has always been a starting line-up choice under new coach Rahmad Darmawan.

== International career ==
In November 2019, Aditya was named as Indonesia U-20 All Stars squad, to play in U-20 International Cup held in Bali.

== Career statistics ==
=== Club ===
As of 22 February 2026.

Club	Season	League			Cup		Continental		Other		Total	
Club	Season	Division	Apps	Goals	Apps	Goals	Apps	Goals	Apps	Goals	Apps	Goals
Barito Putera	2019	Liga 1	0	0	0	0	–		0	0	0	0
Barito Putera	2020	Liga 1	0	0	0	0	–		0	0	0	0
Barito Putera	2021–22	Liga 1	5	0	0	0	–		0	0	5	0
Barito Putera	2022–23	Liga 1	23	1	0	0	–		0	0	23	1
Barito Putera	2023–24	Liga 1	13	1	0	0	–		0	0	13	1
Barito Putera	2024–25	Liga 1	13	1	0	0	–		0	0	13	1
Barito Putera	2025–26	Championship	3	0	0	0	–		0	0	3	0
Career total			57	3	0	0	0	0	0	0	57	3

== Honours ==
=== Individual ===
- Liga 1 U-20 Best Player: 2019
