= Feri Sistianto =

Indonesian footballer

Personal information
- Full name: Feri Sistianto
- Date of birth: January 13, 1997 (age 29)
- Place of birth: Kuningan, Indonesia
- Height: 1.80 m (5 ft 11 in)
- Position: Centre-back

Youth career
- 2016: PS TNI

Senior career*
Years	Team	Apps	(Gls)
2017–2018	PSBL Langsa	13	(0)
2019–2021	Persela Lamongan	6	(0)
2021	Semen Padang	4	(0)
2022	Sriwijaya	0	(0)
- * Club domestic league appearances and goals

Feri Sistianto (born January 13, 1997) is an Indonesian professional footballer who plays as a centre-back.

== Club career ==
=== Persela Lamongan ===
Sistianto was signed for Persela Lamongan to play in Liga 1 in the 2019 season. He made his league debut on 20 September 2019 in a match against Arema at the Surajaya Stadium, Lamongan.

=== Semen Padang ===
In 2021, Sistianto signed a contract with Indonesian Liga 2 club Semen Padang. He made his league debut on 11 October against Sriwijaya at the Gelora Sriwijaya Stadium, Palembang.

== Honours ==
=== Club ===
PS TNI U-21

- Indonesia Soccer Championship U-21: 2016
