= Kahar Kalu Muzakkar =

Indonesian footballer

Kahar Kalu
Personal information
- Full name: Kahar Kalu Muzakkar
- Date of birth: 5 May 1999 (age 27)
- Place of birth: Makassar, Indonesia
- Height: 1.75 m (5 ft 9 in)
- Position: Forward

Team information
- Current team: De Red
- Number: 25

Youth career
- 2016: PSM Makassar
- 2018–2019: Barito Putera

Senior career*
Years	Team	Apps	(Gls)
2017	Persbul Buol	5	(1)
2018	Persikota Tangerang	5	(2)
2019–2023	Barito Putera	10	(2)
2023–2024	Persekat Tegal	16	(4)
2024–2025	Gresik United	20	(5)
2025–2026	Sumsel United	23	(5)
2026–	De Red	1	(0)
- * Club domestic league appearances and goals as of 22:00, 12 September 2026 (UTC+7)

Kahar Kalu Muzakkar (born 5 May 1999) is an Indonesian professional footballer who plays as a forward for Championship club De Red.

== Club career ==
=== Barito Putera ===
Kahar Muzakkar made his first-team debut on 6 March 2020 as a substitute in a match against Bali United. This season was suspended on 27 March 2020 due to the COVID-19 pandemic. The season was abandoned and was declared void on 20 January 2021.

== International career ==
In November 2019, Kahar was named as Indonesia U-20 All Stars squad, to play in U-20 International Cup held in Bali.

== Career statistics ==
=== Club ===
As of 12 September 2026

Club	Season	League			Cup		Continental		Other		Total	
Club	Season	Division	Apps	Goals	Apps	Goals	Apps	Goals	Apps	Goals	Apps	Goals
Persbul Buol	2017	Liga 2	5	1	0	0	–		0	0	5	1
Persikota Tangerang	2018	Liga 3	5	2	0	0	–		0	0	5	2
Barito Putera	2019	Liga 1	0	0	0	0	–		0	0	0	0
Barito Putera	2020	Liga 1	2	1	0	0	–		0	0	2	1
Barito Putera	2021	Liga 1	2	0	0	0	–		4 (Note: Appearances in Menpora Cup)	0	6	0
Barito Putera	2022-23	Liga 1	6	1	0	0	–		0	0	6	1
Persekat Tegal	2023–24	Liga 2	16	4	0	0	0	0	0	0	16	4
Gresik United	2024–25	Liga 2	20	5	0	0	0	0	0	0	20	5
Sumsel United	2025–26	Championship	23	5	0	0	–		0	0	23	5
de Red	2026–27	Championship	1	0	0	0	–		0	0	1	0
Career total			80	19	0	0	0	0	4	0	84	19

== Honours ==
=== Individual ===
- Liga 1 U-20 Top Goalscorer: 2019 (15 goals)
