= Denny Agus =

Indonesian footballer (born 2000)

Personal information
- Full name: Denny Agus Setiawan
- Date of birth: 11 August 2000 (age 26)
- Place of birth: Surabaya, Indonesia
- Height: 1.69 m (5 ft 7 in)
- Positions: Winger; attacking midfielder

Youth career
- 2017–2019: Persebaya U-20

Senior career*
| Years | Team | Apps | (Gls) |
| 2021 | Persikota Tangerang | 18 | (9) |
| 2022–2024 | Persebaya Surabaya | 14 | (2) |
| 2023–2024 | → Deltras (loan) | 3 | (0) |
| 2025 | PPSM Magelang | 10 | (2) |
- * Club domestic league appearances and goals as of 12 February 2025

Denny Agus Setiawan (born 11 August 2000) is an Indonesian professional footballer who plays as a winger or attacking midfielder.

== Club career ==
=== Persikota Tangerang ===
On 2021, Denny Agus signed a one-year contract with Liga 3 club Persikota Tangerang. He made 18 league appearances for Persikota Tangerang, scoring nine goals in the 2021 Liga 3 (Indonesia).

=== Persebaya Surabaya ===
He was signed for Persebaya Surabaya and played in Liga 1 in 2022–2023 season. Denny chose 74 as his squad number, because that was the number he wore when he was at Persebaya U-20. And finally being able to play in the senior team. Denny made his league debut on 25 July 2022 in a match against Persita Tangerang at the Gelora Bung Tomo Stadium, Surabaya. On 24 December, he scored his first league goal in a 1–2 victory against Dewa United.

On 15 April 2023, Denny scored the opening goal for the club, scoring a long range in a 3–0 home win over Dewa United. With this victory, Persebaya is certain to finish in sixth place in the final standings of the 2022–23 Liga 1. He made 13 league appearances for Persebaya, scoring two goals, during the 2022–23 season.

== Career statistics ==
=== Club ===
As of 12 February 2025

| Club | Season | League | | | Cup | | Continental | | Other | | Total | |
| Club | Season | Division | Apps | Goals | Apps | Goals | Apps | Goals | Apps | Goals | Apps | Goals |
|---|---|---|---|---|---|---|---|---|---|---|---|---|
| Persikota Tangerang | 2021 | Liga 3 | 18 | 9 | 0 | 0 | – | | 0 | 0 | 18 | 9 |
| Persebaya Surabaya | 2022–23 | Liga 1 | 13 | 2 | 0 | 0 | – | | 1 (Note: Appearances in Indonesia President's Cup) | 0 | 14 | 2 |
| Persebaya Surabaya | 2023–24 | Liga 1 | 1 | 0 | 0 | 0 | – | | 0 | 0 | 1 | 0 |
| Deltras (loan) | 2023–24 | Liga 2 | 3 | 0 | 0 | 0 | – | | 0 | 0 | 3 | 0 |
| PPSM Magelang | 2024–25 | Liga 4 | 10 | 2 | 0 | 0 | – | | 0 | 0 | 10 | 2 |
| Career total | | | 45 | 13 | 0 | 0 | 0 | 0 | 1 | 0 | 46 | 13 |

== Honours ==
=== Club ===
Persebaya Surabaya U20

- Elite Pro Academy U-20: 2019

Persikota Tangerang

- Liga 3 Banten: 2021
