= 2016 Indonesia Soccer Championship U-21 =

Indonesian Soccer Championship U-21
- Season: 2016
- Dates: 12 August 2016 – 13 December 2016
- Champions: PS TNI; 1st title
- Matches: 96
- Goals: 284 (2.96 per match)
- Best player: Dimas Drajad
- Top goalscorer: Irfan Jaya (14 goals)
- Biggest home win: Persela 8-0 Arema Cronus (16 September 2016)
- Biggest away win: Persiba 0-6 PSM (14 September 2016); Arema Cronus 0-6 Persela (30 September 2016); Arema Cronus 0-6 Gresik Utd (13 October 2016)
- Highest scoring: Bali United 8-1 Arema Cronus (18 October 2016)

The 2016 Indonesia Soccer Championship U-21 season was the first and only edition of Indonesia Soccer Championship U-21, a competition that is intended for footballers under the age of twenty-one years. This season's participants are the U-21 teams of 2016 Indonesia Soccer Championship A teams except for Sriwijaya F.C., that withdrew from the tournament.

PS TNI won the title on 13 December 2016 after defeating Bali United 6–1 in the final.

== Format ==
The competition is divided into four acts consist of two group stages and two knockout rounds, which is the semifinals and final. On the first stage, the teams are divided into three groups each containing six clubs, the top two teams of each group and the two best third place will advance to the second stage. The second stage consists of two groups containing four teams in each group, the best team from each group and the best runner-up will advance to the semifinals. The winner of the semifinals will advance to the final to battle for the championship.

Only players born on or after 1 March 1995 are eligible to compete in the tournament.

== Personnel and stadium ==
Note: Flags indicate national team as has been defined under FIFA eligibility rules. Managers may hold more than one non-FIFA nationality.

Team	City/Province	Stadium	Coach
Arema Cronus U-21	Malang, East Java	Kanjuruhan	(Indonesia) Donny Suherman
Bali United U-21	Gianyar, Bali	Kapten I Wayan Dipta	(Indonesia) Wayan Arsana
Barito Putera U-21	Banjarmasin, South Kalimantan	May 17th	(Indonesia) Meidiansyah
Bhayangkara U-21	Semarang, Central Java	Citarum	(Indonesia) Nova Arianto
Persegres Gresik United U-21	Gresik, East Java	Tri Dharma	(Indonesia) Pudji Handoko
Madura United U-21	Pamekasan, East Java	Gelora Bangkalan	(Indonesia) Istiko Hadi Susanto
Mitra Kukar U-21	Kutai Kartanegara, East Kalimantan	Andi Mattalatta^{1} Mandala^{1}	(Indonesia) M. Darwis
Persela U-21	Lamongan, East Java	Surajaya	(Indonesia) Didik Ludianto
Perseru U-21	Yapen Islands Regency, Papua	Andi Mattalatta^{1} Mandala^{1}	(Indonesia) Choirul Huda
Persib U-21	Bandung, West Java	Si Jalak Harupat	(Indonesia) Budiman
Persiba U-21	Balikpapan, East Kalimantan	Andi Mattalatta^{1} Mandala^{1}	(Indonesia) Amir Yusuf Pohan
Persija U-21	Jakarta, DKI Jakarta	Cenderawasih	(Indonesia) Muhamad Nasir
Persipura U-21	Jayapura, Papua	Andi Mattalatta^{1} Mandala^{1}	(Indonesia) Abraham Tobias
PS TNI U-21	Bogor, West Java	Pakansari	(Indonesia) Miftahudin
PSM U-21	Makassar, South Sulawesi	Andi Mattalatta^{1} Mandala^{1}	(Indonesia) Budiardjo Thalib
Pusamania Borneo U-21	Samarinda, East Kalimantan	Andi Mattalatta^{1} Mandala^{1}	(Indonesia) Iwan Setiawan
Semen Padang U-21	Padang, West Sumatra	Haji Agus Salim	(Indonesia) Delfi Adri

Note:
^1 All teams in Group 3 play with home tournament system at the Andi Mattalatta Stadium, Makassar for the first half and at Mandala Stadium, Jayapura for the second half of the season.

== First round ==
First stage of the group stage will be started on 12 August 2016, except for Group 3 will be started on 31 August 2016 All groups will play home and away round-robin tournament, with the exception of Group 3 which will play home tournament round-robin.

Key to colours in group tables
Top two of each group and the best third places teams advances to the second group stage

=== Group 1 ===
Pos	Team	Pld	W	D	L	GF	GA	GD	Pts	Qualification	TNI	BFC	PSIB	SPFC	PSJA	SFC
1	PS TNI	8	5	2	1	15	5	+10	17	Advance to second stage	—	0–0	2–1	2–1	5–0	
2	Bhayangkara	8	4	4	0	12	7	+5	16	Advance to second stage	1–1	—	1–0	2–1	4–2	
3	Persib	8	3	2	3	16	10	+6	11	Advance to second stage	1–3	1–1	—	2–0	3–0	
4	Semen Padang	8	3	2	3	10	9	+1	11		1–0	0–0	2–2	—	3–0	
5	Persija	8	0	0	8	6	28	−22	0		0–2	2–3	1–6	1–2	—	
6	Sriwijaya	0	0	0	0	0	0	0	0	Withdrawn						—

Updated to match(es) played on 27 November 2016. Source: ISC U-21

=== Group 2 ===
Pos	Team	Pld	W	D	L	GF	GA	GD	Pts	Qualification	PSLA	BLU	GRES	BRPT	MDU	ARE
1	Persela	10	7	1	2	27	7	+20	22	Advance to second stage	—	3–1	1–0	2–1	3–1	8–0
2	Bali United	10	4	4	2	19	10	+9	16	Advance to second stage	0–2	—	1–1	3–0	2–0	8–1
3	Persegres Gresik United	10	4	4	2	15	6	+9	16		1–1	1–1	—	2–0	1–1	1–0
4	Barito Putera	10	5	1	4	11	11	0	16		2–1	0–1	1–0	—	3–0	1–0
5	Madura United	10	3	3	4	12	16	−4	12		1–0	1–1	0–2	1–1	—	3–1
6	Arema Cronus	10	0	1	9	6	40	−34	1		0–6	1–1	0–6	1–2	2–4	—

Updated to match(es) played on 18 November 2016. Source: ISC U-21

=== Group 3 ===
Pos	Team	Pld	W	D	L	GF	GA	GD	Pts	Qualification	PSPR	PBFC	PSM	PSRU	MKU	PSBA
1	Persipura	10	6	1	3	14	7	+7	19	Advance to second stage	—	2–0	1–0	4–0	3–0	1–0
2	Pusamania Borneo	10	5	3	2	17	7	+10	18	Advance to second stage	3–1	—	1–2	0–0	0–0	3–0
3	PSM	10	5	2	3	18	11	+7	17	Advance to second stage	0–1	1–1	—	2–1	1–1	3–1
4	Perseru	10	3	3	4	13	17	−4	12		2–1	1–5	3–0	—	1–1	3–1
5	Mitra Kukar	10	2	4	4	7	13	−6	10		2–0	0–2	1–3	2–1	—	0–0
6	Persiba	10	1	3	6	5	19	−14	6		0–0	0–2	0–6	1–1	2–0	—

Updated to match(es) played on 13 November 2016. Source: ISC U-21

=== Ranking of third-placed teams ===
To search for the two best teams, a mechanism that respects the principle of equality is used. Because Group 1 contains only five teams while Groups 2 and 3 filled with six teams, the results achieved by the third-placed teams in final standings of Group 2 and 3 against bottom-placed teams in their group didn't count.

Pos	Grp	Team	Pld	W	D	L	GF	GA	GD	Pts	Qualification
1	1	Persib	8	3	2	3	16	10	+6	11	Advance to second stage
2	3	PSM	8	3	2	3	9	10	−1	11	Advance to second stage
3	2	Persegres Gresik United	8	2	4	2	8	6	+2	10	

Updated to match(es) played on 27 November 2016. Source: ISC U-21

== Second round ==
The second round will be held on 2–7 December 2016. All groups will play half season round-robin tournament.

=== Group X ===
All matches will be held in Kapten I Wayan Dipta Stadium, Gianyar Regency

Pos	Team	Pld	W	D	L	GF	GA	GD	Pts	Qualification
1	PS TNI	3	3	0	0	6	2	+4	9	Advance to semifinals
2	Bali United	3	2	0	1	7	5	+2	6	Advance to semifinals
3	Persib	3	1	0	2	3	6	−3	3	
4	Persipura	3	0	0	3	2	5	−3	0	

Updated to match(es) played on 7 December 2016. Source: ISC U-21
2 December 2016
16:30

Persib	1-3	PS TNI

Kapten I Wayan Dipta Stadium, Gianyar
2 December 2016
20:00

Persipura	2-3	Bali United

Kapten I Wayan Dipta Stadium, Gianyar

4 December 2016
16:30

Bali United	1-2	PS TNI

Kapten I Wayan Dipta Stadium, Gianyar
4 December 2016
20:00

Persipura	0-1	Persib

Kapten I Wayan Dipta Stadium, Gianyar

7 December 2016
16:30

Persib	1-3	Bali United

Kapten I Wayan Dipta Stadium, Gianyar
7 December 2016
20:00

PS TNI	1-0	Persipura

Kapten I Wayan Dipta Stadium, Gianyar

=== Group Y ===
All matches will be held in Gelora Bumi Kartini Stadium, Jepara

Pos	Team	Pld	W	D	L	GF	GA	GD	Pts	Qualification
1	Persela	3	1	2	0	8	5	+3	5	Advance to semifinals
2	Pusamania Borneo	3	1	2	0	6	5	+1	5	Advance to semifinals
3	Bhayangkara	3	1	1	1	5	5	0	4	
4	PSM	3	0	1	2	4	8	−4	1	

Updated to match(es) played on 7 December 2016. Source: ISC U-21
2 December 2016
16:30

Pusamania Borneo	2-2	PSM

Gelora Bumi Kartini Stadium, Jepara
2 December 2016
20:00

Bhayangkara	2-2	Persela

Gelora Bumi Kartini Stadium, Jepara

4 December 2016
16:30

Pusamania Borneo	1-1	Persela

Gelora Bumi Kartini Stadium, Jepara
4 December 2016
20:00

PSM	0-1	Bhayangkara

Gelora Bumi Kartini Stadium, Jepara

7 December 2016
16:30

Bhayangkara	2-3	Pusamania Borneo

Gelora Bumi Kartini Stadium, Jepara
7 December 2016
20:00

Persela	5-2	PSM

Gelora Bumi Kartini Stadium, Jepara

== Knockout stage ==
Semi-finals
10 December – Bantul
Pusamania Borneo	0
PS TNI	2
10 December – Bantul
Bali United	4
Persela	3

Final
13 December – Surakarta
PS TNI	6
Bali United	1
Third place
13 December – Surakarta
Pusamania Borneo	1
Persela	3

=== Semifinals ===
10 December 2016
16:30

Pusamania Borneo	0-2	PS TNI

Sultan Agung Stadium, Bantul
10 December 2016
20:00

Bali United	4-3	Persela

Sultan Agung Stadium, Bantul

=== Third Place ===
13 December 2016
16:30

Pusamania Borneo	1-3	Persela

Manahan Stadium, Surakarta

=== Final ===
13 December 2016
20:00

PS TNI	6-1	Bali United

Manahan Stadium, Surakarta

== Champions ==
Champions
PS TNI
1st title

== See also ==
- 2016 Indonesia Soccer Championship A
- 2016 Indonesia Soccer Championship B
- 2016 Liga Nusantara
- 2016 Soeratin Cup
