= 2019 Liga 1 U-20 =

Tournament details
- Country: Indonesia
- Dates: 20 July – 12 October 2019
- Teams: 18

Final positions
- Champions: Persebaya U20s
- Runners-up: Barito Putera U20s
- Third place: PSIS U20s
- Fourth place: Bhayangkara U20s

Tournament statistics
- Matches played: 118
- Goals scored: 313 (2.65 per match)
- Top goal scorer: Kahar Kalu (15 goals)

Awards
- Best player: Yuswanto Aditya
- Goals scored in penalty shoot-outs are not included.

The 2019 Liga 1 U-20 was the ninth edition of the Indonesia Junior Level League system since its introduction in 2008 and the first of the Elite Pro Academy since being changed from an under-19 to under-20. The season started on 20 July and finished with a final on 12 October 2019.

Persebaya U20s won the title on 12 October 2019 after defeating Barito Putera U20s 3–0 on penalties after 3–3 draw until extra time in the final.

== First round ==
First round was the group stage and was started on 20 July 2019. Group A and B played home and away round-robin tournament while Group C played home tournament round-robin. The winners and runner-ups from each group along with two best third-placed teams advanced to second round.

=== Group A ===
Pos	Team	Pld	W	D	L	GF	GA	GD	Pts	Qualification	PSJ	BHA	PSS	TIR	SPD	BDL
1	Persija U20s	10	6	4	0	24	6	+18	22	Advance to the second round	—	3–3	0–0	3–0	1–1	9–0
2	Bhayangkara U20s	10	6	3	1	19	10	+9	21	Advance to the second round	1–1	—	0–0	3–0	1–0	3–1
3	PSS U20s	10	4	4	2	22	9	+13	16	Advance to the second round	0–1	1–2	—	2–1	3–0	9–0
4	TIRA-Persikabo U20s	10	3	0	7	13	21	−8	9		0–3	0–2	1–3	—	3–1	5–2
5	Semen Padang U20s	10	2	2	6	9	16	−7	8		0–1	2–3	1–1	2–1	—	0–1
6	Badak Lampung U20s	10	2	1	7	11	36	−25	7		1–2	2–1	3–3	0–2	1–2	—

Source: Liga Indonesia
Legend: Blue = home team win; Yellow = draw; Red = away team win.

=== Group B ===
Pos	Team	Pld	W	D	L	GF	GA	GD	Pts	Qualification	BPT	PSL	SMG	PSB	MDU	ARE
1	Barito Putera U20s	10	8	2	0	18	6	+12	26	Advance to the second round	—	2–1	2–1	2–1	3–1	2–0
2	Persela U20s	10	5	2	3	10	9	+1	17	Advance to the second round	0–3	—	1–1	2–0	1–0	1–0
3	PSIS U20s	10	4	4	2	17	9	+8	16	Advance to the second round	1–1	2–1	—	0–0	4–0	4–0
4	Persib U20s	10	4	2	4	10	9	+1	14		1–1	1–2	1–0	—	1–0	2–0
5	Madura United U20s	10	3	1	6	11	16	−5	10		0–1	0–1	2–2	2–1	—	5–2
6	Arema U20s	10	0	1	9	3	20	−17	1		0–1	0–0	1–2	0–2	0–1	—

Source: Liga Indonesia
Legend: Blue = home team win; Yellow = draw; Red = away team win.

=== Group C ===
Pos	Team	Pld	W	D	L	GF	GA	GD	Pts	Qualification	PBY	PPR	BLU	BOR	KTP	PSM
1	Persebaya U20s	10	7	1	2	15	7	+8	22	Advance to the second round	—	1–3	1–0	0–1	1–0	2–0
2	Persipura U20s	10	6	3	1	18	9	+9	21	Advance to the second round	2–2	—	2–0	0–0	2–1	2–1
3	Bali United U20s	10	5	1	4	14	11	+3	16		0–1	2–1	—	1–0	5–2	3–1
4	Borneo U20s	10	2	5	3	6	9	−3	11		0–3	1–1	1–1	—	0–1	2–1
5	Kalteng Putra U20s	10	2	2	6	9	19	−10	8		0–2	0–2	2–1	1–1	—	2–2
6	PSM U20s	10	1	2	7	10	17	−7	5		1–2	1–3	0–1	0–0	3–0	—

Source: Liga Indonesia
Legend: Blue = home team win; Yellow = draw; Red = away team win.

=== Ranking of third-placed teams ===
Pos	Grp	Team	Pld	W	D	L	GF	GA	GD	Pts	Qualification
1	A	PSS U20s	10	4	4	2	22	9	+13	16	Advance to the second round
2	B	PSIS U20s	10	4	4	2	17	9	+8	16	Advance to the second round
3	C	Bali United U20s	10	5	1	4	14	11	+3	16	

Source: Liga Indonesia

== Second round ==
Second round was the group stage and is played from 10 September – 1 October 2019. All groups played home and away round-robin tournament. The winners and runner-ups from each group advance to semi-finals. The draw for the group was held on 3 September 2019.

=== Group X ===
Pos	Team	Pld	W	D	L	GF	GA	GD	Pts	Qualification	PBY	BHA	PSL	PSS
1	Persebaya U20s	6	4	1	1	14	2	+12	13	Advance to the semi-finals	—	3–0	0–1	1–1
2	Bhayangkara U20s	6	3	1	2	5	4	+1	10	Advance to the semi-finals	0–1	—	0–0	2–0
3	Persela U20s	6	3	1	2	4	6	−2	10		0–4	0–1	—	1–0
4	PSS U20s	6	0	1	5	2	13	−11	1		0–5	0–2	1–2	—

Source: Liga Indonesia
Legend: Blue = home team win; Yellow = draw; Red = away team win.

=== Group Y ===
Pos	Team	Pld	W	D	L	GF	GA	GD	Pts	Qualification	BPT	SMG	PSJ	PPR
1	Barito Putera U20s	6	3	2	1	11	9	+2	11	Advance to the semi-finals	—	1–0	2–2	2–0
2	PSIS U20s	6	1	4	1	6	5	+1	7	Advance to the semi-finals	2–0	—	1–1	1–1
3	Persija U20s	6	1	4	1	8	8	0	7		2–2	1–1	—	2–1
4	Persipura U20s	6	1	2	3	7	10	−3	5		3–4	1–1	1–0	—

Source: Liga Indonesia
Legend: Blue = home team win; Yellow = draw; Red = away team win.

== Knock-out round ==
=== Bracket ===
Semi-finals
9 October – Gianyar
Persebaya U20s	3
PSIS U20s	1
9 October – Gianyar
Barito Putera U20s	2
Bhayangkara U20s	0

Final
12 October – Gianyar
Persebaya U20s (pen.)	3 (3)
Barito Putera U20s	3 (0)
Third place
12 October – Gianyar
PSIS U20s	3
Bhayangkara U20s	2

=== Semi-finals ===
9 October 2019
16:00 UTC+7

Persebaya U20s	3–1	PSIS U20s
Dwiki Mardiyanto 18'; Zulfikar Akhmad 52' (pen.); Kresna Fajar Okoca 90'	Report	Rifqi Arya Wardana 35' (o.g.)

Kapten I Wayan Dipta Stadium, Gianyar
Attendance: 239
Referee: Ryan Nanda Saputra
9 October 2019
20:00 UTC+7

Barito Putera U20s	2–0	Bhayangkara U20s
Delan Selang 83'; Kahar Kalu 90'	Report

Kapten I Wayan Dipta Stadium, Gianyar
Attendance: 299
Referee: Irul Hidayat

=== Third place ===
12 October 2019
16:00 UTC+7

PSIS U20s	3–2	Bhayangkara U20s
Adithya Jorry Guruh 36'; Yusran Rumadaul 64' (o.g.); La Ode Muhammad Harun 67'	Report	Amanar Abdillah 50'; Yudista Irfa Pangestu 82'

Kapten I Wayan Dipta Stadium, Gianyar
Attendance: 198
Referee: Fadli Nurdiana

=== Final ===
12 October 2019
20:00 UTC+7

Persebaya U20s	3–3 (a.e.t.)	Barito Putera U20s
Mochammad Supriadi 13', 59'; Brylian Aldama 90+4'	Report	Delan Selang 45+1'; Kahar Kalu 60', 84'
Penalties
Denny Agus (penalty missed); Rizky Ridho (penalty scored); Risky Ramadhan (penalty scored); Haykal Alhafiz (penalty scored)	3–0	(penalty missed) Rizky Iswantur; (penalty missed) Herudin; (penalty missed) Yuswanto Aditya

Kapten I Wayan Dipta Stadium, Gianyar
Attendance: 531
Referee: Naufal Adya Fairuski

== Awards ==
- Top goalscorers: Kahar Kalu (Barito Putera U20s, 15 goals)
- Best player: Yuswanto Aditya (Barito Putera U20s)
- Fair-play team: PSIS U20s
