= Ghifari Vaiz Adhitya =

Indonesian footballer

Ghifari Vaiz
Personal information
- Full name: Ghifari Vaiz Adhitya
- Date of birth: 6 May 1999 (age 27)
- Place of birth: Banyuwangi, Indonesia
- Height: 1.70 m (5 ft 7 in)
- Position: Forward

Team information
- Current team: Persid Jember
- Number: 9

Youth career
- 2013–2015: ASIFA
- 2016–2017: Persela Lamongan

Senior career*
Years	Team	Apps	(Gls)
2017–2019	Persela Lamongan	9	(0)
2020	PSGC Ciamis	0	(0)
2021	Persid Jember	4	(1)
2022	NZR Sumbersari	2	(1)
2023–2024	Persid Jember	3	(1)
2024	Persedikab Kediri	4	(0)
2025	Mitra Surabaya	10	(4)
2025–	Persid Jember	10	(5)
- * Club domestic league appearances and goals as of 4 February 2026

Ghifari Vaiz Adhitya (born 6 May 1999) is an Indonesian professional footballer who plays as forward for Liga 4 club Persid Jember.

== Honours ==
=== Individual ===
Persela U19

- Liga 1 U19 Top goalscorer: 2017
