= PB Tangkas =

Indonesian badminton club

- Sport: Badminton
- Founded: February 21, 1951
- Location: Jakarta, Indonesia
- Arena: Tangkas Sport Centre, Jl. Tanjung Duren, Komplek Greenville Blok Q, Duri Kepa, Kebon Jeruk, West Jakarta
- Website: https://pbtangkas.id/

Persatuan Bulu Tangkis Tangkas, more commonly known as PB Tangkas, is one of the oldest badminton clubs in Indonesia. Founded on February 21, 1951, in Jakarta, the club has achieved at least 10 world championship titles, 4 Olympic medals, 10 All England titles, and 10 Asian Games titles.

== History ==
PB Tangkas was founded on February 21, 1951, in Jakarta by a group of badminton enthusiasts including R.D. Saputra, Soewarjo, Said, and Kosasih. The club was established three months before the founding of the Indonesian Badminton Association (PBSI). Initially, its activities were held on a simple empty court on Jalan Barito I, Kebayoran Baru. The primary goal was to provide a space for its members to regularly play badminton. The Suhandinata family became involved in the early 1960s when Justian Suhandinata joined PB Tangkas at age 11. In 1961, when club founder R.D. Saputra fell ill, the leadership was passed on to Suharso Suhandinata, Justian's father. Since then, PB Tangkas has been managed by the Suhandinata family and continues to grow.

== Achievements ==
PB Tangkas has recorded various achievements at national and international levels. Names in bold indicate PB Tangkas athletes.

=== World Champions ===
- 1980, Jakarta – **Ade Chandra** / Christian Hadinata
- 1980, Jakarta – **Verawaty Fadjrin**
- 1983, Copenhagen – **Icuk Sugiarto**
- 1993, Birmingham – **Joko Suprianto**
- 1993, Birmingham – **Ricky Soebagdja** / Gunawan
- 1995, Lausanne – **Ricky Soebagdja** / **Rexy Mainaky**
- 2001, Seville – **Hendrawan**
- 2005, Anaheim – **Nova Widianto** / **Liliyana Natsir**
- 2007, Kuala Lumpur – **Nova Widianto** / **Liliyana Natsir**
- 2013, Guangzhou – **Liliyana Natsir** / Tontowi Ahmad

=== Olympic Medals ===
- 1992, Barcelona – Bronze: **Hermawan Susanto**
- 1996, Atlanta – Gold: **Ricky Soebagdja** / **Rexy Mainaky**
- 2000, Sydney – Silver: **Hendrawan**
- 2008, Beijing – Silver: **Nova Widianto** / **Liliyana Natsir**

=== All England Champions ===
- 1972 – **Ade Chandra** / Christian Hadinata
- 1973 – **Ade Chandra** / Christian Hadinata
- 1979 – **Verawaty Fadjrin** / Imelda Wigoena
- 1995 – **Ricky Soebagdja** / **Rexy Mainaky**
- 1996 – **Ricky Soebagdja** / **Rexy Mainaky**
- 2012 – **Liliyana Natsir** / Tontowi Ahmad
- 2013 – **Liliyana Natsir** / Tontowi Ahmad
- 2017 – **Marcus Fernaldi Gideon** / Kevin Sanjaya Sukamuljo
- 2018 – **Marcus Fernaldi Gideon** / Kevin Sanjaya Sukamuljo
- 2024 – **Jonatan Christie**

=== Asian Games Champions ===
- 1974, Tehran – **Regina Masli** / Christian Hadinata
- 1978, Bangkok – **Ade Chandra** / Christian Hadinata
- 1978, Bangkok – **Verawaty Fadjrin** / Imelda Wigoena
- 1982, New Delhi – **Icuk Sugiarto** / Christian Hadinata
- 1994, Hiroshima – **Ricky Soebagdja** / **Rexy Mainaky**
- 1994, Hiroshima – **Joko Suprianto**
- 1998, Bangkok – **Ricky Soebagdja** / **Rexy Mainaky**
- 1998, Bangkok – **Hendrawan**
- 2018, Jakarta-Palembang – **Jonatan Christie**

== Facilities and Training ==
PB Tangkas currently operates a training center at the Tangkas Sport Centre in Greenville, West Jakarta, which began construction in 1986. Previously, under Suharso's leadership, the club trained regularly at Hall C Senayan. The club has been appointed by the Badminton World Federation (BWF) as a High Performance Badminton World Training Centre, in collaboration with the International Olympic Committee (IOC), due to its compliance with international standards in athlete training and development.

== Sponsors ==
PB Tangkas has been sponsored by Bimantara, Bogasari, Alfamart, Specs, and later Intiland.

== Awards ==
The Chairman of PB Tangkas, Justian Suhandinata, received the "Honorary Life Vice President" award from the BWF for his contributions to national and international badminton. The award was presented at the BWF AGM on May 20, 2017, in Gold Coast, Australia. Justian is the only Indonesian to ever receive this honor. He has also served as IBF Vice President from 1996 to 1999 and 1999–2001, BWF Council Member, and PBSI Advisory Board Member for the 2020–2024 period.

== Athletes ==
As of 2022, PB Tangkas had 36 athletes under its management. Four of them were part of the national training center (Pelatnas) in Cipayung: Jonatan Christie, Christian Adinata, Zachariah Sumanti, and Winny Oktavina Kandow.

In May 2025, Jonatan Christie decided to leave the national team and return to training with PB Tangkas. "I still have the fire. Being a professional athlete doesn't mean I can be more relaxed. I just need flexibility in my program because I am now a husband and father," said Jonatan at Pelatnas Cipayung, East Jakarta, on Thursday, May 15, 2025. He opted to become a professional athlete, thus giving up his status and rights as a national team player. Previously, national athletes had to follow all of the structured and systematic training programs, training six days a week with family time only available from Saturday afternoon to Sunday night.
