= Todd Rivaldo Ferre =

Indonesian footballer

Todd Ferre
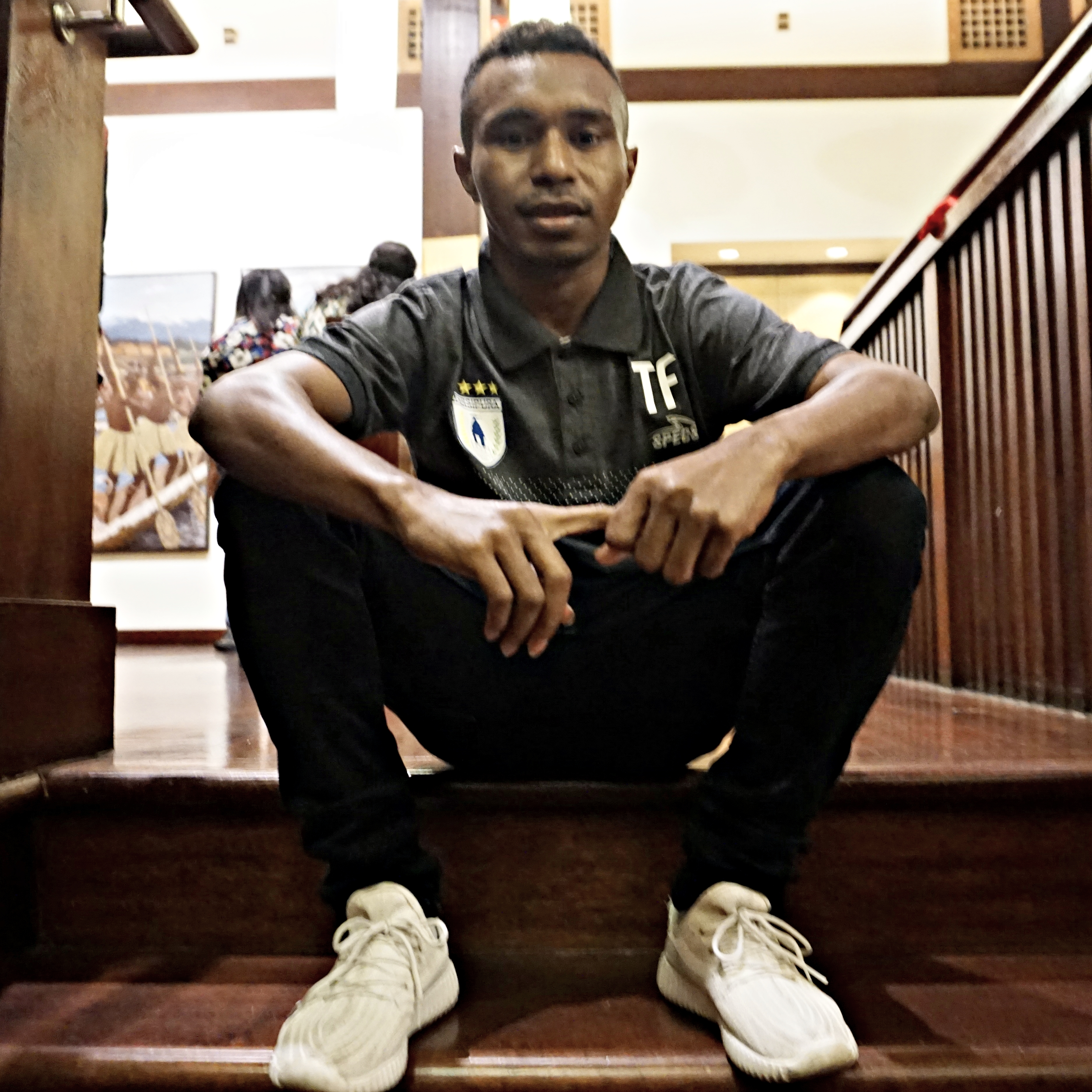
- Todd Ferre with Persipura Jayapura in 2018

Personal information
- Full name: Todd Rivaldo Albert Ferre
- Date of birth: 15 March 1999 (age 27)
- Place of birth: Jayapura, Indonesia
- Height: 1.58 m (5 ft 2 in)
- Positions: Attacking midfielder; right winger

Team information
- Current team: Persipura Jayapura
- Number: 46

Youth career
- SSB Imanuel
- 2016: PPLP Papua
- 2016–2017: Pertamina Soccer School
- 2017: Persipura Jayapura

Senior career*
| Years | Team | Apps | (Gls) |
| 2018–2022 | Persipura Jayapura | 58 | (10) |
| 2021 | → Lampang (loan) | 12 | (1) |
| 2022–2024 | PSS Sleman | 45 | (2) |
| 2024–2025 | PSBS Biak | 26 | (0) |
| 2025– | Persipura Jayapura | 15 | (0) |

International career
| 2018 | Indonesia U19 | 10 | (6) |
| 2019 | Indonesia U23 | 2 | (0) |
Medal record
Men's football
Representing Indonesia
AFF U-19 Youth Championship
| Third place | 2018 Indonesia | Team |
AFF U-22 Youth Championship
| Winner | 2019 Cambodia | Team |
- * Club domestic league appearances and goals as of 2 October 2026

Todd Rivaldo Albert Ferre (born 15 March 1999) is an Indonesian professional footballer who plays as an attacking midfielder and right winger for Championship club Persipura Jayapura.

== Club career ==
=== Early career ===
Before becoming a football player, Rivaldo started his career as a futsal player.

Then, he received an offer to join the Persipura U-19 team. He helped Persipura to win the 2017 Liga 1 U-19 also scored a freekick in the final match against Persib U-19. Persipura coach at that time, Peter Butler, then called Rivaldo to play in the senior team.

=== Persipura Jayapura ===
==== 2018 season: First team breakthrough ====
Rivaldo made his debut in 2018 Liga 1 when Persipura were beaten 1–3 by Arema. He scored a goal in the 90th minute. Although, his goal did not save Mutiara Hitam from defeat. He scored and assisted a goal, in a 6–0 win against Madura United. Persipura finished 12th in the league, with Rivaldo making 15 appearances and scored 3 goals.

==== 2019 season: Best Young Player and Team of the season ====
On 2 October 2019, Rivaldo scored a brace in Persipura 3–0 win against Persikabo 1973. On 11 November, Rivaldo scored a late equaliser to make the score 2–2 against Bali United. He made 29 appearances and scored 5 goal, helping Persipura finish 3rd in the league. He was awarded the Best Young Player Award, beating other contestant Terens Puhiri and Asnawi Mangkualam, also awarded as Team of The Season.

==== 2020 season ====
Rivaldo started against Persebaya, as Persipura won 3–4. Rivaldo played all Persipura game until matchday 3, as the league was postponed and then cancelled.

=== Lampang F.C. (loan) ===
In February 2021, Rivaldo was loaned to Thai League 2 club, Lampang. He was loaned for the remainder of the season. On 7 February, Rivaldo made his league debut coming on as 95th-minute substitute for Jeerachai Ladadok in a 2–0 win against Uthai Thani. Rivaldo scored his first goal against Nongbua Pitchaya as his team drew 1-1. Rivaldo helped Lampang to finish 12th with 12 appearances and 1 goal.

==== 2021-22 season: Return to Persipura ====
After a short stint at Thailand, Rivaldo returned to Persipura. Rivaldo started in Persipura's first league game against Persita Tangerang, but couldn't help his team avoid a 1–2 defeat.

=== PSS Sleman ===
On 12 May 2022, Ferre joined PSS Sleman. He made his league debut on 23 July 2022 in a match against PSM Makassar at the Maguwoharjo Stadium, Sleman.

== International career ==
In 2018, Rivaldo represented the Indonesia under-19, in the 2018 AFC U-19 Championship. Rivaldo scored a hat-trick in a group stage match against Qatar under-19, which Indonesia lost 6–5.

== Career statistics ==
=== Club ===
As of match played 2 October 2026

| Club | Season | League | | | Cup | | Continental | | Other | | Total | |
| Club | Season | Division | Apps | Goals | Apps | Goals | Apps | Goals | Apps | Goals | Apps | Goals |
|---|---|---|---|---|---|---|---|---|---|---|---|---|
| Persipura Jayapura | 2018 | Liga 1 | 15 | 3 | 0 | 0 | 0 | 0 | 0 | 0 | 15 | 3 |
| Persipura Jayapura | 2019 | Liga 1 | 29 | 6 | 0 | 0 | 0 | 0 | 0 | 0 | 29 | 6 |
| Persipura Jayapura | 2020 | Liga 1 | 3 | 0 | 0 | 0 | 0 | 0 | 0 | 0 | 3 | 0 |
| Persipura Jayapura | 2021–22 | Liga 1 | 11 | 1 | 0 | 0 | 0 | 0 | 0 | 0 | 11 | 1 |
| Persipura Jayapura | Total | | 58 | 10 | 0 | 0 | 0 | 0 | 0 | 0 | 58 | 10 |
| Lampang (loan) | 2020–21 | Thai League 2 | 12 | 1 | 0 | 0 | 0 | 0 | 0 | 0 | 12 | 1 |
| PSS Sleman | 2022–23 | Liga 1 | 27 | 2 | 0 | 0 | 0 | 0 | 6 (Note: Appearances in Indonesia President's Cup) | 0 | 33 | 2 |
| PSS Sleman | 2023–24 | Liga 1 | 18 | 0 | 0 | 0 | 0 | 0 | 0 | 0 | 18 | 0 |
| PSS Sleman | Total | | 45 | 2 | 0 | 0 | 0 | 0 | 6 | 0 | 51 | 2 |
| PSBS Biak | 2024–25 | Liga 1 | 26 | 0 | 0 | 0 | 0 | 0 | 0 | 0 | 26 | 0 |
| Persipura Jayapura | 2025–26 | Championship | 12 | 0 | 0 | 0 | 0 | 0 | 0 | 0 | 12 | 0 |
| Persipura Jayapura | 2026–27 | Championship | 3 | 0 | 0 | 0 | 0 | 0 | 0 | 0 | 3 | 0 |
| Career total | | | 156 | 12 | 0 | 0 | 0 | 0 | 6 | 0 | 162 | 12 |

== Honours ==
=== Club ===
Persipura U-19

- Liga 1 U-19: 2017

=== International ===
Indonesia U-19

- AFF U-19 Youth Championship third place: 2018

Indonesia U-22

- AFF U-22 Youth Championship: 2019

=== Individual ===
- Liga 1 U-19 Best Player: 2017
- Liga 1 Best Young Player: 2019
- Liga 1 Team of the Season: 2019
- Indonesian Soccer Awards: Best Young Footballer 2019
