= Beckham Putra =

Indonesian footballer

- Beckham with Indonesia in 2025

Personal information
- Full name: Beckham Putra Nugraha
- Date of birth: 29 October 2001 (age 25)
- Place of birth: Bandung, Indonesia
- Height: 1.64 m (5 ft 5 in)
- Positions: Attacking midfielder; winger

Team information
- Current team: Persib Bandung
- Number: 7

Youth career
- 2017–2018: Persib Bandung

Senior career*
Years	Team	Apps	(Gls)
2018–	Persib Bandung	148	(17)

International career^{‡}
2019–2020	Indonesia U19	9	(4)
2021–2023	Indonesia U23	12	(3)
2025–	Indonesia	11	(2)
Medal record
Men's football
Representing Indonesia
Southeast Asian Games
Gold medal – first place	2023 Cambodia	Team
FIFA Series
Runner-up	2026 Indonesia
AFF U-23 Championship
Runner-up	2023 Thailand	Team
AFF U-19 Youth Championship
Third place	2019 Vietnam
- * Club domestic league appearances and goals as of 1 November 2026 ‡ National team caps and goals as of 22:19, 7 August 2026 (UTC+7)

Beckham Putra Nugraha (born 29 October 2001), commonly known as Etam, is an Indonesian professional footballer who plays as an attacking midfielder or a winger for Super League club Persib Bandung and the Indonesia national team.

== Early life ==
Beckham Putra Nugraha was born on 29 October 2001, in Bandung, West Java, Indonesia. He is the third child of Budi Nugraha and Yuyun Zawariyah. He has older brother who's also a footballer, Gian Zola. He was enrolled to football school POR UNI Bandung at the age of 8 years old.

Beckham's first name was given by his father in tribute to English football legend David Beckham. His father was inspired after watching David Beckham's 87th-minute goal from the halfway line for Manchester United against Wimbledon during the opening match of the 1996–97 FA Premier League season.

== Club career ==
=== Early career ===
Beckham is a member of the U-19 Persib squad that won 2018 Liga 1 U-19. He finished the 2018 season as the top scorer with 9 goals.

=== Persib Bandung ===
Beckham's stunning performances in the 2018 League 1 U-19 event made him promoted to the Persib senior team by the coach Miljan Radović. Beckham made his debut for Persib on 15 August 2018 in the match Piala Indonesia 2018–19 when his team against PSKC Cimahi. He scored his first goal for Persib on 11 February 2019 in the last 32 against Persiwa Wamena in the 79th minute.

On 18 September 2021, Beckham scored his first official league goal for Persib with scored a brace in 2021–22 Liga 1, earning them a 2–2 draw over Bali United. On September 22, 2025, Beckham Putra was trusted as the team captain at the age of 23, in the 2025–26 Super League match against Arema FC which was won by Persib with a score of 2–1.

== International career ==
On 5 June 2025, Beckham made his first appearance for Indonesia on 2026 FIFA World Cup qualifying match against China, in substitution at 74th minute. On 27 March 2026, Beckham scored his first two goals for Indonesia against the Saint Kitts and Nevis in the 2026 FIFA Series.

== Personal life ==
Beckham is the younger brother of Gian Zola.

Beckham married his wife, Devi Novelasari on 26 January 2025, in Bandung.

== Career statistics ==
=== Club ===
As of 1 November 2026

Club	Season	League			Cup (Note: Includes Piala Indonesia.)		League Cup		Continental		Other (Note: Appearances in Indonesia President's Cup.)		Total	
Club	Season	Division	Apps	Goals	Apps	Goals	Apps	Goals	Apps	Goals	Apps	Goals	Apps	Goals
Persib Bandung	2019	Liga 1	4	0	2	1	–		–		3	0	9	1
Persib Bandung	2020	Liga 1	1	0	0	0	–		–		0	0	1	0
Persib Bandung	2021–22	Liga 1	22	5	0	0	–		–		8 (Note: Appearances in Menpora Cup.)	0	30	5
Persib Bandung	2022–23	Liga 1	25	1	0	0	–		–		3	0	28	1
Persib Bandung	2023–24	Liga 1	31	2	0	0	–		–		0	0	31	2
Persib Bandung	2024–25	Liga 1	29	6	0	0	–		5 (Note: Appearances in AFC Champions League Two)	1	0	0	34	7
Persib Bandung	2025–26	Super League	31	3	0	0	–		8	0	0	0	39	3
Persib Bandung	2026–27	Super League	7	0	0	0	0	0	2	0	1	0	10	0
Career total			150	17	2	1	0	0	15	1	15	0	182	19

=== International ===
As of match played 7 August 2026

Appearances and goals by national team and year
National team	Year	Apps	Goals
Indonesia	2025	4	0
Indonesia	2026	7	2
Total		11	2

As of match played 27 March 2026
Scores and results list Indonesia's goal tally first, score column indicates score after each Beckham goal.

List of international goals scored by Beckham Putra
No.	Date	Venue	Cap	Opponent	Score	Result	Competition
1	27 March 2026	Gelora Bung Karno Stadium, Jakarta, Indonesia	5	Saint Kitts and Nevis	1–0	4–0	2026 FIFA Series
2	27 March 2026	Gelora Bung Karno Stadium, Jakarta, Indonesia	5	Saint Kitts and Nevis	2–0	4–0	2026 FIFA Series

== Honours ==
Indonesia U-19

- AFF U-19 Youth Championship third place: 2019

Indonesia U-23

- SEA Games gold medal: 2023
- AFF U-23 Championship runner-up: 2023

Indonesia

- FIFA Series runner-up: 2026

Persib Bandung U-19

- Liga 1 U-19: 2018

Persib Bandung

- Liga 1/Super League: 2023–24, 2024–25, 2025–26

Individual

- Liga 1 U-19 Top Goalscorer: 2018 (9 goals)
- FWP Award 2019: Young Player of the Year
- Persib Bandung Young Player of the Year 2021–22
- Liga 1 Young Player of the Month: September 2022
- Super League Best XI: 2025–26

== See also ==
- Gian Zola
