= 2024–25 EPA Liga 1 U-16 =

EPA Liga 1 U-16
- Season: 2024–25
- Dates: 28 September 2024 – 22 February 2025
- Matches: 144
- Goals: 464 (3.22 per match)
- Top goalscorer: Fardan Ary (17 goals)
- Total attendance: 4,615
- Average attendance: 32
- All statistics correct as of 15 December 2024.

The 2024–25 EPA Liga 1 U-16 will be the sixth edition of the Elite Pro Academy since its introduction in 2018. The season started on 28 September 2024 and will end on 22 February 2025.

Borneo Samarinda U16s were the defending champions after defeating Persis U16s 2–1 in the final previous season.

== Teams ==
=== Locations and stadiums ===
18 teams will compete in the league – split into three groups of six teams.

Locations of non-Java and Madura-based 2024–25 EPA Liga 1 U-20 teams
Red: Group A; Yellow: Group B; Blue: Group C
Locations of Java and Madura-based 2024–25 EPA Liga 1 U-20 teams
Red: Group A; Yellow: Group B; Blue: Group C

Team	Location	Stadium	Capacity
Arema U16s	Malang	ARG Soccer Field	0
Bali United U16s	Gianyar	Bali United Training Center	TBA
Bali United U16s	Gianyar	Ngurah Rai Stadium, at Denpasar	12,000
Barito Putera U16s	Banjarmasin	Green Yakin Soccer Field, at Banjar	0
Borneo Samarinda U16s	Samarinda	Borneo FC Training Centre	0
Dewa United U16s	South Tangerang	Persita Training Ground, at Tangerang	0
Dewa United U16s	South Tangerang	JSI Resort, at Bogor	0
Madura United U16s	Pamekasan	Madura United Training Ground	TBA
Malut United U16s	Sofifi	Marimoi Stadium, at Tidore	TBA
Persebaya U16s	Surabaya	ABC Field of GBT Stadium	0
Persib U16s	Bandung	Arcamanik Stadium	15,000
Persib U16s	Bandung	Sidolig Stadium	5,000
Persib U16s	Bandung	Siliwangi Stadium	25,000
Persija U16s	Jakarta	Persija Training Ground, at Depok	0
Persik U16s	Kediri	Kediri Soccer Field	0
Persis U16s	Surakarta	Surakarta Mini Stadium	TBA
Persis U16s	Surakarta	Banyuanyar Field	TBA
Persis U16s	Surakarta	Sriwedari Stadium	12,000
Persita U16s	Tangerang	Persita Training Ground	0
Persita U16s	Tangerang	Pagedangan Mini Stadium	TBA
PSBS U16s	Biak Numfor	Watubelah Stadium, at Cirebon	16,000
PSIS U16s	Semarang	Wisesa PSIS Training Ground, at Demak	0
PSM U16s	Makassar	Bosowa Sport Center	0
PSS U16s	Sleman	PSS Training Ground	0
Semen Padang U16s	Padang	ASIOP Stadium, at Jakarta	2,000
Semen Padang U16s	Padang	Cibinong Mini Stadium, at Bogor	15,000

=== Personnel and kits ===
Note: Flags indicate national team as has been defined under FIFA eligibility rules. Players and coaches may hold more than one non-FIFA nationality.

Team	Head coach	Kit manufacturer	Main kit sponsor	Other kit sponsor(s)
Arema U16s	(Indonesia) Nanang Husni Mubaroq	(Indonesia) Etams	None	List: Front: None; Back: None; Sleeves: None; Shorts: None
Bali United U16s	(Indonesia) Sandhika Pratama	(Indonesia) SPECS	Indomie	List: Front: None; Back: None; Sleeves: None; Shorts: None
Barito Putera U16s	(Indonesia) Randy Adam	(Indonesia) H^{1}	Hasnur Group	List: Front: None; Back: None; Sleeves: None; Shorts: None
Borneo Samarinda U16s	(Indonesia) Achmad Kusasih	(Indonesia) SPECS	Ansaf	List: Front: Pupuk Kaltim; Back: PStore; Sleeves: Ghani Raya Mandiri; Shorts: None
Dewa United U16s	(Indonesia) Sukardi Paera	(Indonesia) DRX	None	List: Front: None; Back: None; Sleeves: None; Shorts: None
Madura United U16s	(Indonesia) Rakhmad Basuki	(Indonesia) DRX	None	List: Front: None; Back: None; Sleeves: None; Shorts: None
Malut United U16s	(Indonesia) Bambang Andrianto	(Indonesia) SPECS	Mineral Trobos	List: Front: PT Gebe Sinar Perkasa; Back: PT Gebe Prima Mandiri; Sleeves: Lumbung Ikan Maluku; Shorts: None
Persebaya U16s	(Indonesia) Janu Ramadhanis	(Indonesia) AZA	Kapal Api	List: Front: None; Back: None; Sleeves: None; Shorts: None
Persib U16s	(Indonesia) Andri Wijaya	(Indonesia) Sportama	Indofood	List: Front: None; Back: None; Sleeves: None; Shorts: None
Persija U16s	(Indonesia) Taji Prasetio	(Indonesia) Juaraga	None	List: Front: None; Back: None; Sleeves: None; Shorts: None
Persik U16s	(Indonesia) Sugianto	(Indonesia) DRX	Athletes For Good	List: Front: Le Minerale; Back: None; Sleeves: None; Shorts: None
Persis U16s	(Indonesia) Furqon	(Indonesia) Amrta	Free Fire	List: Front: None; Back: None; Sleeves: None; Shorts: None
Persita U16s	(Indonesia) Zainal Anwar	(Indonesia) 1953^{1}	Indomilk	List: Front: Moya, Matrix Broadband, Aetra Tangerang; Back: Indomie; Sleeves: Palang Merah Indonesia, KABOOM Creative; Shorts: None
PSBS U16s	(Indonesia) Yudi Supriatna	(Indonesia) Kasumasa^{1}	NusaTuna	List: Front: PT Freeport Indonesia, Bank Papua, Ulam Laut; Back: Kopi ABC; Sleeves: None; Shorts: None
PSIS U16s	(Indonesia) Dian Hernadi	(Indonesia) DRX	None	List: Front: None; Back: None; Sleeves: None; Shorts: None
PSM U16s	(Indonesia) Muhammad Arfan	(Indonesia) DRX	Bosowa Corp	List: Front: None; Back: None; Sleeves: None; Shorts: None
PSS U16s	(Indonesia) Muhammad Nur Huda	(Indonesia) DRX	Amman Mineral	List: Front: Indomie, MedcoEnergi, Ithaca Resources, Le Minerale; Back: None; Sleeves: None; Shorts: None
Semen Padang U16s	(Indonesia) Robby Mariandy	(Indonesia) SPFC Apparel^{1}	Semen Padang	List: Front: ASIOP; Back: None; Sleeves: None; Shorts: None

Notes:

1. Apparel made by club.

== First round ==
For the first round, 18 teams split into three group of six. Each group playing home and away double-game round-robin matches. The winners and runner-ups from each group along with two best third-placed teams advanced to second round

=== Group A ===
Pos	Team	Pld	W	D	L	GF	GA	GD	Pts	Qualification
1	Persija U16s	20	14	3	3	40	8	+32	45	Advance to Second round
2	Persita U16s	20	10	4	6	27	17	+10	34	Advance to Second round
3	Barito Putera U16s	20	9	5	6	30	29	+1	32	Possible advance to Second round
4	Dewa United U16s	20	9	2	9	25	23	+2	29	
5	PSBS U16s	20	8	2	10	28	37	−9	26	
6	Semen Padang U16s	20	1	2	17	14	50	−36	5	

Source: 2024–25 EPA Liga 1 U-16
Rules for classification: 1) Points; 2) Head-to-head points; 3) Head-to-head goal difference; 4) Head-to-head goals scored; 5) Goal difference; 6) Goals scored; 7) Fair-play points; 8) Draw.

Home \ Away	BAR	DWU	PSJ	PTR	BIK	SMP	BAR	DWU	PSJ	PTR	BIK	SMP
Barito Putera U16s		0–2	2–2	0–0	0–1	4–3		1–1	2–0	2–1	4–1	3–2
Dewa United U16s			0–2	0–1	2–4	2–1			0–1	0–1	1–1	1–0
Persija U16s	3–0			0–0	3–0	0–0	4–0			1–0	3–0	5–0
Persita U16s	0–0	1–0	0–3		3–1		3–1	0–2	0–3		2–3	
PSBS U16s		2–1	0–2			2–3		0–2	1–0			5–0
Semen Padang U16s	0–0	1–3		0–3	1–3		1–2	0–2		0–2	1–2	

Updated to match(es) played on 15 December 2024. Source: 2024–25 EPA Liga 1 U-16
Legend: Blue = home team win; Yellow = draw; Red = away team win.
For upcoming matches, an "a" indicates there is an article about the rivalry between the two participants.

=== Group B ===
Pos	Team	Pld	W	D	L	GF	GA	GD	Pts	Qualification
1	Persis U16s	20	12	3	5	39	13	+26	39	Advance to Second round
2	Persib U16s	20	11	6	3	49	26	+23	39	Advance to Second round
3	Borneo Samarinda U16s	20	10	4	6	40	30	+10	34	Possible advance to Second round
4	PSS U16s	20	9	3	8	39	29	+10	30	
5	PSIS U16s	20	6	3	11	33	40	−7	21	
6	Arema U16s	20	2	1	17	15	77	−62	7	

Source: 2024–25 EPA Liga 1 U-16
Rules for classification: 1) Points; 2) Head-to-head points; 3) Head-to-head goal difference; 4) Head-to-head goals scored; 5) Goal difference; 6) Goals scored; 7) Fair-play points; 8) Draw.

Home \ Away	AFC	BOR	PSB	PSO	SMG	PSS	AFC	BOR	PSB	PSO	SMG	PSS
Arema U16s		2–4	1–1	0–2	3–0 (Note: This match was initially not held due to PSIS's negligence. However, the PSSI disciplinary committee as of 1 October 2024 stated that the match score was Arema 3–0 PSIS.)	2–0		0–3	0–4	0–6	0–1	1–7
Borneo Samarinda U16s	4–2			0–2	5–2	1–3	5–1			1–0	3–2	2–3
Persib U16s	3–0	1–2		0–0	2–0		5–1	1–1		2–2	5–2	
Persis U16s		0–1	3–1		2–1	3–0		0–0	2–1		1–2	1–0
PSIS U16s	4–1		1–2			0–1	6–1		3–4			1–1
PSS U16s		1–2	2–2	1–0	1–0			2–1	1–2	0–1	1–1	

Updated to match(es) played on 15 December 2024. Source: 2024–25 EPA Liga 1 U-16
Legend: Blue = home team win; Yellow = draw; Red = away team win.
For upcoming matches, an "a" indicates there is an article about the rivalry between the two participants.

=== Group C ===
Pos	Team	Pld	W	D	L	GF	GA	GD	Pts	Qualification
1	Madura United U16s	20	14	3	3	45	25	+20	45	Advance to Second round
2	Bali United U16s	20	14	1	5	51	23	+28	43	Advance to Second round
3	Persebaya U16s	20	13	1	6	62	22	+40	40	Possible advance to Second round
4	PSM U16s	20	10	1	9	39	39	0	31	
5	Malut United U16s	20	1	6	13	19	46	−27	9	
6	Persik U16s	20	0	4	16	12	73	−61	4	

Source: 2024–25 EPA Liga 1 U-16
Rules for classification: 1) Points; 2) Head-to-head points; 3) Head-to-head goal difference; 4) Head-to-head goals scored; 5) Goal difference; 6) Goals scored; 7) Fair-play points; 8) Draw.

Home \ Away	BLI	MDR	MLT	PBY	KDR	PSM	BLI	MDR	MLT	PBY	KDR	PSM
Bali United U16s			6–2	2–1	6–0	4–1			3–0	2–4	4–0	3–2
Madura United U16s	3–0		2–1	1–1	3–1		3–1		1–1	1–0	3–0	
Malut United U16s	0–0	2–3			3–3	3–0	0–1	0–2			0–0	3–4
Persebaya U16s	0–1	4–2	4–2			7–0	0–3	4–1	2–0			2–0
Persik U16s		1–5	1–1	0–2		1–2		0–3	1–1	1–3		0–3
PSM U16s	2–3	3–2		2–0	7–1		0–3	0–1		3–1	3–1	

Updated to match(es) played on 15 December 2024. Source: 2024–25 EPA Liga 1 U-16
Legend: Blue = home team win; Yellow = draw; Red = away team win.
For upcoming matches, an "a" indicates there is an article about the rivalry between the two participants.

=== Ranking of third-placed teams ===
Pos	Grp	Team	Pld	W	D	L	GF	GA	GD	Pts	Qualification
1	B	Persib U16s	16	8	5	3	36	21	+15	29	Advance to the second round
2	C	Persebaya U16s	16	9	1	6	35	21	+14	28	Advance to the second round
3	A	Persita U16s	16	7	3	6	17	16	+1	24	

Updated to match(es) played on 15 December 2024. Source: 2024–25 EPA Liga 1 U-16
Rules for classification: 1) Points; 2) Goal difference; 3) Goals scored; 4) Fair-play points; 5) Draw.

== Second round ==
The top eight teams from the first round will be divided into 2 groups of four teams to play home-and-away round-robin matches. The winners and runner-ups from each group advance to semi-finals.

=== Group X ===
Pos	Team	Pld	W	D	L	GF	GA	GD	Pts	Qualification
1	Winner of Group A	0	0	0	0	0	0	0	0	Advance to the semi-finals
2	Winner of Group C	0	0	0	0	0	0	0	0	Advance to the semi-finals
3	Runner-up of Group B	0	0	0	0	0	0	0	0	
4	2nd best third-placed team	0	0	0	0	0	0	0	0	

First match(es) will be played: 18 January 2025. Source: 2024–25 EPA Liga 1 U-20
Rules for classification: 1) Points; 2) Head-to-head points; 3) Head-to-head goal difference; 4) Head-to-head goals scored; 5) Goal difference; 6) Goals scored; 7) Fair-play points; 8) Draw.

=== Group Y ===
Pos	Team	Pld	W	D	L	GF	GA	GD	Pts	Qualification
1	Winner of Group B	0	0	0	0	0	0	0	0	Advance to the semi-finals
2	Runner-up of Group A	0	0	0	0	0	0	0	0	Advance to the semi-finals
3	Runner-up of Group C	0	0	0	0	0	0	0	0	
4	1st best third-placed team	0	0	0	0	0	0	0	0	

First match(es) will be played: 18 January 2025. Source: 2024–25 EPA Liga 1 U-20
Rules for classification: 1) Points; 2) Head-to-head points; 3) Head-to-head goal difference; 4) Head-to-head goals scored; 5) Goal difference; 6) Goals scored; 7) Fair-play points; 8) Draw.

== Knockout round ==
=== Bracket ===
Semi-finals
18 February 2025
Winner of Group X
Runner-up of Group Y
18 February 2025
Winner of Group Y
Runner-up of Group X

Final
20 February 2025
Winner of Semi-final 1
Winner of Semi-final 2
Third place play-off
22 February 2025
Loser of Semi-final 1
Loser of Semi-final 2

=== Semi-finals ===
18 February 2025

Winner of Group X	v	Runner-up of Group Y

18 February 2025

Winner of Group Y	v	Runner-up of Group X

=== Third place play-off ===
20 February 2025

Loser of Semi-final 1	v	Loser of Semi-final 2

=== Final ===
22 February 2025

Winner of Semi-final 1	v	Winner of Semi-final 2

== Season statistics ==
=== Top Goalscorers ===
As of 15 December 2024

Rank	Player	Team	Goals
1	(Indonesia) Fardan Ary Setyawan	Madura United U16s	17
2	(Indonesia) Rohmat Nurhidaya	PSM U16s	13
2	(Indonesia) Jiad Fardhan Bayhaqi	Persib U16s	13
