= Melaspas =

Melaspas is a Balinese ritual cleansing and purification of buildings recently completed or newly reoccupied, including a rumah (home), kantor (office), toko (shop), and kandang (stables). Sometimes, culturally important objects like masks can be the subject of the ceremony to remove pollution.

Melaspas are carried out by Hindus in Bali, Indonesia. The word melaspas comes from Bali which consists of two words that MLAs and Pas. MLAs means dividing and Pas means to fit in. Melaspas also reflects that buildings are usually made up of two elements, namely wood and Batu (stone). For Balinese Hindus, this ceremony must be carried out and has become a tradition.

== Implementation ==
Melaspas ceremony classified into three categories ability to hold the ceremony, namely:

- Kanista ceremony held relatively small.
- Madyaupacara held classified as intermediate.
- The main ceremony held relatively large.

=== Ngayaban Caru ===
- Invite the Buta Kola.
- Provide labaan.
- Expel or return a variety of spirits who were living or inhabiting the building to its original place. And then bring is believed to be the god Hurdle means to deter the presence of spirits -roh bully.

=== Ngayaban Pamlaspas ===
Ngayaban Pamlaspas are usually preceded by:

- Orti speech aimed at building mudra.
- Pairing ulap-ulap in buildings that are adapted to the type of building.
- If the building is a sacred place, the bottom of the building to be placed pedagingan dug hole and on the top is filled with lotus of Emas (gold).
- Pangurip-urip, namely charcoal diulaskan in each building that symbolizes the Tri Murti : Brahma, Vishnu and Iswara. Many Hindus believe that the building has been established that the spirit of life.
- Ngayaban fitting pamlaspas and also Ngayaban banten ayaban that begins by giving offerings to Sanggah Surya or piece of bamboo towering.
- Ngayaban caru prabot.

=== Ngeteg-Linggih ===
In a sacred place melaspas (palinggih), the ceremony at the level of middle and nistaning main can be executed at once.
