= Ulul Azmi =

Indonesian footballer

Personal information
- Full name: Ulul Azmi
- Date of birth: 8 July 2000 (age 26)
- Place of birth: Bukittinggi, Indonesia
- Height: 1.75 m (5 ft 9 in)
- Position: Forward

Youth career
- 2016–2018: Borneo

Senior career*
Years	Team	Apps	(Gls)
2019–2021	Borneo	7	(0)
- * Club domestic league appearances and goals as of 12 December 2019

Ulul Azmi (born July 8, 2000) is an Indonesian professional footballer who plays as a forward.

== Club career ==
=== Borneo ===
He made his professional debut in the Liga 1 on 3 July 2019, against Kalteng Putra.

== Career statistics ==
=== Club ===
As of 15 March 2020.

Club	Season	League			Cup		Continental		Other		Total	
Club	Season	Division	Apps	Goals	Apps	Goals	Apps	Goals	Apps	Goals	Apps	Goals
Borneo	2019	Liga 1	7	0	0	0	–		0	0	7	0
Borneo	2020	Liga 1	0	0	0	0	–		0	0	0	0
Career total			7	0	0	0	0	0	0	0	7	0
