= Elite Pro Academy =

The Elite Pro Academy is an Indonesian system of youth football leagues that are operated by the I-League (previously the PSSI). The system was introduced in early 2018 and was active for the first time during the 2018 season. The system covers the under-16 since 2018, under-18 and under-20 age groups since 2019 & under-14 age groups since 2022. It runs in conjunction with the Super League as a developmental competition.

== Under-20 level ==
EPA One U-20
- Competition logo from the 2023–24 EPA season
- Organising body: I-League
- Founded: 2019
- Number of clubs: 18 (2019–2026); 21 (2026–)
- Current champions: Persija U20s (1st title)
- Most championships: Persebaya U20s; Persis U20s; Persita U20s; Persija U20s (1 title)
- Current: 2026–27

EPA Championship U-19
- Organising body: I-League
- Founded: 2025
- Number of clubs: 20
- Current champions: Sumsel United U20
- Most championships: Sumsel United U20 (1 title)
- Current: 2025–26

This age group for Elite Pro Academy was introduced on 2019. For the 2026–2027 season, the league is divided into three groups, each consisting of seven teams. Each group plays a triple round-robin system. The group winners and the best runner-up advance to the knockout round.

For the 2026–27 season, I-League plans to expand the competition by including clubs from Championship to participate at the U-20 level. A total of 21 participating teams (18 Super League teams and 3 Championship teams that met the youth development qualification criteria for club licensing).

=== 2026–27 teams ===
EPA One U-20

Team	Location
Adhyaksa Banten U20s	Serang
Arema U20s	Malang
Bali United U20s	Gianyar
Bhayangkara Presisi U20s	Bandar Lampung
Borneo Samarinda U20s	Samarinda
Deltras U20s*	Sidoarjo
Dewa United Banten U20s	Serang
Garudayaksa U20s	Bogor
Madura United U20s	Pamekasan
Malut United U20s	Ternate
Persebaya U20s	Surabaya
Persib U20s	Bandung
Persija U20s	Jakarta
Persijap U20s	Jepara
Persik U20s	Kediri
Persis U20s*	Surakarta
Persita U20s	Tangerang
PSIM U20s	Yogyakarta
PSIS U20s*	Semarang
PSM U20s	Makassar
PSS U20s	Sleman

Note: Asteriek denotes Championship teams.

EPA Championship U-20

Team	Location
Barito Putera U20s	Banjarmasin
Bekasi City U20s	Bekasi
Dejan U20s	Depok
Kendal Tornado U20s	Kendal
Persela U20s	Lamongan
Persiba U20s	Balikpapan
Persikad U20s	Depok
Persiku U20s	Kudus
Persipura U20s	Jayapura
Persiraja U20s	Banda Aceh
PSBS U20s	Biak Numfor
PSGC U20s	Ciamis
PSMS U20s	Medan
PSPS U20s	Pekanbaru
RANS Nusantara U20s	Batu
Semen Padang U20s	Padang
Sumsel United U20s	Palembang

=== Championship history ===
Season	Finals host	Champions	Score	Runners-up	Third place	Score	Fourth place
2019	Kapten I Wayan Dipta Stadium, Gianyar	Persebaya U20s	3–3 (3–0 p)	Barito Putera U20s	PSIS U20s	3–2	Bhayangkara U20s
2020	not held due to COVID-19 pandemic in Indonesia						
2021	not held						
2022	not held						
2023–24	Manahan Stadium, Surakarta	Persis U20s	3–1	Persita U20s	Borneo U20s	3–0	Persebaya U20s
2024–25	Patriot Candrabhaga Stadium, Bekasi	Persita U20s	0–0 (4–3 p)	Dewa United U20s	Persija U20s	2–1 (a.e.t.)	Malut United U20s
2025–26	Garudayaksa Football Academy Complex, Bekasi Regency	Persija U20s	1–0	Malut United U20s	No Third-Place Play-off		
2026–27							

== Under-18 level ==
EPA One U-18
- Competition logo from the 2023–24 EPA season
- Organising body: I-League
- Founded: 2019
- Number of clubs: 18 (2019–2025); 19 (2025–2026); 22 (2026–)
- Current champions: Malut United U18s (1st title)
- Most championships: Bhayangkara U18s (2 titles)
- Current: 2026–27

This age group for Elite Pro Academy was introduced on 2019. This league format is the same as under-20 league format. At this age level, an additional team is Garuda United (a youth football team formed by PSSI to serve as a development platform and a foundational framework for Indonesia's age-group national teams).

=== Championship history ===
Season	Finals host	Champions	Score	Runners-up	Third place	Score	Fourth place
2019	Sultan Agung Stadium, Bantul	Bhayangkara U18s	1–0	PSIS U18s	Persija U18s	4–4 (7–6 p)	Bali United U18s
2020	not held due to COVID-19 pandemic in Indonesia						
2021	Si Jalak Harupat Stadium, Bandung	Bali United U18s	2–0	Persib U18s	Persebaya U18s	0–0 (4–3 p)	Borneo U18s
2022	Madya Stadium, Jakarta	Bhayangkara U18s	2–0	Persija U18s	Persebaya U18s	2–1	Persib U18s
2023–24	Garudayaksa Football Academy, Bekasi	PSS Sleman U18s	2–1	Borneo U18s	Persija U18s	4–0	Persis U18s
2024–25	Patriot Candrabhaga Stadium, Bekasi	PSM Makassar U18s	1–1 (4–2 p)	Persija U18s	Semen Padang U18s	1–0	Persik Kediri U18s
2025–26	Garudayaksa Football Academy Complex, Bekasi Regency	Malut United U18s	0–0 (3–2 p)	Persija U18s	No Third-Place Play-off		
2026–27							

== Under-16 level ==
EPA One U-16
- Competition logo from the 2023–24 EPA season
- Organising body: I-League
- Founded: 2018
- Number of clubs: 18 (2019–2026); 21 (2026–)
- Current champions: Persik U16s (1st title)
- Most championships: Persib U16s; Borneo U16s (2 titles)
- Current: 2026–27

This age group was the first level introduced for Elite Pro Academy on 2018. This league format is the same as under-20 and under-18 league format.

=== Championship history ===
Season	Finals host	Champions	Score	Runners-up	Third place	Score	Fourth place
2018	Bumi Sriwijaya Stadium, Palembang	Persib U16s	1–1 (4–3 p)	Bali United U16s	Persija U16s	1–0	Barito Putera U16s
2019	Sultan Agung Stadium, Bantul	TIRA-Persikabo U16s	2–1	Bhayangkara U16s	Persebaya U16s	1–0	Persija U16s
2020	not held due to COVID-19 pandemic in Indonesia						
2021	Si Jalak Harupat Stadium, Bandung	PSM Makassar U16s	2–1	Persib U16s	Borneo U16s	2–0	Persiraja U16s
2022	Madya Stadium, Jakarta	Persib U16s	1–0	Persija U16s	Dewa United U16s	0–0 (3–2 p)	Persebaya U16s
2023–24	Garudayaksa Football Academy, Bekasi	Borneo U16s	2–1	Persis U16s	Persebaya U16s	2–2 (3–1 p)	Barito Putera U16s
2024–25	Patriot Candrabhaga Stadium, Bekasi	Borneo U16s	3–2	Persebaya U16s	Madura United U16s	1–0	Bali United U16s
2025–26	Garudayaksa Football Academy Complex, Bekasi Regency	Persik Kediri U16s	1–1 (5–3 p)	Persis U16s	No Third-Place Play-off		
2026–27							

== Under-14 level ==
EPA Liga 1 U-14
- Organising body: PSSI
- Founded: 2022
- Number of clubs: 18
- Current champions: Dewa United U14s (1st title)
- Most championships: Dewa United U14s (1 title)
- Broadcaster: YouTube (International) (selected matches)

This age group was the first level introduced for Elite Pro Academy on 2022.

=== Championship history ===
Season	Finals host	Champions	Score	Runners-up	Third place	Score	Fourth place
2022	Pulomas Field, Jakarta	Dewa United U14s	3–1	Persis U14s	Bhayangkara U14s	1–0	Persib U14s

== Total titles won ==
The table below shows the total list of champions in the Elite Pro Academy across various age levels.

Rank	Clubs	EPA U20	EPA U18	EPA U16	EPA U14	Total
1	Bhayangkara Presisi	–	2	–	–	2
1	PSM Makassar	–	1	1	–	2
1	Borneo Samarinda	–	–	2	–	2
1	Persib Bandung	–	–	2	–	2
5	Persebaya Surabaya	1	–	–	–	1
5	Persija Jakarta	1	–	–	–	1
5	Persis Solo	1	–	–	–	1
5	Persita Tangerang	1	–	–	–	1
5	Bali United	–	1	–	–	1
5	Malut United	–	1	–	–	1
5	PSS Sleman	–	1	–	–	1
5	Persik Kediri	–	–	1	–	1
5	TIRA-Persikabo	–	–	1	–	1
5	Dewa United Banten	–	–	–	1	1

== Broadcasters ==
U-14 matches of the league are streamed live via the official PSSI YouTube channel.

== See also ==
- Super League
- Championship
- Soeratin Cup
