= SPECS Sport =

Indonesian manufacturing sports company

SPECS
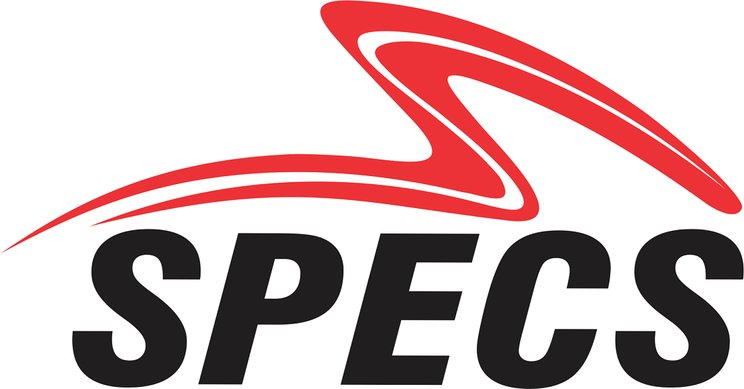
- Company type: Public
- Industry: Sports Apparel and Equipment
- Founded: 1994
- Headquarters: Jakarta, Indonesia
- Products: Shoes; Shirt; Accessories
- Website: www.specs.id

SPECS is a sports company from Indonesia. The company was founded in 1994 in Jakarta. The company produces a wide range of sports equipment. The company is known for sponsoring Indonesian association football players and is a shirt club sponsor in the Liga 1.

== Sponsorships ==
Since 2020 Specs supply the official match ball for Indonesian Liga 1 and Liga 2, and for the home matches of the Indonesia national football team since 2024.

=== Teams ===
==== National teams ====
- Indonesia national futsal team

Football Clubs

- (Indonesia) Persipura Jayapura
- (Indonesia) Bali United F.C.
- (Indonesia) Borneo Samarinda
- (Indonesia) Malut United FC

==== Futsal Clubs ====
- (Indonesia) Electric PLN
- (Indonesia) Permata Indah FC
- (Indonesia) IPC Pelindo

==== Badminton Clubs ====
- (Indonesia) PB Tangkas

=== Athletes ===
As of 2024:

- (Indonesia) Ardiyansyah Runtuboy
- (Indonesia) Caisar Silitonga
- (Indonesia) Fadilah Nurrahman
- (Indonesia) Andre Oktaviansyah
- (Indonesia) Amanar Abdillah
- (Indonesia) Yudha Febrian
- (Indonesia) Fajar Fathurrahman
- (Indonesia) Rio Fahmi
- (Indonesia) Evan Soumilena
- (Indonesia) Samsul Arif
- (Indonesia) Adam Alis
- (Indonesia) Ilham Udin
- (Indonesia) Paulo Sitanggang
- (Indonesia) Wawan Hendrawan
- (Indonesia) Witan Sulaeman
- (Indonesia) Asnawi Mangkualam
- (Indonesia) Sani Rizki
- (Indonesia) Ravi Murdianto
- (Indonesia) Rendi Irwan
- (Indonesia) Ardi Idrus
- (Indonesia) Osas Saha
- (Indonesia) Riko Simanjuntak
- (Indonesia) Zanadin Fariz
- (Indonesia) Maman Abdurrahman
- (Indonesia) Henhen Herdiana
- (Indonesia) Hanis Saghara Putra
- (Indonesia) Dedik Setiawan
- (Indonesia) Alsan Sanda
- (Brazil) Jaimerson Xavier
- (Netherlands) Wiljan Pluim

== Slogans ==
- Melejit Ke Sasaran (1994–1996, English: Soaring to the target)
- Spektakuler Adalah Specs (1996–2000, English: Spectacular is Specs)
- Tampil Lebih Spektakuler (1996–2000, English: Show more Spectacular)
- We Are Sports (2000–present)
