= Borneo F.C. U-21 =

Indonesian football club

Borneo FC U-20
- Full name: Borneo Football Club U-20
- Ground: Segiri Stadium
- Coach: Purwanto
- League: EPA U-20; EPA Super League U20
- 2019: 4th (group stage)
Home colours	Away colours

Borneo FC U-20 is an Indonesian football team located in Samarinda, East Kalimantan. They are the reserve of from Borneo. They currently competing in the Elite Pro Academy U-20.
