= PS Barito Putera U-21 =

PS Barito Putera U-20
- Full name: Persatuan Sepak Bola Barito Putera; U-20
- Nickname(s): Bakantan Anum
- Ground: 17th May Stadium
- Coach: Yunan Helmi
- League: EPA U-20
- 2019: Runners-up
Home colours	Away colours	Third colours

PS Barito Putera U-20 is an active department of youth football club for PS Barito Putera. The club is currently competing in the Elite Pro Academy U-20.

As of Barito Putera promotion to Indonesian Super League in 2013, this team properly competing in Indonesia Super League U-21 at the time.

== Honours ==
- Liga 1 U-19
  - Third-place (1): 2018
- EPA U-20
  - Runners-up (1): 2019
