= Kapten I Wayan Dipta Stadium =

Stadium in Bali, Indonesia

Stadion Kapten I Wayan Dipta
- Stadion Kapten I Wayan Dipta
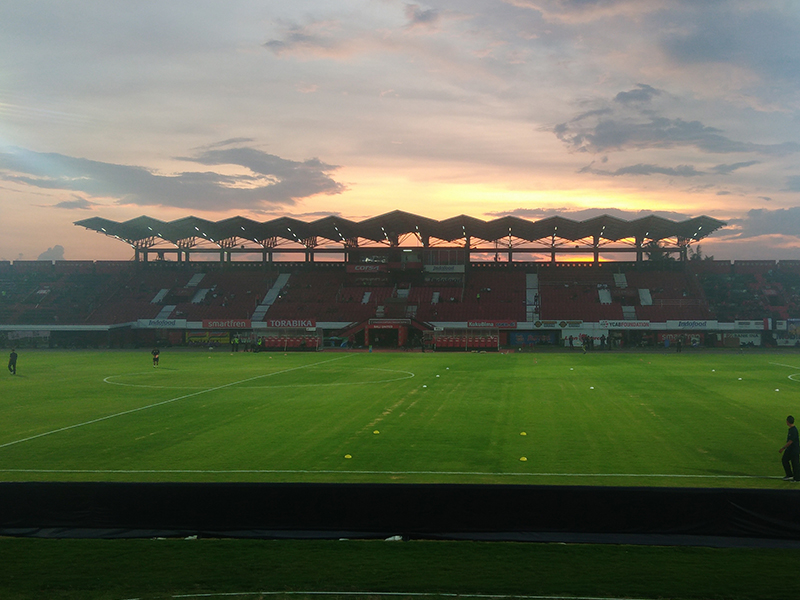
- Interactive map of Stadion Kapten I Wayan Dipta
- Address: Buruan, Blahbatuh, Gianyar Regency
- Location: Bali, Indonesia
- Coordinates: 8°32′48.5″S 115°18′23.4″E
- Owner: Government of Gianyar Regency
- Operator: Bali United
- Capacity: 18,000 Capacity history: 25,000 (2003–2017) 22,931 (2018) 25,081 (2019) 23,081 (2020–2021) 18,000 (2022–present)
- Surface: Grass
- Scoreboard: LED
- Record attendance: 25,057 (Bali United vs Madura United, 22 December 2019)

Construction
- Opened: 19 February 2003
- Renovated: 2017–2018
- Closed: 2008
- Reopened: 2010

Tenants
- Persegi (2001–2005); Persegi Bali (2007); Bali Devata (2011); Persires Bali Devata (2012); Bali United (2015–present); Arema (2023–2024); Indonesia national football team (selected matches)

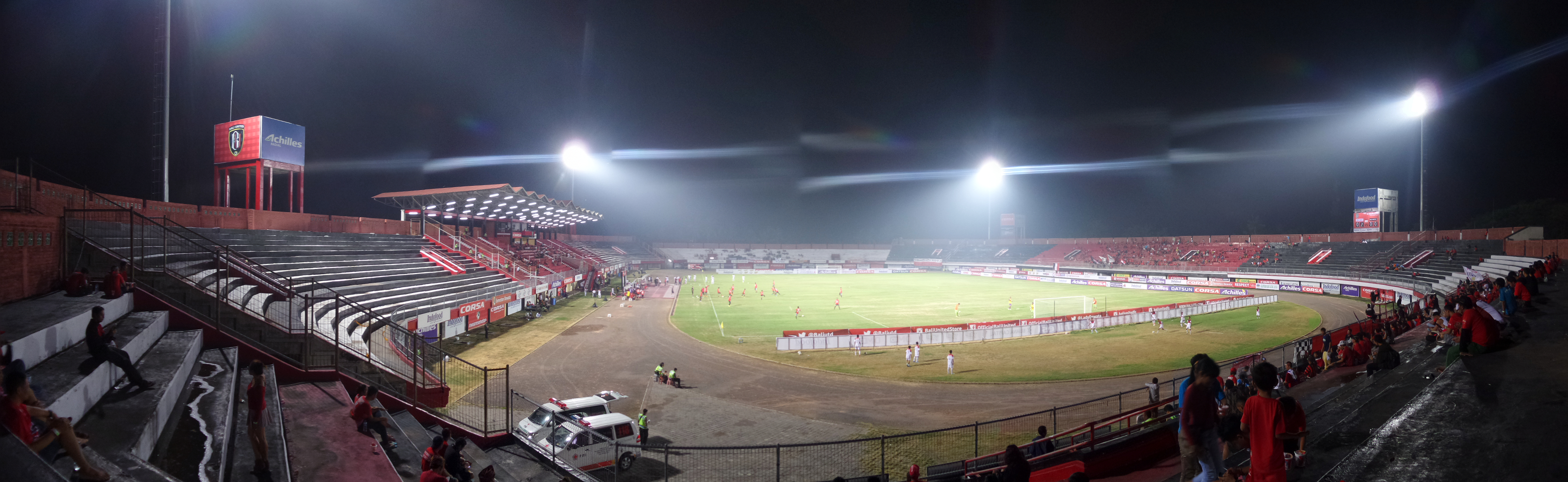
Panoramic view of the stadium, 2016.

Kapten I Wayan Dipta Stadium (Indonesian: Stadion Kapten I Wayan Dipta, Balinese script: ᬲ᭄ᬢᬤᬶᬬᭀᬦ᭄ᬓᬧ᭄ᬢᬾᬦ᭄ᬇᬯᬬᬦ᭄ᬤᬶᬧ᭄ᬢ), is a multi-purpose stadium in Gianyar Regency, Bali, Indonesia, and the home of Indonesia Liga 1 club Bali United. It has a capacity of 18,000 spectators.

== History ==
In 2014, Bali United played their home matches at Kapten I Wayan Dipta Stadium after moving their homebase from Samarinda to Bali. IDR 5 billion was spent to renovate the stadium by adding new lighting system, upgrading the dressing rooms, repainting some parts of the stadium, repairing the toilets as well as upgrading other facilities.

== Services and facilities ==
=== Bali United Store ===
Bali United Store is the official merchandise store of Bali United. The store opened to the public on 19 March 2016 and it is located at the bottom of the southern tribune of the stadium, precisely next to gate 5.

The merchandise store, which has been operating for approximately a year, was renovated by expanding the area of the store. On 9 June 2017, Vice Regent of Gianyar, Made Mahayastra, inaugurated Bali United merchandise store after being renovated. There is something that can be considered fresh after the renovation, which is the stage for the show meet and great the supporters with the players of Bali United.

=== LED Perimeter Board ===
Management of Bali United made a new breakthrough related to the appearance of Kapten I Wayan Dipta Stadium by installing LED perimeter board. CEO of Bali United, Yabes Tanuri said, the installation of LED perimeter board is intended to make the stadium view more interesting. In addition, he also mentioned that the installation of LED perimeter board aims to give local businessmen the opportunity to promote their business in Bali United.

The installation process of LED perimeter board was conducted on 12 October 2017 and started operation on 20 October 2017 during a home game against PS TNI.

=== Bali United Cafe ===
Bali United Cafe, was unveiled on 5 June 2018 by performing a melaspas ceremony (ceremony for new building in Bali). The cafe itself is located in the southwestern part of Kapten I Wayan Dipta Stadium or more precisely under the southern wing tribune. The visitors will be able to watch the Bali United match from inside Bali United Cafe. Bali United Cafe will operate daily from 11.00 to 23.00 Indonesia Central Standard Time. There is also a mini store located in the area of Bali United Cafe.

=== Bali United Playland ===
The management of Bali United also unveiled Bali United Playland together with the inauguration of Bali United Cafe. Bali United Playland is a play area for children that is comfortable and fun. Management wants to give comfort to the supporters who come to the stadium to bring the children.

== Expansions ==
Bali United did some renovations for Asian competition in 2018. Renovations included repairing and increasing the number of toilets as well as improving the lighting quality of the stadium lights. The current floodlights are 1,200 lux according to the standard of AFC.

In addition, management planned to increase the capacity of the stadium: 600 places for south wing tribune and 600 for south tribune. So there is a total addition of 1,200, bringing the total capacity to 26,200. Additional grandstand construction had been started since 3 November 2017 for the laying of the first stone. The process of adding the capacity of the tribune took approximately two and a half months and was to be completed early 2018. After adding seats to the East-Tribune the capacity is now 22,931.

After the stadium was chosen to be a venue for the 2021 FIFA U-20 World Cup, renovations work are expected to be done to the stadium. In early 2020, more seats are added to the stands as an effort to make the stadium an all-seater stadium that is suitable for the tournament.

== International matches hosted ==
Date	Competition	Team #1	Res.	Team #2	Attendance
15 October 2019	2022 FIFA World Cup Qualification	Indonesia	1–3	Vietnam	8,237
27 January 2022	Friendly	Indonesia	4–1	Timor-Leste	N/A
30 January 2022	Friendly	Timor-Leste	0–3	Indonesia	N/A
25 August 2024	Friendly U-17	Indonesia	3–1	India	N/A
27 August 2024	Friendly U-17	India	1–0	Indonesia	N/A
5 September 2024	2027 AFC Asian Cup qualification – play-off round	Timor-Leste	4–1	Mongolia	N/A
