= 2010–11 Indonesia Super League U-21 group stage =

The 2011 Indonesia Super League U-21 group stage matches took place between 19 January - 17 April 2011 for first group stage and between 26–30 April 2011 for second group stage.

== First round ==
Group winners and runners-up advanced to the second group stage.

=== Group 1 ===
| Pos | Team | Pld | W | D | L | GF | GA | GD | Pts |
|---|---|---|---|---|---|---|---|---|---|
| 1 | Persib U-21 (A) | 8 | 5 | 1 | 2 | 16 | 9 | +7 | 16 |
| 2 | Semen Padang U-21 (A) | 8 | 5 | 1 | 2 | 13 | 9 | +4 | 16 |
| 3 | PSPS U-21 | 8 | 2 | 3 | 3 | 7 | 6 | +1 | 9 |
| 4 | Persija U-21 | 8 | 1 | 4 | 3 | 6 | 11 | −5 | 7 |
| 5 | Sriwijaya FC U-21 | 8 | 2 | 1 | 5 | 10 | 17 | −7 | 7 |

Source: ISL U-21 Review and ISL U-21 Table
(A) Advanced to the second group stage
23 January 2011
15:30 (UTC+7)

| Persib U-21 | 2 – 1 | Semen Padang U-21 |
|---|---|---|
| Budiawan 13'; Asep A.H (yellow card) 43'; Rudi Geofani 46' | Report | 8' M. Sa'i Rahman; (yellow card) 13' Angga M.P; (yellow card) 36' Yosua Pahabol; (yellow card) 77' H.A. Yusa |

Siliwangi Stadium, Bandung
Attendance: 8,200
Referee: Olehadi

26 January 2011
13:00 (UTC+7)

| PSPS U-21 | 2 – 0 | Sriwijaya U-21 |
|---|---|---|
| Zulkhairi 5'; Jamilus Ardi (yellow card) 26'; Rio Tutrianto (yellow card) 60'; Budi Sukatmanto 78'; Dedi Putra (yellow card) 79' | Report | (yellow card) 67' Dere Halman |

Sport Center Stadium, Kuansing
Attendance: 2,245
Referee: Rorim Situmeang

29 January 2011
13:30 (UTC+7)

| Persija U-21 | 0 – 0 | Persib U-21 |
|---|---|---|
| Ade Fajar (yellow card) 13'; Arief Dwi (yellow card) 29'; Reza .M (yellow card) 83' | Report | (yellow card) 78' Asep A.H |

GMSB Stadium, Jakarta
Attendance: 400
Referee: Rorim Situmeang

30 January 2011
12:30 (UTC+7)

| Semen Padang U-21 | 0 – 0 | PSPS U-21 |
|---|---|---|
| M. Sa'i Rahman (yellow card) 44'; Arifan F.M (yellow card) 83' | Report | (yellow card) 56' Cecep Arifin |

H. Agus Salim Stadium, Padang
Attendance: 100
Referee: M. Safei

4 February 2011
15:30 (UTC+7)

| PSPS U-21 | 1 – 1 | Persija U-21 |
|---|---|---|
| Tengku Lutfi 19' (pen.) | Report | 21' Tri Johan; (yellow card) 45' Delton .S; (yellow card) 75' Ade Wahyudi |

Sport Center Stadium, Kuansing
Attendance: 276
Referee: Rorim Situmeang

6 February 2011
08:30 (UTC+7)

| Sriwijaya U-21 | 4 – 1 | Semen Padang U-21 |
|---|---|---|
| Yusuf Efendi (yellow card) 4'; Dere Halman (yellow card) 29'; Rizsky Dwi 40'; Bayu Pujasuma 43'; Yusuf Efendi 63'; Al Firzon 77' | Report | (yellow card) 73' Doni A.P; 76' Doni A.P; (yellow card) 82' Angga M.P |

Bumi Sriwijaya Stadium, Palembang
Attendance: 513
Referee: Sulistyoko

9 February 2011
13:00 (UTC+7)

| Persib U-21 | 2 – 1 | PSPS U-21 |
|---|---|---|
| Irpan Setiawan 70'; Erwin Ramdani 81' | Report | 31' Joy; (yellow card) 72' M. Al'Asyari; (yellow card) 76' Jamilus Ardi |

Siliwangi Stadium, Bandung
Attendance: 0
Referee: Maslah Iksan

11 February 2011
15:30 (UTC+7)

| Persija U-21 | 2 – 1 | Sriwijaya U-21 |
|---|---|---|
| Reza .M 45', 59' | Report | (yellow card) 11' Ibnu Guntoro; (yellow card) 32' M. Yusuf; 44' Rizsky Dwi |

GMSB Stadium, Jakarta
Attendance: 300
Referee: Hamsir

16 February 2011
08:30 (UTC+7)

| Sriwijaya U-21 | 1 – 4 | Persib U-21 |
|---|---|---|
| Jeki Arisandi (yellow card) 47'; Bayu Pujasuma (yellow card) 60'; Bayu Pujasuma (red card) 73'; Rizsky Dwi 90' | Report | 6', 15' Erwin Ramdani; 34' Ana Supriatna; (yellow card) 58' Anggi Indra; 75' Suhandi; (yellow card) 87' Rudi Geofani |

Jakabaring Stadium, Palembang
Attendance: 251
Referee: Sulistyoko
16 February 2011
15:30 (UTC+7)

| Semen Padang U-21 | 2 – 0 | Persija U-21 |
|---|---|---|
| Andika Putra 4'; Anggi Topano (yellow card) 33'; Yosua Pahabol 44' | Report | (yellow card) 16' Juan Rifandi; (yellow card) 22' Ade Fajar |

H. Agus Salim Stadium, Padang
Attendance: 391
Referee: Maslah Iksan

5 March 2011
15:00 (UTC+7)

| Semen Padang U-21 | 3 – 1 | Sriwijaya U-21 |
|---|---|---|
| Yosua Pahabol 8', 67'; J.C. Itaar (yellow card) 32'; Eka Putra 46'; Andika Putra (yellow card) 87' | Report | 6' Rachmad Ramadhan; (yellow card) 7' Dere Halman |

H. Agus Salim Stadium, Padang
Attendance: 511
Referee: Maslah Iksan

13 March 2011
13:30 (UTC+7)

| Persija U-21 | 1 – 2 | Semen Padang U-21 |
|---|---|---|
| Tri Johan (yellow card) 37'; Angga (yellow card) 79'; Walid Anshori (yellow card) 79'; Rendy .A 85'; Juan Rifandi (yellow card) 50' (yellow-red card) 86' | Report | 17' Andi Rizky; 26' Yosua Pahabol; (yellow card) 39' Angga Pratama; (yellow card) 63' J.C. Itaar; (yellow card) 37' (yellow-red card) 71' Andika Putra |

GMSB Stadium, Jakarta
Attendance: 800
Referee: Abdul Malik

18 March 2011
08:30 (UTC+7)

| Persib U-21 | 3 – 0 | Sriwijaya U-21 |
|---|---|---|
| Johan Yoga 28'; Suhandi 62'; Budiawan 66' | Report | (red card) 20' Rezha Fahlevi; (yellow card) 87' Catur Dwi |

Jalak Harupat Stadium, Bandung
Attendance: 0
Referee: Abdul Malik

19 March 2011
13:00 (UTC+7)

| PSPS U-21 | 0 – 1 | Semen Padang U-21 |
|---|---|---|
| M. Al'syari (yellow card) 35'; Rian Domanik (yellow card) 45' | Report | (yellow card) 57' Anggi Topano; 80' Yosua Pahabol |

Rumbai Stadium, Pekanbaru
Attendance: 535
Referee: Rorim Situmeang

23 March 2011
08:00 (UTC+7)

| Sriwijaya U-21 | 1 – 1 | Persija U-21 |
|---|---|---|
| M. Yusuf (yellow card) 39'; Rizsky Dwi 88' | Report | 87' Reza .M |

Bumi Sriwijaya Stadium, Palembang
Attendance: 0
Referee: Mulyadi

27 March 2011
10:00 (UTC+7)

| Persib U-21 | 4 – 1 | Persija U-21 |
|---|---|---|
| Rudi Geofani 11', 45'; Johan Yoga 20'; Ana Supriatna (yellow card) 41'; Anggi Indra 46'; Ana Supriatna 80' | Report | (yellow card) 67' Tri Johan; (yellow card) 68' Ivan Hardiyanto; 90' Rendy .A |

Jalak Harupat Stadium, Bandung
Attendance: 0
Referee: Joni Parera

3 April 2011
13:30 (UTC+7)

| Persija U-21 | 0 – 0 | PSPS U-21 |
|---|---|---|
| Reza .M (yellow card) 39' | Report | (yellow card) 41' Andri Kurniawan; (yellow card) 72' Tengku Lutfi |

GMSB Stadium, Jakarta
Attendance: 200
Referee: Khusnul Yaqin

8 April 2011
08:30 (UTC+7)

| PSPS U-21 | 2 – 0 | Persib U-21 |
|---|---|---|
| Dika Hanggara 7'; Sapri Koto 27'; Rio Tutrianto (yellow card) 63' | Report | (yellow card) 32' Rudiyana |

H. Agus Salim Stadium, Padang
Attendance: 500
Referee: Jimmy Napitupulu

12 April 2011
08:15 (UTC+7)

| Semen Padang U-21 | 3 – 1 | Persib U-21 |
|---|---|---|
| Satria Eka 2', 4', 26'; Wahyu Firnanda (yellow card) 27'; Robertho Sogrim (yellow card) 28'; J.C. Itaar (yellow card) 58'; Satria Eka (yellow card) 74' (yellow-red card) 76' | Report | 62' Rully Salim; (yellow card) 77' Ana Supriatna |

H. Agus Salim Stadium, Padang
Attendance: 53
Referee: Rorim Situmeang

17 April 2011
08:30 (UTC+7)

| Sriwijaya U-21 | 2 – 1 | PSPS U-21 |
|---|---|---|
| Rizky Muhendry (yellow card) 36'; Jeki Arisandi 50'; Yusuf Efendi (yellow card) 27'; Heru Ganesha 28' | Report | 62' Zulkhairi Amami |

Bumi Sriwijaya Stadium, Palembang
Attendance: 312
Referee: Mulyadi

=== Group 2 ===
| Pos | Team | Pld | W | D | L | GF | GA | GD | Pts |
|---|---|---|---|---|---|---|---|---|---|
| 1 | Pelita Jaya U-21 (A) | 8 | 5 | 1 | 2 | 14 | 6 | +8 | 16 |
| 2 | Persela U-21 (A) | 8 | 5 | 0 | 3 | 15 | 8 | +7 | 15 |
| 3 | Arema FC U-21 | 8 | 5 | 0 | 3 | 11 | 10 | +1 | 15 |
| 4 | Deltras Sidoarjo U-21 | 8 | 4 | 0 | 4 | 13 | 13 | 0 | 12 |
| 5 | Persijap U-21 | 8 | 0 | 1 | 7 | 3 | 19 | −16 | 1 |

Source: ISL U-21 Review and ISL U-21 Table
(A) Advanced to the second group stage
19 January 2011
19:00 (UTC+7)

| Persijap U-21 | 0 – 0 | Pelita Jaya U-21 |
|---|---|---|
| Moch. Choirudin (yellow card) 45' | Report | (yellow card) 55' Saripulloh; (yellow card) 67' Dwi Okta; (yellow card) 73' Feriansyah |

GBK Stadium, Jepara
Attendance: 150
Referee: Hamsir
19 January 2011
19:00 (UTC+7)

| Arema U-21 | 2 – 1 | Persela U-21 |
|---|---|---|
| Fatchur Rohman 13'; Sunarto 35'; Sunarto (yellow card) 42' | Report | 4' Fandi Eko; (yellow card) 33' Eky Taufik; (yellow card) 68' Agung Fitrayanto |

Kanjuruhan Stadium, Malang
Attendance: 650
Referee: Ahmad Suparman

24 January 2011
15:30 (UTC+7)

| Persela U-21 | 2 – 0 | Persijap U-21 |
|---|---|---|
| Fandi Eko 11'; Fandi Eko (yellow card) 58'; M. Nasrulloh 71'; M. Nasrulloh (yellow card) 89' | Report | (yellow card) 43' Sulis Triyono; (yellow card) 56' Ahmad Buchori |

Surajaya Stadium, Lamongan
Attendance: 200
Referee: Hamsir

29 January 2011
08:00 (UTC+7)

| Deltras U-21 | 2 – 1 | Arema U-21 |
|---|---|---|
| Dave Mustaine 69'; Ahmad H.S 71' | Report | 47' Luxi Ariawan; (yellow card) 81' Sunarto |

Gelora Delta Stadium, Sidoarjo
Attendance: 123
Referee: Sulistyoko

30 January 2011
15:25 (UTC+7)

| Pelita Jaya U-21 | 1 – 3 | Persela U-21 |
|---|---|---|
| Riyandi Putra 11' | Report | (yellow card) 41' Ryco Fernanda; 45' Ryco Fernanda; 50' Sutrisno; 66' Rudy Santoso |

Singaperbangsa Stadium, Karawang
Attendance: 1,127
Referee: Joni Parera

2 February 2011
15:30 (UTC+7)

| Persijap U-21 | 2 – 3 | Deltras U-21 |
|---|---|---|
| Abdul Latif 18'; M. Alex Fatoni (yellow card) 64'; Abdul Latif (yellow card) 70'; Alex Fauzi 75' | Report | 22' Dwi Aryo; 71', 73' Ahmad H.S; (yellow card) 89' Ahmad H.S |

GBK Stadium, Jepara
Attendance: 100
Referee: Saripudin

7 February 2011
15:30 (UTC+7)

| Arema U-21 | 1 – 0 | Persijap U-21 |
|---|---|---|
| Fatchur Rohman (yellow card) 7'; Gilang D.P (yellow card) 62'; Dicho Chorniawan 84'; Luxi Ariawan (yellow card) 87' | Report | (yellow card) 40' Andi Supriyanto; (yellow card) 45' Efendi Junianto; (yellow card) 58' M. Akhsan; (yellow card) 75' Ahmad Buchori |

Kanjuruhan Stadium, Malang
Attendance: 157
Referee: Jerry Elly

8 February 2011
15:30 (UTC+7)

| Deltras U-21 | 0 – 1 | Pelita Jaya U-21 |
|---|---|---|
| | Report | 83' Afriansyah |

Gelora Delta Stadium, Sidoarjo
Attendance: 300
Referee: Abdul Malik

13 February 2011
15:30 (UTC+7)

| Persela U-21 | 2 – 1 | Deltras U-21 |
|---|---|---|
| Fandi Eko 50', 89' | Report | (yellow card) 37' Dwi Aryo; (yellow card) 63' Yoga Wahyu; 86' Fatchur R.S |

Surajaya Stadium, Lamongan
Attendance: 0
Referee: Retu Slamet Wijaya
13 February 2011
15:30 (UTC+7)

| Pelita Jaya U-21 | 3 – 0 | Arema U-21 |
|---|---|---|
| Afrian C.P (yellow card) 62'; Riyandi Putra 65'; Saripulloh (yellow card) 69'; Afriansyah 82', 90'; M. Syukron (yellow card) 87' | Report |

Singaperbangsa Stadium, Karawang
Attendance: 527
Referee: Sulistyoko

6 March 2011
19:00 (UTC+7)

| Deltras U-21 | 2 – 1 | Persela U-21 |
|---|---|---|
| Dwi Aryo 30'; Ahmad H.S 36'; Egi Wahyu (yellow card) 38'; Agung Setiawan (yellow card) 70' | Report | 16' Fandi Eko; (yellow card) 55' Galih Rangga; (yellow card) 82' M. Radikal |

Gelora Delta Stadium, Sidoarjo
Attendance: 1,000
Referee: Sulistyoko

12 March 2011
15:30 (UTC+7)

| Pelita Jaya U-21 | 2 – 1 | Deltras U-21 |
|---|---|---|
| Asep Berlian (yellow card) 74'; M. Syukron (yellow card) 86'; Asep Budi (yellow card) 90' | Report | (yellow card) 16' Yoga Wahyu; (yellow card) 86' Ahmad Setiawan; 90' Dave Mustaine |

Singaperbangsa Stadium, Karawang
Attendance: 300
Referee: Hamsir

22 March 2011
19:00 (UTC+7)

| Persijap U-21 | 0 – 1 | Arema U-21 |
|---|---|---|
| Fendy (yellow card) 30' | Report | (yellow card) 19' Darmawan; 90' Fatchur Rohman; (yellow card) 28' (yellow-red card) 89' Dedik Priyo |

GBK Stadium, Jepara
Attendance: 500
Referee: Najamuddin Aspiran

27 March 2011
18:30 (UTC+7)

| Arema U-21 | 2 – 1 | Pelita Jaya U-21 |
|---|---|---|
| Fatchur Rohman 29', 47'; Darmawan (red card) 45'; Aji Saka (yellow card) 90' | Report | (yellow card) 45' Riyandi Putra; (red card) 45' Ibnu Adzam; (yellow card) 67' (goal) 71' Afriansyah; (yellow card) 86' Saripulloh |

Kanjuruhan Stadium, Malang
Attendance: 215
Referee: Hamsir

1 April 2011
18:30 (UTC+7)

| Arema U-21 | 4 – 0 | Deltras U-21 |
|---|---|---|
| Ribut Wahyudi 3', 15'; Gilang D.P (yellow card) 41'; Ribut Wahyudi (yellow card) 42'; Fatchur Rohman 50'; Gilang D.P 81' | Report | (yellow card) 26' Moch. Farid; (yellow card) 40' M. Bagus Nurwaanto; (yellow card) 85' Dave Mustaine |

Kanjuruhan Stadium, Malang
Attendance: 206
Referee: Olehadi

2 April 2011
19:00 (UTC+7)

| Persela U-21 | 0 – 1 | Pelita Jaya U-21 |
|---|---|---|
| Rian Bayu (yellow card) 27'; Eky Taufik (yellow card) 55' | Report | 35' Afriansyah; (yellow card) 77' Asep Berlian; (yellow card) 87' Shahar Ginanjar |

Surajaya Stadium, Lamongan
Attendance: 101
Referee: Joni Parera

7 April 2011
19:00 (UTC+7)

| Persijap U-21 | 1 – 3 | Persela U-21 |
|---|---|---|
| Andi Supriyanto 15'; Alex Fauzi (yellow card) 39'; Moch. Choirudin (yellow card) 72'; M. Alex Fatoni (yellow card) 89' | Report | 35' Sutrisno .H.K; 45', 70' Rudy Santoso; (yellow card) 76' Ryco Fernanda |

GBK Stadium, Jepara
Attendance: 225
Referee: Sulistyoko

13 April 2011
15:30 (UTC+7)

| Deltras U-21 | 4 – 0 | Persijap U-21 |
|---|---|---|
| Faisal Muttaqin 47'; Dave Mustaine 53' (pen.); Ahmad Setiawan 65'; Agung Setiawan (yellow card) 69'; M. Bagus Nurwaanto (yellow card) 71'; M. Nasrul Hidayah 74' (pen.) | Report | (yellow card) 33' Efendi Junianto; (yellow card) 67' Teguh wibowo (yellow card) 71' M. Afif Fahrudi; (yellow card) 72' Ahmad Fa Izin; (yellow card) 80' Muhammad Sapuan |

Gelora Delta Stadium, Sidoarjo
Attendance: 200
Referee: M. Safei

17 April 2011
15:30 (UTC+7)

| Pelita Jaya U-21 | 4 – 0 | Persijap U-21 |
|---|---|---|
| Afrian Candra 4'; Afriansyah 16', 32' (pen.); Jhoni Arif 40'; Muhamad Darusman (yellow card) 70'; Ibnu Adzam 87' | Report | (yellow card) 33' Tommy Veriyanto |

Singaperbangsa Stadium, Karawang
Attendance: 600
Referee: Maslah Iksan
17 April 2011
15:00 (UTC+7)

| Persela U-21 | 3 – 0 | Arema FC U-21 |
|---|---|---|
| M. Radikal (yellow card) 48'; Fandi Eko 57'; Rudy Santoso 64', 73' | Report | (yellow card) 36' Galih Rajasa; (yellow card) 47' Zainal Solli; (yellow card) 55' Dedik Priyo |

Surajaya Stadium, Lamongan
Attendance: 2,252
Referee: Ahmad Suparman

=== Group 3 ===
| Pos | Team | Pld | W | D | L | GF | GA | GD | Pts |
|---|---|---|---|---|---|---|---|---|---|
| 1 | Persisam Putra U-21 (A) | 8 | 6 | 0 | 2 | 25 | 11 | +14 | 18 |
| 2 | Persiwa U-21 (A) | 8 | 5 | 0 | 3 | 11 | 12 | −1 | 15 |
| 3 | Persipura U-21 | 8 | 4 | 2 | 2 | 9 | 7 | +2 | 14 |
| 4 | Bontang FC U-21 | 8 | 2 | 1 | 5 | 9 | 18 | −9 | 7 |
| 5 | Persiba U-21 | 8 | 0 | 3 | 5 | 3 | 9 | −6 | 3 |

Source: ISL U-21 Review and ISL U-21 Table
(A) Advanced to the second group stage
20 January 2011
15:30 (UTC+9)

| Persiwa U-21 | 1 – 0 | Persiba U-21 |
|---|---|---|
| Ferinando 53'; Ferinando (yellow card) 83' | Report | (yellow card) 37' Asman |

Pendidikan Stadium, Wamena
Attendance: 1,200
Referee: Khusnul Yaqin

23 January 2011
20:00 (UTC+8)

| Persisam U-21 | 4 – 3 | Bontang U-21 |
|---|---|---|
| Loudry M.S 13'; Radiansyah 22' (pen.); Aldeir Makatindu 30'; Imam Bayhaqi 89' | Report | (yellow card) 2' Anderson; (yellow card) 39' Hendra L.M; 64', 70' Arnoldy Polii; 72' Toni Iswanto; (yellow card) 78' Idul Hakim |

Segiri Stadium, Samarinda
Attendance: 1,328
Referee: Joni Parera

25 January 2011
18:30 (UTC+9)

| Persipura U-21 | 0 – 0 | Persiba U-21 |
|---|---|---|
| Hendrik Rewang (yellow card) 54'; Daniel Tata (yellow card) 61'; S.Y Matui (yellow card) 90' | Report | (yellow card) 19' (yellow-red card) 59' Achmad Rahmadhan; (yellow card) 82' M. Husain |

Mandala Stadium, Jayapura
Attendance: 215
Referee: Djumadi Effendi

30 January 2011
15:30 (UTC+9)

| Persiwa U-21 | 4 – 1 | Persipura U-21 |
|---|---|---|
| Ferinando 41', 66', 74'; F.X. Mumpo 52'; Ferinando (yellow card) 75'; F.R. Mabel (yellow card) 85' | Report | 84' Ravel Ohee; (yellow card) 84' Leonardo |

Pendidikan Stadium, Wamena
Attendance: 532
Referee: Anselmus

2 February 2011
19:30 (UTC+8)

| Persiba U-21 | 1 – 2 | Persisam U-21 |
|---|---|---|
| M. Husain (yellow card) 73'; Rusmin Nuryadin 81' (pen.) | Report | 46' Aldeir Makatindu; 51' Loudry M.S; (yellow card) 56' M. Arsyad |

Persiba Stadium, Balikpapan
Attendance: 750
Referee: Joni Parera

5 February 2011
15:30 (UTC+8)

| Persiba U-21 | 1 – 1 | Bontang U-21 |
|---|---|---|
| Eko Syam (yellow card) 41'; Asman (yellow card) 67'; Suryadi 76'; Hafiz Romdani (yellow card) 77' | Report | (yellow card) 14' Asri; 90' Arifuddin Ansar; (yellow card) 90' Arifuddin Ansar |

Persiba Stadium, Balikpapan
Attendance: 315
Referee: Djumadi Effendi

10 February 2011
16:30 (UTC+8)

| Bontang U-21 | 1 – 0 | Persiwa U-21 |
|---|---|---|
| Arnoldy Polii 54' | Report | (yellow card) 78' Frenky Kosay |

Mulawarman Stadium, Bontang
Attendance: 100
Referee: Djumadi Effendi
10 February 2011
19:00 (UTC+8)

| Persisam U-21 | 1 – 2 | Persipura U-21 |
|---|---|---|
| M. Nur Yassin (yellow card) 24'; Lingga (yellow card) 28'; M. Arsyad (yellow card) 55'; Dendi Sembiring 79' | Report | (yellow card) 36' Daniel Tata; (yellow card) 44' Tison Dimara; 47' (pen.) Gilbert; 82' Felix Meraudje |

Segiri Stadium, Samarinda
Attendance: 1,279
Referee: Khusnul Yaqin

13 February 2011
15:30 (UTC+8)

| Bontang U-21 | 1 – 2 | Persipura U-21 |
|---|---|---|
| Nur Aidil 25'; Anderson (yellow card) 34'; Hendra L.M (yellow card) 66'; Ikhwal (yellow card) 75'; R.A. Ariansyah (yellow card) 90' | Report | 17' Gilbert; 23' Marthen Karafir; (yellow card) 55' Yermia Matui; (yellow card) 87' Marthen Karafir; (red card) 88' Gilbert |

Mulawarman Stadium, Bontang
Attendance: 300
Referee: M. Safei
13 February 2011
19:00 (UTC+8)

| Persisam U-21 | 9 – 1 | Persiwa U-21 |
|---|---|---|
| Aldeir 6', 21', 45' (pen.), 57'; Radiansyah 12', 84'; Adi Sucipto 32'; Imam Bayhaqi 37'; Loudry M.S 87' | Report | (yellow card) 42' Usa Laksono; (yellow card) 64' Frenky Kosay; (yellow card) 80' F.R. Mabel; 89' Robert Huby |

Segiri Stadium, Samarinda
Attendance: 1,549
Referee: Saripudin

7 March 2011
15:30 (UTC+9)

| Persiwa U-21 | 1 – 0 | Persisam U-21 |
|---|---|---|
| Usa Laksono (yellow card) 18'; Yuni Daren 70' | Report |

Pendidikan Stadium, Wamena
Attendance: 239
Referee: Suharto
7 March 2011
18:30 (UTC+9)

| Persipura U-21 | 3 – 0 (w.o) | Bontang U-21 |
|---|---|---|
| | Report |

Mandala Stadium, Jayapura
Attendance: 458
Referee: Olehadi

10 March 2011
15:30 (UTC+9)

| Persiwa U-21 | 3 – 0 (w.o) | Bontang U-21 |
|---|---|---|
| | Report |

Pendidikan Stadium, Wamena
Attendance: 150
Referee: Saripudin
10 March 2011
18:30 (UTC+9)

| Persipura U-21 | 0 – 1 | Persisam U-21 |
|---|---|---|
| | Report | 70' Aldeir Makatindu |

Mandala Stadium, Jayapura
Attendance: 482
Referee: Mardi

23 March 2011
16:30 (UTC+8)

| Persisam U-21 | 3 – 1 | Persiba U-21 |
|---|---|---|
| Imam Baihaqi 53'; Ahmad Fadeli 65'; Adi Sucipto 68'; Dendi Sembiring (yellow card) 89' | Report | 12' Suryadi; (yellow card) 45' Yudi Asmawanto; (yellow card) 81' Reski |

Segiri Stadium, Samarinda
Attendance: 1,326
Referee: M. Safei

26 March 2011
19:00 (UTC+8)

| Bontang U-21 | 1 – 0 | Persiba U-21 |
|---|---|---|
| Stefano Manangka (yellow card) 22'; Imran Nur (yellow card) 65'; R.A. Ariansyah 89' | Report | (yellow card) 40' (yellow-red card) 64' Muh. Husain |

Mulawarman Stadium, Bontang
Attendance: 100
Referee: Khusnul Yaqin

3 April 2011
15:30 (UTC+9)

| Persipura U-21 | 1 – 0 | Persiwa U-21 |
|---|---|---|
| Mucklis Haay (yellow card) 68'; Felix Maraudjo (yellow card) 72'; Leonardo 76'; Leonardo (yellow card) 76' | Report | (yellow card) 27' Vicky Pahabol; (yellow card) 68' Frenky Kosay |

Mandala Stadium, Jayapura
Attendance: 183
Referee: Saripudin

13 April 2011
16:00 (UTC+8)

| Persiba U-21 | 0 – 0 | Persipura U-21 |
|---|---|---|
| Awal Ramadhan (yellow card) 57'; Suryadi (yellow card) 64'; Achmad Setiawan (yellow card) 90' | Report | (yellow card) 25' Rizad Rahakbauw; (yellow card) 47' Tison Dimara |

Persiba Stadium, Balikpapan
Attendance: 250
Referee: Mulyadi

17 April 2011
15:30 (UTC+8)

| Persiba U-21 | 0 – 1 | Persiwa U-21 |
|---|---|---|
| Achmad Rahmadhan (red card) 40'; Hari Prayogi (yellow card) 58'; Achmad Setiawan (yellow card) 65' | Report | (yellow card) 30' Robert Huby; (red card) 40' Feri Pahabol; (yellow card) 59' Frenky Kosay; 83' Robert Huby |

Persiba Stadium, Balikpapan
Attendance: 2,312
Referee: Olehadi
17 April 2011
19:00 (UTC+8)

| Bontang U-21 | 2 – 5 | Persisam U-21 |
|---|---|---|
| Ardian 10'; Anderson (yellow card) 17'; Ardian (yellow card) 17'; Gusti Rifani 50'; Rachamad Ajens Ariamsyah (yellow card) 54'; Idul Hakim (yellow card) 72' | Report | 15', 84', 89' Radiansyah; (yellow card) 28' Ferdy Juan; (yellow card) 43' Imam Bayhaki; (yellow card) 61' Ismail Marzuki; (yellow card) 77' Lingga Pratama; (yellow card) 79' Dendi Sembiring |

Mulawarman Stadium, Bontang
Attendance: 100
Referee: M. Safei

== Second round ==
All match play in Soemantri Brodjonegoro Stadium. The draw for this Round took place on 21 April 2011 with ties to be played on the weekend of 26–30 April 2011. Group winners and runners-up advanced to the knockout round.

=== Group A ===
| Pos | Team | Pld | W | D | L | GF | GA | GD | Pts |
|---|---|---|---|---|---|---|---|---|---|
| 1 | Persisam U-21 (A) | 2 | 1 | 1 | 0 | 3 | 1 | +2 | 4 |
| 2 | Persela U-21 (A) | 2 | 0 | 2 | 0 | 2 | 2 | 0 | 2 |
| 3 | Persib U-21 | 2 | 0 | 1 | 1 | 1 | 3 | −2 | 1 |

Source: ISL U-21 Review and ISL U-21 Table
(A) Advanced to the knockout round
26 April 2011
15:30 (UTC+7)

| Persib U-21 | 1 – 1 | Persela U-21 |
|---|---|---|
| Erwin Ramdani (yellow card) 20'; Rudi Geofani (yellow card) 31'; Suhandi (yellow card) 36'; Rudiyana 90' | Report | 12' M.B. Sabily; (yellow card) 12' M.B. Sabily; (yellow card) 34' Galih Rangga |

Soemantri Brodjonegoro Stadium, Jakarta
Attendance: 0
Referee: Armando Pribadi

28 April 2011
19:00 (UTC+7)

| Persela U-21 | 1 – 1 | Persisam U-21 |
|---|---|---|
| Agung Fitrayanto (yellow card) 15'; Agung Fitrayanto 45' (pen.); Sutrisno Hardi (yellow card) 55'; Ryco Fernanda (yellow card) 57' (yellow-red card) 73' | (Report) | 2' Radiansyah; (yellow card) 34' Muh. Zainal; (yellow card) 83' Wahyu Kristanto; (yellow card) 90' Adi Sucipto |

Soemantri Brodjonegoro Stadium, Jakarta
Attendance: 0
Referee: Olehadi

30 April 2011
15:30 (UTC+9)

| Persisam U-21 | 2 – 0 | Persib U-21 |
|---|---|---|
| Wahyu Kristanto (yellow card) 50'; Imam Bayhaqi 72'; Loudry Meilana (yellow card) 78'; Aldeir Makatindu 82'; Radiansyah (yellow card) 90' | (Report) | (yellow card) 78' (yellow-red card) 90' Ana Supriatna |

Soemantri Brodjonegoro Stadium, Jakarta
Attendance: 0
Referee: Joni Parera

=== Group B ===
| Pos | Team | Pld | W | D | L | GF | GA | GD | Pts |
|---|---|---|---|---|---|---|---|---|---|
| 1 | Persiwa U-21 (A) | 2 | 1 | 1 | 0 | 2 | 1 | +1 | 4 |
| 2 | Semen Padang U-21 (A) | 2 | 1 | 1 | 0 | 2 | 1 | +1 | 4 |
| 3 | Pelita Jaya U-21 | 2 | 0 | 0 | 2 | 0 | 2 | −2 | 0 |

Source: ISL U-21 Review and ISL U-21 Table
(A) Advanced to the knockout round
26 April 2011
19:00 (UTC+7)

| Semen Padang U-21 | 1 – 1 | Persiwa U-21 |
|---|---|---|
| Yosua Pahabol 50'; Anggi Topano (yellow card) 52' | Report | 14' F.X. Mumpo; (yellow card) 73' Robert Elopere; (yellow card) 77' Alan Aronggear |

Soemantri Brodjonegoro Stadium, Jakarta
Attendance: 0
Referee: Sulistyoko

28 April 2011
15:30 (UTC+7)

| Persiwa U-21 | 1 – 0 | Pelita Jaya U-21 |
|---|---|---|
| Feri Pahabol 51'; Jeverson Aud (yellow card) 79' | (Report) | (yellow card) 76' Jhoni Arif |

Soemantri Brodjonegoro Stadium, Jakarta
Attendance: 0
Referee: Joni Parera

30 April 2011
19:00 (UTC+7)

| Pelita Jaya U-21 | 0 – 1 | Semen Padang U-21 |
|---|---|---|
| Asep Berlian (yellow card) 67' | (Report) | (yellow card) 7' Arifan Fitra; (yellow card) 40' Satria Eka; (yellow card) 63' Yosua Pahabol; 77' Robertho Sogrim |

Soemantri Brodjonegoro Stadium, Jakarta
Attendance: 100
Referee: Olehadi
