= 2010 Indonesia Super League U-21 Final =

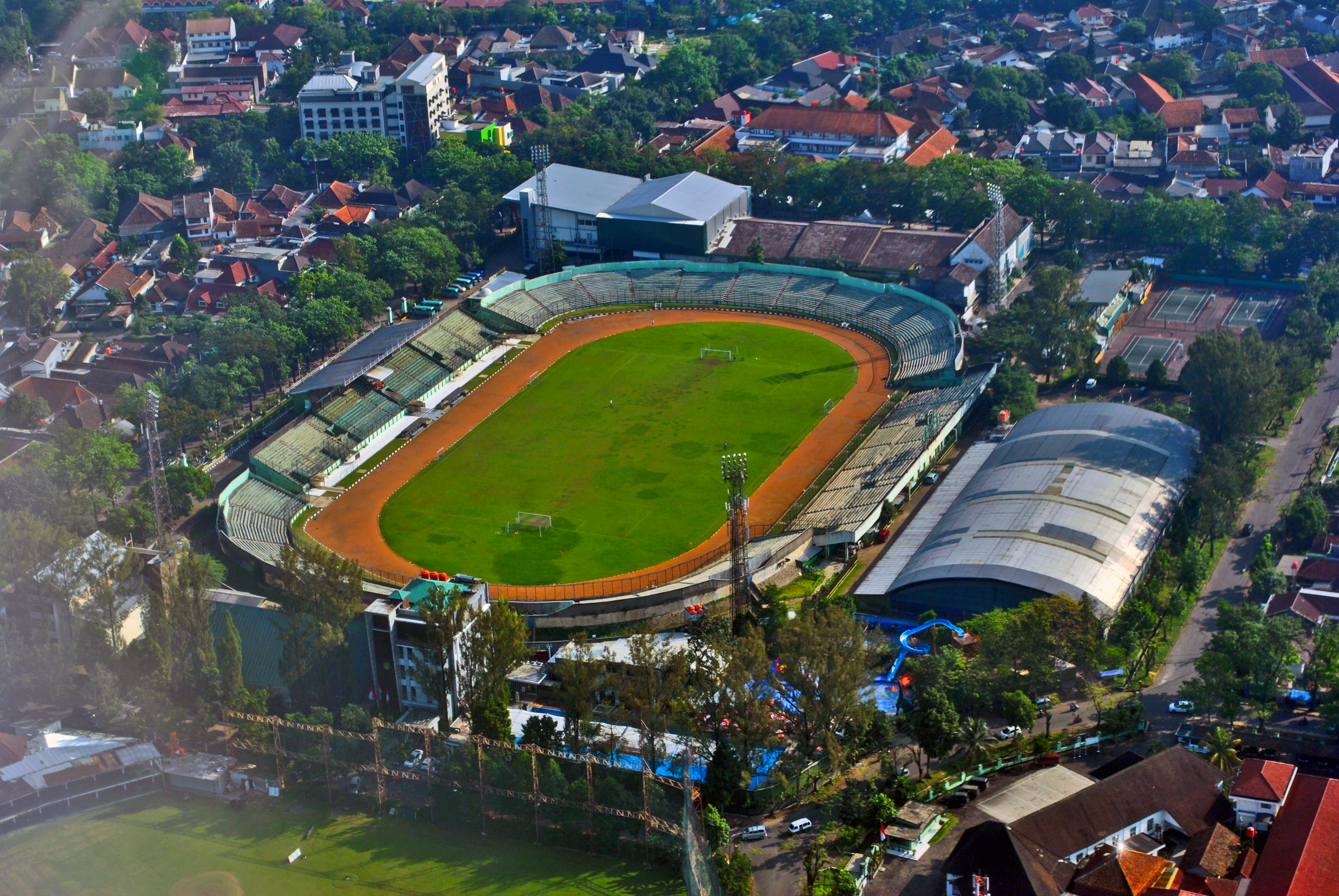
- Event: 2009-10 Indonesia Super League U-21
Persib U-21	Pelita Jaya U-21
(Indonesia)	(Indonesia)
2	0
- Date: 16 May 2010
- Venue: Siliwangi Stadium, Bandung
- ISL U-21 Man of the Match: Munadi (Persib U-21)
- Referee: Djumadi Effendi (Indonesia)
- Attendance: 3,000
- Weather: Rainy

The 2009–10 Indonesia Super League U-21 Final was a football match which was played on Sunday, 16 May 2010. It was the 2nd final of the Indonesia Super League U-21. The match was played at the Siliwangi Stadium in Bandung and was contested by Persib U-21 of Bandung and Pelita Jaya U-21 from Karawang. For Pelita U-21 this was the second appearance in the final of the ISL U-21 tournament, after consecutive Indonesia Super League U-21 final in 2008-09, with one trophy been won in 2009. Persib U-21 was a debutant of the final stage.

== Road to Bandung ==
Persib Bandung U-21			Round	Pelita Jaya U-21		
Main article: 2009–10 Indonesia Super League U-21 first group stage: Group A: Rank / Team / Pld / W / D / L / GF / GA / GD / Pts; 1 / Pelita Jaya U-21 / 10 / 8 / 0 / 2 / 27 / 13 / +14 / 24; 2 / Persib U-21 / 10 / 6 / 1 / 3 / 18 / 8 / +10 / 19; 3 / Sriwijaya FC U-21 / 10 / 4 / 2 / 4 / 12 / 10 / +2 / 14; 4 / PSPS U-21 / 10 / 4 / 1 / 5 / 12 / 22 / -10 / 13; 5 / Persitara U-21 / 10 / 2 / 2 / 6 / 12 / 19 / -7 / 8; 6 / Persija U-21 / 10 / 2 / 2 / 6 / 9 / 18 / -9 / 8			First Group stage	Main article: 2009–10 Indonesia Super League U-21 first group stage: Group A: Rank / Team / Pld / W / D / L / GF / GA / GD / Pts; 1 / Pelita Jaya U-21 / 10 / 8 / 0 / 2 / 27 / 13 / +14 / 24; 2 / Persib U-21 / 10 / 6 / 1 / 3 / 18 / 8 / +10 / 19; 3 / Sriwijaya FC U-21 / 10 / 4 / 2 / 4 / 12 / 10 / +2 / 14; 4 / PSPS U-21 / 10 / 4 / 1 / 5 / 12 / 22 / -10 / 13; 5 / Persitara U-21 / 10 / 2 / 2 / 6 / 12 / 19 / -7 / 8; 6 / Persija U-21 / 10 / 2 / 2 / 6 / 9 / 18 / -9 / 8		
Main article: 2009–10 Indonesia Super League U-21 second group stage: Group M: Rank / Team / Pld / W / D / L / GF / GA / GD / Pts; 1 / Persib U-21 / 2 / 2 / 0 / 0 / 5 / 1 / +4 / 6; 2 / Persipura U-21 / 2 / 1 / 0 / 1 / 3 / 4 / -1 / 3; 3 / Persik U-21 / 2 / 0 / 0 / 2 / 1 / 4 / 0 / 0			Second Group stage	Main article: 2009–10 Indonesia Super League U-21 second group stage: Group N: Rank / Team / Pld / W / D / L / GF / GA / GD / Pts; 1 / Pelita Jaya U-21 / 2 / 2 / 0 / 0 / 4 / 1 / +3 / 6; 2 / Persebaya U-21 / 2 / 1 / 0 / 1 / 2 / 2 / 0 / 3; 3 / Persiwa U-21 / 2 / 0 / 0 / 2 / 0 / 3 / -3 / 0		
Opponent	Result	Legs	Knockout stage	Opponent	Result	Legs
Persebaya U-21	1–1(6-5) (pso)	One-leg match played	Semifinals	Persipura U-21	2–2(6-5) (pso)	One-leg match played

== Match details ==
16 May 2010
15:15 (WIB)

Persib Bandung U-21	2 – 0	Pelita Jaya U-21
Munadi 11' (pen.); Budiawan 90'	Report

Siliwangi Stadium, Bandung
Attendance: 3,000
Referee: Djumadi Effendi (Indonesia)

Persib Bandung U-21	Pelita Jaya U-21

Persib Bandung U-21: 4-4-2
GK	30	(Indonesia) Rizky Subagja		(substituted off) 68'
DF	5	(Indonesia) Yan Harjito (c)
DF	13	(Indonesia) Anggi Indra Permana
DF	23	(Indonesia) Dudi Sunardi	(yellow card) 33'
DF	25	(Indonesia) Rian Permana
MF	2	(Indonesia) Munadi
MF	4	(Indonesia) Dias Angga Putra		(substituted off) 90'
MF	10	(Indonesia) Rendi Saputra
MF	70	(Indonesia) M. Agung Pribadi
FW	17	(Indonesia) Sigit Hermawan		(substituted off) 74'
FW	56	(Indonesia) Rudi Geofani	(yellow card) 29' (yellow-red card) 47'
Substitutes
GK	1	(Indonesia) Cecep Sukandar		(substituted on) 68'
FW	9	(Indonesia) Devi Aditya Solihin
MF	20	(Indonesia) Budiawan		(substituted on) 74'
DF	21	(Indonesia) Tatan Kurnia
FW	29	(Indonesia) Ana Supriatna
MF	50	(Indonesia) Asep Mulyana
DF	80	(Indonesia) M. Latief As Siddik		(substituted on) 90'
Head coach
(Indonesia) Mustika Hadi

Pelita Jaya U-21: 4-2-3-1
GK	30	(Indonesia) Riqi Nugraha	(red card) 8'
DF	33	(Indonesia) Ipan Priyanto
DF	71	(Indonesia) Andri Kamnuron
DF	89	(Indonesia) Maqdis Shalim Alfarizi
DF	94	(Indonesia) Tri Rahmad Priadi
MF	42	(Indonesia) Riyandi Ramadhana Putra		(substituted off) 10'
MF	44	(Indonesia) Joko Sasongko
MF	46	(Indonesia) Andesi Setyo Prabowo	(yellow card) 60'	(substituted off) 64'
MF	88	(Indonesia) Andrie Kurniawan D.R		(substituted off) 79'
MF	91	(Indonesia) Dedi Kusnandar (c)
FW	99	(Indonesia) Feriansyah Mas'ud
Substitutes
DF	31	(Indonesia) Muhamad Ommar Anwar
MF	39	(Indonesia) Rinto Ali
MF	41	(Indonesia) Muhamad Darusman
DF	50	(Indonesia) Jajang Suryaman
MF	77	(Indonesia) Moch. Romlih		(substituted on) 64'
GK	78	(Indonesia) Bayu Anggara		(substituted on) 10'
FW	82	(Indonesia) Rossy Noprihanis		(substituted on) 79'
Head coach
(Indonesia) Djadjang Nurjaman

ISL U-21 Man of the Match:
(Indonesia) Munadi

== See also ==
- 2009–10 Indonesia Super League U-21
