= 2011 Indonesia Super League U-21 Final =

- Event: 2011 Indonesia Super League U-21
Semen Padang U-21	Persela U-21
(Indonesia)	(Indonesia)
0	2
- Date: 8 May 2010
- Venue: Soemantri Brodjonegoro Stadium, Jakarta
- ISL U-21 Man of the Match: Fandi Eko Utomo (Persela U-21)
- Referee: Jimmy Napitupulu
- Attendance: 30
- Weather: Fine

The 2011 Indonesia Super League U-21 Final was a football match which was played on Sunday, 8 May 2010. It was the 3rd final of the Indonesia Super League U-21. The match was played at the Soemantri Brodjonegoro Stadium in Jakarta and was contested by Semen Padang U-21 of Padang and Persela U-21 from Lamongan. Semen Padang U-21 and Persela U-21 was a debutant of the final stage.

Persela beat Semen Padang with the score 2–0.

== Road to Bandung ==
Persib Bandung U-21			Round	Pelita Jaya U-21		
Main article: 2011 Indonesia Super League U-21 first group stage: Group 1: Rank / Team / Pld / W / D / L / GF / GA / GD / Pts; 1 / Persib U-21 / 8 / 5 / 1 / 2 / 16 / 9 / +7 / 16; 2 / Semen Padang U-21 / 8 / 5 / 1 / 2 / 13 / 9 / +4 / 16; 3 / PSPS U-21 / 8 / 2 / 3 / 3 / 7 / 6 / +1 / 9; 4 / Persija U-21 / 8 / 1 / 4 / 3 / 6 / 11 / −5 / 7; 5 / Sriwijaya U-21 / 8 / 2 / 1 / 5 / 10 / 17 / −7 / 7			First Group stage	Main article: 2011 Indonesia Super League U-21 first group stage: Group 2: Rank / Team / Pld / W / D / L / GF / GA / GD / Pts; 1 / Pelita Jaya U-21 / 8 / 5 / 1 / 2 / 14 / 6 / +8 / 16; 2 / Persela U-21 / 8 / 5 / 0 / 3 / 15 / 8 / +7 / 15; 3 / Arema FC U-21 / 8 / 5 / 0 / 3 / 11 / 10 / +1 / 15; 4 / Deltras U-21 / 8 / 4 / 0 / 4 / 13 / 13 / 0 / 12; 5 / Persijap U-21 / 8 / 0 / 1 / 7 / 3 / 19 / −16 / 1		
Main article: 2011 Indonesia Super League U-21 second group stage: Group B: Rank / Team / Pld / W / D / L / GF / GA / GD / Pts; 1 / Persiwa U-21 / 2 / 1 / 1 / 0 / 2 / 1 / +1 / 4; 2 / Semen Padang U-21 / 2 / 1 / 1 / 0 / 2 / 1 / +1 / 4; 3 / Pelita Jaya U-21 / 2 / 0 / 0 / 2 / 0 / 2 / −2 / 0			Second Group stage	Main article: 2011 Indonesia Super League U-21 second group stage: Group A: Rank / Team / Pld / W / D / L / GF / GA / GD / Pts; 1 / Persisam U-21 / 2 / 1 / 1 / 0 / 3 / 1 / +2 / 4; 2 / Persela U-21 / 2 / 0 / 2 / 0 / 2 / 2 / 0 / 2; 3 / Persib U-21 / 2 / 0 / 1 / 1 / 1 / 3 / −2 / 1		
Opponent	Result	Legs	Knockout stage	Opponent	Result	Legs
Persisam U-21	3–1	One-leg match played	Semifinals	Persiwa U-21	3-2	One-leg match played

== Match details ==
8 May 2011
19:00 (WIB)

Semen Padang U-21	0 – 2	Persela U-21
	(Report)	7' Eky Taufik; 81' (pen.) Fandi Eko

Soemantri Brodjonegoro Stadium, Jakarta
Attendance: 30
Referee: Jimmy Napitupulu

Semen Padang FC U-21	Persela U-21

Persib Bandung U-21: 4-4-2
GK	21	(Indonesia) Putra Syabilul Rasad
CB	3	(Indonesia) Joshua Christian Itaar
CB	29	(Indonesia) Zico Aipa (c)
LB	19	(Indonesia) Doni Andika Putra
RB	23	(Indonesia) Angga Murina Pratama
CM	8	(Indonesia) Revo Ramadhan	(yellow card) 9'	(substituted off) 58'
CM	26	(Indonesia) Roni Rosadi
LM	66	(Indonesia) Anggi Topano
RM	87	(Indonesia) Arifan Fitra Masril
ST	6	(Indonesia) Satria Eka Putra		(substituted off) 62'
ST	98	(Indonesia) Yosua Pahabol	(red card) 86'
Substitutes
MF	13	(Indonesia) Hambali
MF	14	(Indonesia) Agnef Syafantri		(substituted on) 58'
GK	15	(Indonesia) Andriansyah
MF	17	(Indonesia) Hutri Andri Yusa
MF	24	(Indonesia) Muhammad Teguh
DF	33	(Indonesia) Yoga Ramadhan Putra
FW	77	(Indonesia) Andi Rizky Purwanto		(substituted on) 62'
Head coach
(Indonesia) Weliansyah

Pelita Jaya U-21: 4-3-3
GK	89	(Indonesia) Bimantara Yudha Perwira
CB	11	(Indonesia) Balada Mahardika Placido
CB	55	(Indonesia) Ryco Fernanda (c)
LB	41	(Indonesia) Wahyu Nugroho
RB	30	(Indonesia) Eky Taufik Febriyanto		(substituted off) 90'
DM	81	(Indonesia) M. Radikal Idealis
CM	27	(Indonesia) Sutrisno Hadi Kusuma
CM	88	(Indonesia) Agung Fitrayanto	(yellow card) 49'	(substituted off) 69'
LW	85	(Indonesia) Muhammad Bangkit Sabily
RW	99	(Indonesia) Rudy Santoso		(substituted off) 89'
ST	79	(Indonesia) Fandi Eko Utomo
Substitutes
DF	21	(Indonesia) Hendrik Adi Wijaya		(substituted on) 89'
GK	23	(Indonesia) Bayu Hermawan
DF	39	(Indonesia) Rapi'i
MF	70	(Indonesia) Mario Rokhmanto		(substituted on) 90'
FW	72	(Indonesia) Rahmat Johani Saputro
MF	82	(Indonesia) Galih Rangga Birama		(substituted on) 69'
FW	86	(Indonesia) Erwin Sudrajat Wibowo
Head coach
(Indonesia) Didik Ludianto

ISL U-21 Man of the Match:
(Indonesia) Fandi Eko Utomo

== See also ==
- 2010-11 Indonesia Super League U-21
