= 2010–11 Indonesia Super League U-21 =

Indonesian Super League U-21
- Season: 2010-11
- Champions: Persela U-21
- Relegated: PSM Makassar U-21; Persema U-21; Persibo U-21
- Matches: 70
- Goals: 187 (2.67 per match)
- Top goalscorer: Aldaier Makatindu (9 goals)
- Biggest home win: Persisam U-21 9 – 1 Persiwa U-21 (13 February 2011)
- Biggest away win: Sriwijaya FC U-21 1 – 4 Persib U-21 (16 February 2011)
- Highest scoring: Persisam U-21 9 – 1 Persiwa U-21 (13 February 2011)
- Longest winning run: Persib U-21 (4 games) (from February 9 to April 8, 2011)
- Longest unbeaten run: Persib U-21 (6 games) (from January 23 to April 8, 2011)
- Longest losing run: Persijap U-21 (7 games) (from January 24, 2011)

The 2010–11 Indonesia Super League U-21 season will be the third edition of Indonesia Super League U-21 (ISL U-21), a companion competition Indonesian super league that are intended for footballers under the age of twenty-one years.

Persib U-21 is the defending champion in this season. Djarum, an Indonesian tobacco company will continue its participation as the competition's main sponsor.

== Format ==
The competition is divided into three acts consist of two round the group and knockout round. The first round is divided into three groups each containing six clubs, two top teams of each group advanced to the second round. The second half consisted of two groups containing three teams in each group intended, the two best teams from each group advanced to the semifinals. The winner advanced to the final semi-final, while two teams who defeated third-ranked fight. Final winner becomes the champion.

== Promotion and relegation ==
Teams promoted to ISL U-21

- Persibo U-21
- Deltras Sidoarjo U-21
- Semen Padang U-21

Teams relegated

- Persitara U-21
- Persebaya Surabaya U-21 (Previous 4th place)
- Persik Kediri U-21

== Round and draw dates ==
All draws held at PSSI headquarters in Jakarta, Indonesia unless stated otherwise.

Phase	Round	Draw date	Matchday
Group stage	First Group stage	15 January 2011	19 January - 17 April 2011
Group stage	Second Group stage	21 April 2011	26–30 April 2011 at GMSB Stadium, Jakarta
Knockout phase	Semi-finals	21 April 2011	5 May 2011 at GMSB Stadium, Jakarta
Knockout phase	Third place	21 April 2011	8 May 2011 at GMSB Stadium, Jakarta
Knockout phase	Final	21 April 2011	8 May 2011 at GMSB Stadium, Jakarta

== First round ==
PSM Makassar U-21, Persema U-21 and Persibo U-21 withdrawn after the main team of the three U-21 team was withdrawn from Indonesia Super League. Group winners and runners-up advanced to the second group stage.

=== Group 1 ===
Pos	Team	Pld	W	D	L	GF	GA	GD	Pts
1	Persib U-21 (A)	8	5	1	2	16	9	+7	16
2	Semen Padang U-21 (A)	8	5	1	2	13	9	+4	16
3	PSPS U-21	8	2	3	3	7	6	+1	9
4	Persija U-21	8	1	4	3	6	11	−5	7
5	Sriwijaya FC U-21	8	2	1	5	10	17	−7	7

Source: ISL U-21 Review and ISL U-21 Table
(A) Advanced to the second group stage

=== Group 2 ===
Pos	Team	Pld	W	D	L	GF	GA	GD	Pts
1	Pelita Jaya U-21 (A)	8	5	1	2	14	6	+8	16
2	Persela U-21 (A)	8	5	0	3	15	8	+7	15
3	Arema FC U-21	8	5	0	3	11	10	+1	15
4	Deltras Sidoarjo U-21	8	4	0	4	13	13	0	12
5	Persijap U-21	8	0	1	7	3	19	−16	1

Source: ISL U-21 Review and ISL U-21 Table
(A) Advanced to the second group stage

=== Group 3 ===
Pos	Team	Pld	W	D	L	GF	GA	GD	Pts
1	Persisam Putra U-21 (A)	8	6	0	2	25	11	+14	18
2	Persiwa U-21 (A)	8	5	0	3	11	12	−1	15
3	Persipura U-21	8	4	2	2	9	7	+2	14
4	Bontang FC U-21	8	2	1	5	9	18	−9	7
5	Persiba U-21	8	0	3	5	3	9	−6	3

Source: ISL U-21 Review and ISL U-21 Table
(A) Advanced to the second group stage

== Second round ==
Qualify teams: Persib Bandung U-21 and Semen Padang U-21 (Group 1), Pelita Jaya U-21 and Persela U-21 (Group 2), Persisam Putra U-21 and Persiwa Wamena U-21 (Group 3).

All match play in GMSB Stadium. The draw for this Round took place on 21 April 2011 with ties to be played on the weekend of 26–30 April 2011. Group winners and runners-up advanced to the knockout round.

=== Group A ===
Pos	Team	Pld	W	D	L	GF	GA	GD	Pts
1	Persisam U-21 (A)	2	1	1	0	3	1	+2	4
2	Persela U-21 (A)	2	0	2	0	2	2	0	2
3	Persib U-21	2	0	1	1	1	3	−2	1

Source: ISL U-21 Review and ISL U-21 Table
(A) Advanced to the knockout round

=== Group B ===
Pos	Team	Pld	W	D	L	GF	GA	GD	Pts
1	Persiwa U-21 (A)	2	1	1	0	2	1	+1	4
2	Semen Padang U-21 (A)	2	1	1	0	2	1	+1	4
3	Pelita Jaya U-21	2	0	0	2	0	2	−2	0

Source: ISL U-21 Review and ISL U-21 Table
(A) Advanced to the knockout round

== Knockout round ==
Semi-finals
5 May 2011 - Sumantri Brojonegoro Stadium
Persisam U-21	1
Semen Padang U-21	3
5 May 2011 - Sumantri Brojonegoro Stadium
Persiwa U-21	2
Persela U-21	3

Final
to be determined - Sumantri Brojonegoro Stadium
Semen Padang U-21	0
Persela U-21	0
Third place
to be determined - Sumantri Brojonegoro Stadium
Persisam U-21	0
Persiwa U-21	0

=== Semifinal ===
5 May 2011
15:30 (UTC+7)

Persisam U-21	1 – 3	Semen Padang U-21
Aldeir Makatindu 73' (pen.)	(Report)	47' Anggi Topano; 52' Angga Pratama; 74' Satria Eka; (yellow card) 86' Wahyu Firnanda; (yellow card) 90' M. Sa'i Rahman; (red card) 90' Robertho Sogrim

Sumantri Brojonegoro Stadium
Attendance: 0
Referee: Mardi
5 May 2011
19:00 (UTC+7)

Persiwa U-21	2 – 3	Persela U-21
Alan Aronggear 12'; Alan Aronggear (yellow card) 14'; Usa Laksono (yellow card) 35'; Feri Pahabol 69'; Frenky Adi Kosay (yellow card) 74'; Vicky Pahabol (yellow card) 80'; Robert Elopere (red card) 80'	(Report)	48' Fandi Eko; 76' Taufik Febri; 90' Rudy Santoso

Sumantri Brojonegoro Stadium
Attendance: 20
Referee: Maslah Iksan

=== Third placed ===
8 May 2011
15:30 (UTC+7)

Persisam U-21	0 – 1	Persiwa U-21
Sevan Lingga (yellow card) 71'; Mari Siswanto (yellow card) 76'; Aldeir Makatindu (yellow card) 90'	(Report)	37' F.X. Mumpo

Sumantri Brojonegoro Stadium
Attendance: 24

=== Final ===
2011 Indonesia Super League U-21 Final

8 May 2011
19:00 (UTC+7)

Semen Padang U-21	0 – 2	Persela U-21
Revo Ramadhan (yellow card) 6'; Yosua Pahabol (red card) 86'	(Report)	7' Eky Taufik; (yellow card) 47' Agung Fitrayanto; 81' (pen.) Fandi Eko

Sumantri Brojonegoro Stadium
Attendance: 30
Referee: Jimmy Napitupulu

== Winner ==
Champions
Persela U-21

== Awards ==
Season	Best player	Top scorer	Fair play
2010-11	Fandi Eko Utomo	Aldeir Makatindu	Persisam U-21

== Top goalscorers ==
Including matches played on 26 March 2011

Rank	Scorer	Club	Goals
1	(Indonesia) Aldeir Makatindu	Persisam Putra U-21	9
2	(Indonesia) Fandi Eko Utomo	Persela U-21	8
3	(Indonesia) Afriansyah	Pelita Jaya U-21	7
3	(Indonesia) Radiansyah	Persisam Putra U-21	7
5	(Indonesia) Yosua Pahabol	Semen Padang U-21	6
5	(Indonesia) Rudy Santoso	Persela U-21	6
5	(Indonesia) Yohanes Ferinando Pahabol	Persiwa U-21	6
8	(Indonesia) Mohammad Andi Fatchur Rohman	Arema FC U-21	5
8	(Indonesia) Satria Eka Putra	Semen Padang U-21	5
10	(Indonesia) Ahmad Hamdan Syaifuddin	Deltras U-21	4
10	(Indonesia) Rizky Ramadhana	Sriwijaya FC U-21	4
12	(Indonesia) Arnoldy Polii	Bontang FC U-21	3
12	(Indonesia) Loudry Meilana Setiawan	Persisam Putra U-21	3
12	(Indonesia) Riyandi Ramadhana Putra	Pelita Jaya U-21	3
12	(Indonesia) Erwin Ramdani	Persib U-21	3
