= 2010–11 Indonesia Super League U-21 knockout stage =

The knockout phase of the 2010–11 Indonesia Super League U-21 began on 4 May 2011 and will conclude on 8 May 2011 with the final at Soemantri Brodjonegoro Stadium in Jakarta, Indonesia. The knockout phase involves the four teams who finished in the top two in each of their groups in the second group stage.

Starting times up to end of May are WIB (UTC+7).

== Round and draw dates ==
All draws held at PSSI headquarters in Jakarta, Indonesia.

Round	Draw date and time	Matchday
Semi-finals	21 April 2011	5 May 2011
Third placed	21 April 2011	8 May 2011 at Soemantri Brodjonegoro Stadium, Jakarta
Final	21 April 2011	8 May 2011 at Soemantri Brodjonegoro Stadium, Jakarta

== Qualified teams ==
Key to colours
Seeded in round of 16 draw
Unseeded in round of 16 draw

Group	Winners	Runners-up
A	Persisam U-21	Persela U-21
B	Persiwa U-21	Semen Padang U-21

== Bracket ==
Semi-finals
5 May 2011 - Soemantri Brodjonegoro Stadium
Persisam U-21	1
Semen Padang U-21	3
5 May 2011 - Soemantri Brodjonegoro Stadium
Persiwa U-21	2
Persela U-21	3

Final
8 May 2011 - Soemantri Brodjonegoro Stadium
Semen Padang U-21	0
Persela U-21	0
Third place
8 May 2011 - Soemantri Brodjonegoro Stadium
Persisam U-21	0
Persiwa U-21	0

== Semi-finals ==
The 2011 Indonesia Super League U-21 Semi-final will be played on 5 May 2011 at Soemantri Brodjonegoro Stadium in Jakarta, Indonesia.

5 May 2011
15:30 (UTC+7)

Persisam U-21	1 – 3	Semen Padang U-21
Aldeir Makatindu 73' (pen.)	(Report)	47' Anggi Topano; 52' Angga Pratama; 74' Satria Eka; (yellow card) 86' Wahyu Firnanda; (yellow card) 90' M. Sa'i Rahman; (red card) 90' Robertho Sogrim

Sumantri Brojonegoro Stadium, Jakarta
Attendance: 0
Referee: Mardi

5 May 2011
19:00 (UTC+7)

Persiwa U-21	2 – 3	Persela U-21
Alan Aronggear 12'; Alan Aronggear (yellow card) 14'; Usa Laksono (yellow card) 35'; Feri Pahabol 69'; Frenky Adi Kosay (yellow card) 74'; Vicky Pahabol (yellow card) 80'; Robert Elopere (red card) 80'	(Report)	48' Fandi Eko; 76' Taufik Febri; 90' Rudy Santoso

Sumantri Brojonegoro Stadium, Jakarta
Attendance: 20
Referee: Maslah Iksan

== Third placed ==
The 2011 Indonesia Super League U-21 Third placed will be played on 8 May 2011 at Soemantri Brodjonegoro Stadium in Jakarta, Indonesia.

8 May 2011
15:30 (UTC+7)

Persisam U-21	0 – 1	Persiwa U-21
Sevan Lingga (yellow card) 71'; Mari Siswanto (yellow card) 76'; Aldeir Makatindu (yellow card) 90'	(Report)	37' F.X. Mumpo

Soemantri Brodjonegoro Stadium, Jakarta
Attendance: 20

== Final ==
The 2011 Indonesia Super League U-21 Final will be played on 8 May 2011 at Soemantri Brodjonegoro Stadium in Jakarta, Indonesia.

8 May 2011
19:00 (UTC+7)

Semen Padang U-21	0 – 2	Persela U-21
Revo Ramadhan (yellow card) 6'; Yosua Pahabol (red card) 86'	(Report)	7' Eky Taufik; (yellow card) 47' Agung Fitrayanto; 81' (pen.) Fandi Eko

Sumantri Brojonegoro Stadium
Attendance: 30
Referee: Jimmy Napitupulu
