= 2014 Indonesia Super League U-21 =

Indonesian Super League U-21
- Season: 2014
- Champions: Semen Padang U-21
- Matches: 116
- Goals: 366 (3.16 per match)
- Top goalscorer: Aldi Al Achya (16 goals)
- Biggest home win: Persita U-21 7–0 Persiba Bantul U-21 (12 June 2014)
- Biggest away win: Barito U-21 1–4 Pusam U-21 (30 April 2014); Perseru U-21 0–3 Persiram U-21 (4 May 2014); Persijap U-21 1–4 Persita U-21 (19 May 2014); Persiba Bantul U-21 0–3 Arema Crs U-21 (28 May 2014)
- Highest scoring: Persiba Bantul U-21 4–3 Persijap U-21 (23 April 2014); Barito Putera U-21 3–4 Persiba Balikpapan U-21 (2 June 2014); Persik U-21 4–3 Persepam U-21 (2 June 2014)
- Longest winning run: 4 games Persik Kediri U-21; Persita U-21
- Longest unbeaten run: 8 games Persik Kediri U-21
- Longest winless run: 7 games Persepam Pamekasan U-21
- Longest losing run: 6 games Barito Putera U-21

The 2014 Indonesia Super League U-21 season was the sixth edition of Indonesia Super League U-21, a competition that is intended for footballers under the age of twenty-one years. The season is scheduled to begin on 12 April 2014 and ends on 19 October 2014. Unlike the previous seasons, this season's participants are the U-21 teams of 2014 Indonesia Super League teams.

Sriwijaya FC U-21 is the defending champion in this season. Semen Padang U-21 became the champion of 2014 after beating defending champion Sriwijaya FC U-21 4–0 on the final. Persipura U-21 managed to finish third after beating Mitra Kukar U-21 5–4 on penalties.

== Format ==
The competition is divided into four acts consist of two group stages and two knockout rounds, which is the semifinals and final. On the first stage, the teams are divided into five groups each containing four or five clubs, the top two or three teams of each group will advance to the second stage. The second stage consists of three groups containing four teams in each group, the best team from each group and the best runner-up will advance to the semifinals. The winner of the semifinals will advance to the final to battle for the championship.

Only players born on or after 1 January 1993 are eligible to compete in the tournament.

== Personnel and stadium ==
Note: Flags indicate national team as has been defined under FIFA eligibility rules. Managers may hold more than one non-FIFA nationality.

Team	City/Province	Stadium	Coach
Arema Cronus	Malang Regency, East Java	Kanjuruhan	(Indonesia) Singgih Pitono
Barito Putera	Banjarmasin, South Kalimantan	Demang Lehman	(Indonesia) Mansyur
Gresik United	Gresik Regency, East Java	Petrokimia	(Indonesia) Ratno Boma
Madura United	Pamekasan Regency, East Java	Gelora Bangkalan	(Indonesia) Suari Kusuma Jaya
Mitra Kukar	Kutai Kartanegara, East Kalimantan	Aji Imbut	(Indonesia) Rahmat Hidayat
Pelita Bandung Raya	Bandung, West Java	Si Jalak Harupat	(Indonesia) Ronny Remon
Bhayangkara F.C.	Surabaya, East Java	Gelora Bung Tomo	(Indonesia) Yusuf Ekodono
Persela Lamongan	Lamongan Regency, East Java	Surajaya	(Indonesia) Ragil Sudirman
Perseru Serui	Yapen Islands Regency, Papua	Mandala^{1}	(Indonesia) Han Mamoribo
Persib Bandung	Bandung, West Java	Si Jalak Harupat	(Brazil) Jaino Matos
Persiba Balikpapan	Balikpapan, East Kalimantan	Persiba	(Indonesia) Subianto
Persiba Bantul	Bantul Regency, Yogyakarta	Sultan Agung	(Indonesia) Didik Listiyanto
Persija Jakarta	Jakarta	Gelora Bung Karno	(Indonesia) Blitz Tarigan
Persijap Jepara	Jepara Regency, Central Java	Gelora Bumi Kartini	(Indonesia) Tri Haryono
Persik Kediri	Kediri, East Java	Brawijaya	(Indonesia) Alfiat
Persipura Jayapura	Jayapura, Papua	Mandala^{1}	(Brazil) Amilton
Persiram Raja Ampat	Raja Ampat Regency, West Papua	Mandala^{1}	(Indonesia) Yoppi Rayar
Persita Tangerang	Tangerang Regency, Banten	Singaperbangsa^{2}	(Indonesia) Wiganda Saputra
PSM Makassar	Makassar, South Sulawesi	Mandala^{1}	(Indonesia) Syamsuddin Batola
Putra Samarinda	Samarinda, East Kalimantan	Palaran	(Indonesia) Heriansyah
Semen Padang	Padang, West Sumatra	Haji Agus Salim	(Indonesia) Delvi Adri
Sriwijaya	Palembang, South Sumatera	Gelora Sriwijaya	(Indonesia) Andi Susanto

Note:
^1 All tim in Group 5 play with home tournament system at the Mandala Stadium, Jayapura.
^2 Persita play at the Singaperbangsa Stadium, Karawang for this season.

== First stage ==
First stage of the group stage will be started on 12 April 2014 to 12 June 2014. All groups will play round-robin tournament, with the exception of Group 5 which will play half round-robin tournament.

=== Group 1 ===
Team	Pld	W	D	L	GF	GA	GD	Pts
Semen Padang U-21 (A)	6	3	3	0	11	6	+5	12
Sriwijaya FC U-21 (A)	6	3	2	1	10	6	+4	11
Persib Bandung U-21	6	2	1	3	7	10	−3	7
Pelita Bandung Raya U-21	6	1	0	5	7	13	−6	3

Source: Statistics
Rules for classification: 1st points; 2nd goal difference; 3rd number of goals scored.
(A) Advanced to the second group stage

=== Group 2 ===
Team	Pld	W	D	L	GF	GA	GD	Pts
Persita U-21 (A)	8	6	0	2	25	8	+17	18
Arema Cronous U-21 (A)	8	4	2	2	11	8	+3	14
Persija Jakarta U-21	8	4	1	3	12	12	0	13
Persiba Bantul U-21	8	3	0	5	8	23	−15	9
Persijap Jepara U-21	8	1	1	6	13	18	−5	4

Source: Statistics
Rules for classification: 1st points; 2nd goal difference; 3rd number of goals scored.
(A) Advanced to the second group stage

=== Group 3 ===
Team	Pld	W	D	L	GF	GA	GD	Pts
Persik Kediri U-21 (A)	8	7	1	0	20	11	+9	22
Bhayangkara F.C. U-21 (A)	8	5	0	3	19	10	+9	15
Gresik United U-21	8	3	1	4	10	11	−1	10
Persela U-21	8	1	3	4	8	14	−6	6
Persepam Pamekasan U-21	8	1	1	6	6	17	−11	4

Source: Statistics
Rules for classification: 1st points; 2nd goal difference; 3rd number of goals scored.
(A) Advanced to the second group stage

=== Group 4 ===
Team	Pld	W	D	L	GF	GA	GD	Pts
Persiba Balikpapan U-21 (A)	6	5	0	1	12	9	+3	15
Mitra Kukar FC U-21 (A)	6	4	0	2	12	5	+7	12
Putra Samarinda U-21	6	3	0	3	8	7	+1	9
Barito Putera U-21	6	0	0	6	5	16	−11	0

Source: Statistics
Rules for classification: 1st points; 2nd goal difference; 3rd number of goals scored.
(A) Advanced to the second group stage

=== Group 5 ===
Team	Pld	W	D	L	GF	GA	GD	Pts
Persipura U-21 (A)	6	5	1	0	15	4	+11	16
Persiram U-21 (A)	6	3	1	2	12	7	+5	10
PSM Makassar U-21	6	0	4	2	5	7	−2	4
Perseru Serui U-21	6	0	2	4	2	16	−14	2

Source: Statistics
Rules for classification: 1st points; 2nd goal difference; 3rd number of goals scored.
(A) Advanced to the second group stage

== Second stage ==
The second stage will be held from 1 September 2014 to 19 September 2014 where each team will play a full season in a home tournament format with two hosts for each group.

Group K will be played in Haji Agus Salim Stadium and Brawijaya Stadium. Group L will be played in Gelora 10 November Stadium and Gelora Sriwijaya Stadium. Group M will be played in Mandala Stadium and Persiba Stadium.

=== Group K ===
Team	Pld	W	D	L	GF	GA	GD	Pts
Semen Padang U-21 (A)	6	4	2	0	10	3	+7	14
Persik Kediri U-21	6	2	2	2	9	12	−3	8
Arema Cronous U-21	6	2	2	2	12	12	0	8
Gresik United U-21	6	1	0	5	9	13	−4	3

(A) Advance to a further round

=== Group L ===
Team	Pld	W	D	L	GF	GA	GD	Pts
Sriwijaya FC U-21 (A)	6	4	1	1	17	6	+11	13
Persita U-21	6	3	2	1	8	6	+2	11
Persija Jakarta U-21	6	2	1	3	7	13	−6	7
Bhayangkara F.C. U-21	6	1	0	5	8	15	−7	3

(A) Advance to a further round

=== Group M ===
Team	Pld	W	D	L	GF	GA	GD	Pts
Persipura U-21 (A)	6	5	1	0	16	3	+13	16
Mitra Kukar U-21	6	3	2	1	11	6	+5	11
Persiram U-21	6	2	0	4	7	15	−8	6
Persiba Balikpapan U-21	6	0	1	5	6	16	−10	1

(A) Advance to a further round

=== Ranking of runner-up teams ===
Team	Pld	W	D	L	GF	GA	GD	Pts
Mitra Kukar U-21 (A)	6	3	2	1	11	6	+5	11
Persita U-21	6	3	2	1	8	6	+2	11
Persik Kediri U-21	6	2	2	2	9	12	−3	8

(A) Advance to a further round

== Knockout stage ==
The semi-finals and final will be played in Jalak Harupat Soreang Stadium.

=== Semi-finals ===
The matches be played on 16 October 2014.

Team 1	Score	Team 2
Semen Padang U-21	2–0	Mitra Kukar U-21
Persipura U-21	1–1 (3–4 pen.)	Sriwijaya FC U-21

=== Third-placed ===
The Third placed will be played on 19 October 2014.

Team 1	Score	Team 2
Mitra Kukar U-21	0–0 (4–5 pen.)	Persipura U-21

=== Final ===
The final will be played on 19 October 2014.

Team 1	Score	Team 2
Semen Padang U-21	4–0	Sriwijaya FC U-21

== Top goalscorers ==
Last Update: 16 October 2014

Rank	Scorer	Club	Goals
1	(Indonesia) Aldi Al Achya	Persita U-21	16
2	(Indonesia) Christovel Sibi	Persipura U-21	11
2	(Indonesia) Achmad Khadafi	Persik U-21	11
4	(Indonesia) Jumansyah	Persiba Balikpapan U-21	9
4	(Indonesia) Ronal Semot	Persiram U-21	9
6	(Indonesia) Fredi Jeferson Isir	Persipura U-21	8

=== Hat-tricks ===
Player	For	Against	Result	Date
(Indonesia) Gugum Gumilar	Semen Padang U-21	Pelita Bandung Raya U-21	4-2	3 May 2014
(Indonesia) Abdul Rahman Lestaluhu	Bhayangkara F.C. U-21	Persela U-21	3-1	8 May 2014
(Indonesia) Heryansyah	Persita U-21	Persijap U-21	4-1	19 May 2014
(Indonesia) Heri Susanto	Pelita Bandung Raya U-21	Persib U-21	4-0	31 May 2014
(Indonesia) Safrizal Harahap	Bhayangkara F.C. U-21	Madura United U-21	3-1	31 May 2014
(Indonesia) Ronal Semot	Persiram U-21	Perseru U-21	5-0	1 June 2014
(Indonesia) Ahmad Syaefullah	Persita U-21	Persiba Bantul U-21	7-0	12 June 2014
(Indonesia) Aldi Al Achya	Persita U-21	Persiba Bantul U-21	7-0	12 June 2014

== See also ==
- 2014 Indonesia Super League
- 2014 Liga Indonesia Premier Division
