= Nerius Alom =

Indonesian association footballer

Personal information
- Full name: Nerius Alom
- Date of birth: 29 November 1994 (age 31)
- Place of birth: Puncak, Indonesia
- Height: 1.76 m (5 ft 9 in)
- Position: Midfielder

Team information
- Current team: Persipuncak Cartensz

Youth career
- 2012–2013: Persidafon Dafonsoro
- 2014: Semen Padang

Senior career*
Years	Team	Apps	(Gls)
2015	Semen Padang	0	(0)
2016–2017	Persipura Jayapura	3	(0)
2017	Persebaya Surabaya	6	(0)
2018	Perseru Serui	3	(0)
2018–2019	PSIS Semarang	14	(0)
2019	PSS Sleman	5	(0)
2019	Sriwijaya	8	(0)
2020	Mitra Kukar	1	(0)
2021	PSIS Semarang	8	(0)
2022	Persela Lamongan	7	(0)
2022–2023	PSDS Deli Serdang	4	(0)
2023	Persipura Jayapura	0	(0)
2025–	Persipuncak Cartensz	3	(0)
- * Club domestic league appearances and goals as of 25 April 2025

Nerius Alom (born 29 November 1994) is an Indonesian professional footballer who plays as a midfielder for Liga 4 club Persipuncak Cartensz. Nerius has a brother who is also a footballer, Nelson Alom.

== Club career ==
=== Early career ===
On 10 October 2014, Nerius was elected the best player in 2014 Indonesia Super League U-21. Moreover, he managed to bring Semen Padang U-21 won in the Liga 1 U-19 for the first time in this year after defeating Sriwijaya U-21.

=== Persipura Jayapura ===
In 2016, Nerius joined to Persipura Jayapura squad in 2016 Indonesia Soccer Championship A, and Nerius made his debut playing 19 minutes against Bali United in the second week.

== Honours ==
=== Club ===
Semen Padang U-21

- Indonesia Super League U-21: 2014

Persipura Jayapura

- Indonesia Soccer Championship A: 2016
