= 2007 Liga Indonesia U-23 =

Liga Indonesia U-23
- Season: 2007
- Champions: Persema U-23
- Matches: 6
- Goals: 29 (4.83 per match)
- Biggest home win: Persema U-23 6–1 Persis U-23
- Highest scoring: Persis U-23 1–7 Persib U-23
- Longest winning run: Persema U-23 (3 games)
- Longest unbeaten run: Persema U-23 (3 games)
- Longest losing run: Persis U-23 (3 games)

The 2007 Liga Indonesia U-23 season was the second iteration of Liga Indonesia U-23 (LI U-23). This Indonesian companion competition league was for football players under the age of 23.

== Final round ==
=== League table ===
Key to colours in group tables
Champions

Rank	Team	Pld	W	D	L	GF	GA	GD	Ptf
1	Persema U-23	3	3	0	0	11	1	+10	5
2	Persib U-23	3	2	0	1	10	6	+4	6
3	Persipura U-23	3	1	0	2	4	6	–2	3
4	Persis U-23	3	0	0	3	4	16	–12	0

=== Results ===
4 November 2007
15:00

Persema U-23	6 – 1	Persis U-23

Gajayana Stadium, Malang
Attendance: 10,000
4 November 2007
19:00

Persib U-23	3 – 1	Persipura U-23

Gajayana Stadium, Malang
Attendance: 3,000
5 November 2007
15:00

Persis U-23	1 – 7	Persib U-23

Gajayana Stadium, Malang
Attendance: 3,000
5 November 2007
19:00

Persipura U-23	0 – 1	Persema U-23

Gajayana Stadium, Malang
Attendance: 13,000
7 November 2007
15:00

Persipura U-23	3 – 2	Persis U-23

Gajayana Stadium, Malang
Attendance: 8,000
7 November 2007
19:00

Persib U-23	0 – 4	Persema U-23

Gajayana Stadium, Malang
Attendance: 13,000

== Winner ==
Persema U-23
