= Pahabol =

Pahabol is a Papuan surname. Notable people with the surname include:

- Yohanes Pahabol (born 1992), Indonesian professional footballer
- Yosua Pahabol (born 1993), Indonesian professional footballer
