= Alfarizi =

Alfarizi is a surname. Notable people with the surname include:

- Johan Alfarizi (born 1990), Indonesian footballer
- Maqdis Shalim Alfarizi (born 1989), Indonesian footballer
