= Persema Malang =

Indonesian football club

- Full name: Persatuan Sepakbola Malang
- Nickname: Bledeg Biru (Blue Lightning)
- Founded: 8 October 1934; 92 years ago as PST Tumapel; 20 June 1953; 73 years ago as Persema Malang
- Ground: Gajayana Stadium; Malang, East Java, Indonesia
- Capacity: 25,000
- Manager: Christian Ariando
- Coach: Vacant
- League: Liga 4
- 2024–25: 4th (East Java zone); Third round, 4th in Group D (National phase)
Home colours	Away colours

Persema, an acronym for Persatuan Sepakbola Malang is an Indonesian football club based in Malang, East Java. They currently compete in the Liga 4.

== History ==
The club was officially established in 1953, with primary funding from Malang's municipal budget. It was part of the Indonesian Super League until January 2011 when they hosted LPI's inaugural match and stopped relying on public funds. The other local team, Arema FC, is one of the most successful clubs in ISL. The team's nickname is "Bledeg Biru" while its home stadium is Gajayana Stadium.

Persema has yet to secure a trophy throughout its tenure in the Indonesian Super League, consistently occupying mid to lower positions in the standings. The team faced relegation to Indonesia's Division One (third-tier) in 2003. However, within two seasons, Persema successfully returned to the second-tier league. Subsequently, Persema earned promotion to the ISL in 2009 and remained in the league until shifting to the LPI in 2011.

Persema is now popular as the club that first hired European-born naturalized players Irfan Bachdim and Kim Jeffrey Kurniawan whose nominations to the Indonesia national under-23 football team in 2011 were cancelled by the Football Association of Indonesia because they chose to play in the breakaway league. Its coach Timo Scheunemann is a German who was born and bred in Indonesia and has become a father figure in Indonesia for Bachdim and Kurniawan. His ability to speak Indonesian and Javanese makes him popular among local journalists.

== Honours ==
=== Domestic leagues ===
- Perserikatan First Division
  - Champions (1): 1989–90
  - Runners-up (1): 1982–83
- Liga Indonesia Premier Division
  - Runners-up (1): 2008–09
- Liga Indonesia U-23
  - Champions (1): 2007

=== Domestic Cups ===
- Soeratin Cup
  - Champions (2): 1965, 1996–97
  - Runners-up (2): 2009, 2012

== Season-by-season records ==
Season	League/Division	Tms.	Pos.	Piala Indonesia	AFC competition(s)	
1994–95	Premier Division	34	12th, East division	–	–	–
1995–96	Premier Division	31	13th, East division	–	–	–
1996–97	Premier Division	32	8th, East division	–	–	–
1997–98	Premier Division	31	did not finish	–	–	–
1998–99	Premier Division	28	4th, Group D	–	–	–
1999–2000	Premier Division	28	8th, East division	–	–	–
2001	Premier Division	28	7th, East division	–	–	–
2002	Premier Division	24	10th, East division	–	–	–
2003	First Division	26	3rd, Group B	–	–	–
2004	First Division	24	3rd, Second round	–	–	–
2005	Premier Division	28	7th, East Division	Second round	–	–
2006	Premier Division	28	7th, East Division	Second round	–	–
2007–08	Premier Division	36	13th, West Division	First round	–	–
2008–09	Premier Division	28	2	Round of 16	–	–
2009–10	Indonesia Super League	18	10	First round	–	–
2011	Liga Primer Indonesia	19	2	–	–	–
2011–12	Indonesian Premier League	12	8	Round of 16	–	–
2013	Indonesian Premier League	16	Disqualified	–	–	–
2014						
2015
2016
2017	Liga 3	32	Eliminated in provincial round	–	–	–
2018						
2019	Liga 3	32	Eliminated in provincial round	–	–	–
2020	Liga 3	season abandoned		–	–	–
2021–22	Liga 3	64	Eliminated in provincial round	–	–	–
2023–24	Liga 3	80	Eliminated in provincial round	–	–	–
2024–25	Liga 4	64	4th, Third round	–	–	–

== Notable former players ==
- Bima Sakti
- Siswanto
- Muhammad Kamri
- I Komang Putra
- Sukasto Effendi
- (Netherlands) (Indonesia) Irfan Bachdim
- (Germany) (Indonesia) Kim Kurniawan
- (Brazil) Caue Benicio
- (Brazil) Jairon Feliciano Damásio
- (Australia) Robert Mark Gaspar
- (Cameroon) Seme Pierre Pattrick
- (Sierra Leone) Brima Pepito Sanusie
