= 2009–10 Indonesia Super League U-21 =

Indonesian Super League U-21
- Season: 2009-10
- Champions: Persib U-21
- Matches: 100
- Goals: 268 (2.68 per match)
- Top goalscorer: Lukas Mandowen (12 goals)

The 2009–10 Indonesia Super League U-21 season will be the second edition of Indonesia Super League U-21 (ISL U-21), a companion competition Indonesian super league that are intended for footballers under the age of twenty-one years.

Pelita Jaya U-21 is the defending champion in this season. Djarum, an Indonesian tobacco company will continue its participation as the competition's main sponsor.

== Format ==
The competition is divided into three acts consist of two round the group and knockout round. The first round is divided into three groups each containing six clubs, two top teams of each group advanced to the second round. The second half consisted of two groups containing three teams in each group intended, the two best teams from each group advanced to the semifinals. The winner advanced to the final semi-final, while two teams who defeated third-ranked fight. Final winner becomes the champion. Play On 29 November 2009 to 16 May 2010

== Promotion and relegation ==
Teams promoted to ISL U-21

- Persebaya Surabaya U-21
- PSPS Pekanbaru U-21
- Persema U-21
- Persisam Putra U-21

Teams relegated

- Persita U-21 (Previous runner-up)
- Deltras Sidoarjo U-21
- PSIS Semarang U-21
- PSMS Medan U-21

== First round ==
Key to colours in group tables
Top two placed teams advance to the 2nd Round

=== Group A ===
Rank	Team	Pld	W	D	L	GF	GA	GD	Pts
1	Pelita Jaya U-21	10	8	0	2	27	13	+14	24
2	Persib U-21	10	6	1	3	18	8	+10	19
3	Sriwijaya FC U-21	10	4	2	4	12	10	+2	14
4	PSPS U-21	10	4	1	5	12	22	-10	13
5	Persitara U-21	10	2	2	6	12	19	-7	8
6	Persija U-21	10	2	2	6	9	18	-9	8

=== Group B ===
Rank	Team	Pld	W	D	L	GF	GA	GD	Pts
1	Persebaya U-21	10	7	3	0	15	4	+11	24
2	Persik U-21	10	4	2	4	13	9	+4	14
3	Persela U-21	10	3	3	4	16	15	+1	12
4	Persijap U-21	10	3	2	5	6	16	-10	11
5	Persema U-21	10	2	4	4	12	14	-2	10
6	Arema FC U-21	10	1	6	3	7	11	-4	9

=== Group C ===
Rank	Team	Pld	W	D	L	GF	GA	GD	Pts
1	Persipura U-21	10	7	2	1	25	6	+19	23
2	Persiwa U-21	10	5	3	2	17	6	+11	18
3	Persiba U-21	10	4	2	4	12	20	-8	14
4	PSM U-21	10	3	3	4	13	12	+1	12
5	Persisam Putra U-21	10	2	2	6	7	16	-9	8
6	Bontang FC U-21	10	2	2	6	6	20	-14	8

== Second round ==
Key to colours in group tables
Top two placed teams advance to the semifinal

=== Group M ===
Group	Team	Pld	W	D	L	GF	GA	GD	Pts
1	Persib U-21	2	2	0	0	5	1	+4	6
2	Persipura U-21	2	1	0	1	3	4	-1	3
3	Persik U-21	2	0	0	2	1	4	0	0

=== Group N ===
Group	Team	Pld	W	D	L	GF	GA	GD	Pts
1	Pelita Jaya U-21	2	2	0	0	4	1	+3	6
2	Persebaya U-21	2	1	0	1	2	2	0	3
3	Persiwa U-21	2	0	0	2	0	3	-3	0

== Knockout round ==
=== Semifinal ===
Thursday, 13 May 2010
15:00

Persib Bandung U-21	1 – 1	Persebaya Surabaya U-21
Saputra 28'		Utomo 52'
Penalties
	6 – 5

Siliwangi Stadium, Bandung
Attendance: 5,000
19:00

Pelita Jaya U-21	2 – 2	Persipura Jayapura U-21
Andrie 21', 86'		Iwanggin 63'; Mandowen 71'
Penalties
	6 – 5

Siliwangi Stadium, Bandung
Attendance: 1,000

=== Third placed ===
Saturday, 15 May 2010
15:00

Persebaya Surabaya U-21	0 – 4	Persipura Jayapura U-21
		Matui 44'; Romario 51'; Mandowen 62'; Iwanggin 77'

Siliwangi Stadium, Bandung
Attendance: 3,000

=== Final ===
Sunday, 16 May 2010
15:15

Persib Bandung U-21	2 – 0	Pelita Jaya U-21
Munadi 11' (pen.); Budiawan 90'	Report

Siliwangi Stadium, Bandung
Attendance: 5,000

== Winner ==
Champions

Persib Bandung U-21

== Awards ==
Season	Best player	Top scorer	Fair play
2009-10	Munadi (Persib Bandung U-21)	Lukas Mandowen (Persipura U-21) = 12 Goal	Pelita Jaya U-21
