= Aronggear =

Aronggear is an Indonesian name. Notable people with the name include:

- Alan Aronggear (born 1990), Indonesian footballer
- Sarce Aronggear (born 1979), Indonesian sprint canoer
