= Ipan Priyanto =

Indonesian footballer

Personal information
- Full name: Ipan Priyanto
- Date of birth: 19 January 1990 (age 36)
- Place of birth: Semarang, Indonesia
- Height: 1.78 m (5 ft 10 in)
- Position: Defender

Youth career
- 2005–2008: Diklat Ragunan
- 2008–2009: PSIS U-21
- 2009–2010: Pelita Jaya U-21

Senior career*
Years	Team	Apps	(Gls)
2008	Pesik Kuningan	12	(0)
2009–2012	Pelita Jaya	10	(0)
2012–2013	PSIS Semarang	10	(0)
2014	Persitara Jakarta Utara	27	(0)
2015–2019	PSGC Ciamis	35	(0)

International career
2008	Indonesia U18		
- * Club domestic league appearances and goals

Ipan Priyanto (born January 19, 1990, in Semarang) is an Indonesian former footballer.

== Club statistics ==
Club	Season	Super League		Premier Division		Piala Indonesia		Total	
Club	Season	Apps	Goals	Apps	Goals	Apps	Goals	Apps	Goals
Pelita Jaya FC	2010-11	9	0	-		-		9	0
Pelita Jaya FC	2011-12	1	0	-		-		1	0
Total		10	0	-		-		10	0

== Hounors ==
=== Clubs ===
- Pelita Jaya U-21 :
  - Indonesia Super League U-21 runner-up : 1 (2009-10)
