= Lukas Mandowen =

Indonesian footballer

Personal information
- Full name: Lukas Wellem Mandowen
- Date of birth: 6 April 1989 (age 37)
- Place of birth: Sarmi, Indonesia
- Height: 1.58 m (5 ft 2 in)
- Positions: Forward; winger

Youth career
- 2001: PS Kuskus
- 2002−2004: Perseru Serui
- 2005−2007: Persimi Sarmi
- 2008−2010: Persipura U-21

Senior career*
Years	Team	Apps	(Gls)
2010−2017	Persipura Jayapura	109	(18)
2017–2018	Perseru Serui	39	(3)
2018	Aceh United	1	(0)
Total		149	(21)

International career
2011	Indonesia U23	2	(0)
Medal record
Men's football
Representing Indonesia
Southeast Asian Games
Silver medal – second place	2011 Jakarta-Palembang	Team
- * Club domestic league appearances and goals

Lukas Mandowen (born 6 April 1989) is an Indonesian former footballer. Previously he played for Perseru Serui and Persipura Jayapura. During youth career, he spent two seasons with the Persipura U-21. He was the top scorer of the competition Indonesia Super League U-21 at the 2009–10 season.

== Honours ==
Persipura Jayapura

- Indonesia Super League: 2010–11
- Indonesian Inter Island Cup: 2011

Indonesia U-23

- SEA Games silver medal: 2011

Individual

- Indonesia Super League U-21 Top Scorer: 2009–10
