= Cauê Benicio =

Brazilian footballer (born 1978)

Personal information
- Full name: Cauê Castro Menezes Benício
- Date of birth: 6 May 1978 (age 48)
- Place of birth: Rio de Janeiro, Brazil
- Height: 1.70 m (5 ft 7 in)
- Position: Midfielder

Youth career
- Fluminense
- Botafogo

Senior career*
Years	Team	Apps	(Gls)
1998–1999	Aracatuba	7	(0)
1999–2000	Machico	6	(0)
2000–2001	Leyton Orient		
2001–2002	Colo Colo	14	(3)
2002–2003	Amora	17	(3)
2003–2004	Portosantense	16	(2)
2004–2006	IFK Ölme	65	(21)
2006–2007	Persema Malang	27	(5)
2007–2008	Team Wellington	12	(1)
2008–2009	Çetinkaya Türk S.K.	17	(6)
2009–2011	Hà Nội T&T	55	(13)
2011–2012	IFK Ölme	10	(1)
2012–2013	Bangkok United F.C.	0	(0)
2013–2014	Karlstad BK	7	(0)
2014–2015	Villastadens IF	14	(1)
2015–2016	Chiangmai FC	16	(2)
2016–2018	IFK Åmål	43	(12)
2019	FBK Karlstad		

Managerial career
- –2018: IFK Åmål (assistant)
- 2019: FBK Karlstad
- * Club domestic league appearances and goals

Cauê Castro Menezes Benício (born 6 May 1978) is a Brazilian former footballer. He played for various clubs in Europe and Asia. He played for one of the biggest clubs in Vietnam, Hà Nội T&T, as a number 10.

He was playing assistant manager of IFK Åmål before being hired as manager of FBK Karlstad in 2019. He was sacked in June 2019.

== Honours ==
Hà Nội T&T F.C.

- V-League (1): 2010
- Vietnamese Super Cup (1): 2010
