= Liga Indonesia U-23 =

- Founded: 2006
- Country: Indonesia
- Confederation: AFC (Asia)
- Level on pyramid: 1
- International cup(s): AFC Champions League; AFC Cup
- Current champions: Persema U-23 (2007)
- Most championships: Persisam U-23; Persema U-23 (1 title)
- Website: www.ligaindonesia.co.id

Liga Indonesia U-23 is a junior level league involving U-23 team of participating clubs in the Liga Indonesia. Building and managing a complete U-23 team is one of the requirements for clubs participating in the Liga Indonesia, as regulated by the Football Association of Indonesia (PSSI).

== Competition format ==
Unlike the regular competition tournament competition using the system. Competition begins with the provision at the provincial level. Then the best teams will compete at the regional level. After that the degree competisi national level, the four best teams advanced to the Final round.

The final round was held with a league system with a home tournament. One of the four participants of the competition will host this round. The first ranked team to be champions of this competition.

== Champions ==
| Season | Winner | Runner up | Third rank |
|---|---|---|---|
| 2006 | Persisam U-23 | Persib U-23 | Persik U-23 |
| 2007 | Persema U-23 | Persib U-23 | Persipura U-23 |
