= Roni Rosadi =

Indonesian footballer

Personal information
- Full name: Roni Rosadi
- Date of birth: 24 March 1991 (age 35)
- Place of birth: Bandar Lampung, Indonesia
- Height: 1.75 m (5 ft 9 in)
- Position: Full-back

Youth career
- 2010–2011: Semen Padang

Senior career*
Years	Team	Apps	(Gls)
2011–2013	PS Bengkulu	20	(0)
2014	Lampung	8	(0)
2015–2017	Persegres Gresik	23	(0)
2018	Mitra Kukar	15	(0)
2019	Semen Padang	14	(0)
2020–2021	Badak Lampung	10	(0)
2022	PSIM Yogyakarta	1	(0)
2023–2024	Persibo Bojonegoro	20	(0)
2024	Persikota Tangerang	1	(0)
- * Club domestic league appearances and goals as of 14 September 2024

Roni Rosadi (born 24 March 1991) is an Indonesian professional footballer who plays as a full-back.

== Club career ==
=== Mitra Kukar ===
In 2018, Roni Rosadi signed a one-year contract with Indonesian Liga 1 club Mitra Kukar. He made his debut on 8 April 2018 in a match against Persib Bandung at the Gelora Bandung Lautan Api Stadium, Bandung.

=== Semen Padang ===
He was signed for Semen Padang to play in Liga 1 on the 2019 season. Rosadi made his debut on 20 August 2019 in a match against Persela Lamongan at the Haji Agus Salim Stadium, Padang.

=== Badak Lampung ===
He was signed for Badak Lampung to play in Liga 2 in the 2020 season. This season was suspended on 27 March 2020 due to the COVID-19 pandemic. The season was abandoned and was declared void on 20 January 2021.

== Honours ==
=== Club ===
Semen Padang U-21

- Indonesia Super League U-21 runner-up: 2010–11
