= Muhammad Kamri =

Indonesian footballer

Personal information
- Full name: Muhammad Kamri
- Date of birth: 26 June 1979 (age 47)
- Place of birth: Paser, Indonesia
- Height: 1.64 m (5 ft 5 in)
- Position: Midfielder

Youth career
- 2000: PON Kaltim

Senior career*
Years	Team	Apps	(Gls)
2003	Perseden Denpasar	14	(9)
2004–2009	Persema Malang	57	(13)
2009	Persepar Palangkaraya	18	(5)
2010–2013	Persema Malang	31	(7)
2014	Persiba Balikpapan	11	(0)
2015–2016	Gresik United	10	(0)
Total		141	(34)
- * Club domestic league appearances and goals

Muhammad Kamri (born 26 June 1979) is an Indonesian former footballer who plays as a midfielder.

== Club career ==
In December 2014, he signed with Gresik United.

== Honours ==
Persema Malang

- Liga Indonesia Premier Division runner up: 2008–09
