= Asep Mulyana =

Indonesian footballer

Personal information
- Full name: Asep Mulyana
- Date of birth: 7 October 1989 (age 37)
- Place of birth: Bandung, Indonesia
- Height: 1.70 m (5 ft 7 in)
- Position: Midfielder

Youth career
- Persib Bandung

Senior career*
Years	Team	Apps	(Gls)
2013–2014	Pelita Bandung Raya	14	(0)
2015–2018	PSGC Ciamis	23	(0)
- * Club domestic league appearances and goals

Asep Mulyana or sometimes called Ato (born October 7, 1989) is an Indonesian former footballer.

== Career ==
In January 2015, he signed with PSGC.
