= Subianto =

Subianto is a name of Indonesian origin. Notable people with the surname include:

- Antonius Subianto Bunjamin (born 1968), Indonesian Roman Catholic priest
- Bambang Subianto (1945–2022), Indonesian academic and politician
- Prabowo Subianto (born 1951), President of Indonesia, businessman and former army general
