= Maqdis Alfarizi =

Indonesian footballer

Personal information
- Full name: Maqdis Shalim Alfarizi
- Date of birth: 8 April 1989 (age 37)
- Place of birth: Cirebon, Indonesia
- Height: 1.70 m (5 ft 7 in)
- Position: Midfielder

Youth career
- 2001–2007: Saint Prima
- 2008–2010: Pelita Jaya U21

Senior career*
Years	Team	Apps	(Gls)
2010–2013	Pelita Jaya	35	(0)
2014–2015	Martapura	17	(2)
Total		52	(2)
- * Club domestic league appearances and goals

Maqdis Shalim Alfarizi (born 8 April 1989) is a former Indonesian footballer who played as a midfielder.

== Club statistics ==
Club	Season	Super League		Premier Division		Piala Indonesia		Total	
Club	Season	Apps	Goals	Apps	Goals	Apps	Goals	Apps	Goals
Pelita Jaya	2010–11	19	0	—		—		19	0
Pelita Jaya	2011–12	16	0	—		—		16	0
Total		35	0	—		—		25	0

== Honours ==
=== Clubs ===
- Pelita Jaya U-21 :
  - Indonesia Super League U-21 champions: (2008-09)
  - Indonesia Super League U-21 runner-up: (2009-10)
