= Munadi (footballer) =

Indonesian footballer

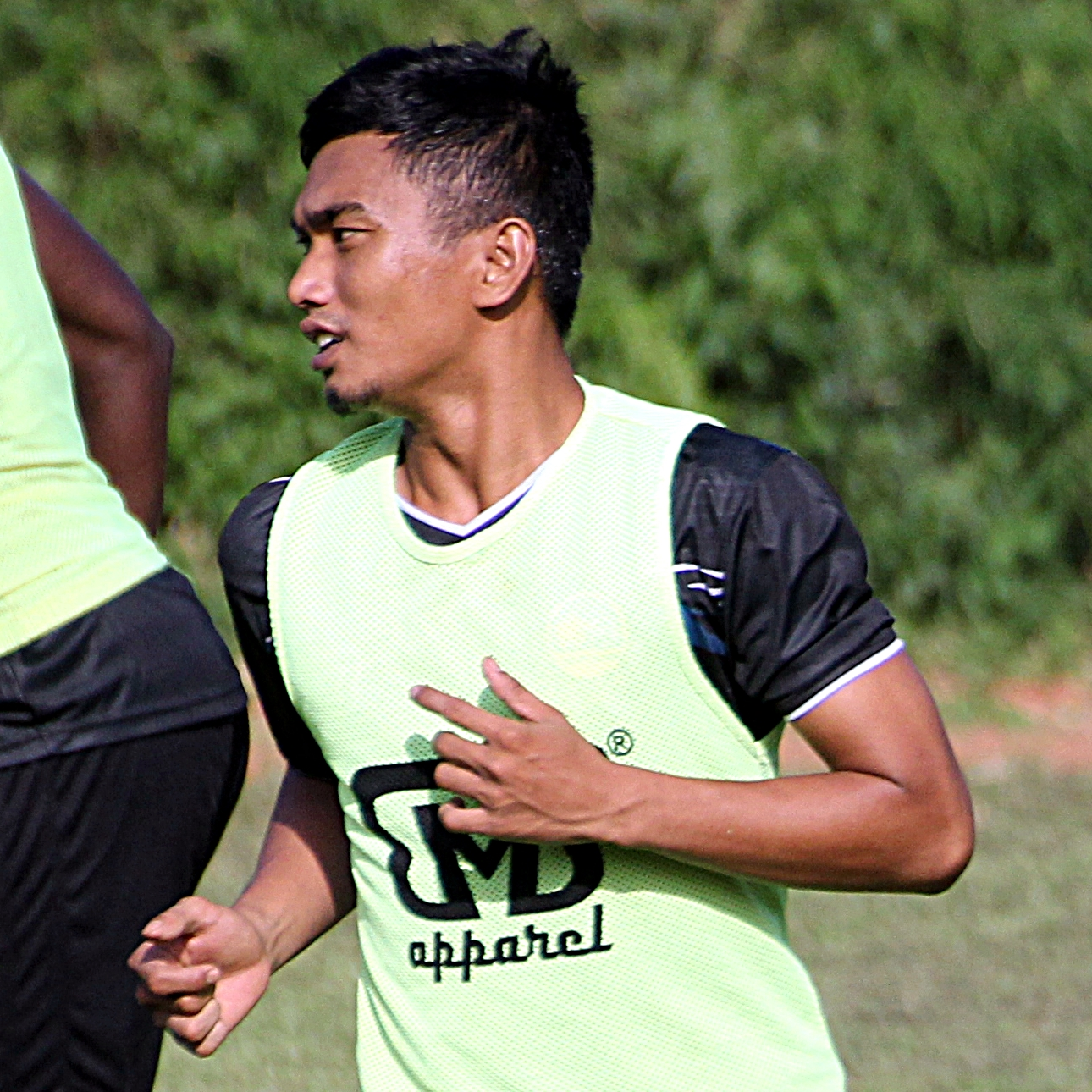
- Munadi with TIRA-Persikabo in 2019

Personal information
- Full name: Munadi
- Date of birth: 25 January 1989 (age 37)
- Place of birth: Bekasi, Indonesia
- Height: 1.68 m (5 ft 6 in)
- Position: Defensive midfielder

Youth career
- SSB Tunas Patriot Bekasi
- 2006–2009: Persib Bandung

Senior career*
Years	Team	Apps	(Gls)
2009–2011	Persib Bandung	4	(0)
2011–2012	Persibo Bojonegoro	16	(0)
2012	Pelita Bandung Raya	0	(0)
2013–2014	Persikabo Bogor	36	(1)
2015	Cilegon United	0	(0)
2016–2017	Persikabo Bogor	23	(4)
2018	Lampung Sakti	10	(0)
2019–2024	Persikabo 1973	57	(1)
2023–2024	→ PSMS Medan (loan)	10	(0)

International career
2007	Indonesia U19	2	(0)
- * Club domestic league appearances and goals as of 27 October 2024

Munadi (born 25 January 1989) is an Indonesian professional footballer who plays as a defensive midfielder.

== Club career ==
=== TIRA-Persikabo ===
He was signed for TIRA-Persikabo to play in Liga 1 in the 2019 season. Munadi made his league debut on 26 July 2019 in a match against Kalteng Putra at the Pakansari Stadium, Cibinong.

== Honours ==
=== Club honours ===
Persib Bandung U-18

- Soeratin Cup: 2006

Persib Bandung U-21

- Indonesia Super League U-21: 2009–10

=== Individual honours ===
- Indonesia Super League U-21 Best player: 2009-10
