= Afriansyah =

Indonesian footballer

Personal information
- Full name: Afriansyah
- Date of birth: 26 April 1991 (age 35)
- Place of birth: Bangka, Indonesia
- Height: 1.75 m (5 ft 9 in)
- Position: Forward

Team information
- Current team: WGroup
- Number: 10

Youth career
- 2010–2013: Pelita Jaya

Senior career*
Years	Team	Apps	(Gls)
2013	Persika Karawang		
2014–2016	Cilegon United	0	(0)
2016	Persita Tangerang	14	(5)
2017	Cilegon United	17	(5)
2018–2019	Semen Padang	30	(6)
2019–2021	Muba Babel United	7	(2)
2021	Sriwijaya	9	(2)
2022	PSPS Riau	5	(0)
2023–2025	Adhyaksa	20	(9)
2025–	WGroup	12	(2)
- * Club domestic league appearances and goals as of 15 February 2026

Afriansyah (born 26 April 1991) is an Indonesian professional footballer who plays as a forward for Liga 4 club WGroup.

== Club career ==
=== Semen Padang ===
In 2018, Afriansyah signed a contract with Indonesian Liga 2 club Semen Padang.

=== Muba Babel United ===
He was signed for Muba Babel United to play in Liga 2 in the 2019 season.

=== Sriwijaya ===
In 2021, Afriansyah signed a contract with Indonesian Liga 2 club Sriwijaya. He made his league debut on 6 October 2021 against Muba Babel United at the Gelora Sriwijaya Stadium, Palembang.

== Honours ==
=== Club ===
Semen Padang

- Liga 2 runner-up: 2018
