= Persiba Stadium =

Stadium in Balikpapan, Indonesia

Persiba Stadium Parikesit Stadium
- Stadion Persiba
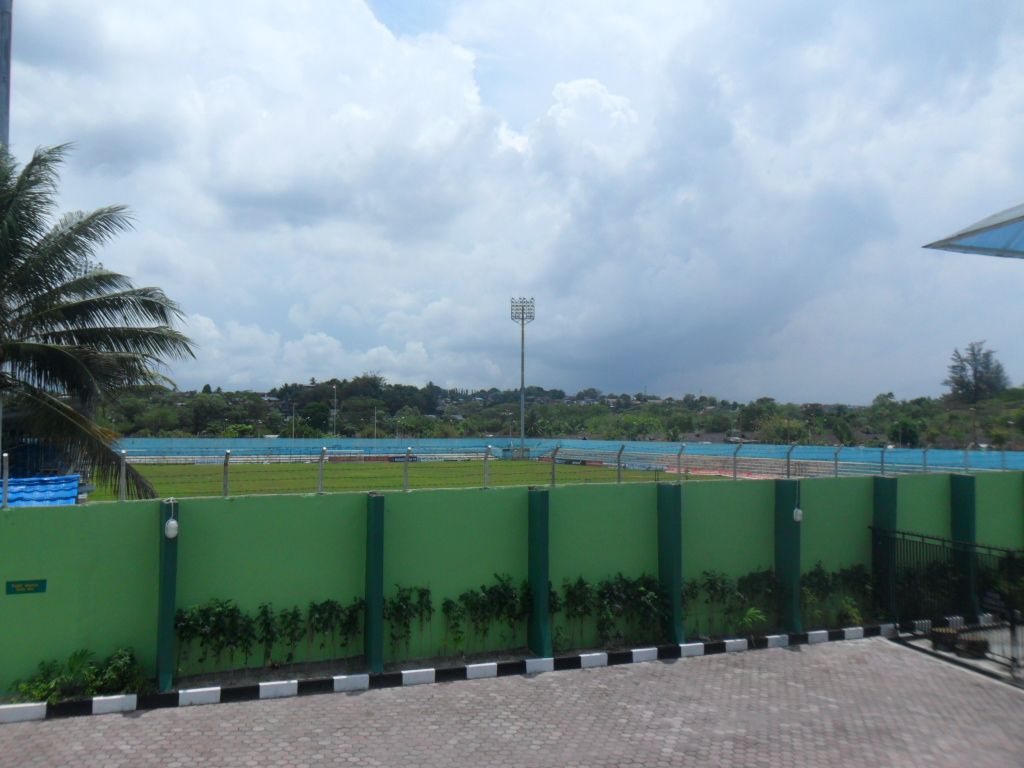
- Outside View

- Location in Kalimantan and Indonesia Persiba Stadium (Indonesia)
- Address: Jl. Parikesit, Mekar Sari, Central Balikpapan, Balikpapan City, East Kalimantan 76123; Indonesia
- Location: Balikpapan, East Kalimantan
- Coordinates: 1°14′38″S 116°49′48″E
- Owner: Pertamina
- Operator: Pertamina
- Capacity: 12,500
- Surface: Grass field

Construction
- Renovated: 2008
- Closed: September 2017

Tenant
- Persiba Balikpapan (August 2017)

Persiba Stadium (Indonesian: Stadion Persiba, also known as Parikesit Stadium) was a multi-use stadium in Balikpapan, Indonesia. It was used mostly for football matches and was used as the home stadium for Persiba Balikpapan. The stadium had a capacity of 12,500 people after the 2009 renovation.

In 2008, the stadium was renovated to accommodate local team Persiba Balikpapan to compete in Indonesia Super League and Copa Dji Sam Soe 2008/09 season. Lighting and spectators' seating were added as new features. Improvement in the dressing room, grass, scoreboard, and other amenities were carried out.

The stadium was to be used by Persiba Balikpapan to host football matches against its guests beginning January 2009.
