= Budiawan =

Indonesian footballer

Personal information
- Full name: Budiawan
- Date of birth: 9 September 1990 (age 36)
- Place of birth: Bandung, Indonesia
- Height: 1.68 m (5 ft 6 in)
- Position: Midfielder

Youth career
- 2009–2011: Persib Bandung

Senior career*
Years	Team	Apps	(Gls)
2011–2012	Persib Bandung	19	(1)
2012–2013	Persisam Putra	0	(0)
2014–2017	PSGC Ciamis	59	(11)
2018	Persik Kendal	9	(0)
2018	Persika Karawang	12	(2)
2019	PSGC Ciamis	7	(1)
2019	Bandung United	12	(1)
Total		118	(16)
- * Club domestic league appearances and goals

Budiawan (born 9 September 1990) is an Indonesian former footballer who plays as a midfielder.

== Career ==
His first goal for Persib Bandung is against Deltras.

== Honours ==
Persib Bandung U-21

- Indonesia Super League U-21: 2009–10
