= Persema Malang U-21 =

Indonesian football club

- Full name: Persatuan Sepak Bola Malang Under-21
- Founded: 20 June 1953
- Ground: Gajayana Stadium; Malang, East Java, Indonesia
- Capacity: 30,000
Home colours	Away colours

Persema U-21, an acronym for Persatuan Sepak Bola Malang Under-21 is an Indonesian football club based in Malang.

== Achievements & honors ==
- Liga Indonesia U-23
  - Winners (1): 2007

== See also ==
- Persema Malang
- Indonesia Super League U-21
