= Eky Taufik =

Indonesian footballer

Personal information
- Full name: Eky Taufik Febriyanto
- Date of birth: 15 February 1991 (age 35)
- Place of birth: Sragen, Indonesia
- Height: 1.75 m (5 ft 9 in)
- Position: Full-back

Team information
- Current team: Persis Solo
- Number: 30

Youth career
- 2009–2010: Persebaya Surabaya
- 2010–2012: Persela Lamongan

Senior career*
Years	Team	Apps	(Gls)
2011–2021	Persela Lamongan	117	(2)
2021–	Persis Solo	100	(4)
2022	→ Bali United (loan)	7	(0)

International career
2014	Indonesia U23	1	(0)
- * Club domestic league appearances and goals as of 22:00, 23 May 2026 (UTC)

Eky Taufik Febriyanto (born on 15 February 1991) is an Indonesian professional footballer who plays as a full-back for Championship club Persis Solo.

== Club career ==
=== Persela Lamongan ===
In 2011, Eky signed with Persela Lamongan for 2011–12 Indonesia Super League, At the junior level, Eky was the captain of Persela U21 which won the title for two consecutive seasons at 2010–11 ISL U21 and 2012 ISL U21.

On 30 April 2021, a decade more strengthening Persela, Eky officially resigned from the team this season, the certainty was obtained from his post on his personal Instagram account on Friday, While he had a good season in his first year with 117 appearances and two goals.

=== Persis Solo ===
On 6 May 2021, Eky signed a contract with Indonesian Liga 2 club Persis Solo, he officially became a part of the Sambernyawa Warriors (the nickname of Persis Solo) to navigate 2021–22 season. He made his league debut on 26 September by starting in a 2–0 win against PSG Pati, and he also scored his first goal for Persis in the 22nd minute.

==== Bali United (loan) ====
In January 2022, Eky signed a contract with Liga 1 club Bali United on loan from Persis Solo. Eky made his league debut in a 1–0 win against Persib Bandung on 13 January 2022 as a substitute for I Made Andhika Wijaya in the 79th minute at the Ngurah Rai Stadium, Denpasar.

== Honours ==
=== Club ===
Persela Lamongan U-21

- Indonesia Super League U-21: 2010–11, 2012

Persis Solo

- Liga 2: 2021

Bali United

- Liga 1: 2021–22

=== Individual ===
- Liga 2 Best XI: 2021
