= Yosua Pahabol =

Indonesian footballer

Personal information
- Full name: Yosua Pahabol
- Date of birth: 7 November 1993 (age 32)
- Place of birth: Yahukimo, Indonesia
- Height: 1.72 m (5 ft 8 in)
- Positions: Forward; winger

Youth career
- 2007: PS Sparta
- 2008–2010: Persiwa Wamena U-21
- 2010–2011: Semen Padang FC U-21

Senior career*
Years	Team	Apps	(Gls)
2011–2013	Semen Padang	20	(0)
2013–2016	Barito Putera	39	(2)
2017–2018	Persiraja Banda Aceh	18	(0)

International career^{‡}
2012	Indonesia U21	6	(1)
2012	Indonesia U23	3	(0)
- * Club domestic league appearances and goals ‡ National team caps and goals as of 12 July 2012

Yosua Pahabol (born 7 November 1993), also known as simply Yosua, is an Indonesian former footballer.

== International goals ==
He scored one goal at under-21 level:

Goal	Date	Venue	Opponent	Score	Result	Competition
1	4 March 2012	Sultan Hassanal Bolkiah Stadium, Bandar Seri Begawan, Brunei	Philippines U21	3–0	3–0	2012 Hassanal Bolkiah Trophy

== Career ==
He played for Semen Padang from 2010 to 2013, then moved to Barito Putera for the 2014 season. He spent several years at Barito Putera before finishing off his career at Persiraja Banda Aceh.

== Honours ==
Semen Padang

- Indonesia Premier League: 2011-12
- Indonesian Community Shield: 2013
- Piala Indonesia runner-up: 2012
