= Rendi Saputra =

Indonesian footballer (born April 1989)

Personal information
- Date of birth: 28 April 1989 (age 37)
- Place of birth: Pekanbaru, Indonesia
- Height: 1.75 m (5 ft 9 in)
- Position: Midfielder

Youth career
- 2009–2010: Persib Bandung

Senior career*
Years	Team	Apps	(Gls)
2010–2011	Persib Bandung	1	(0)
2013	Pelita Bandung Raya	18	(1)
2014–2015	Persik Kediri	16	(3)
2015–2016	Persiba Balikpapan	29	(0)
2017–2018	Persegres Gresik United	16	(0)
2018	PSPS Riau	17	(3)
2019–2020	PSMS Medan	22	(0)
2021–2023	PSPS Riau	13	(1)
- * Club domestic league appearances and goals as of 22:28, 17 December 2014 (UTC)

Rendi Saputra (born 28 April 1989) is an Indonesian footballer who plays as a midfielder.
