= Fandi Eko Utomo =

Indonesian footballer (born 1991)

Personal information
- Full name: Fandi Eko Utomo
- Date of birth: 2 March 1991 (age 35)
- Place of birth: Surabaya, Indonesia
- Height: 1.70 m (5 ft 7 in)
- Position: Midfielder

Team information
- Current team: Persikutim United
- Number: 22

Youth career
- 2009–2010: Persebaya Surabaya
- 2010–2011: Persela Lamongan

Senior career*
Years	Team	Apps	(Gls)
2011–2013	Persela Lamongan	25	(5)
2014–2016	Bhayangkara	52	(3)
2017	Madura United	15	(2)
2018–2019	Persebaya Surabaya	42	(5)
2020–2022	PSIS Semarang	26	(2)
2022	PSS Sleman	5	(0)
2023	Bhayangkara	8	(0)
2023–2024	Semen Padang	12	(0)
2024–2025	Persikota Tangerang	18	(0)
2025–	Persikutim United	7	(1)

International career
2012–2014	Indonesia U23	20	(4)
2014	Indonesia	1	(0)
Medal record
Men's football
Representing Indonesia
Islamic Solidarity Games
Silver medal – second place	2013 Palembang	Team
Southeast Asian Games
Silver medal – second place	2013 Naypyidaw	Team
- * Club domestic league appearances and goals as of 11 January 2026

Fandi Eko Utomo (born 2 March 1991) is an Indonesian professional footballer who plays as a midfielder for Liga Nusantara club Persikutim United.

== Personal life ==
He is the son of former Indonesian international and Persebaya player, Yusuf Ekodono.

== International goals ==
International U23 goals

Goal	Date	Venue	Opponent	Score	Result	Competition
1	30 March 2014	Gelora Sriwijaya Stadium, Palembang, Indonesia	Morocco U20	1–0	1–0	2013 Islamic Solidarity Games
1	30 March 2014	Manahan Stadium, Surakarta, Indonesia	Sri Lanka U23	2–0	5–0	Friendly
2	15 September 2014	Goyang Stadium, Goyang, South Korea	Timor-Leste U23	0–7	0–7	2014 Asian Games
3	26 September 2014	Ansan Wa~ Stadium, Ansan, South Korea	North Korea U23	3–1	4–1	2014 Asian Games

== Honours ==
=== Clubs honors ===
Persebaya Surabaya

- Liga 1 runner-up: 2019
- Indonesia President's Cup runner-up: 2019

Semen Padang

- Liga 2 runner-up: 2023–24

Persela U-21

- Indonesia Super League U-21: 2011

=== Individual honors ===
- Indonesia Super League U-21 Best Player: 2011

=== Country honors ===
Indonesia U-23

- Islamic Solidarity Games silver medal: 2013
- SEA Games silver medal: 2013
