= Soemantri Brodjonegoro Stadium =

Multi-use stadium in South Jakarta, Indonesia

- GOR Soemantri

- Location in Jakarta
- Location: South Jakarta, Jakarta, Indonesia
- Coordinates: 6.221405°S 106.834632°E
- Owner: Government of the Special Capital Region of Jakarta
- Operator: Government of the Special Capital Region of Jakarta
- Capacity: 5,000
- Surface: Grass field
- Public transit: Rasuna Said; GOR Soemantri

Tenants
- Jaksel; Batavia

Soemantri Brodjonegoro Stadium (Indonesian: Stadion Soemantri Brodjonegoro) is a multi-use stadium in South Jakarta, DKI Jakarta, Indonesia. It is currently used mostly for football matches and is used as the home stadium for Jaksel. The stadium has a capacity of 5,000 people.

The stadium has been used for various purposes. On 24 May 2001, Irish vocal pop band Westlife held a concert for their Where Dreams Come True Tour supporting their album Coast to Coast. Final round of the AQUA Danone Nations Cup 2018 was held in this stadium. 2017-18 IBL Finals game 2 and 3 was also held in this stadium.
