= Alan Aronggear =

Indonesian footballer

Personal information
- Full name: Alan Arthur Aronggear
- Date of birth: 10 May 1990 (age 36)
- Place of birth: Merauke, Indonesia
- Height: 1.79 m (5 ft 10 1/2 in)
- Position: Striker

Youth career
- 2007–2009: Persipura Jayapura

Senior career*
Years	Team	Apps	(Gls)
2009–2011	Persiwa Wamena	17	(0)
2011–2013	Persidafon Dafonsoro	13	(7)
2014–2017	Perseru Serui	72	(11)
2018–2019	Perserang Serang	17	(1)

International career
2009–	Indonesia U-23		
- * Club domestic league appearances and goals as of 13 April 2014

Alan Arthur Aronggear or Alan Aronggear (born 10 May 1990 in Merauke, Merauke Regency, Papua) is an Indonesian footballer.
