= Persib Bandung U-21 =

Indonesian football club

Persib Bandung U-20
- Full name: Persatuan Sepak Bola Indonesia Bandung; U-20
- Nickname: Maung Ngora (The Young Tigers)
- Ground: Si Jalak Harupat Stadium
- Coach: Budiman
- League: EPA U-20
- 2019: 4th (group stage)
Home colours	Away colours	Third colours

Persib Bandung U-20 is an Indonesian football team located in Bandung, West Java, Indonesia. They are the reserve team of Persib Bandung. Their most common nickname is Maung Ngora (The Young Tigers).

== History ==
They won the 2009–10 Indonesia Super League U-21 after beating Pelita Bandung Raya U-21 2–0 in the final. Munadi also got the best player award that season.

== Notable former players ==
- (Indonesia) Atep
- (Indonesia) Dedi Kusnandar
- (Indonesia) Febri Haryadi
- (Indonesia) Gian Zola
- (Indonesia) Henhen Herdiana
- (Indonesia) Ferdinand Sinaga
- (Indonesia) Jajang Mulyana
- (Indonesia) Jajang Sukmara
- (Indonesia) Dias Angga Putra
- (Indonesia) Hanif Sjahbandi
- (Indonesia) Ryuji Utomo
- (Indonesia) Sutanto Tan
- (Indonesia) I Nyoman Adi Parwa
- (Indonesia) Abdul Aziz
- (Indonesia) Muhammad Natshir
- (Indonesia) Andritany Ardhiyasa
- (Indonesia) Yudi Khoerudin
- (Indonesia) Johan Juansyah
- (Indonesia) Eka Ramdani
- (Indonesia) Yandi Sofyan
- (Indonesia) Zaenal Arief
- (Indonesia) Munadi
- (Indonesia) Rendi Saputra
- (Indonesia) Muhammad Agung Pribadi
- (Indonesia) Budiawan
- (Indonesia) Rudiyana
- (Indonesia) Wildansyah
- (Indonesia) Sigit Hermawan

== Honours ==
- Indonesia Super League U-21
  - Winners (1): 2009–10
