= Semen Padang F.C. U-21 =

Indonesian football club

Semen Padang FC U-20
- Full name: Semen Padang Football Club U-20
- Nickname(s): Kabau Sirah Mudo
- Ground: Gelora Haji Agus Salim Stadium
- Manager: Delviadri
- League: EPA U-20
- 2019: 5th (group stage)
Home colours	Away colours

Semen Padang FC U-20 is an Indonesian football team located in Padang, Indonesia. They are the reserve team of Semen Padang.

== History ==
They became the runner-up in the 2011 Indonesia Super League U-21. On 19 October 2014, Semen Padang U-21 won the 2014 Indonesia Super League U-21 after defeating Sriwijaya U-21 4–0 in the final.

== Honours ==
- Indonesia Super League U-21
  - Winners (1): 2014
  - Runners-up (1): 2011
