= Persiwa Wamena U-21 =

Indonesian football club

Persiwa Wamena U-20
- Full name: Persatuan Sepakbola Indonesia Wamena U-20
- Nickname: The Young's Highlanders
- Ground: Pendidikan Stadium
- Manager: John R. Banua
| Home colours | Away colours |

Persiwa Wamena U-20 is an Indonesian football club based in Wamena, Indonesia.
